= Overseas departments and regions of France =

Parts of France located outside Metropolitan France

The overseas departments and regions of France (French: départements et régions d'outre-mer, pronounced [depaʁtəmɑ̃ e ʁeʒjɔ̃ dutʁəmɛʁ]; DROM) are the five departments and regions of the French Republic which are located outside European France (also known as "Metropolitan France"). These overseas entities have exactly the same status as European France's departments and regions. The Constitution of France provides that, in general, French laws and regulations (France's civil code, penal code, administrative law, social laws, and tax laws) apply to French overseas departments and regions the same way as in metropolitan France, but can be adapted as needed to suit the region's particular needs. Hence, the local administrations of French overseas departments and regions cannot themselves pass new laws. On occasion, referendums are undertaken to re-assess the sentiment in local status.

Since March 2011, the five overseas departments and regions of France are:

- French Guiana in South America, a part of The Guianas;
- Guadeloupe in the Caribbean Sea, a part of the Leeward Islands of the Lesser Antilles;
- Martinique in the Caribbean Sea, a part of the Windward Islands of the Lesser Antilles;
- Mayotte in the Mozambique Channel, a part of the Comoro Islands;
- Réunion in the Indian Ocean, a part of the Mascarene Islands.

French Guiana, Martinique, and Mayotte are single territorial collectivities, and so (along with Corsica) have a single government that operates as both a region and a department. Guadeloupe and Réunion have separate regional and departmental governments that cover the same territory.

Other parts of Overseas France have more autonomy, namely the overseas collectivities and New Caledonia.

== History ==
France's earliest, short-lived attempt at setting up overseas departments was after Napoleon's conquest of the Republic of Venice in 1797, when the hitherto Venetian Ionian Islands fell to the French Directory and were organised as the departments of Mer-Égée, Ithaque and Corcyre. In 1798, the Russian Admiral Fyodor Ushakov evicted the French from these islands, and though France regained them via the Treaty of Tilsit in 1807, the three departments were not revived.

Under the 1946 constitution of the Fourth Republic, the French colonies of Guadeloupe and Martinique in the Caribbean; French Guiana in South America; and Réunion in the Indian Ocean were defined as overseas departments, joining Algeria in North Africa, which had previously been divided into three departments and a territory in 1848. (Note: With the departmentalization of French Algeria during the Second French Republic, the departments of Algiers, Oran, and Constantine were established in the north of the country while the Saharan portion was administered as the Southern Territories.)

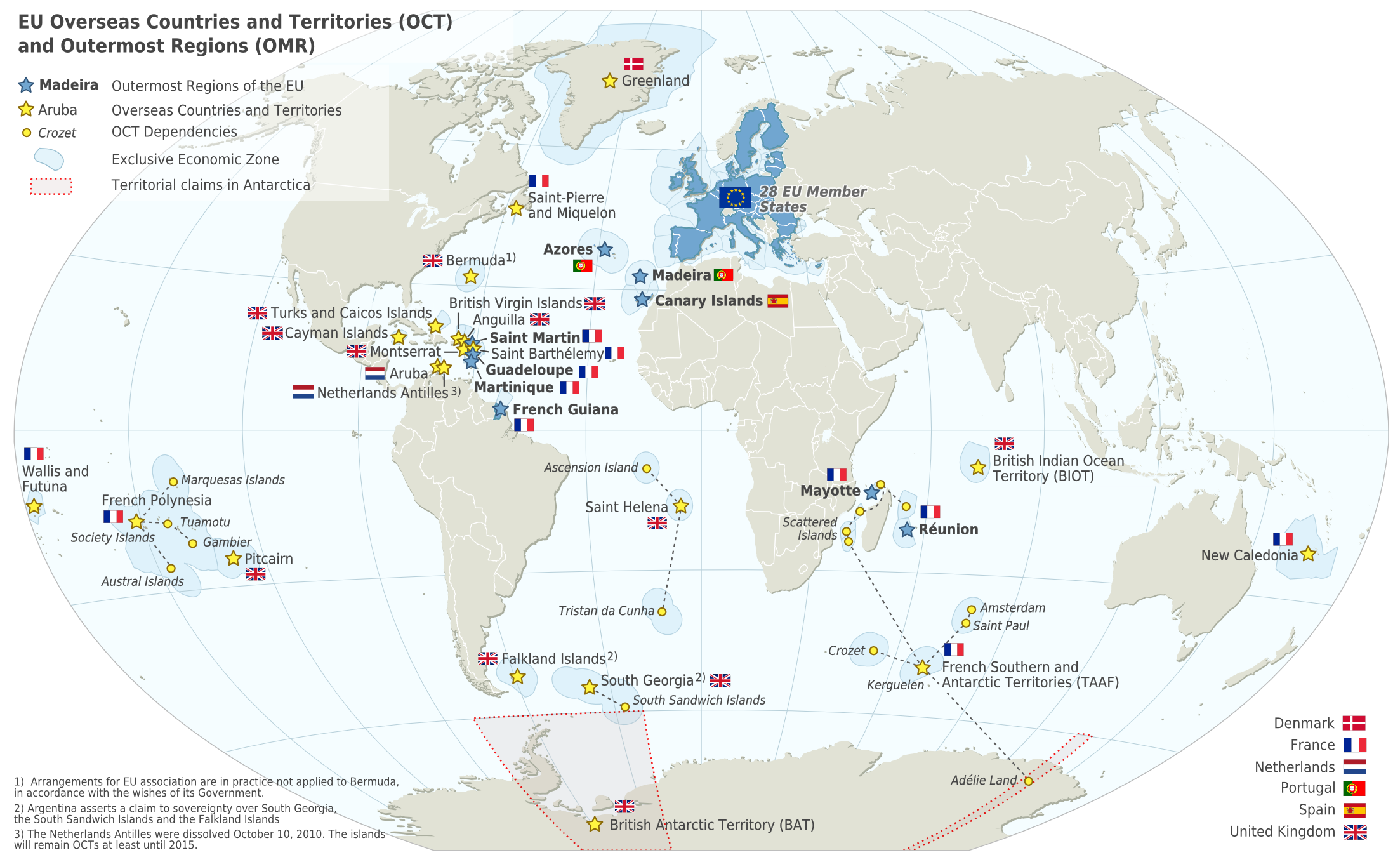
2013–2020 map of the European Union in the world with overseas countries and territories and outermost regions

Since 1982, following the French government's policy of decentralization, overseas departments have elected regional councils with powers similar to those of the regions of metropolitan France. As a result of a constitutional revision that occurred in 2003, these regions are now to be called "overseas regions"; indeed, the new wording of the Constitution gives no precedence to the terms "overseas department" or "overseas region", though the latter is still virtually unused by the French media.

The overseas collectivity of Saint Pierre and Miquelon was an overseas department from 1976 to 1985. All five of France's overseas departments have between 200,000 and 1,000,000 people each, whereas Saint Pierre and Miquelon has only about 6,000, and the smaller collectivity unit therefore seemed more appropriate for the islands.

The overseas collectivity of Mayotte held a referendum on 29 March 2009. Of the votes, 95% were for becoming an overseas department. Mayotte became an overseas department on 31 March 2011.

== Geography and characteristics ==
Each overseas department is the sole department in its own overseas region (French: région d'outre-mer) with powers identical to the regions of metropolitan France. Because of the one-to-one correspondence, informal usage does not distinguish the two, and the French media use the term département d'outre-mer (DOM) almost exclusively.

As integral parts of France and the European Union, overseas departments are represented in the National Assembly, Senate, and Economic and Social Council. The areas also vote to elect members of the European Parliament (MEP), and also use the euro as their currency. The overseas departments and regions are not the same as the overseas collectivities, which have a semi-autonomous status.

Guadeloupe and Réunion each have separate departmental and regional councils, while in Mayotte, Guiana and Martinique, the two layers of government are consolidated so one body wields both sets of powers. The overseas departments acquired these additional powers in 1982, when France's decentralisation policy dictated that they be given elected regional councils and other regional powers; however, the term "overseas region" was only introduced with the French constitutional amendment of 28 March 2003.

Due to distance from the EU and local proximity, some areas participate in economic fora and organizations of mutual interest geographically close-by, such as Martinique and Guadeloupe, which each take part in both the Organisation of Eastern Caribbean States (OECS) and Association of Caribbean States (ACS); or French Polynesia, which takes part in the Pacific Islands Forum (PIF).

== Demographics ==
Historical populations of current overseas departments and regions
Year	Pop.	±%
1950	720,000	—
1960	949,000	+31.8%
1970	1,194,000	+25.8%
1980	1,286,000	+7.7%
1990	1,566,000	+21.8%
2000	1,865,000	+19.1%
2010	2,148,000	+15.2%
2020	2,165,749	+0.8%

== See also ==
- List of islands of France
- Administrative divisions of France
- Outre-mer
- Overseas France
- Overseas Territories of France (European Parliament constituency)
- Overseas territory
- Special member state territories and the European Union
