= French rule in the Ionian Islands =

The Ionian Islands were twice under French rule:

- French rule in the Ionian Islands (1797–1799), under the First French Republic
- French rule in the Ionian Islands (1807–1814), under the First French Empire
