= François-Xavier Donzelot =

French general and imperial governor (1764–1843)

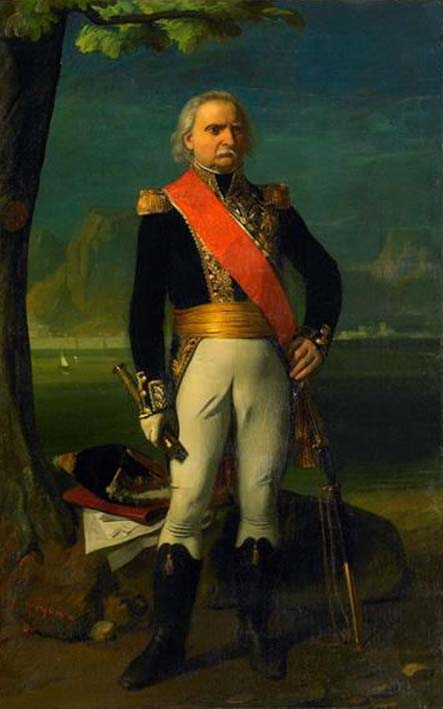
Portrait of General François-Xavier Donzelot by Jean Gigoux

Comte François-Xavier Donzelot (English: /dɒnzəˈloʊ/ don-zə-LOH, French: [fʁɑ̃swa ksavje dɔ̃zəlo]; 7 January 1764, in Mamirolle – 11 June 1843) was a French general and a Governor of the Ionian Islands and Martinique. He was the son of François Donzelot and Jeanne–Baptiste Maire and had a brother named Joseph. He was also the grandson of Anathole de Montfaucon, a famous historical family in France. He became a general of the French army in March 1801. Months later, he signed the surrender of Egypt to British forces. He then returned to France where he served in various high-echelon positions in Napoleon's army. Subsequently, he was appointed to serve as the head of the French garrison in Corfu and the Ionian Islands from 1807 to 1814. As governor, he resided in Corfu, where his gentle demeanour and mild manners made him popular with the Corfiotes. In 1808, he was named Baron of the Empire. In 1815, he was a divisional commander of the 2nd infantry division of the 1st army corps of Napoleon's forces at the Battle of Waterloo, during the 100-day return of Napoleon from the island of Elba. After the irremediable defeat, he retreated in order, keeping his flags, to the Loire river and commands the Army of the Loire which cannot protect Paris from the invasion of the Russian and Prussian coalition. He is placed in non-activity at the return of the King but quickly returns to grace since Louis XVIII, by his Minister of War, Clarke Duke of Feltre nicknamed the Marshal of Ink given the time he spent in the offices, appointed him Inspector General of the Infantry on August 18, 1816. In 1817, he was appointed governor of Martinique. He was made Count on 22 August 1819.

== Early career and French Revolutionary wars ==
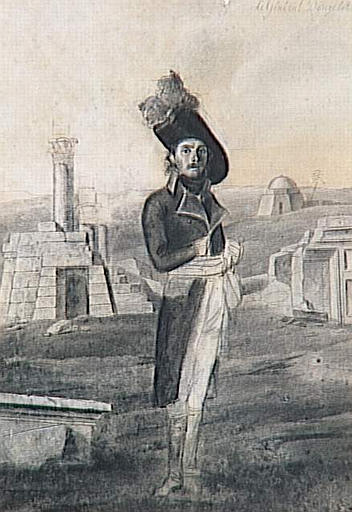
General François-Xavier Donzelot by André Dutertre

François-Xavier Donzelot entered the French army in 1785 as a private in the Régiment Royal-La Marine. In 1792 he was promoted to 2nd lieutenant in the 12th Regiment of Cavalry. In 1793 he became a lieutenant in the 22nd Regiment of Chasseurs. The same year he was promoted to adjudant-general in command of a battalion and in 1794 of a brigade. During the French Revolutionary Wars Donzelot served in the campaigns of the Army of the Rhine under the command of Pichegru and Moreau.

In 1798 Donzelot served in the French campaign in Egypt and Syria, distinguishing himself at Cairo and in the Battle of Heliopolis. In 1799 he was made a temporary general de brigade, the rank being made permanent in 1801. After his return to France, he served on the staff of the minister of war, Louis-Alexandre Berthier. From 1804 to 1805 he served in the Army of Italy. In 1806-1807 he served under André Masséna and in the Siege of Gaeta. On 6 December 1807 Donzelot was promoted to general de division.

== British blockade of Corfu ==
In 1807, French general César Berthier with 17,000 men landed in Corfu and took over control of the Russian-backed Septinsular Republic, according to the Treaty of Tilsit.

Soon after, Berthier was replaced by General Donzelot.

By order of the French Emperor Napoleon, Donzelot was entrusted with overseeing the reinforcement of the many fortifications of Corfu in anticipation of the British blockade. The French garrison in Corfu consisted of approximately 20,000 men, who were put under the leadership of General Donzelot, who was acknowledged as an intelligent, charming and capable leader.

Captain Richard Hussey Moubray (1776-1842), a British naval officer in command of HMS Active, after the refitting of his ship, was ordered to participate in the blockade of Corfu. During the blockade, the British captain captured several French ships, one of which carried the personal library of General Donzelot. Donzelot himself fled the scene in another boat.

The British captain seized the opportunity of the capture of Donzelot's library and used it as a diplomatic tool and a gesture of goodwill aimed at improving the relations between the two men by returning it to Donzelot, as well as other property which happened to be seized from the French. The gesture of the British officer had the intended effect on Donzelot who not only acknowledged his appreciation of Captain Moubray's gesture in writing but he also treated any captured British officer from then on as a guest, by reserving for him a seat at his table.

After the fall of Napoleon, Donzelot did not surrender, hoping that the French would be able to continue reinforcing their fortifications and use Corfu as a waypoint to Malta. Only after Louis XVIII ordered Donzelot to leave from Corfu in 1814 did the French finally surrender conditionally to the British and with this surrender the blockade of Corfu by the British came to an end. After the departure of the French forces from Corfu, the British under Sir James Campbell's command seized control of the Ionian islands.

== Greek struggle for independence ==
In 1809, Theodoros Kolokotronis approached Donzelot, then governor of the Ionian Islands, and told him that he was planning to ask Napoleon for help with his plans to unseat Ali Pasha and his son Veli Pasha. Donzelot offered to mediate with Napoleon and to provide Kolokotronis with military and financial assistance. He was able to deliver on his promises and his assistance enabled Kolokotronis to recruit 3,000 men to fight against Ali Pasha. The plans, however, did not pan out the way Donzelot envisioned because the British came into the scene and Kolokotronis formed an alliance with them.

== Waterloo ==
During the Hundred Days, Donzelot was the commander of the 2nd Infantry Division in the Army of the North, returning to active duty for Waterloo after a 16-year hiatus that saw him in the administrative role of Governor of the Ionian Islands while his colleagues were fighting in campaigns all over Europe. Before Waterloo, his last battle engagement was sixteen years prior in his participation in the Battle of the Pyramids as a commander of about 1000 men. Before his engagement at Waterloo, his other experience included being chief-of-staff for generals Desaix, Augereau, and Masséna. Consequently, his military skills were definitely outdated by the time he went to Waterloo. At the start of the engagement at Waterloo, his division suffered heavy losses when they were frontally attacked by the British I Corps and decisively defeated by British heavy cavalry. At 16:00 hours, Donzelot managed to regroup and, subsequently with the aid of the 1st Division, managed to take La Haye Sainte, although his victory did not last.

== Martinique ==
After the Waterloo campaign, Donzelot's next appointment to a government position was as Governor of Martinique from 1818 to 1826. In 1819, he was named Comte.

As governor of Martinique, Donzelot attempted to implement a military colonisation programme to increase the white population of the French West Indies by bringing poor white workers and farmers from France. His plan, however, was met with resistance from the local Creole elite who feared that the underprivileged immigrant workers would intermix with the free local population of mixed race people and was never implemented.

During his tenure as governor of Martinique, Donzelot was also involved in an incident which gave rise to British concerns over French policy in the Caribbean. At the time, the French fleet unexpectedly started receiving reinforcements without providing any explanation to the British. Around the same time, Donzelot provided naval support for Spanish troops being deployed to Cuba. Because of these two events, the British became alarmed and proceeded to make quiet diplomatic enquiries to the French. George Canning, however, bypassed diplomatic niceties and demanded answers directly from the French government in Paris. From the French side, François-Étienne de Damas was very apologetic and reassured the British side that Donzelot acted on his own initiative. On the other hand, another French respondent by the name of Jean-Baptiste de Villèle admitted that Donzelot acted, on orders from Paris, to help Spain maintain control of Cuba. Upon hearing this, Canning immediately demanded from Villèle an unreserved denunciation of the Paris directives, which he managed to obtain. The French actions caused the British to fear that the French, by helping Spain in Cuba, would gradually become deeply involved in the affairs of the island and exert influence there.

On 3 February 1819, a ministerial dispatch instructed the Governor Administrator to examine the question of introducing the use of steamships in the western colonies. On 21 January 1820, he approved the creation of a steamship company in Martinique. On 20 July, a voluntary subscription was launched. On 2 August 1820, he signed a contract for the construction of a steamboat, the hull of which was built in Bordeaux and the twenty-horsepower "fire engine" in Chaillot. After many ups and downs and great financial expenses, the ship crossed the Atlantic (but under sail, thus missing the opportunity to be one of the first steam ships to cross the Atlantic by this means) and was officially commissioned on 1 March 1823 for communications between the cities of Saint-Pierre and Fort-Royal under the name of "Comte Donzelot". In December 1823, the Martinique advisory committee expressed its wish to stop the activity of this ship because of chronic operating losses (annales de Martinique).

== Retirement and death ==
After In 1826, Donzelot was replaced and he retired to Mamirolle (Near Besançon, France) and above all to his château de Ville-Evrard in Neuilly-sur-Marne (near Paris, France), where he spent his retirement as a patron of the arts, surrounded by artists and writers (he was to serve as a model for Alfred de Vigny's Servitude and Military Grandeur). He was placed on military leave, with the Grand Cross of Saint Louis, of which he was decorated in December 1825. He was then 62 years old; the government of Louis-Philippe took him out of the reserve in February 1831 (to receive and train troops for the security of Paris) and put him back in permanently by the order of 5 April 1832 on 1 May of that year. He was a major donor to his childhood church, to the Besançon Museum of Fine Arts and to the commune of Neuilly-sur-Marne, where his château de Ville-Évrard was located; it was there that he died on 21 June 1843. His tomb, a proud mastaba decorated with the disc and winged serpents of Edfu, stands in the town cemetery. His name is inscribed on the eastern side of the Arc de Triomphe de l'Étoile. The redoubt of Montfaucon, belonging to the fortified place of Besançon, bears his name. The same had previously been done for one of the three forts built to defend Boulaq in Egypt.

His name is inscribed under the Arc de Triomphe.

== Sources ==
- Adkin, Mark (2001). The Waterloo Companion: The Complete Guide to History's Most Famous Land Battle. Mechanicsburg, Pennsylvania: Stackpole Books. ISBN 0-8117-1854-9.
- Le Bas, Philippe; Lemaitre, Augustin François (1842). France: Dictionnaire encyclopédique. Firmin Didot frères. pp. 615–616.
- Besson, Nicolas François Louis (1902). Annales Franc–Comtoises (in French). Vol. 14. Besançon, France: Imprimerie de Paul Jacquin.
- Brown, Anthony Gary; White, Colin (2006) [1999]. The Patrick O'Brian Muster Book: Persons, Animals, Ships and Cannon in the Aubrey-Maturin Sea Novels. Jefferson, North Carolina: McFarland & Company, Incorporated. ISBN 0-7864-2482-6. "Francois Xavier Donzelot (1764-1843) rose from the ranks to become a staff officer of distinction, being promoted General in March 1801. Just a few months later he was the unwilling signatory of the surrender of Egypt to the British forces."
- Dakin, Douglas (1973). The Greek Struggle for Independence, 1821-1833. Berkeley and Los Angeles, California: University of California Press. ISBN 0-520-02342-0.
- de Préau, Charles–Théodore Beauvais; Voïart, Jacques Philippe (1821). "Biographie Militaire Française. Tables du Temple de la Gloire". Victoires, Conquêtes, Désastres, Revers et Guerres Civiles des Français, de 1795 a 1815 (in French). Paris, France: C. L. F. Panckoucke.
- Dicks, Brian (1977). Corfu. London, United Kingdom: David and Charles. ISBN 9780715373118.
- Elting, John R. (1997). Swords Around A Throne: Napoleon's Grand Armée. Cambridge, Massachusetts: Da Capo Press (Perseus Books Group). ISBN 0-306-80757-2.
- Kaufmann, William W. (1951). British Policy and the Independence of Latin America, 1804-1828. Vol. 52. New Haven, Connecticut: Yale University Press.
- Littell, Eliakim; Littell, Robert S. (1889). The Living Age. Vol. CLXXXI. Boston, Massachusetts: Littell and Company.
- Martin, Robert Montgomery (1835). History of the British Colonies, Volume 5: Possessions in Europe. London, United Kingdom: James Cochrane and Company.
- Pépé, Guglielmo (1846). Memoirs of General Pépé: Comprising the Principal Military and Political Events of Modern Italy, Volume 1. London, United Kingdom: Richard Bentley.
- Ralfe, James (1828). The Naval Biography of Great Britain: Consisting of Historical Memoirs of those Officers of the British Navy who Distinguished Themselves during the Reign of His Majesty George III. London, United Kingdom: Whitmore & Fenn, Charing-Cross.
- Rivollet, Georges (1969). L'Arc de Triomphe et les Oubliés de la Gloire (in French). Paris, France: J. Peyronnet et Cie.
- Schloss, Rebecca Hartkopf (2009). Sweet Liberty: The Final Days of Slavery in Martinique. Philadelphia, Pennsylvania: University of Pennsylvania Press. ISBN 978-0-8122-4172-3. Archived from the original on 2012-06-03.
- Thierry, Jules D.; Coulon, Gustave (1840). Notice Historique sur l'Arc de Triomphe de l'Étoile. Paris, France: J. Thierry, Rue Sainte-Appoline.
