= Corcyre =

French department (1797–1802)

Department of Corcyre Département de Corcyre
- 1797–1799
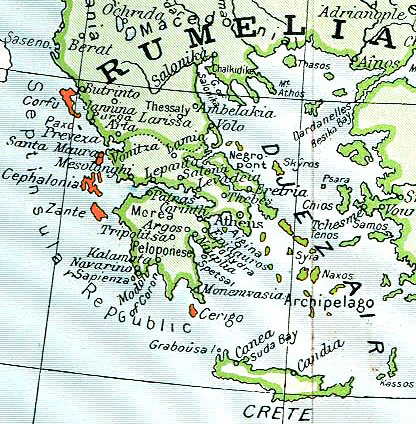
- The three departments of Greece
- Status: Department of the French First Republic
- Chef-lieu: Corfu; 39.70°N 19.79°E
- Common languages: Greek
- Other languages: French (administrative)

Government
  - Commissioners: Louis Chicoilet de Corbigny; Jean Briche
- Historical era: French Revolutionary Wars
  - Treaty of Campo Formio: 17 October 1797
  - Establishment: 7 November 1797
  - Fall of Butrint: 25 October 1798
  - Fall of Corfu: 3 March 1799
  - Official disbandment: 25 March 1802
Preceded by	Succeeded by
Venetian rule in the Ionian Islands	Septinsular Republic; Pashalik of Yanina
- Today part of: Albania; Greece

Corcyre (French: [kɔʁ.kiʁ]; archaic French for "Corfu"; Greek: Κέρκυρα, romanized: Kerkyra) was one of three short-lived French departments of Greece.

== History ==
It came into existence after Napoleon's conquest in 1797 of the Republic of Venice, when Venetian Greek possessions such as the Ionian Islands fell to the French Directory. It consisted of the islands of Kerkyra (Corfu) and Paxoi, as well as the cities of Butrint and Parga on the adjacent mainland. Its prefecture was in the City of Corfu. The island was lost to Russia after the Siege of Corfu (1798–1799) and the department was officially disbanded in 1802. Also, Butrint was captured in 1798 by Ali Pasha, ruler of the Pashalik of Yanina.

During the renewed French control in 1807–1814, the department was not re-established, the constitutional form of the former Septinsular Republic being kept.

== Administration ==
=== Commissioners ===
The Commissioner of the Directory was the highest state representative in the department.

Term start	Term end	Office holder
18 October 1797	?? May 1798	Louis Antoine Ange Chicoilet de Corbigny
?? May 1798	3 March 1799	Jean Briche

== See also ==
- Department of Mer-Égée
- Department of Ithaque
- French rule in the Ionian Islands (1797–1799)
- Treaty of Campo Formio
