= Mer-Égée =

French department in the Ionian Islands (1797-1802); today part of Greece

Department of Mer-Égée Département de Mer-Égée (French)
- 1797–1798
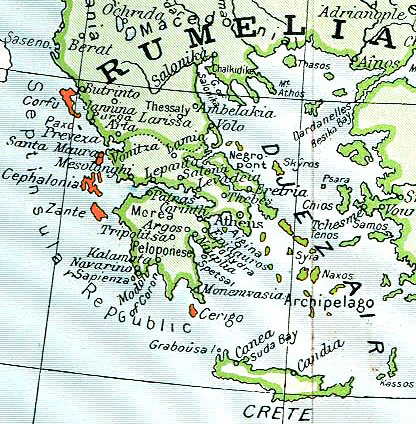
- The three departments of Greece
- Status: Department of the French First Republic
- Chef-lieu: Zakynthos; 37.78°N 20.89°E
- Common languages: Greek
- Administrative languages: French

Government
  - Commissioner: Chriseuil de Rulhière
- Historical era: French Revolutionary Wars
  - Treaty of Campo Formio: 17 October 1797
  - Establishment: 7 November 1797
  - Fall of Zakynthos: 25 October 1798
  - Official disbandment: 25 March 1802
Preceded by	Succeeded by
Venetian rule in the Ionian Islands	Septinsular Republic; Pashalik of Yanina
- Today part of: Greece

Mer-Égée (French: [mɛʁ eʒe]; French for "Aegean Sea") was one of three short-lived French departments of Greece. It came into existence after Napoleon's conquest in 1797 of the Republic of Venice, when Venetian Greek possessions such as the Ionian Islands fell to the French Directory.

== History ==
The department included the islands of Zante (Zakynthos), Kythira and the Strofades, as well as Dragamesto (modern Astakos) on the Greek mainland. Despite its name, the department was mostly not in the Aegean, but the Ionian Sea, apart from Kythira and its dependencies.

Its prefecture was at the town of Zante (Zakynthos). The territories were lost to Russia in 1798 except Dragamesto that was captured by Ali Pasha, ruler of the Pashalik of Yanina, and the department was officially disbanded in 1802.

During the renewed French control of the area in 1807–1809, the department was not re-established, the constitutional form of the Septinsular Republic being kept.

== Administration ==
=== Commissioner ===
The Commissioner of the Directory was the highest state representative in the department.

Term start	Term end	Office holder
18 October 1797	3 March 1799	Chriseuil Omer François de Rulhière

== See also ==
- Department of Corcyre
- Department of Ithaque
- French rule in the Ionian Islands (1797–1799)
- Treaty of Campo Formio
- History of Zakynthos
