= Ithaque =

French department in the Ionian Islands (1797-1802); today part of Greece

Department of Ithaque Département d'Ithaque
- 1797–1798
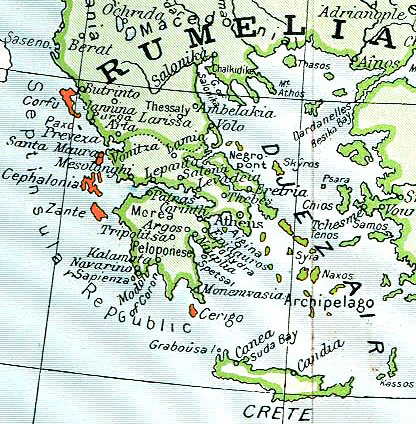
- The three departments of Greece
- Status: Department of the French First Republic
- Chef-lieu: Argostoli; 38.17°N 20.49°E
- Common languages: Greek
- Other languages: French (administrative)

Government
  - Commissioner: Pierre-Pomponne-Amédée Pocholle
- Historical era: French Revolutionary Wars
  - Treaty of Campo Formio: 17 October 1797
  - Establishment: 7 November 1797
  - Fall of Cephalonia: 29 October 1798
  - Official disbandment: 25 March 1802
Preceded by	Succeeded by
Venetian rule in the Ionian Islands	Septinsular Republic; Pashalik of Yanina
- Today part of: Greece

Ithaque (French: [i.tak]; French for "Ithaca") was one of three short-lived French departments of Greece.

== History ==
It came into existence after Napoleon's conquest in 1797 of the Republic of Venice, when Venetian Greek possessions such as the Ionian Islands fell to the French Directory. It included the islands of Ithaca, Cephalonia and Lefkada, as well as the cities of Preveza, Arta and Vonitsa on the adjacent mainland. Its prefecture was at Argostoli on Cephalonia. The islands were lost to Russia in 1798 and the department was officially disbanded in 1802. Also Preveza, Arta and Vonitsa were captured in 1798 by Ali Pasha, ruler of the Pashalik of Yanina.

During the renewed French control of the area in 1807–1809, the department was not re-established, the constitutional form of the Septinsular Republic being kept.

== Administration ==
=== Commissioner ===
The Commissioner of the Directory was the highest state representative in the department.

Term start	Term end	Office holder
18 October 1797	3 March 1799	Pierre-Pomponne-Amédée Pocholle

== See also ==
- Department of Mer-Égée
- Department of Corcyre
- French rule in the Ionian Islands (1797–1799)
- Treaty of Campo Formio
