= Ionian Islands =

Group of islands in Greece

Ionian Islands Ιόνιοι Νήσοι Iónioi Nísoi
- Geographic region of Greece
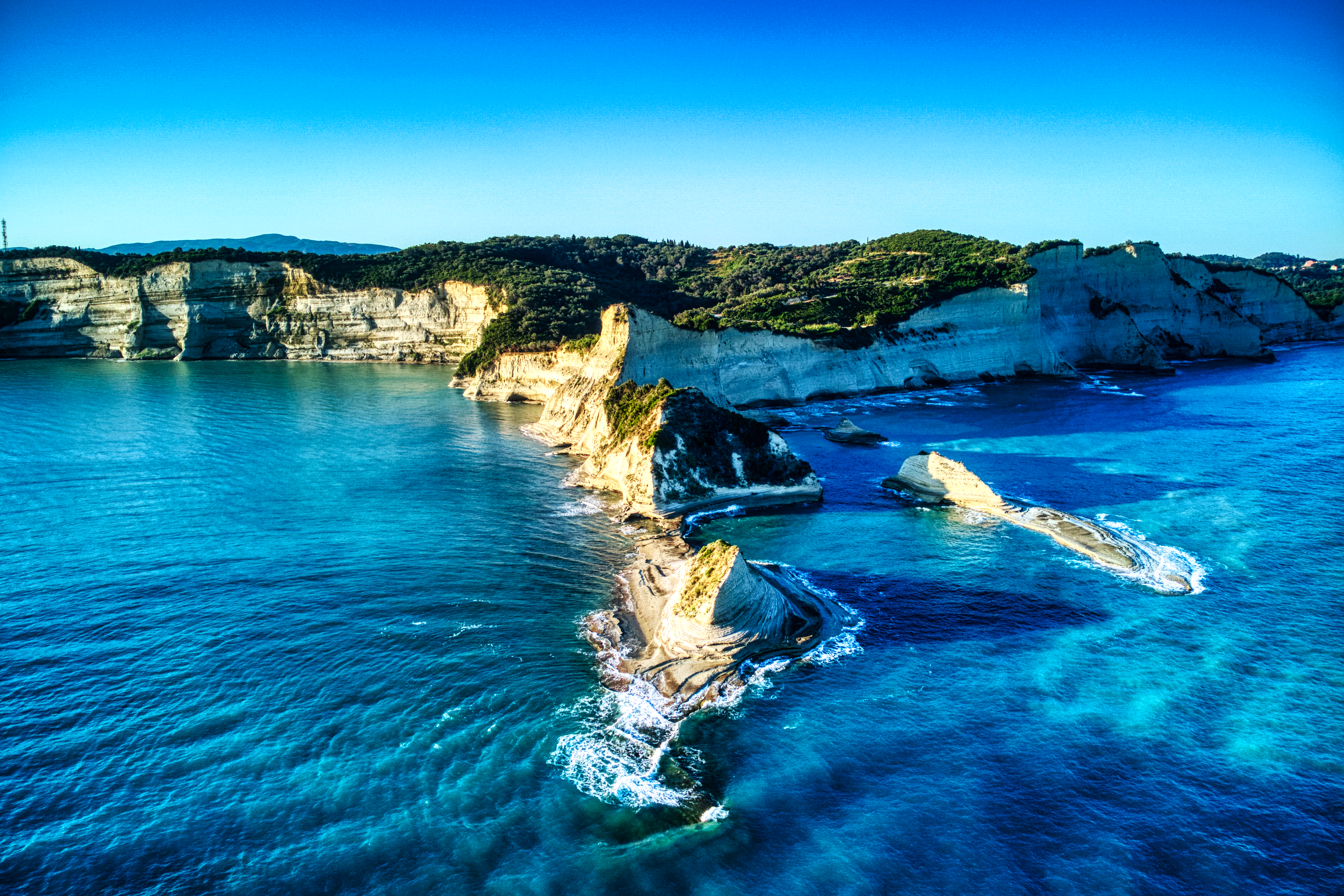
- Cape Drastis (Corfu)

- Coordinates: 37°48′N 20°42′E
- Country: Greece
- Cession: 1864
- Capital: Corfu
- Islands: List: Corfu; Ithaca; Kefalonia; Kythira; Lefkada; Paxi; Zakynthos

Area
  - Total: 2,306.94 km^{2} (890.71 sq mi)

Population (2011)
  - Total: 207,855
  - Density: 90.0999/km^{2} (233.358/sq mi)
- Demonym(s): Heptanesian, Septinsular
- Time zone: UTC+2 (EET)
  - Summer (DST): UTC+3 (EEST)
- ISO 3166 code: GR-F
- Website: www.pin.gov.gr

The Ionian Islands (Modern Greek: Ιόνια νησιά, Ionia nisia; Ancient Greek, Katharevousa: Ἰόνιαι Νῆσοι, Ioniai Nēsoi) are a group of islands in the Ionian Sea, west of mainland Greece. They are traditionally called the Heptanese ("Seven Islands"; Ἑπτάνησα, Heptanēsa or Ἑπτάνησος, Heptanēsos; Italian: Eptaneso), but the group includes many smaller islands in addition to the seven principal ones.

As a distinct historic region, the collective of islands dates to the centuries-long Venetian rule, which kept them outside Ottoman control, and created a distinct cultural identity with many Italian influences. The Ionian Islands became part of the modern Greek state in 1864. Administratively today, they belong to the Ionian Islands Region except for Kythera, which belongs to the Attica Region.

== Geography ==
The seven primary Ionian islands

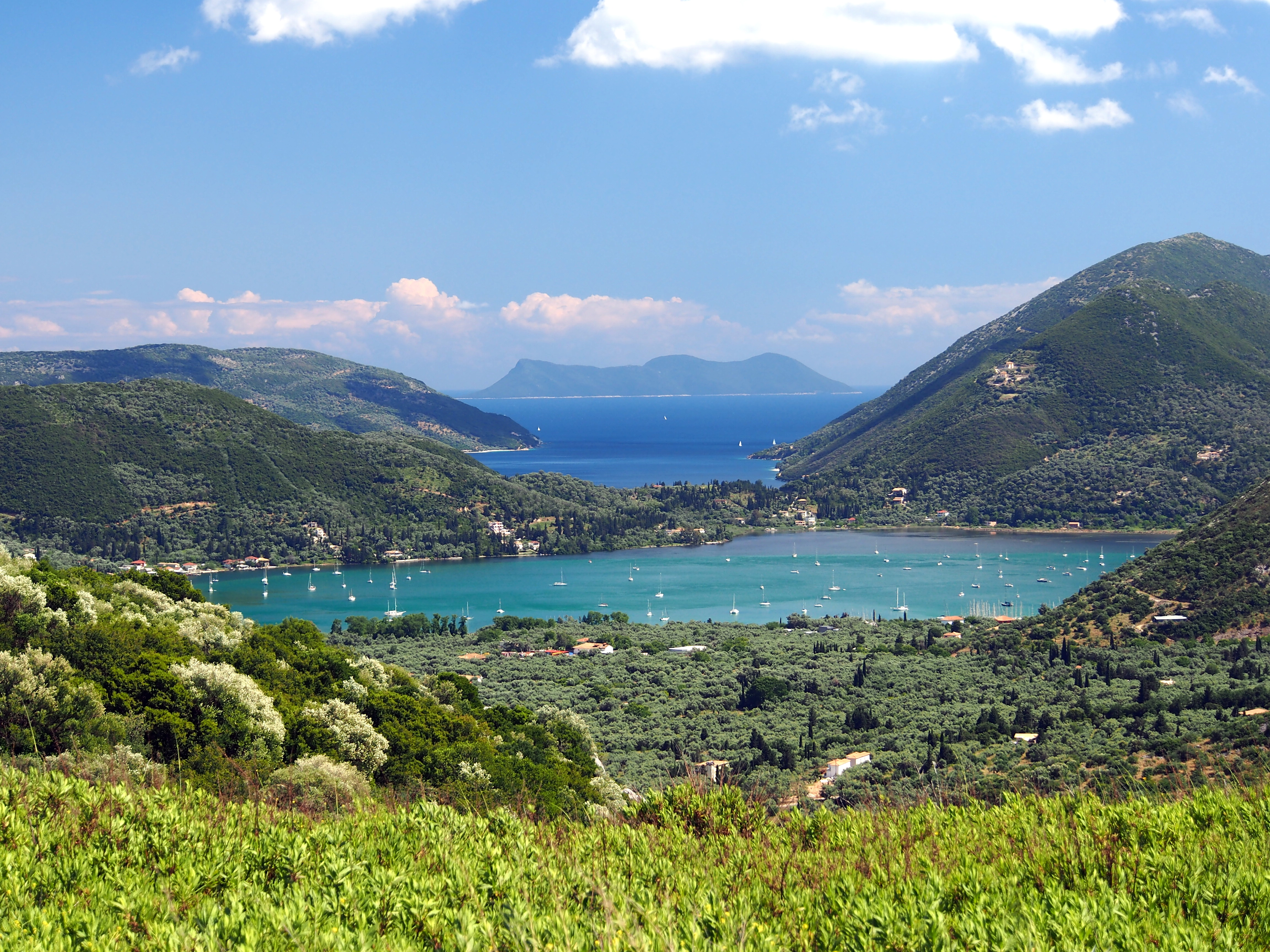
A view of Lefkada.

The seven primary islands are, from north to south:

- Corfu (Κέρκυρα)
- Paxos (Παξοί)
- Lefkada (Λευκάδα), also known as Lefkas in English
- Ithaca (Ιθάκη)
- Kefalonia (Κεφαλονιά), often known as Cefalonia, Cephalonia and Kefallinia in English
- Zante (Ζάκυνθος), sometimes known as Zakynthos in English
- Kythira (Κύθηρα), sometimes known as Cythera in English

The six northern islands are off the west coast of Greece, in the Ionian Sea. The seventh island, Kythira, is off the southern tip of the Peloponnese, the southern part of the Greek mainland. Kythira is not part of the region of the Ionian Islands, as it is included in the region of Attica.

== Etymology ==
In Ancient Greek, the adjective Ionios (Ἰόνιος) was used as an epithet for the sea between Epirus and Italy in which the Ionian Islands are found, because, according to myth, Io swam across it. Although they have the same Latin transliteration and Modern Greek pronunciation, the Ionian Sea and Islands are not related to Ionia, an Anatolian region; in Greek, the Ionian Sea and Ionian Islands are spelled with an omicron (Ιόνια), whereas Ionia has an omega (Ιωνία), reflecting a classical difference in pronunciation. The two words are still distinguished by stress: the western "Ionia" is accented on the antepenult (IPA: [iˈonia]), and the eastern on the penult (IPA: [ioˈnia]).

The islands themselves are known by a variety of names. During the centuries of rule by Venice, they acquired Venetian names, by which some of them are still known in English (and in Italian). Kerkyra was known as Corfù, Ithaki as Val di Compare, Kythera as Cerigo, Lefkada as Santa Maura and Zakynthos as Zante.

A variety of spellings are used for the Greek names of the islands, particularly in historical writing. Kefallonia is often spelled as Cephallenia or Cephalonia, Ithaki as Ithaca, Kerkyra as Corcyra, Kythera as Cythera, Lefkada as Leucas or Leucada and Zakynthos as Zacynthus. Older or variant Greek forms are sometimes also used: Kefallinia for Kefallonia and Paxos or Paxoi for Paxi.

== History ==
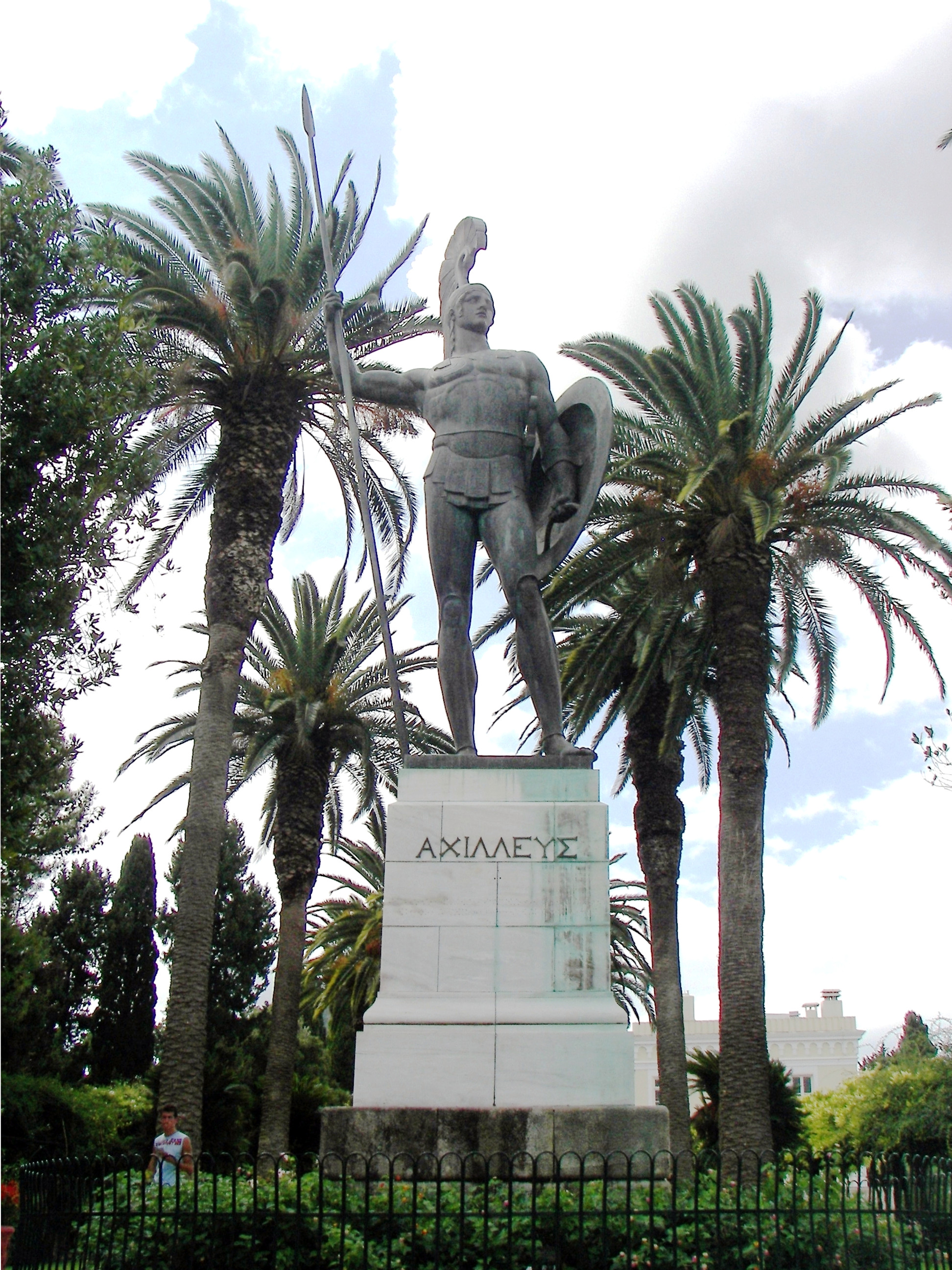
The statue of Achilles in the gardens of the Achilleion (Corfu).

The islands were settled by Greeks at an early date, possibly as early as 1200 BC, and certainly by the 9th century BC. The early Eretrian settlement at Kerkyra was displaced by colonists from Corinth in 734 BC. The islands were mostly a backwater during Ancient Greek times and played little part in Greek politics. The one exception was the conflict between Kerkyra and its mother-city Corinth in 434 BC, which brought intervention from Athens and triggered the Peloponnesian War.

Ithaca was the name of the island home of Odysseus in the epic Ancient Greek poem the Odyssey by Homer. Attempts have been made to identify Ithaki with ancient Ithaca, but the geography of the real island cannot be made to fit Homer's description. Archeological investigations have revealed findings in both Kefalonia and Ithaca.

=== Roman and Byzantine rule ===
By the 4th century BC, most of the islands were absorbed into the empire of Macedon. Some remained under the control of the Macedonian Kingdom until 146 BC, when the Greek peninsula was gradually annexed by Rome. After 400 years of peaceful rule, the islands continued under the control of the Eastern Roman or Byzantine Empire after the fall of the Western Roman Empire.

Under Byzantine rule, from the mid-8th century, they formed the theme of Cephallenia. The islands were a frequent target of Saracen raids and from the late 11th century, saw a number of Norman and Italian attacks. Most of the islands fell to William II of Sicily in 1185. Corfu and Lefkas remained under Byzantine control.

Kefallonia and Zakynthos became the County palatine of Cephalonia and Zakynthos until 1357, when this entity was merged with Lefkada and Ithaki to become the Duchy of Leucadia under French and Italian dukes. Corfu, Paxi and Kythera were taken by the Venetians in 1204, after the dissolution of the Byzantine Empire by the Fourth Crusade. These became important overseas colonies of the Republic and were used as way-stations for their maritime trade with the Levant.

=== Venetian rule ===
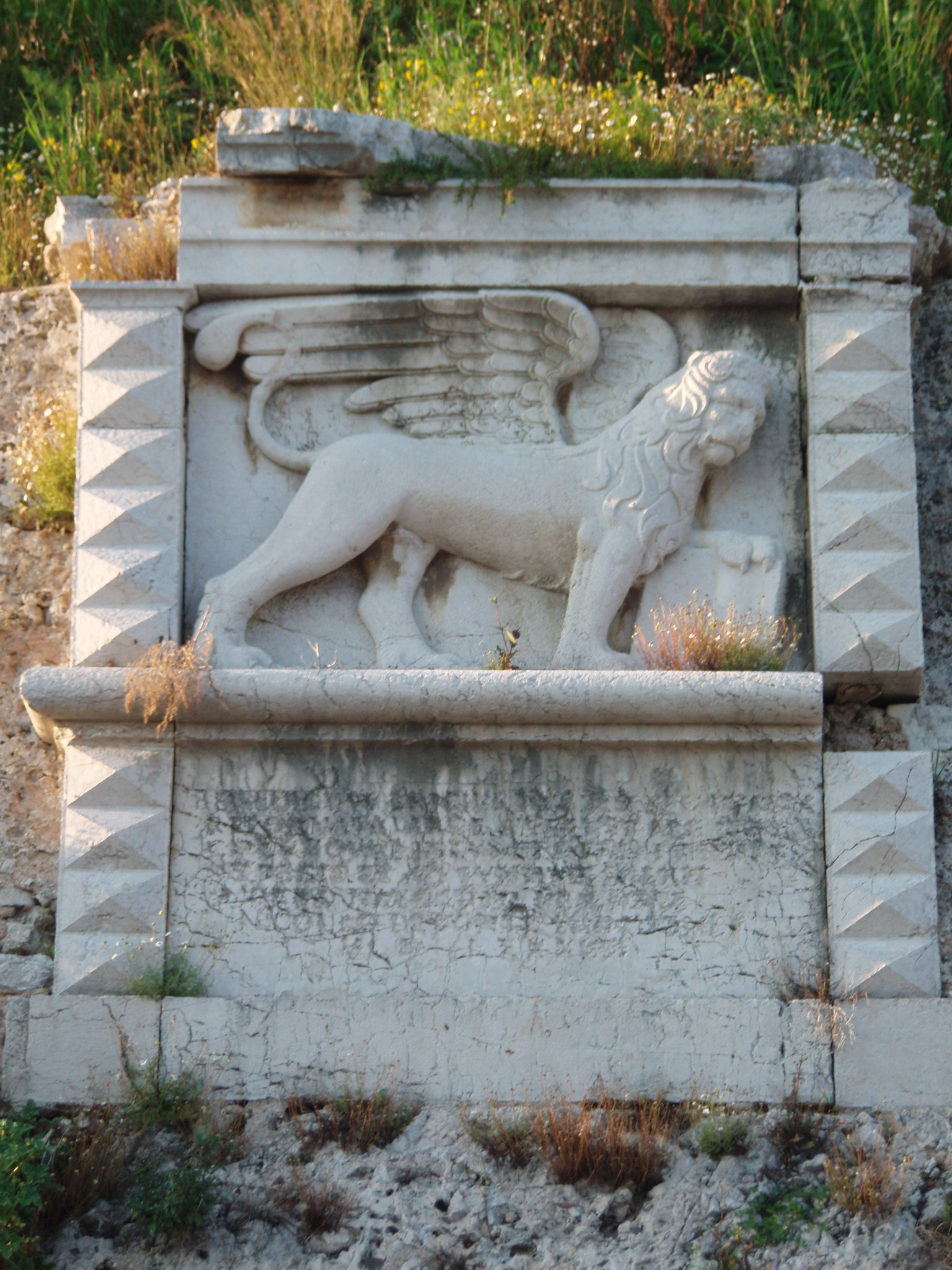
The Lion of St. Mark, symbol of the Venetian Republic, at the New Fortress of Corfu, the longest-held of Venice's overseas possessions.

From 1204, the Republic of Venice controlled Corfu and slowly all the Ionian islands fell under Venetian rule. In the 15th century, the Ottomans conquered most of Greece, but their attempts to conquer the islands were largely unsuccessful. Zakynthos passed permanently to Venice in 1482, Kefalonia and Ithaki in 1483, Lefkada in 1502. Kythera had been in Venetian hands since 1238. The islands became the only part of the Greek-speaking world that did not come under Ottoman rule. During this time, large numbers of Greeks moved to the Ionian islands. Smaller numbers of Albanian, Aromanian and Slavic-speaking Christians also fled to the islands, though they quickly assimilated into the Greek majority.

Venetian was the official language of the islands during this period, and many Greeks adopted the Venetian language for social advancement. This was bolstered by the arrival of thousands of settlers from other parts of the Venetian Republic, forming the basis of the Corfiot Italian community. The majority of the island, however, remained ethnically, linguistically and religiously Greek. Many Corfiot Italians later Hellenised, adopting the Greek language and religion, such as Ioannis Kapodistrias.

In the 18th century, a Greek national independence movement began to emerge, and the free status of the Ionian islands made them the natural base for exiled Greek intellectuals, freedom fighters and foreign sympathisers. The islands became more self-consciously Greek as the 19th century, the century of romantic nationalism, neared.

=== Napoleonic era ===
The flag of the Septinsular Republic (1800–1807), the first self-governed Greek state since the Middle Ages. It is used as an unofficial flag of the region today.

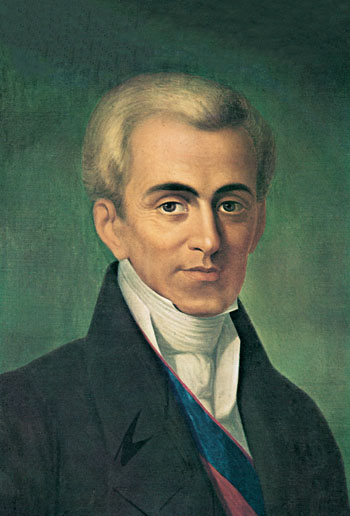
Ioannis Kapodistrias from the Island of Corfu, founder and first Governor (1828–1831) of the modern Greek state.

In 1797, the French general Napoléon Bonaparte conquered Venice. By the Treaty of Campo Formio of October 1797 the islanders found themselves under French rule, which organised the islands as the départements Mer-Égée, Ithaque and Corcyre. In 1798–1799 a Russian-Ottoman fleet under the command of the Russian Admiral Ushakov evicted the French; the victors established the Septinsular Republic of 1800–1807 under joint Russo-Ottoman protection—the first time Greeks had had even limited self-government since the fall of Constantinople in 1453. In 1807 the Treaty of Tilsit between France and Russia ceded the Ionian Islands to the French again, and the French Empire took possession.

=== British rule ===
In 1809, the British Royal Navy defeated the French fleet in Zakynthos (October 2, 1809) captured Kefallonia, Kythera and Zakynthos, and took Lefkada in 1810. The French held out in Corfu until 1814. The Treaty of Paris in 1815 turned the islands into the "United States of the Ionian Islands" under British protection (November 5, 1815). In January 1817, the British granted the islands a new constitution. The islanders elected an Assembly of 40 members, who advised the British High Commissioner. The British greatly improved the islands' communications, and introduced modern education and justice systems. The islanders welcomed most of these reforms, and took up afternoon tea, cricket and other English pastimes. The British also brought thousands of Maltese to the Ionian Islands to work as builders and artisans, forming the basis of the Corfiot Maltese community.

Once Greek independence was established after 1830, however, the islanders began to press for Enosis – union with Greece. The British statesman William Ewart Gladstone toured the islands and recommended that having already Malta, giving the islands to Greece would not hurt the interest of the British Empire. The British government resisted, since like the Venetians they found the islands made useful naval bases. They also regarded the Bavarian-born king of Greece, King Otto, as unfriendly to Britain. However, in 1862, Otto was deposed in a coup by the Great National Assembly and a new king, George I from Denmark, was elected in his place.

=== Union with Greece ===
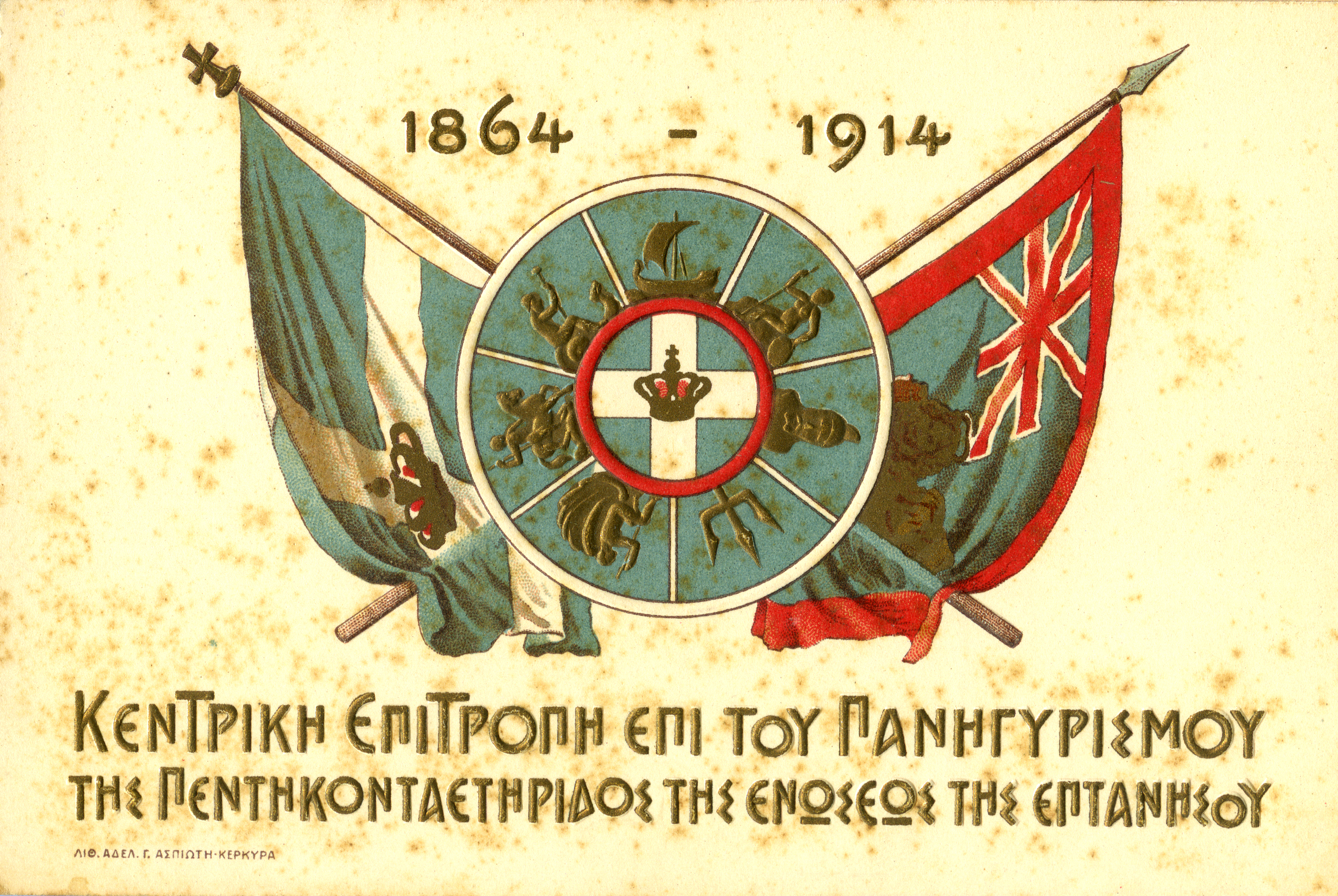
Postal card from 1914 on the 50th anniversary of union with Greece, featuring the flags of Greece and the British protectorate, and the emblems of the seven islands: ancient ship (Corfu), trident (Paxi), Odysseus (Ithaca), Venus (Cythera), Cephalus (Cephalonia), St George (Lefkada), Zacynthus (Zante).

In 1862, Britain decided to transfer the islands to Greece, as a gesture of support intended to bolster the new King's popularity (probably as a counterbalance to the newly established Italian state).

On May 2, 1864, the British departed and the islands became three provinces of the Kingdom of Greece, though Britain retained the use of the port of Corfu. On 21 May 1864 the Ionian Islands officially reunited with Greece. Prince Philippos of Greece and Denmark was born in Corfu in 1921 and grew up to become Britain's Prince Philip, Duke of Edinburgh. In 1923, following orders by Mussolini, the Italians temporarily occupied Corfu.

=== World War II ===
In 1941, when Axis forces occupied Greece, the Ionian Islands (except Kythera) were handed over to the Italians. Long a target of Italian expansionism, the islands' Greek civil authorities were replaced by Italians in preparation for a post-war annexation.

In 1943, the Germans replaced the Italians, and deported the centuries-old Jewish community of Corfu to their deaths. By 1944, most of the islands were under the control of the EAM/ELAS resistance movement, and the islands have remained in general a stronghold of left-wing sentiment ever since.

=== 1953 earthquake ===
The 1953 Ionian islands earthquake occurred with a surface wave magnitude of 7.2 and a maximum Mercalli intensity of X (Extreme) on August 12, 1953. Building damage was extensive and the southern islands of Kefalonia and Zakynthos were practically levelled. The islands were reconstructed from the ground up over the following years under a strict building code. The code has proven extremely effective, as many earthquakes since that time have caused no damage to new buildings.

=== Today ===
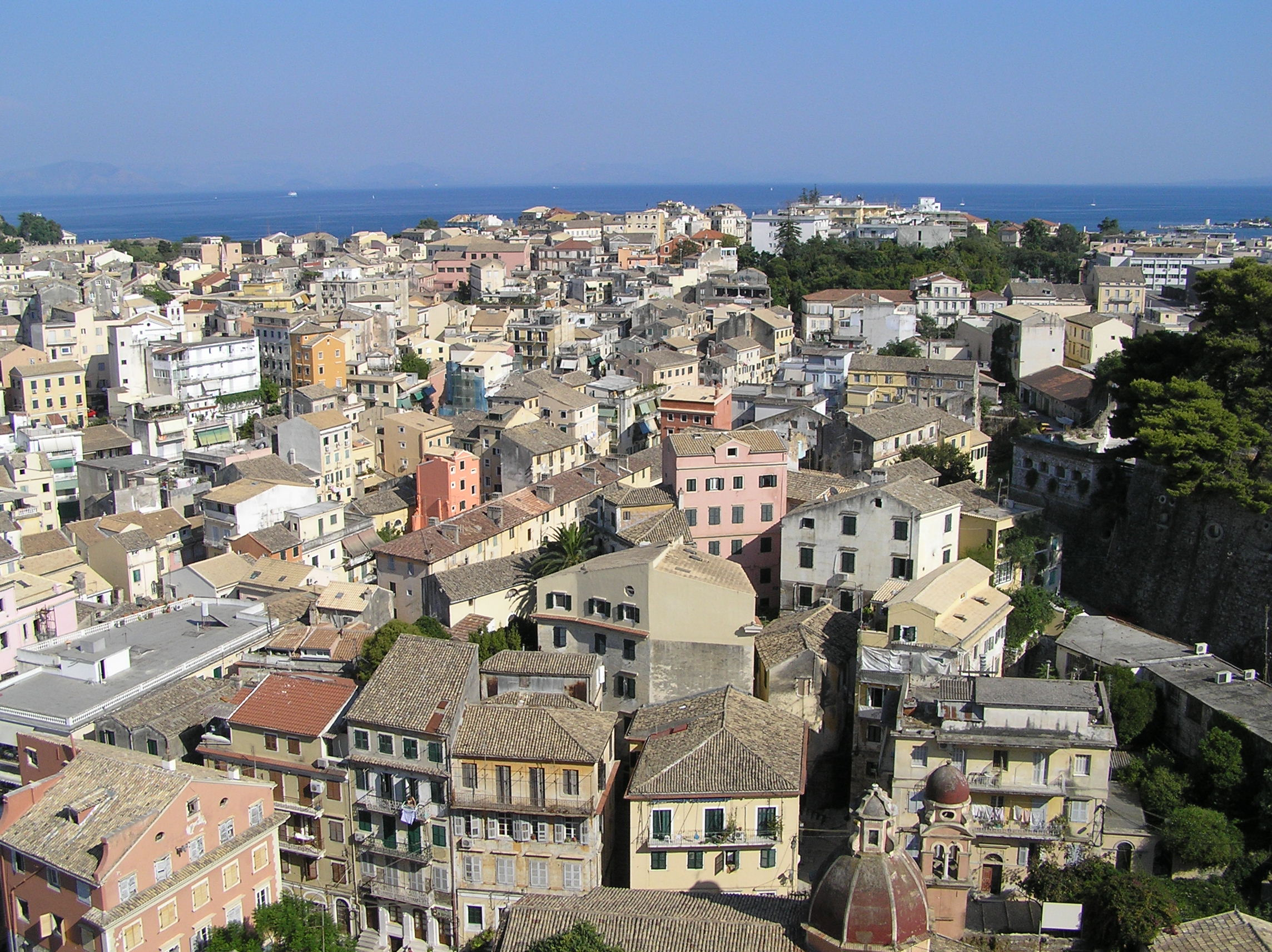
The City of Corfu.

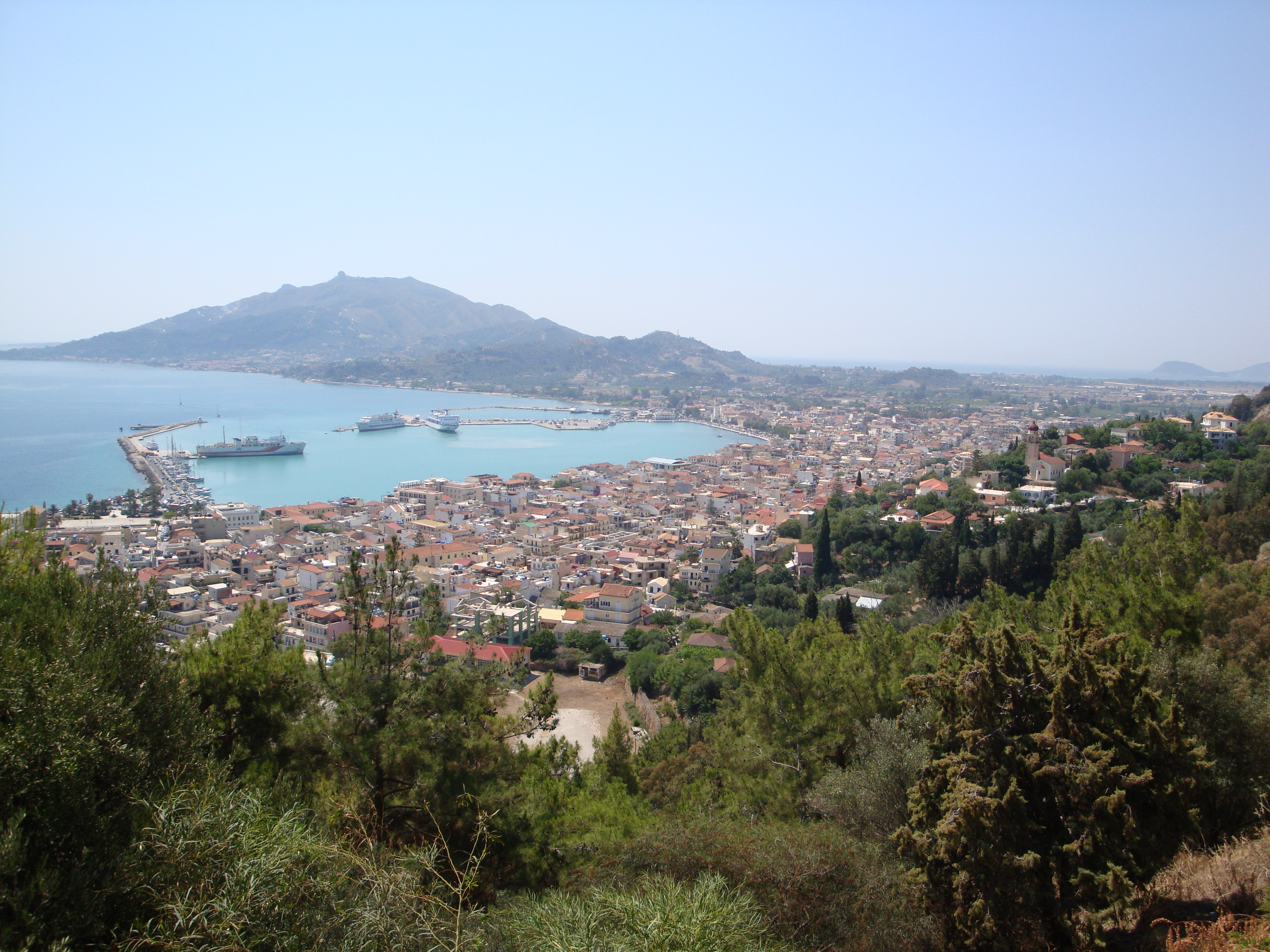
The City of Zakynthos.

Today, all the islands are part of the Greek region of the Ionian Islands (Ionioi Nisoi), except Kythera, which is part of the region of Attica. Corfu has a population of 103,300 (including Paxi), Zante 40,650, Kefallonia 39,579 (including Ithaca), Lefkada 22,536, Ithaca 3,052, Kythera 3,000 and Paxi 2,438.

In recent decades, the islands have lost much of their population through emigration and the decline of their traditional industries, fishing and marginal agriculture. Today, their major industry is tourism. Specifically Corfu, with its harbour, scenery and wealth of ruins and castles, is a favourite stopping place for cruise liners. British tourists in particular are attracted through having read Gerald Durrell's evocative book My Family and Other Animals (1956), which describes his childhood on Kerkyra in the 1930s. The novel and movie Captain Corelli's Mandolin are set in Kefalonia, in which Captain Corelli is part of the Italian occupation force during the Second World War.

== Demographics ==
The Ionian Islands' official population, excluding Kythera, in 2011 was 207,855, decreased by 1.50% compared to the population in 2001. Nevertheless, the region remains the third by population density with 90.1/km^{2} nationwide, well above the national of 81.96/km^{2}. The most populous of the major islands is Corfu with a population of 104,371, followed by Zakynthos (40,759), Kefalonia (35,801), Lefkada (23,693) and Ithaca (3,231). The foreign-born population was in 2001 19,360 or 9.3%, the majority of which was concentrated in Corfu and Zakynthos. Most of them originate from Albania (13,536). The fertility rate for 2011 according to Eurostat was 1.35 live births per woman during her lifetime.

== Economy ==
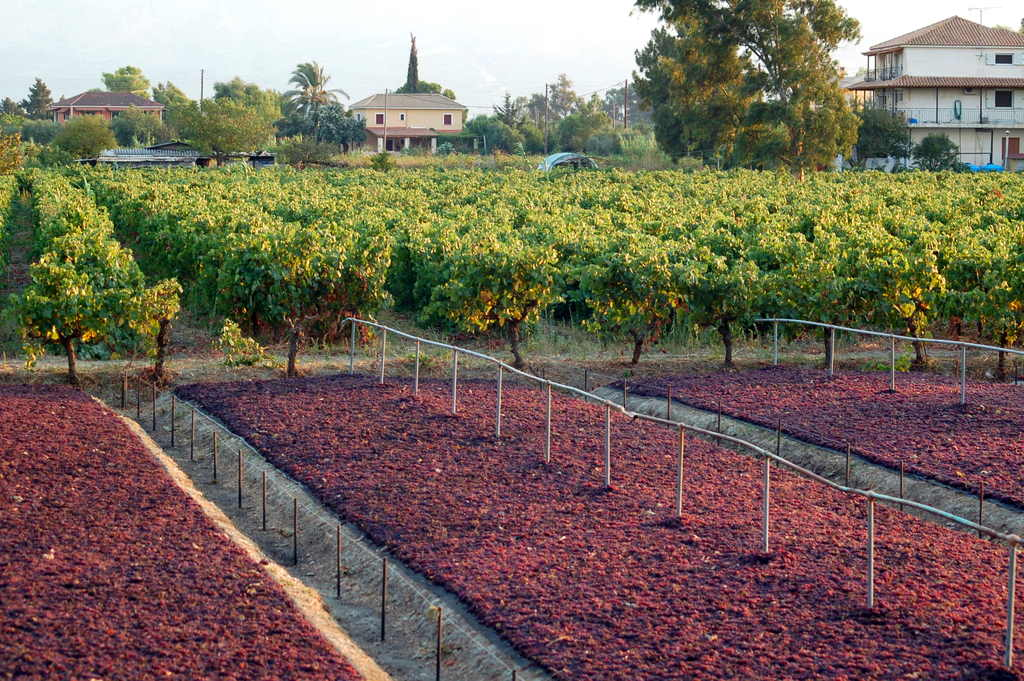
Sun-drying of Zante currant on Zakynthos.

The regional gross domestic product for 2010 was 4,029 million euros. The GDP per capita for the same year was 18,440 euros per capita which was lower than the national median of 20,481. However, the GDP per capita of Kefalonia and Zante, 23,275 and 24,616 respectively, was much higher than the national figure. Additionally, unemployment for 2012 was 14.7, the lowest among all Greek regions, and much lower compared to the national unemployment of 24.2.

=== Tourism ===
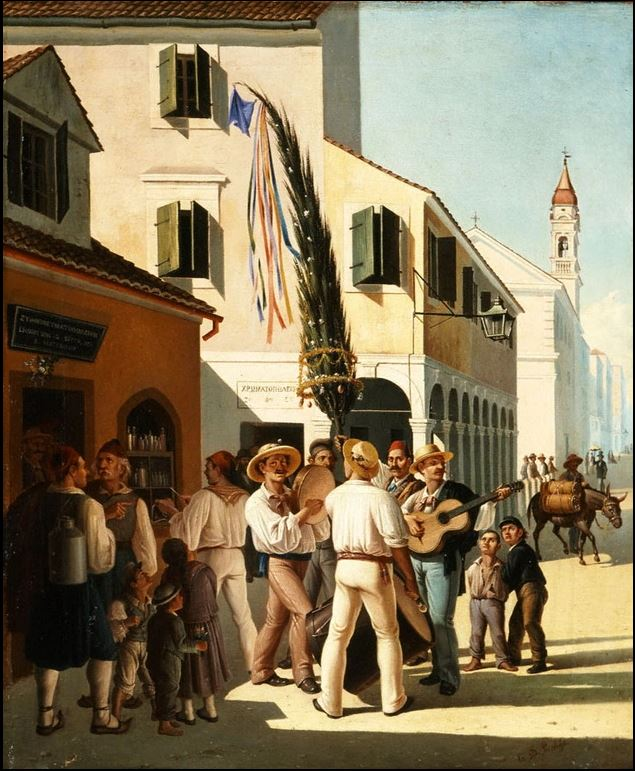
Carnival in Kerkyra by Charalambos Pachis.

The region is a popular tourist destination. The airports of Corfu, Zante and Kefalonia were in the top ten in Greece by number of international arrivals, with 1,386,289 international arrivals for 2012, with Corfu being the sixth airport by number of arrivals nationwide. While Kefalonia Airport had the biggest increase nationwide by 13.11% compared to 2011, while Corfu had an increase of 6.31%.

== Major communities ==
- Argostóli (Αργοστόλι), in Kefalonia
- Kérkyra (Κέρκυρα), in Corfu
- Lefkáda (Λευκάδα), in Lefkada
- Lixouri (Ληξούρι), in Kefalonia
- Zákynthos (Ζάκυνθος), in Zakynthos

== See also ==
- Greek islands
- Homer's Ithaca
- Italian irredentism
- Ionian mode
