= French rule in the Ionian Islands (1807–1814) =

2nd annexation of eastern Greek islands by Napoleonic France

Ionian Islands
- Possession of the First French Empire
- 1807–1814
- Flag

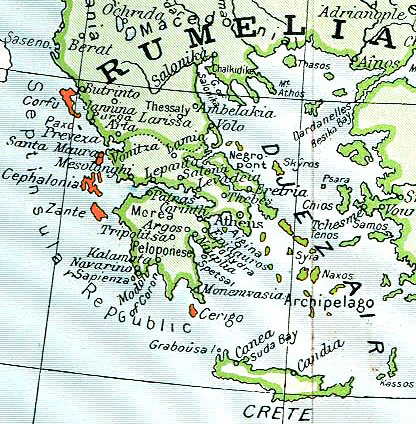
- Map of the Ionian Islands as the "Septinsular Republic" in orange, in 1801; Ottoman territory in green
- Capital: Corfu
- Government
- Governor-general
  - 1807–1808: César Berthier
  - 1808–1814: François-Xavier Donzelot
- Historical era: Napoleonic Wars
  - Treaty of Tilsit: July 1807
  - British occupation of Zakynthos, Cephalonia, Ithaca, and Kythera: October 1809
  - British capture of Lefkada: April 1810
  - British capture of Parga: 22 March 1814
  - Abdication of Napoleon: April 1814
  - Surrender of Corfu: June 1814
Preceded by	Succeeded by
Septinsular Republic	United States of the Ionian Islands
- Today part of: Greece

The second period of French rule in the Ionian Islands (Greek: Δεύτερη Γαλλοκρατία των Επτανήσων) began in August 1807, when the Septinsular Republic, a Russian protectorate comprising the seven Ionian Islands, was occupied by the First French Empire in accordance with the Treaty of Tilsit. The French annexed the Republic but maintained most of its institutions for local governance. In 1809–10, the British occupied the southernmost islands, leaving only Corfu, Paxoi, and the mainland exclave of Parga in French hands. The British also imposed a naval blockade on the French-ruled islands, which began to suffer from famine. Finally, the British occupied Paxoi in late 1813 and Parga in March 1814. Following the Abdication of Napoleon, the French governor-general in Corfu, François-Xavier Donzelot, capitulated and the French garrison was evacuated. In 1815, the islands became a British protectorate, the United States of the Ionian Islands.

== Establishment ==
In the Treaty of Tilsit, concluded in July 1807, Russia ceded the Septinsular Republic to Napoleonic France. On 20 August, French troops landed on Corfu, followed three days later by General César Berthier, who received control of the islands from the Russian admiral Dmitry Senyavin. As the Russians departed, French troops replaced them in all islands, as well as the mainland dependency of Parga. Finally, on 1 September, contrary to his instructions to preserve the Islands' constitution, Berthier as Governor-General declared the annexation of the Septinsular Republic to France.

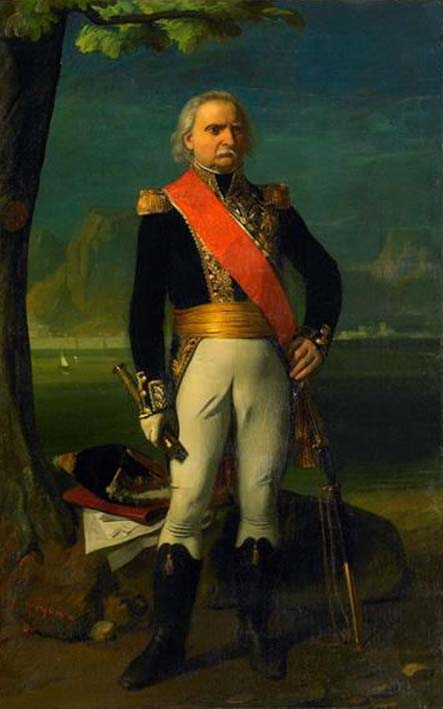
General François-Xavier Donzelot, second French Governor-General of the Ionian Islands (1808–1814)

Berthier moved swiftly to abolish the Republic's attributes as an independent state: the French flag was raised, all public officials and soldiers took an oath of allegiance to Napoleon, the embassies and agencies of the Republic abroad were abolished, and all domestic bodies apart from the courts and the Ionian Senate as well. These measures annoyed Napoleon, who replaced Berthier as Governor-General with François-Xavier Donzelot. His chief task, according to the instructions sent by Napoleon, was to defend the islands, and above all Corfu, against the mounting British threat.

In November 1807, Napoleon regulated the administration of the new French possessions: the internal structure of the Republic was retained largely along the lines of the 1803 Constitution, including the Ionian Senate (although its members were now appointed rather than elected), but the administration was overseen by a Governor-General and an Imperial Commissioner, with Julien Bessières the first to occupy the latter post.

== British attacks on the Ionian Islands ==
The British had reacted to the French takeover of the islands by a naval blockade, which impeded both trade and the supply of the islands. The resulting hardships, and the activities of British agents, inflamed anti-French sentiments, and some Ionian captains petitioned the British commander-in-chief in the Mediterranean, John Stuart, for aid in expelling the French from the islands. Indeed, in October 1809 a British expeditionary force under Brigadier John Oswald arrived at Zakynthos, and issued a proclamation promising to restore the Ionian Islands' liberty and independence. Due to the small size of the French garrisons, the British quickly occupied Zakynthos and Cephalonia (4 October), Ithaca (8 October), and Kythera (12 October), installing provisional administrations according to the existing laws.

The first major military operation was against Lefkada, in April 1810, where Greek auxiliaries under Theodoros Kolokotronis and the British major Richard Church played a particularly important role. Despite strong French resistance, the garrison surrendered on 16 April. On 29 May 1810, on the Paxoi islands a pro-British uprising broke out. The rebels evicted the small French garrison, raised the British flag, and attacked French sympathizers on the islands. However, British troops failed to arrive, and the French in Corfu quickly suppressed the uprising. The British established a Governor-General in Zakynthos (General Oswald until 1810, General George Airey until 1813, and General Sir James Campbell after). Each island was governed by a Governor with a five-member Executive Council, and a local legislative assembly, the Administrative Body. While the British-controlled islands returned to normality, the French-held islands of Corfu and Paxoi, under Donzelot and Imperial Commissioner Mathieu de Lesseps, suffered from the effects of the British blockade, which became official on 10 November 1810.

== Military ==
During the French occupation of the islands, the Imperial Army and Imperial Navy provided protection, though local units were also raised in the area.

=== Navy ===
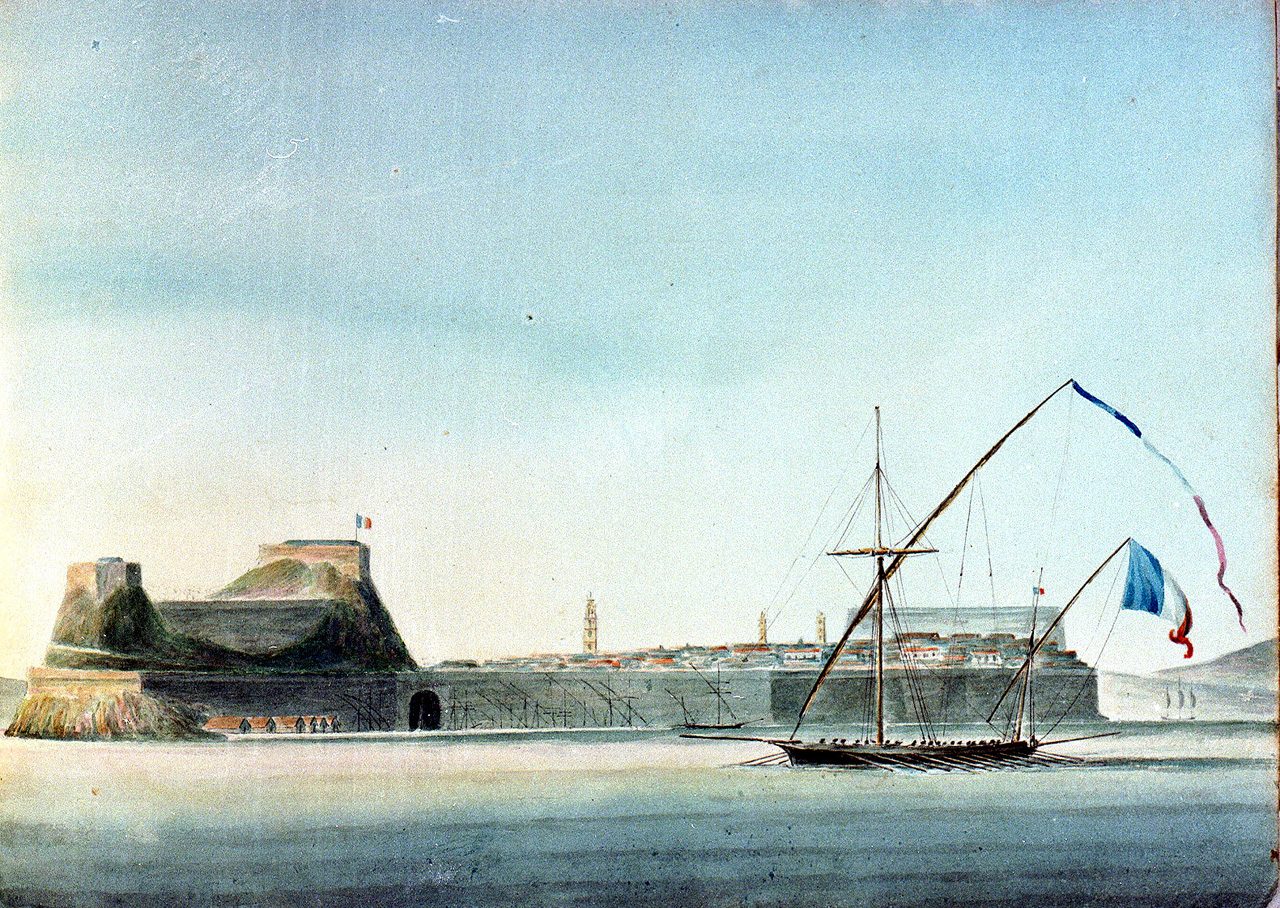
A French-flagged xebec in front of the Old Fortress of Corfu, during the second period of French rule. Painting by the British naval officer William Pocock

The naval element was provided by the Adriatic Squadron (Escadron Adriatique), an ad-hoc sub-component of the Imperial Navy's Mediterranean Squadron. This squadron was based in Naples, the capital of the client Kingdom of Naples, and maintained a forward base in Corfu. However, the Mediterranean Squadron had much trouble supplying the island, usually leaving it only lightly guarded with several corvettes, gunboats and xebecs.

=== Army ===
Local ground forces were provided by several auxiliary units, local militia, and armed citizenry. Below is the list of units which were formed within the islands:

- Ionian Mounted Chasseurs (Chasseurs à Cheval Ioniens) – raised 27 November 1807 from cadre of the 25th Chasseurs à Cheval Regiment serving in the Army of Naples. The strength of the unit its in provisional form of 128 officers and men by the December 1808 decree. The structure was the same as for a company of French line Chasseurs. Transported back to France following the Treaty of Fontainebleau and incorporated into the 6th Light Cavalry Lancers Regiment in Lyon on 12 September 1814.
- Albanian Regiment (Régiment Albanais) – formed on 12 October 1807 with a nominal strength of three battalions of 9 companies each, but this was never achieved. The decree to form the regiment stated it would consist of a staff and six battalions, giving it a strength of 160 officers and 2,934 men. On 6 November 1813, the size of the regiment was reduced to a staff and two battalions, each consisting of one elite company and five of fusiliers. The strength of each company was also reduced to three officers and 100 other ranks. Following the surrender of Corfu in 1814, the regiment passed under the control of the new Commander-in-Chief and Governor of the British Ionian Islands, Sir James Campbell, 1st Baronet who allowed it to dissolve through attrition.
- Septinsular Battalion (Bataillon Septinsulaire) — raised on 13 September 1807 from troops of the old Venetian possessions in Dalmatia, providing local defence on the island of Corfu. There was much difficulty in recruiting native Ionians which led to the enlistment of Italians, Neapolitans, Dalmatians, and even Austrian prisoners. At one point a proposal was made to incorporate Spanish prisoners into the unit, but this was rejected by Napoleon, who pointed out that they might consume precious rations and then betray the French at the first opportunity. The battalion was disbanded in 1812 with its remnants being incorporated into the Ionian Sappers.
- Greek Foot Chasseurs (Chasseurs à Pied Grecs) – formed on 10 March 1808 from Greek refugees found in the Ionian Islands. Comprising eight companies, including three elite, effective strength of 951 men. Incorporated into the Régiment Albanais on 1 July 1809.
- Albanian Pandours (Pandours Albanais) – formed on 1 June 1810 at battalion size, composed of six companies of 50 men. On 8 November 1811, its size was increased to 8 companies and the name was changed to the Albanian Battalion (Bataillon Albanais).
- Pandours of Dalmatia (Pandours de Dalmatie) – formed on 17 March 1810 of 9 companies, each of either 36 or 48 pandours, though 200 auxiliary pandours could be called up from the local population if needed at company strength.
- Septinsular Artillery (Artillerie Septinsulaire) — raised on 1 January 1808 at a strength of one battalion with six companies of 150 men each. Size was increased to nine companies on 1 January 1808, but the number of men per company was reduced to 100. In 1813 a company of veterans and a company of gendarmerie were added. Disbanded in May 1814 after the Treaty of Fontainebleau.
- Ionian Sappers (Sapeurs Ioniens) – formed on 7 August 1812 by combining the 9th Company of the White Pioneers along with remnants of the old Septinsular Battalion, though only contained 1 company. Repatriated to France after the Treaty of Fontainbleau, and finally disbanded at Lyon on 5 September 1814.
- Septinsular Gendarmes (Gendarmes Septinsulaires)
- Ionian Veterans (Vétérans Ioniens) – unknown history

== End of French rule and aftermath ==
Finally, Paxoi was occupied by the British in early 1813, followed by Parga on 22 March 1814, after a popular uprising evicted the French. Corfu held out until the first downfall of Napoleon and the restoration of Louis XVIII: The armistice of 23 April [O.S. 11 April] 1814 obliged the French to evacuate Corfu. In June, Donzelot surrendered the island to Campbell.

The Ionian Senate, declaring that the Septinsular Republic had been suspended but not abolished under the French and British occupations, tried to advocate for the independence of the Islands in the Congress of Vienna, but Campbell refused to accept this view, holding that the Republic had ceased to exist after Tilsit, and regarding the French-appointed Senate as not representative of the Ionian people. In the end, the Ionian Islands were formed into a British protectorate, the "United States of the Ionian Islands", which existed until the islands were united with the Kingdom of Greece in 1864.

== See also ==
- Albanian Regiment (France)
- Spianada

== Sources ==
- Baeyens, Jacques (1973). Les Français à Corfou, 1797-1799 et 1807-1814 [The French in Corfu, 1797-1799 and 1807-1814] (in French). Athens: Institut français d'Athènes. OCLC 2763024.
- Dempsey, Guy C. (2002). Napoleon's Mercenaries: Foreign Units in the French Army Under the Consulate and Empire, 1799 to 1814. Barnsley, South Yorkshire: Greenhill Books. ISBN 978-1853674884. OCLC 474117429.
- Humble, Richard (2019). Napoleon's Admirals: Flag Officers of the Arc de Triomphe, 1789–1815. Oxford: Casemate Publishers. ISBN 978-1612008080. OCLC 1137146843.
- Karapidakis, Nikos (2003). "Τα Επτάνησα: Ευρωπαϊκοί ανταγωνισμοί μετά την πτώση της Βενετίας" [The Heptanese: European rivalries after the fall of Venice]. Ιστορία του Νέου Ελληνισμού 1770-2000, Τόμος 1: Η Οθωμανική κυριαρχία, 1770-1821 [History of Modern Hellenism 1770-2000, Volume 1: Ottoman rule, 1770-1821] (in Greek). Athens: Ellinika Grammata. pp. 151–184. ISBN 960-406-540-8.
- Mackridge, Peter (2014). "Introduction". In Anthony Hirst; Patrick Sammon (eds.). The Ionian Islands: Aspects of their History and Culture. Cambridge Scholars Publishing. pp. 1–23. ISBN 978-1-4438-6278-3.
- Moschonas, Nikolaos (1975). "Τα Ιόνια Νησιά κατά την περίοδο 1797-1821" [The Ionian Islands in the period 1797-1821]. In Christopoulos, Georgios A. & Bastias, Ioannis K. (eds.). Ιστορία του Ελληνικού Έθνους [History of the Greek Nation] (in Greek). Vol. ΙΑ: Ο Ελληνισμός υπό ξένη κυριαρχία (περίοδος 1669 - 1821), Τουρκοκρατία - Λατινοκρατία [Hellenism under Foreign Rule (Period 1669 - 1821), Turkocracy – Latinocracy]. Athens: Ekdotiki Athinon. pp. 382–402. ISBN 978-960-213-100-8.
- Vakalopoulos, Apostolos E. (1973). Ιστορία του νέου ελληνισμού, Τόμος Δ′: Τουρκοκρατία 1669–1812 – Η οικονομική άνοδος και ο φωτισμός του γένους (Έκδοση Β′) [History of modern Hellenism, Volume IV: Turkish rule 1669–1812 – Economic upturn and enlightenment of the nation (2nd Edition)] (in Greek). Thessaloniki: Emm. Sfakianakis & Sons.
