= Dionysios Romas =

Greek nobleman

- Διονύσιος Ρώμας
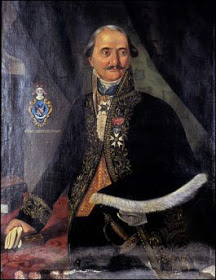
- Portrait of Dionysios Romas (1830) in Romas Museum, Zakynthos

Senator
- In office ?–1817
- Monarch: George III

Member of the Council of State
- Monarch: Otto

Personal details
- Born: 1771 Zakynthos, Republic of Venice (now Greece)
- Died: 1857 (aged 85–86) Zakynthos, United States of the Ionian Islands (now Greece)
- Awards: Commander of the Order of the Redeemer; Legion of Honour

Count Dionyssios De Roma or Dionysios Romas (Greek: Διονύσιος Ρώμας; 1771–1857) was a Greek nobleman of Venetian ancestry, Freemason, lawyer and diplomat from Zakynthos, who was active in the preparation and execution of the Greek War of Independence.

== Life ==
=== Early life and career ===
Dionyssios De Roma hailed from Zakynthos (Zante), one of the Ionian Islands off the western coast of mainland Greece. His family was among the noble families of the island, and gained the rank of count from the Republic of Venice, which ruled the Islands until 1797. Romas was born c. 1771. His father, Conte Giorgio di Roma, (1725-1796), served as Venetian consul in the Ottoman provinces of the Morea and Rumelia. His father was married in 1767 to Diamantina dei Conti Capnissi, the heiress of the Chapnissi mansion, was the last of her Venetian-Greek branch of the Capnissi family. Romas studied in Italy and Paris, before returning to his homeland and taking over his father's post as Venetian consul. He may have been in contact with the Greek revolutionary writer Rigas Feraios, and a member of Feraios' secret society, but this is uncertain.

During the time of the Septinsular Republic (1800–1807), Romas conspired with military leaders from the mainland, who had fled to the Ionian Islands and served in the Russian-sponsored Greek Legion, for an uprising against Ottoman rule. Romas gained the backing of the Kolokotronis family and of the Moreot Turkish notable Ali Farmaki, but the Russian ambassador, Giorgio Mocenigo, refused to support the idea. When the Islands came under French rule in 1807, Romas was appointed a senator and chairman of the council of justice by Governor-General François-Xavier Donzelot. On the birth of Napoleon II, the son and heir of Napoleon, Romas was a member of an Ionian delegation sent to Paris to congratulate the French emperor. Romas gained access to senior members of the French government, including Napoleon himself, and was awarded the Legion of Honour. His efforts to secure French support for the liberation of Greece, however, went nowhere.

Under the subsequent British rule, Romas served as a member of the Ionian Senate in Corfu, before being dismissed in 1817 due to his liberal and nationalist views. Romas also served as grand master of the masonic lodges in Corfu and his native Zakynthos. In the lead-up to the Greek War of Independence, he joined the secret society preparing the uprising, the Filiki Etaireia, in 1819. He offered 300 gold coins to the cause and became one of the society's leaders in the Ionian Islands. Romas fell under suspicion by the Islands' British governor, Thomas Maitland, but was able to successfully dispel the latter's doubts. In early 1821, shortly before the outbreak of the War of Independence, he left the Islands for Venice.

=== Freemasonry ===
Dionisios Romas was keen to establish recognition. First, on 21 November 1811, he applied to the Grand Orient de France to make it a Provincial Mother Lodge. This was accepted and new lodges sprung up. A new political reality emerged in 1815, when the United States of the Ionian Islands was established under the protection of the British Empire. At this time, Romas renamed the lodge the Serene Grand Lodge of Greece and eventually lodges were formed at Zante, Cephalonia, Lefkas and Patras. Roma decided to ask his friend, Augustus, Duke of Sussex, who was then the Grand Master of the United Grand Lodge of England, if he would become the Grand Master. Politically, Romas was hoping to get the British onside for the liberation of Greece from the Ottoman Empire (on the eve of the Greek War of Independence).

=== Greek War of Independence ===
Romas was engaged in support of the war from Venice, advocating for the Greek cause to the Great Powers and Pope Pius VII. Romas became more active from 1824 on, when he returned to Zakynthos, and founded, along with fellow Etaireia members and freemasons Panagiotis Marinos Stefanou and Konstatinos Dragonas, the so-called 'Zakynthos Committee'. Using Zakynthos as their base, the Committee organized the shipment of volunteers, correspondence, supplies, equipment and ammunition to the Greek rebels. Romas in particular was busy in corresponding with the various philhellenic committees in Europe, as well as the princes of Serbia and Montenegro. In addition, the committee was active in trying to secure British support for the Greek uprising, and was instrumental in the so-called 'Act of Submission' of 1825, in which the provisional Greek administration and the main Greek political and military leaders sought the protection of Britain. Romas himself drafted the petition in Italian.

=== Later life ===
After the establishment of independent Greece, Romas settled there. In 1833, he was arrested as being involved in the supposed conspiracy of Theodoros Kolokotronis and Dimitris Plapoutas against the regency for King Otto. Romas was found guilty in the first instance, but cleared of all charges on appeal. King Otto awarded him with the Commander's Cross of the Order of the Redeemer (his oldest son also received the Silver Cross of the Redeemer), and appointed him to the Council of State. In the last years of his life, Romas retired from politics to his home island.

The British governor of the Ionian Islands, Henry George Ward, attempted to enlist Romas in his attempts to quell the rising movement for union with Greece, offering him the Grand Cross of St. Michael and St. George, and a seat in the Ionian Senate for his son. Romas politely refused, stating that he never knew himself to have served Great Britain. He died at Zakynthos on 8 August [O.S. 27 July] 1857.

== Sources ==
- Angelomatis-Tsougarakis, Eleni (2021). "Ionian Islands". In Kitromilides, Paschalis M.; Tsoukalas, Constantinos (eds.). The Greek Revolution: A Critical Dictionary. Cambridge, Massachusetts and London: Belknap Press. pp. 219–231. ISBN 9780674987432.
- Goudas, Anastasios N. (1871). Βίοι Παράλληλοι τῶν ἐπὶ τῆς Ἀναγεννήσεως τῆς Ἑλλάδος διαπρεψάντων ἀνδρῶν, Τόμος ΣΤ΄ [Parallel Lives of the Men Distinguished in the Rebirth of Greece, Volume VI] (in Greek). Athens: Ch. N. Filadelfefs.
