= Treaty of Constantinople (1800) =

Russian and Ottoman agreement creating the Septinsular Republic

The Treaty of Constantinople of 2 April [O.S. 21 March] 1800 was concluded between the Ottoman Empire and the Russian Empire, and heralded the creation of the Septinsular Republic, the first autonomous Greek state since the fall of the Byzantine Empire in 1453.

The new state comprised the Ionian Islands, seven islands off the western coast of Greece, that had been under Venetian rule for centuries, and thus had escaped Ottoman conquest, unlike the Greek mainland. Following the fall of the Republic of Venice in 1797, the islands had come under French rule. Initially popular, the French quickly alienated the Greeks with their anti-clerical policies, and especially the islands' native nobility, with their republican ideals. In 1798, the Russians and Ottomans launched a joint expedition against the French-held islands, culminating in the capture of Corfu in 1799. In the aftermath, representatives of the islands' nobility went to the Ottoman capital, Constantinople, and the Russian capital, Saint Petersburg, to secure the island's self-governance. The resulting negotiations led to the creation of the Septinsular Republic as a federal republic under the suzerainty of the Ottoman sultan. A conservative and reactionary constitution, the so-called "Byzantine Constitution", was issued at the same time, and enshrined the dominance of the nobility in the Islands' affairs. In practice, the islands remained under Russian rather than Ottoman influence, and domestic political developments resulted in the adoption of a new constitution as early as 1801. The Septinsular Republic itself would survive until 1807, when it was annexed to Napoleon's French Empire under the Treaty of Tilsit.

== Background ==
The Ionian Islands (Corfu, Paxoi, Zakynthos, Kefalonia, Lefkada, Ithaca, and Kythira) along with a handful of exclaves on the Epirote mainland, namely the coastal towns of Parga, Preveza, Vonitsa, and Butrinto, had been Venetian possessions for centuries, thereby becoming the only part of the Greek world to escape conquest by the Ottoman Empire. Following the Fall of the Republic of Venice in 1797, the islands came under French control, with French troops disembarking on Corfu on 28 June 1797. The French were welcomed by the populace, and the radical ideas of the French Revolution were implemented with the abolition of the local nobility and the installation of democratic regimes and local self-government on the islands. In the Treaty of Campo Formio, the islands were annexed as French departments.

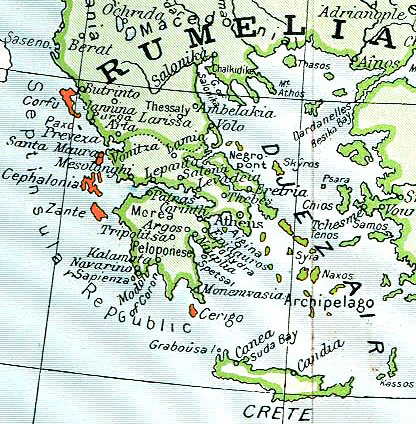
Map of the Septinsular Republic in orange, in 1801; Ottoman territory in green

The French presence was resented by the local aristocracy, now deprived of its privileges, while the heavy taxation and anti-clericalism of the French soon made them unpopular with broad sections of the common populace as well. Following the French invasion of Egypt furthermore, the French presence in the Ionian Islands aroused the opposition of the Ottomans and the Russian Empire. In autumn 1798, a joint Russo-Ottoman fleet evicted the French from the other islands and finally captured Corfu in March 1799, while the autonomous Ottoman strongman Ali Pasha of Yanina took the opportunity to seize Butrinto, Preveza, and Vonitsa from the French. In all the islands they occupied, the Russians installed provisional administrations of nobles and burghers. Very soon, the Russian authorities invited assemblies of the nobles to undertake the governance of the Ionian Islands, thereby restoring the previous status quo. On 6 May, the commanders of the two fleets announced that the Ionian Islands would comprise a unitary state, governed by a Senate (Γερουσία) in Corfu city, composed of three representatives each from Corfu, Cephalonia, and Zakynthos, two from Lefkada, and one each from Ithaca, Kythira, and Paxoi. The Venetian nobleman Angelo Orio, the last Venetian provveditore of Argostoli, was appointed head of the Senate, and entrusted with the creation of a constitution for the new state. Orio's constitution envisaged a thoroughly aristocratic regime, with each island headed by a Great Council composed of the nobles and the upper bourgeoisie. The Great Councils would elect the senators. Each island would retain a local administration and a treasury, but a central treasury would exist in Corfu. The Senate was the ultimate executive authority, and its chairman the head of state. A Small Council of 40 would be elected by the Great Councils of the three largest islands, and would be responsible for justice, the selection of officials, and advising on legislation.

On 21 June 1799, the Senate decided to send a twelve-member delegation to Constantinople and Saint Petersburg to express its gratitude to the Sultan and Tsar, but also press for the restoration of the Islands' maritime and land frontier with the withdrawal of Ali Pasha from Butrinto, Preveza, and Vonitsa, and their recognition as an independent state. As Angelo Orio participated in the delegation, he was replaced as head of the Senate by Count Spyridon Georgios Theotokis. Once in Constantinople, however, the delegation quickly realized that the Porte was not interested in recognizing the Islands' independence, but rather in creating a vassal state under Ottoman suzerainty. At the suggestion of the Russian ambassador, Vasily Tomara, the delegation submitted a memorandum to the other ambassadors, requesting the recognition of the Islands as an independent and federal state, under the protection of the European powers. Two of the delegates, the Corfiot Count Antonios Maria Kapodistrias and the Zakynthian Count Nikolaos Gradenigos Sigouros Desyllas remained in Constantinople to conduct negotiations with the Porte, while Orio and another delegate, Kladas, were to represent the Ionian cause in Saint Petersburg.

== Provisions of the treaty ==
The negotiations and mutual rivalries between Russia, the Porte, and the Islanders, led to the signing of the Treaty of Constantinople on 21 March 1800, which created the first autonomous Greek state since the Fall of the Byzantine Empire.

According to the provisions of the treaty, the Ionian Islands would be a unitary, autonomous state, under the name "Republic of the Seven United Islands" (Greek: Πολιτεία τῶν Ἑπτὰ Ἑνωμένων Νήσων). It would follow the long-established model of the Republic of Ragusa, being an aristocratic republic led by the "primates and notables", and under Ottoman suzerainty, as token of which they would pay an annual tribute of 75,000 piastres to the Sultan. This was a victory for the Sultan, and a disappointment for the Islanders, who had been promised the right to choose their own form of governance in the proclamations of the Ecumenical Patriarch of Constantinople, Gregory V, and the head of the Russian fleet, Admiral Fyodor Ushakov. The new state's constitution, once agreed, would be approved by the signatory powers. As the new state lacked military forces, Russian and Ottoman forces would remain to garrison its forts and guarantee its security until the end of the war against France.

The mainland exclaves of Parga, Vonitsa, Preveza, and Butrinto, would come under Ottoman control but would enjoy a special status similar to that of the Danubian Principalities: they would enjoy special privileges as to the practice of the Christian religion and administration of justice, and no Muslim would be allowed to own land or settle there, apart from the Ottoman commandant. Taxation was also set at no more than had been under Venetian rule, and a two-year tax exemption was announced to recover from the effects of French rule and the war.

== The "Byzantine" Constitution and ratification ==
Flag of the Septinsular Republic

Capodistrias and Sigouros Desyllas also composed a draft for the new constitution, and designed the new flag of the state. The so-called "Byzantine" Constitution, as it was composed in Constantinople (Byzantion), comprised 37 articles. It envisaged an aristocratic federal republic, with a local administration on every island, headed by three syndics, to be chosen annually from the Great Council of the nobles of each island. The syndics elected a prytanis as head of administration for four-month tenures. The Senate in Corfu remained the highest authority of the federal state, composed of the representatives of the islands. Its chairman, the archon, was the head of state. In keeping with the reactionary ideas embodied in the constitution was also the new flag, sporting the Venetian Lion of Saint Mark holding a bundle of seven arrows, symbolizing the islands, and a Bible; more radical suggestions, such as the rising phoenix, were rejected.

On 1 November 1800, the delegates were received by the Grand Vizier, who presented them with the new constitution, a diploma recognizing the autonomy of the Republic and regulated its relations to the Porte, and the new flag. Then a solemn procession brought them to the Ecumenical Patriarchate in Phanar, where Patriarch Neophytus VII blessed the flag of the new state. The treaty was recognized, and adhered to, by the United Kingdom in January 1801.

== Aftermath ==
The new regime envisaged in the "Byzantine" Constitution proved short-lived, as popular reaction led to the adoption of new constitutions in 1801 and 1803. The Septinsular Republic survived until the reimposition of French rule in 1807, following the Treaty of Tilsit. The British soon challenged the French for mastery, and in 1809 took control of most of the islands; Corfu surrendered following the resignation of Napoleon in 1814. In 1815 the British established the United States of the Ionian Islands.

== Sources ==
- Moschonas, Nikolaos (1975). "Τα Ιόνια Νησιά κατά την περίοδο 1797–1821" [The Ionian Islands in the period 1797–1821]. In Christopoulos, Georgios A. & Bastias, Ioannis K. (eds.). Ιστορία του Ελληνικού Έθνους, Τόμος ΙΑ΄: Ο Ελληνισμός υπό ξένη κυριαρχία (περίοδος 1669 - 1821), Τουρκοκρατία - Λατινοκρατία [History of the Greek Nation, Volume XI: Hellenism under Foreign Rule (Period 1669 - 1821), Turkocracy – Latinocracy] (in Greek). Vol. 11. Athens: Ekdotiki Athinon. pp. 382–402. ISBN 978-960-213-100-8.
