= Theotokis family =

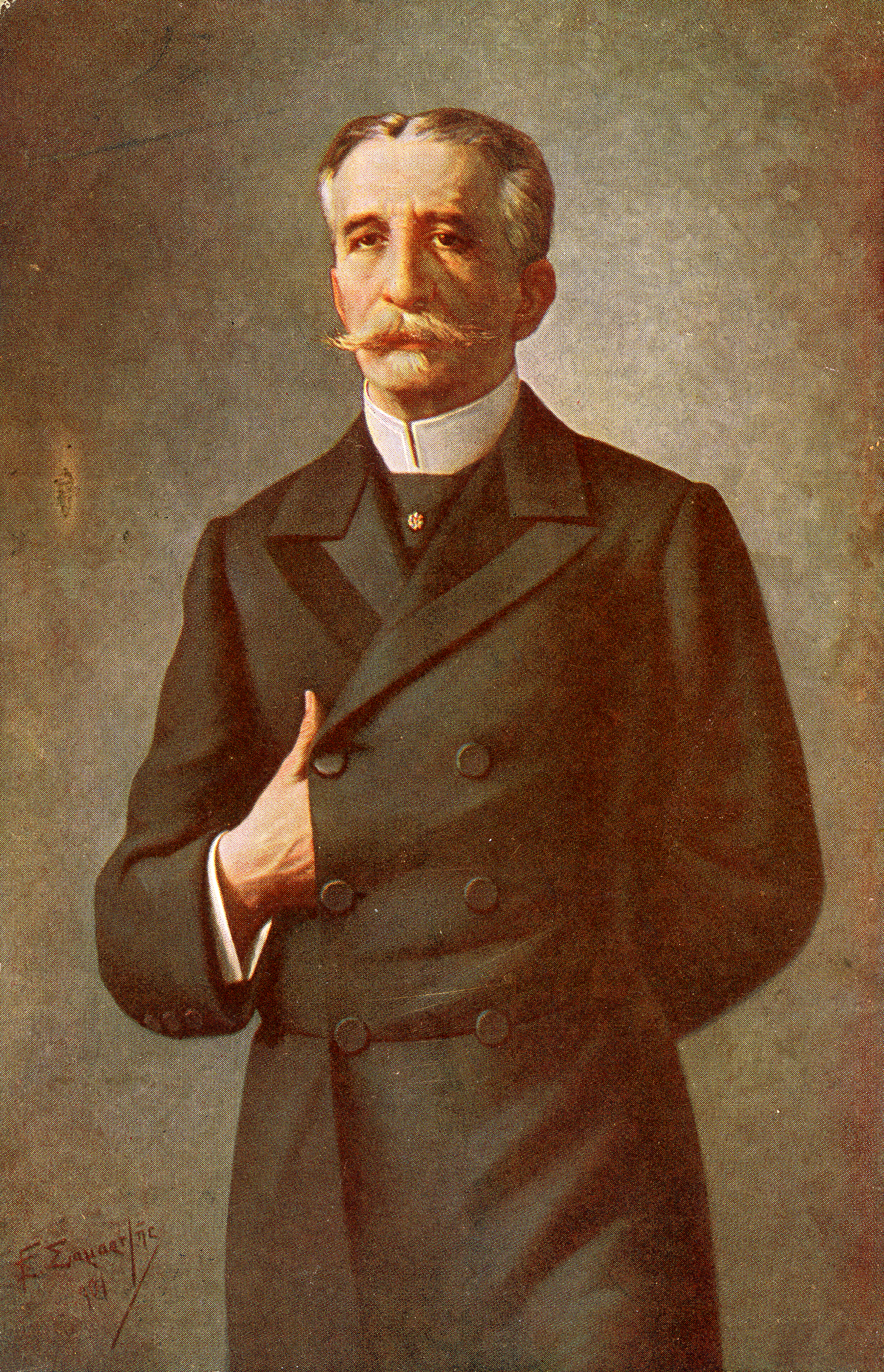
Georgios Theotokis (1844–1916), four times Prime Minister of Greece

The Theotokis family (Greek: Θεοτόκης, Theotókēs), in Italian and older English literature Theotochi or Teotochi, is a Greek aristocratic family from Corfu.

== History ==
The family are an old landowning family in Corfu, Greece, several members of which have been prominent politicians. They originally hailed from Constantinople, whence they fled following its fall to the Ottomans, eventually settling in Corfu. The painter El Greco (Domenico Theotokopoulos) was descended from a branch of the same family that fled to Crete. The Corfiote branch was ennobled by the Republic of Venice and was entered in the Libro d'Oro; they used to be commonly referred to as Counts (Cónte), but their titles lapsed when the Ionian Islands became part of the Kingdom of Greece, which did not recognise noble titles.

As the family prospered, nicknames were devised to distinguish between the various male-line Theotokis. The Greek genealogist Evgenios Rizos-Rangavis distinguished the following branches:

- The Calocardarei (Καλοκαρδαρέοι) or Spilia (της Σπηλιάς, "of the cave"), from a quarter of the city of Corfu where they resided. Its members bore the title of count.
- The Stathachi (Σταθάκοι) or del Santo (του Αγίου, "of the Saint"), due to the proximity of their residence to the church of Corfu's patron, Saint Spyridon. Its members bore the title of baron.
- The Sclebuni (Σκλεμπούνοι)
- The Zammarco (Ζαμμάρκο, του Σαν Μάρκο), from Saint Mark (San Marco in Italian), the patron of Venice.
- The D'Aviazzo (Νταβιάτζο) or Politikoí (Πολιτικοί), who became a distinguished political dynasty in Greece.
- The Andrucelli (Ανδρουτσέλλοι). Its members bore the title of count.

== Notable members ==
=== Calocardarei branch ===
This branch received the title of count in the primogeniture by Charles III Ferdinand, Duke of Mantua. On 10 October 1796, the Doge of Venice, Ludovico Manin extended the title to all members of the family.

- Alexander Theotokis (Αλέξανδρος Θεοτόκης, 1516–1600), soldier, fought in the Siege of Corfu (1537), taken captive by the Ottomans until ransomed in 1573, later provedditore in Venetian service.
- Nicholas Theotokis, son of George (Νικόλαος Γ. Θεοτόκης, died 1603), nephew of the above, Venetian governor of Parga in 1591
- Nicholas Theotokis, son of Mark (Νικόλαος Μ. Θεοτόκης, 1631–1686), grandson of the above, as reward for his service during the War of Candia, in 1699 his descendants received the title of count.
- Count George Theotokis (Γεώργιος Θεοτόκης, 1677–1734), soldier and statesman, son of the above, fought at the Siege of Corfu (1716) with his brothers Mark and Giambattista.
- Count Nicholas-Alvise Theotokis (Νικόλαος Αλοΐσιος Θεοτόκης, 1702–1762), son of the above, ambassador to Venice from 1746
- Count Spyridon Georgios Theotokis (Σπυρίδων Γεώργιος Θεοτόκης, 1722–1803), son of the above, president of the Ionian Senate and head of state of the Septinsular Republic with the title of Prince
  - Countess Isabella Teotochi Albrizzi, daughter of Anthony (Ισαβέλλα Θεοτόκη-Αλμπρίτζι, Corfu 1760 – Venice 1836), niece of the above, writer and art lover, held a notable literary salon at Venice
  - Count Alvise Theotokis (Αλοΐσιος Θεοτόκης, 1766–1828), brother of the previous
    - Count Mark-Alvise Theotokis, son of Spyridon (Μάρκος-Αλοΐσιος Θεοτόκης, 1824–1912), grandson of the above, historian and director of the Senate archives at Corfu
      - Konstantinos Theotokis (Κωνσταντίνος Θεοτόκης, 1872–1923), son of the above, writer of the Heptanese School.
      - Dimitrios Theotokis (Δημήτριος Θεοτόκης, 1874–1923), brother of the above, officer, fought in the Asia Minor Campaign as commander of the Independent Division.
      - Spyridon Theotokis (Σπυρίδων Θεοτόκης, 1876–1940), brother of the above, historian, director of the Senate archives at Corfu and of the Archives of Venice

=== Stathachi branch ===
This branch received the title of baron in primogeniture by Napoleon I on 7 February 1812

- Nikephoros Theotokis (Νικηφόρος Θεοτόκης, Corfu 1731 – Moscoe 1800), theologian and philosopher, important figure of the Greek Enlightenment, archbishop of Astrakhan and Stavropol
  - Baron Emmanuel Theotokis, son of Eustathios (Εμμανουήλ Θεοτόκης, 1777–1837), nephew of the above, president of the Ionian Senate, named baron by Napoleon I in 1812, awarded a knighthood by the British in 1818
    - Baron Andreas Theotokis (Ανδρέας Θεοτόκης, 1802–1889), son of the above, scholar and deputy of the Ionian Assembly

=== D'Aviazzo branch ===
- Ioannis Vaptistis Theotokis (Ιωάννης Βαπτιστής Θεοτόκης; 1777–1865), member of the Filiki Etaireia, senator and minister in the Kingdom of Greece
  - Spyridon Theotokis (Σπυρίδων Θεοτόκης, 1811–1870), son of the above, married in 1841 the English writer Jane Digby
    - Michail Theotokis, son of Nicholas-Andreas (Μιχαήλ Θεοτόκης; 1842–1916), nephew of the above, mayor of Corfu (1887–1895), MP (1902–1915) and Speaker of the Hellenic Parliament (1916)
    - Georgios Theotokis (Γεώργιος Θεοτόκης; 1844–1919), brother of the above, four times Prime Minister of Greece between 1899 and 1909
      - Nikolaos Theotokis (Νικόλαος Θεοτόκης; 1878–1922), son of the above, politician, executed after the Trial of the Six, acquitted posthumously in 2010
      - Ioannis Theotokis commonly called John (Ιωάννης [Τζόν] Θεοτόκης; 1880–1961), brother of the above, Prime Minister of Greece in 1950
        - Spyros Theotokis (Σπύρος Θεοτόκης; 1908–1988), son of Ioannis Theotokis and Maria Kambas, politician, several times MP for Corfu, and minister
        - Elisabeth (Lulu) Theotoky (Ελισάβετ Θεοτόκη; 1924-2013), daughter Ioannis Theotokis, choreographer and researcher
          - Joanna Poyago-Theotoky (Ιωάννα (Τζοάννα) Πογιάγο-Θεοτόκη), daughter of Elisabeth (Lulu) Theotoky, Professor of economics
        - George Theotoky (Γεώργιος Θεοτόκης; 1926-2021), son of Ioannis Theotokis, businessman
      - Zaïra Ralli, née Theotoki (Ζαΐρα Θεοτόκη-Ράλλη), sister of Nikolaos and John, wife of Prime Minister Ioannis Rallis, mother of Prime Minister Georgios Rallis
