= Antonios Komoutos =

Greek politician (1748–1833)

Count Antonios Komoutos
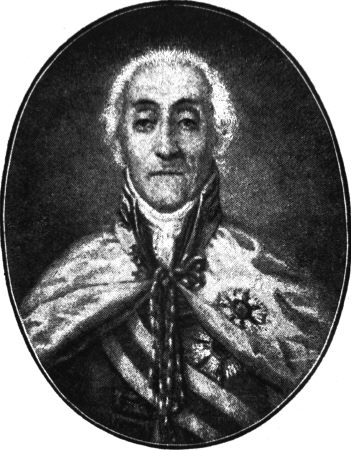
- Portrait of Komoutos in the Hemerologion of Skokos, 1896

Prince of the Septinsular Republic
- In office November 1803 – 1807
- Preceded by: Spyridon Georgios Theotokis

President of the Ionian Senate
- In office November 1803 – 1807
- Preceded by: Spyridon Georgios Theotokis

Personal details
- Born: 1748 Zakynthos, Venetian Ionian Islands
- Died: 1833 (aged 84–85) Zakynthos, United States of the Ionian Islands
- Children: Georgios Datsentos (adopted)
- Occupation: Politician, Scholar

Count Antonios Komoutos (Greek: Αντώνιος Κομούτος; 1748–1833) or Comoutos was a Greek scholar and politician. Born into a noble family from Zakynthos, he went on to serve as President of the Ionian Senate and Prince (head of state) of the Septinsular Republic starting from 1803 until the second French rule of the Ionian Islands in 1807.

== Biography ==
Antonios was born in 1748 in the Venetian-ruled Ionian island of Zakynthos (or Zante). He was a member of the noble Komoutos family which had a long history on the island. Tradition holds that early members of the family had settled in Zakynthos during the 15th century, following the fall of Constantinople and after they first sought refuge in Methoni and around the Peloponnese.

Spyridon Georgios Theotokis, president of the Senate and governor of the Septinsular Republic, died on 24 November 1803 and Antonios Komoutos was elected as the new president of the Senate and head of state "Prince". A constitutional committee was formed, which introduced a new constitution in December 1803, upon which Komoutos took his presidential oath. In 1807, the republic was ceded to Napoleon's French Empire heralding the second French rule in the Ionian Islands. The British gradually took control of the Ionian from 1809 onwards, and following the Treaty of Paris in 1815, the islands were formally organised into the United States of the Ionian Islands under British protection.

By 1815, Komoutos was heirless and adopted his son Georgios Komoutos (originally Datsentos), of humble origins, to whom he bestowed all his property. George Komoutos was later elected as a member of parliament in 1845 and died in 1865.

== Sources ==
- Lambros, Paul (1968). Coins and Medals of the Ionian Islands. Translated by Aloisius, Barozzi. B. R. Gruner Publishing. ISBN 978-90-6032-311-3.
- Mackridge, Peter (2014). "Introduction". In Anthony Hirst; Patrick Sammon (eds.). The Ionian Islands: Aspects of their History and Culture. Cambridge Scholars Publishing. pp. 1–23. ISBN 978-1-4438-6278-3.
- Moschonas, Nikolaos (1975). "Τα Ιόνια Νησιά κατά την περίοδο 1797–1821" [The Ionian Islands in the period 1797–1821]. In Christopoulos, Georgios A. & Bastias, Ioannis K. (eds.). Ιστορία του Ελληνικού Έθνους, Τόμος ΙΑ΄: Ο Ελληνισμός υπό ξένη κυριαρχία (περίοδος 1669 - 1821), Τουρκοκρατία - Λατινοκρατία [History of the Greek Nation, Volume XI: Hellenism under Foreign Rule (Period 1669 - 1821), Turkocracy – Latinocracy] (in Greek). Athens: Ekdotiki Athinon. pp. 382–402. ISBN 978-960-213-100-8.
- Karapidakis, Nikos (2003). "Τα Επτάνησα: Ευρωπαϊκοί ανταγωνισμοί μετά την πτώση της Βενετίας" [The Heptanese: European rivalries after the fall of Venice]. History of Modern Hellenism 1770–2000, Volume 1: Ottoman rule, 1770–1821 (in Greek). Athens: Ellinika Grammata. pp. 151–184. ISBN 960-406-540-8.
