= Greek Legion (Septinsular Republic) =

Infantry unit of the Septinsular Republic

- Греческий легион Πεζικὴ Λεγεὼν Ἐλαφρῶν Κυνηγετῶν
- Active: 1805–1807
- Country: Septinsular Republic
- Allegiance: Russian Empire
- Branch: Imperial Russian Army
- Type: Light infantry (Jäger)
- Size: 2,760 (1805); 4,019 (1807)
- Engagements: Napoleonic Wars: War of the Third Coalition; Anglo-Russian invasion of Naples; Russo-Turkish War (1806–1812); Second Archipelago Expedition

Commanders
- Notable commanders: Alexander von Benckendorff Emmanouil Papadopoulos

The Greek Legion (Russian: Греческий легион), officially the Light Jäger Foot Legion (Greek: Πεζικὴ Λεγεὼν Ἐλαφρῶν Κυνηγετῶν), was a Jäger infantry unit in the service of the Russian-controlled Septinsular Republic. It consisted of soldiers of Greek and Albanian origin and was led by Major-General Emmanouil Papadopoulos. It was active between 1805 and 1807, taking part in the War of the Third Coalition and the Russo-Turkish War (1806–1812).

== Background ==
Following the defeat of the French First Republic in the Mediterranean campaign of 1798, in 1800 Russia and the Ottoman Empire established joint sovereignty over the former French-ruled Ionian Islands in the form of the Septinsular Republic. From 1802 on, Russian troops were stationed in the islands to safeguard Russian interests.

In 1803, in the Epirote mainland across the islands, the war between the Souliote Albanians and the local semi independent Ottoman Albanian strongman Ali Pasha of Ioannina ended in defeat for the former and the occupation of their homeland. Initially relocating to Parga, the Souliote refugees were forced to cross the sea to the Septinsular Republic in March 1804, after Ali Pasha threatened to attack the city to rid it of the Souliotes. Approximately 3,000 Souliotes settled in the Ionian Islands, mostly in Corfu and Paxi, where they were provided with farmland. The warlike Souliotes struggled to fit in their new environment, stealing cattle and firewood from local residents and lamenting the loss of their homeland; according to the local historian Panagiotis Chiotis, their sole preoccupation was "cleaning their weapons, playing the guitar, and singing of heroic deeds in Albanian". Anxious to expand its influence to the Greek mainland, Russia signed alliances with Himariot and Cham Albanian beys on 27 June. Souliote refugees were mobilized for an offensive, which was cut short when Ali Pasha learned of the Russian plans and an Ottoman naval squadron made an unexpected appearance off Corfu.

== History ==
Apart from the Souliotes, the Septinsular Republic also became a haven for Greek klephts and armatoloi fleeing Ottoman rule in the rest of Greece. When French–Ottoman relations began to warm in, the Russian General Roman von Anrep began raising Greek expatriate military formations for the defense of the Ionian Islands. The sole request of the Greeks was to be allowed to serve in their traditional uniforms and use their accustomed military tactics of irregular warfare, rather than be dragooned into Western-style regular units. This was granted, and the Souliotes joined the ranks of their countrymen from the Morea (Peloponnese), Acarnania and Himara in forming Jäger units. The first recruits were 800 Souliots who formed the Souliot Legion in March 1805, the unit was commanded by Count Alexander von Benckendorff. Internecine warfare in Mani between pro-Russian and pro-French factions fueled the recruitment of Maniots into legion starting from October 1805.

The new corps was named Light Jäger Foot Legion (Greek: Πεζική Λεγεών Ελαφρών Κυνηγετών), 2,760 strong and divided into six regionally homogenous brigades of four hekatontarchies each. The brigades were named: Souliote, Epirote, Cheimarriote, Peloponnesian, Macedonian and Spartan Legions. In addition, the Legion comprised a small artillery detachment manned with Moreot volunteers. Each brigade had its own flag with a distinctive color, and featuring a cross with a crowned eagle in a laurel wreath in the center and the mottoes, taken from Isaiah 8:9–10, "God is with us" (ὁ Θεός μεθ' ἡμῶν) and "Huddle together, o nations, and be shattered" (γνῶτε ἔθνη καὶ ἡττᾶσθε). The legionaries wore their traditional dress, and took an oath to "serve the mighty Emperor of all the Russias and march against every enemy that the commander-in-chief of the Imperial Armies should command them to". The legion was initially commanded by Benckendorff, who was soon replaced by the Greek-born Major-General Emmanouil Papadopoulos. Among the hekatontarchs were such notable Souliote leaders as Kitsos Botsaris, Fotos Tzavelas and his brother Zygouris, the Zervas and Danglis brothers, Christoforos Perraivos, Anagnostis Papageorgiou, and even the son of the Bey of Mani, Pierros Grigorakis.

As part of the efforts to organize and train the Legion in modern warfare, in 1804 Papadopoulos published a military manual (Διδασκαλία στρατιωτική προς χρήσιν των Ελλήνων, "Military Teaching for the use of the Greeks"), followed the next year by the Legion's regulations (Ερμηνεία της συνισταμένης Λεγεώνος των Ηπειρωτο-Σουλιωτών και Χιμαρο-Πελοποννησίων, "Explanation of the combined Legion of Epirote-Souliots and Himariot-Peloponnesians"), where he exhorted its readers to remember that they are descendants of the ancient Greeks, to emulate the deeds of the celebrated Pyrrhus and Skanderbeg, and bring new glory to the Greek name.

In August 1805 the Greek Legion participated in the Anglo-Russian invasion of Naples, alongside 14,000 Russian and 10,000 British troops. The expedition was cut short, however, by Napoleon's decisive victory at the Battle of Austerlitz in December and changing allegiances of the Neapolitan government. On 7 January 1806, the Russians were forced to abandon the Italian mainland to the French. Fotos Tzavelas, Christos Kalogeros, and the future hero of the Greek Revolution, Nikitas Stamatelopoulos, particularly distinguished themselves during this campaign. During its time in Italy, the legion suffered heavy casualties from a malaria outbreak. An attempted merger of the Maniot-dominated Spartan Legion into the Peloponnesian one sparked a conflict between their commanders in April 1806. Papadopoulos intervened, separating the two units and making the Spartan Legion an independent formation. The same year, the Legion participated in operations in Dalmatia, where Papadopoulos commanded the Russian forces operating at the Bay of Kotor. On 19 September 1806, the legion captured Castel Nuovo after a seven-hour battle. During the unsuccessful Russian siege of Ragusa, the Legion confronted another Greek unit (augmented with Albanians and Slavs) in French service, the Chasseurs d'Orient under Nikolaos Papazoglou. The legion's participation in the Dalmatian operations has been disputed by some historians including Francis Carter and Foivos Oikonomou, since no mention of it has been made in Russian primary sources. Oikonomou claims that the Greeks serving in the Russian army in Dalmatia were in fact Orthodox Bosnians.

The Russo-Turkish War (1806–1812) broke out in December and the legion was brought back to the Ionian Islands, where it took part in the erection of new defense works. In March 1807, 400 members of the legion were transferred to Lefkada, while another 800 fighter detachment and the legion's artillery garrisoned Parga. On 22 March, the detachment stationed on Lefkada took part in a raid on Agia Mavra opposite the island; where Ali Pasha had massed troops, assisted by French artillery under Papazoglou. Although the raid was unsuccessful it curtailed Ali Pasha's plans to launch an offensive. During that time the unit reached its peak of 4,019 personnel. With the beginning of the Second Archipelago Expedition by Dmitry Senyavin, 270 members of the Legion embarked for the Dardanelles. During a landing attempt at Tenedos, hekatontarch Gogas Danglis was killed in action. The Russians captured Tenedos in March 1807, defeated the Ottomans off Athos and then repulsed two further Ottoman attacks on Tenedos. The legion's defense of Tenedos became the subject of a Greek folk song.

In the aftermath of the Peace of Tilsit, Russia returned the Septinsular Republic to France and the legion was disbanded on 30 August 1807. The majority of the legionnaires received recommendation letters from the Russian army and were recruited into the French Albanian Regiment under the condition of never fighting against Russia.

== Composition ==
In October 1805 the Legion included the following units. The Macedonian Legion (356 men) was broken down into smaller units and tasked with defending the Ionian islands while the rest of the legion (approximately 1964 men) took part in the invasion of Naples:

- Souliote Legion (four hekatontarchies) - commanded by Colonel Alexander von Benckendorff
- Epirote Legion (four hekatontarchies) - commanded by Major Chrestos Kalogeres-Tsames
- Cheimarriote Legion (two hekatontarchies) - commanded by Major Georgios Palatinos
- Peloponnesian Legion (one hekatontarchies) - commanded by Captain Anagnostaras Papageorgiou
- Macedonian Legion (four hekatontarchies)

== See also ==
- 1st Regiment Greek Light Infantry
- Greek Battalion of Balaklava
- Albanian Regiment (France)
