= Ionian gazeta =

Currency in the Ionian Islands, issued 1801

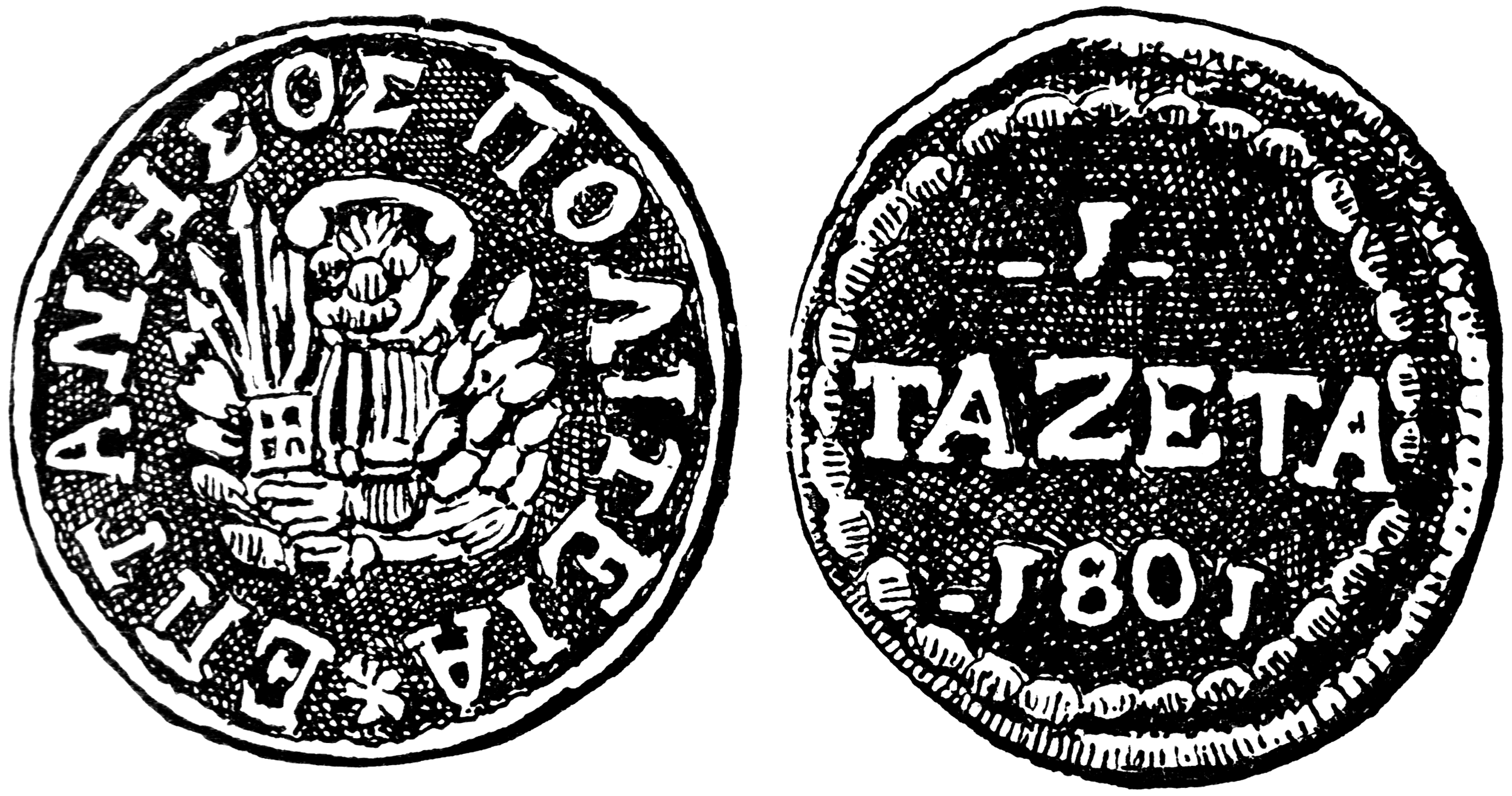
Illustration of a 1 gazeta coin, from the 1911 edition of the Century Dictionary (Lettering: ΕΠΤΑΝΗΣΟΣ ΠΟΛΙΤΕΙΑ = Septinsular Republic, ΓΑΖΕΤΑ = Gazeta

The gazeta (Greek: γαζέτα; plural γαζέτες, gazetes) was a currency issued in the Ionian Islands in 1801 during the Russo-Ottoman protectorate of the Septinsular Republic. It replaced the Venetian lira at a rate of 1 gazeta = 2 soldi, and continued to be used through the existence of the Septinsular Republic. After the British took possession of the islands, coins were countermarked in Turkish kuruş for use on the islands before the obol was introduced in 1819 for the United States of the Ionian Islands.
