= Emmanouil Papadopoulos (Russian general) =

Greek born Russian major general

- Born: Kea, Ottoman Empire
- Died: 11 June 1810; Shumla, Ottoman Empire
- Military career
- Allegiance: Russian Empire
- Service years: 1781 – 1810
- Rank: Major general
- Conflicts: Russo-Turkish War (1787–1792); War of the Third Coalition; Russo-Turkish War (1806–1812)

Emmanouil Papadopoulos (Greek: Εμμανουήλ Παπαδόπουλος, Russian: Эммануил Григорьевич Папандопуло, romanized: Emmanuil Grigorievich Papandopulo; died 11 June 1810) was a Greek officer in Imperial Russian service. Born on the Ottoman island of Kea, Papadopoulos chose to depart with the Russian troops who had briefly occupied it when he was a teenager.

He then pursued a military career, graduating from the Cadet Corps of Foreign Co-religionists. He fought in the Russo-Turkish War of 1787–1792, the War of the Third Coalition and the Russo-Turkish War of 1806–1812. He rose to the rank of major general before being killed in action on 11 June 1810.

== Life and career ==
Papadopoulos was born into a Greek family on the Aegean island of Kea, Ottoman Empire. Kea was among the islands occupied for several years by the Russians during the Russo-Turkish War of 1768–1774, before they were returned to Ottoman control in the Treaty of Küçük Kaynarca. Papadopoulos, who must have been around fifteen at the time, probably accompanied the departing Russians. He was educated in the Greek Gymnasium established by Grigory Potemkin and attached to the Cadet Corps of Foreign Co-religionists graduating as an engineer. In 1781 he entered the officer corps, later transferring to the infantry.

During the Russo-Turkish War of 1787–1792, he took part in the Siege of Ochakov (1788) and other battles against the Ottomans. For his distinguished actions near Koushan, he was promoted to the general staff. Upon the conclusion of peace with the Sublime Porte, Papadopoulos became a liaison officer in the Russian embassy in Constantinople where he served between 1793 and 1794. He also composed a description of the two major roads leading to the city.

He went on to command the Ladozhskii Musketeer Regiment. With the outbreak of the War of the Third Coalition in 1803, Papadopoulos formed a battalion and an artillery command with twelve guns from the garrison of Kamenets, with which he went to Corfu (part of the Russian-dominated Septinsular Republic). There, in 1804, he was engaged in organizing the Republic's regular army and the Greek Legion; the following year he also assumed command of the allied Greek troops on the Greek mainland. In the same year he was promoted to major general. In 1804, he also published in Corfu, in Greek and Italian, a military manual for the instruction of the Greeks in modern warfare (Διδασκαλία στρατιωτική προς χρήσιν των Ελλήνων, "Military Teaching for the use of the Greeks"). The manual facilitated the transition of the unit's organization from the previous Venetian model to the Russian one. In 1805, he published the Legion's regulations (Ερμηνεία της συνισταμένης Λεγεώνος των Ηπειρωτο-Σουλιωτών και Χιμαρο-Πελοποννησίων, "Explanation of the combined Legion of Epirote-Souliots and Himariot-Peloponnesians"), where he exhorted its readers to remember that they are descendants of the ancient Greeks, to emulate the deeds of the celebrated Pyrrhus and Skanderbeg, and bring new glory to the Greek name.

In autumn 1805 he led the troops of the Greek Legion to participate in the Anglo-Russian invasion of Naples, alongside 14,000 Russian and 10,000 British troops. The expedition was cut short, however, by Napoleon's decisive victory at the Battle of Austerlitz in December. In February 1806, the Anglo-Russians were forced to abandon the Italian mainland to the French. In 1806 he commanded the Russian forces operating at the Bay of Kotor. He particularly distinguished himself in the capture of Castelnuovo on 19 September 1806, after a seven-hour battle. In late 1806 he was named colonel-in-chief of the Kolyvansky Musketeer Regiment. Taking command of the regiment and all the Greek troops in the Ionian Islands, he successfully countered the threat of Ali Pasha of Ioannina. He established three legions at the mainland outpost of Parga in 1807, and organized the defences at Lefkada (Santa Maura), threatened by Ali Pasha with attack.

Following the Peace of Tilsit (1807), with his regiment he returned to Russia via Austria. He joined the Russian Army of the Danube during the Russo-Turkish War of 1806–1812, and distinguished himself again in several combats with the Turks, until his death in battle before Shumla on 11 June 1810. His epitaph was delivered by the Orthodox Metropolitan of Ungro-Wallachia, Ignatios II. It was published by the Greek scholar Periklis Zerlentis in 1887.

== Family ==
Papadopoulos had no sons, but his daughter Maria Emmanuilovna (died 1873) became a notable presence in Odessa for her numerous charitable works.

== Sources ==
- Kallivretakis, Leonidas (2003). "Ένοπλα Ελληνικά σώματα στη δίνη των Ναπολεοντείων πολέμων (1798-1815)" [Greek armed corps in the throes of the Napoleonic wars (1798-1815)]. Ιστορία του Νέου Ελληνισμού 1770-2000, Τόμος 1: Η Οθωμανική κυριαρχία, 1770-1821 [History of Modern Hellenism 1770-2000, Volume 1: Ottoman rule, 1770-1821] (in Greek). Athens: Ellinika Grammata. pp. 185–200. hdl:10442/8780. ISBN 960-406-540-8.
- Klokachev, P. (1902). "Папандопуло (Попандопуло), Эммануил Григорьевич". Русский биографический словарь (in Russian). Vol. 13. Saint Petersburg: I. N. Skorokhodov. p. 302.
- Pappas, Nicholas Charles (2021). "European Officers and the Mainland Irregular Forces on the Ionian Islands, 1798–1814: A Comparison of Command and Tactics" (PDF). Athens Journal of Mediterranean Studies. 7 (2): 119–142. doi:10.30958/ajms.7-2-3. ISSN 2407-9480.
- Zerlentis, Periklis (1887). "Ιγνατίου πρώην μεν Άρτης, είτα δε Ουγγροβλαχίας μητροπολίτου, Λόγος επιτάφιος εις τον στρατηγόν Εμμανουήλ Παπαδόπουλον". Παρνασσός (in Greek). 11: 201–206. Archived from the original on 2016-05-13.
