= Party of Radicals (Ionian Islands) =

Party of Radicals Κόμμα των Ριζοσπαστών
- Leader: Ilias Zervos Iakovatos, Iosif Momferatos
- Founded: 1848
- Ideology: Union of the Ionian Islands with Greece; Greek nationalism Constitutionalism; Radicalism; Liberal nationalism
- Political position: Left-wing

The flag of the United States of the Ionian Islands

The Party of Radicals (Greek: Κόμμα των Ριζοσπαστών), was a political party active in the United States of the Ionian Islands. It was founded in 1848 and dissolved immediately after the union of the Ionian Islands with the Kingdom of Greece in 1864. The political goals of the party were solely enosis (union) with Greece.

On 26 November 1850, the Radical MP John Detoratos Typaldos proposed in the Ionian parliament the resolution for the enosis of the Ionian Islands with Greece which was signed by Gerasimos Livadas, Nadalis Domeneginis, George Typaldos, Frangiskos Domeneginis, Ilias Zervos Iakovatos, Iosif Momferatos, Telemachus Paizis, Ioannis Typaldos, Aggelos Sigouros-Dessyllas, Christodoulos Tofanis. During the period of British rule, Prime Minister William Ewart Gladstone visited the islands and recommended their reunion with Greece, to the chagrin of the British government.

In 1862, the party split into two factions, the "United Radical Party" and the "Real Radical Party".
