= Antonios Maria Kapodistrias =

Greek diplomat (1741–1821)

Count Antonios Maria Kapodistrias
- Αντώνιος Μαρία Καποδίστριας
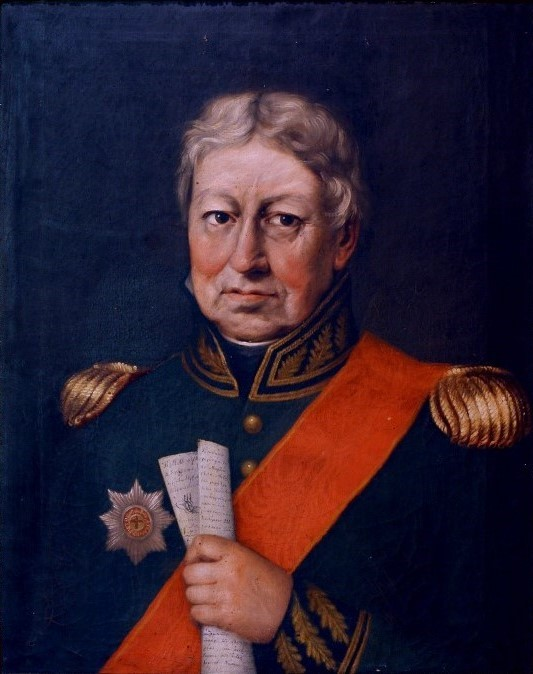
- Kapodistrias holding the establishment treaty of the Septinsular Republic, painting possibly by Gerasimos Pitsamanos.

Personal details
- Born: 22 April 1741 Corfu, Venetian Ionian Islands
- Died: 5 April 1821 (Note: While many sources place his death in the year 1819, his headstone mentions the year ,αωκα´, which in Greek numerals corresponds to 1821.) Corfu, United States of the Ionian Islands
- Spouse: Adamantia Gonemis
- Children: nine, including Viaros Kapodistrias, Ioannis Kapodistrias, Augustinos Kapodistrias

Count Antonios Maria Kapodistrias (Greek: Αντώνιος Μαρία Καποδίστριας; 1741–1821) or Capodistrias (also in Italian: Capo d'Istria) was a Greek politician, lawyer, and diplomat. Born into a noble family from Corfu, he held the title of Count of Capo d'Istria and became a member of the island's Great Council. Antonios was chosen as a representative of the island to the Ottoman Sublime Porte in 1799. He played a major role during the negotiations for the founding of the Septinsular Republic in 1800 as well as in the composition of the state's new constitution.

== Biography ==
Antonios Maria Kapodistrias was born in 1741 in Corfu, the most populous of the Ionian Islands, then under Venetian rule. He was descended from a distinguished noble family of counts that had a long and significant presence in the island's politics, economy, and social affairs. The Kapodistrias family was inscribed in the Libro d'Oro (Golden Book) of Corfiot nobility, which from the sixteenth century begun to include some Greek families, along with those of the Italian settlers. At his youth Antonios was educated by scholar and theologian Nikephoros Theotokis and later studied law in Padua, Italy. Antonios returned to Corfu and became active in the island's politics, joining the Great Council of Corfu in 1760.

Kapodistrias married the Corfiot noblewoman Adamantia Gonemis in the early 1770s and had their first son Viaros in 1774; they had in total nine children, four daughters and five sons. The Republic of Venice ruled the Ionian islands until its partition upon the Treaty of Campo Formio, when the islands briefly came under French control between 1797 and 1799. When Venice was overthrown, the island's nobles reacted to the abolition of their aristocratic privileges that was introduced by the French. As a result, Antonios Maria Kapodistrias, the leading representative of the Corfiot nobles, was arrested by the French and briefly imprisoned in 1798. He later settled with his family at their country home in Koukouritsa, located at the village of Evropouli in Corfu.

== Septinsular Republic ==
Following the capture of the islands by the allied Russian and Ottoman fleet in 1798, it was agreed that they would form an autonomous state that became known as the Septinsular Republic. Kapodistrias, accompanied by his son Augustinos, was one of the twelve delegates drawn from the noble classes of the Ionian Islands in 1799 that were to be sent to Saint Petersburg and Constantinople, in order to negotiate the status of the new state. In September 1799, Kapodistrias and the Zakynthian Count Nikolaos Gradenigos Sigouros Desyllas were chosen by the Sublime Porte as representatives during the negotiations in Constantinople. The independence of the new state was one of the main requests of the two delegates. The subsequent Treaty of Constantinople created the "Republic of the Seven United Islands" in 1800. Although its status as a semi-independent republic under Ottoman sovereignty was unpopular, it was nevertheless regarded as the first free Greek state to be established since the Fall of Constantinople in the 15th century. In December 1800, Kapodistrias and Sigouros Desyllas returned to Corfu from Constantinople having composed the new 'Byzantine Constitution', comprising 37 articles. As imperial commissioners, the two men were responsible for watching over the implementation of the constitution, a position which was soon held by Antonios Maria's son Ioannis Kapodistrias.

== See also ==
- Kapodistrias Museum
- Maria Desylla-Kapodistria

== Sources ==
- Dagkli, Eleni (2018). Septinsular Republic: The organization and the society under the constitution of 1803 (Thesis) (in Greek). Thessaloniki: University of Aristotle.
- Kakavakis, Vasileios (2021). "Antonio Maria Kapodistrias". Kerkyra simera (in Greek).
- Koukkou, Eleni (1983). Ιστορία των Επτανήσων από το 1797 μέχρι την Αγγλοκρατία [History of the Heptanese from 1797 until English rule] (in Greek). Εκδόσεις Δημ.Ν. Παπαδήμα.
- Mackridge, Peter (2014). "Introduction". In Anthony Hirst; Patrick Sammon (eds.). The Ionian Islands: Aspects of their History and Culture. Cambridge Scholars Publishing. pp. 1–23. ISBN 978-1-4438-6278-3.
- Montague-Woodhouse, Christopher (1973). Capodistria: the Founder of Greek Independence. Oxford University Press. ISBN 0192111965.
- Moschonas, Nikolaos (1975). "Τα Ιόνια Νησιά κατά την περίοδο 1797–1821" [The Ionian Islands in the period 1797–1821]. In Christopoulos, Georgios A. & Bastias, Ioannis K. (eds.). Ιστορία του Ελληνικού Έθνους [History of the Greek Nation] (in Greek). Vol. ΙΑ: Ο Ελληνισμός υπό ξένη κυριαρχία (περίοδος 1669 - 1821), Τουρκοκρατία - Λατινοκρατία [Hellenism under Foreign Rule (Period 1669 - 1821), Turkocracy – Latinocracy]. Athens: Ekdotiki Athinon. pp. 382–402. ISBN 978-960-213-100-8.
