= Septinsular Republic =

Ottoman and Russian protectorate in the southwest Balkans from 1800-07

Coordinates: 38°30′N 20°30′E

Republic of the Seven United Islands Ἑπτάνησος Πολιτεία (Greek) Repubblica Settinsulare (Italian)
- 1800–1807
- Emblem

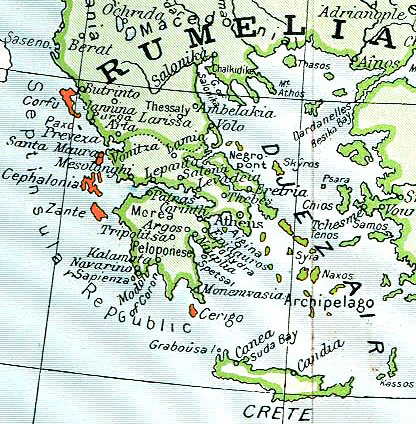
- The Republic's territory extended to the seven main islands plus the smaller islets of the Ionian Sea
- Status: Protectorate of the Russian and the Ottoman Empires^{1}
- Capital: Corfu
- Official languages: Greek; Italian
- Government: Federal oligarchic assembly-independent republic (de jure until 1806); Federal oligarchic directorial republic (de jure from 1806)
- Prince
  - 1800–1803: Count Spyridon Georgios Theotokis
  - 1803–1807: Count Antonios Komoutos
- Historical era: Early modern
  - Russo-Ottoman occupation: 1799
  - Established: 2 April [O.S. 21 March] 1800
  - 1st constitution: 1 November 1800
  - 2nd constitution: 23 November 1803
  - 3rd constitution: 27 December 1806 (not implemented)
  - Ceded to France: 20 August 1807
  - British Protectorate: 5 November 1815
- Currency: Septinsular gazeta
Preceded by	Succeeded by
First period of French rule in the Ionian Islands	Second period of French rule in the Ionian Islands
- Today part of: Greece
- 1. Formally under Ottoman suzerainty; under the de facto protection of the Russian Empire.; 2. According to the 1803 Constitution, the President of the Ionian Senate receives the title of the Prince (Principo, Πρίγκηψ) and is head of state.

The Septinsular Republic (Greek: Ἑπτάνησος Πολιτεία, romanized: Heptanēsos Politeia; Italian: Repubblica Settinsulare), also known as the Republic of the Seven United Islands, (Note: Greek: Πολιτεία τῶν Ἡνωμένων Ἑπτά Nήσων, Politeia tōn Hēnomenōn Hepta Nēsōn, Italian: Repubblica delle Sette Isole Unite) was an oligarchic republic that existed from 1800 to 1807 under nominal Russian and Ottoman sovereignty in the Ionian Islands (Corfu, Paxoi, Lefkada, Cephalonia, Ithaca, Zakynthos or Zante, and Kythira).

The Republic was established after a joint Russo-Ottoman fleet captured the islands and ended a two-year rule by the French Republic. Although the islanders had hoped for complete independence, the new state was granted only autonomy, becoming tributary to the Ottoman Porte, and de facto under Russian domination. Nevertheless, it was the first time that Greeks had been granted self-government since the fall of the last remnants of the Byzantine Empire to the Ottomans in the mid-15th century. In 1807, the republic was ceded to Napoleon's French Empire, but the islands kept their institutions of government. The British gradually took control of the islands from 1809 on, and following the Treaty of Paris, the islands were formally organised into the United States of the Ionian Islands under British protection.

== Background: French rule and Russian conquest of the Ionian Islands ==
The Ionian Islands (Corfu, Paxoi, Zakynthos or Zante, Kefalonia, Lefkada, Ithaca, and Kythira or Cerigo) along with a handful of exclaves on the Epirote mainland, namely the coastal towns of Parga, Preveza, Vonitsa, and Butrinto, had been Venetian possessions for centuries, thereby becoming the only part of the Greek world to escape conquest by the Ottoman Empire, developing a distinct local culture, and becoming a place of "dynamic interaction between the West and [...] the Greek East", indeed serving as "Greek culture's window on the West", through which Western European ideas and culture were transmitted to the Greek world.

Under Venetian rule, the population of the islands was divided into three classes: the privileged nobility, the urban middle class (cittadini) and the commoners (popolari). The nobility were mostly landowners, and derided mercantile activity, which was left to the urban commercial class; as a result, the latter also came to amass wealth and land, and aspired to join the ruling class. In this contest, the rural peasantry was generally politically marginalized. This medieval social order was upset after the fall of the Republic of Venice in 1797, when the islands came under French control. Shortly after, in the Treaty of Campo Formio, the islands were annexed to the French Republic and organized into three departments. The Republican French were welcomed by the populace, and the radical ideas of the French Revolution were implemented with the abolition of the local nobility, the equality of the social and religious communities (Orthodox, Catholic, and Jewish) and the installation of democratic regimes and local self-government on the islands. The French also created the islands' first public education system, and introduced the first printing press in what is now Greece.

Inevitably, the French presence was resented by the local aristocracy, now deprived of its privileges, while the heavy taxation and anti-clericalism of the French soon made them unpopular with broad sections of the common populace as well. Following the French invasion of Egypt furthermore, the French presence in the Ionian Islands aroused the opposition of the Ottomans and the Russian Empire, allied with the British, as part of the War of the Second Coalition. No less than the Patriarch of Constantinople, Gregory V, issued a proclamation to the Islanders denouncing the "ungodly" French, calling upon them to rise in revolt, and promising, on behalf of the Ottoman Porte, to allow the Islands to choose their own form of government. In autumn 1798, a joint Russo-Ottoman fleet evicted the French from the other islands and finally captured Corfu on 4 March [O.S. 21 February] 1799, while the autonomous Ottoman strongman Ali Pasha of Yanina took the opportunity to seize Butrinto, Preveza, and Vonitsa from the French.

== Establishment of the Septinsular Republic ==
=== Restoration of the nobility ===
In all the islands they occupied, the Russians at first installed provisional administrations of nobles and businesspeople alike. On 22 March, however, the Russian authorities invited assemblies of the nobles to undertake the governance of the Ionian Islands, thereby restoring the previous status quo. On the next day, the Great Council of Corfu was reconstituted; its very first action was a vote of thanks to the Allied rulers, the Ottoman Sultan, the Russian Emperor, and the British King. In Zakynthos, however, the local noble council preferred to direct its thanks exclusively to the British, an expression of the strong pro-British tendency on the island, due to the close commercial links centred on the currant trade.

On 6 May [O.S. 24 April] 1800, the commanders of the two fleets announced that the Ionian Islands would comprise a single state, governed by a Senate (Γερουσία) in Corfu city, composed of three representatives each from Corfu, Cephalonia, and Zakynthos, two from Lefkada, and one each from Ithaca, Kythira, and Paxoi. The Venetian nobleman Angelo Orio, the last Venetian provveditore of Argostoli, was appointed head of the Senate, and entrusted with the creation of a constitution for the new state. Orio's draft constitution comprised 28 articles and one addendum, and envisaged a thoroughly aristocratic regime, with each island headed by a Great Council composed of the nobles and the upper bourgeoisie. The Great Councils would elect the senators. Each island would retain a local administrative council of six members and a treasury, but a central treasury would exist in Corfu. The Senate was the ultimate executive authority, and its president the head of state. A Small Council of 40 would be elected by the Great Councils of the three largest islands, and would be responsible for justice, the selection of officials, and advising on legislation. Each island's council would have to ratify the laws passed by the Senate. In addition, the use of the Greek language was sanctioned for the first time in the courts. Ushakov also restored the Orthodox Archbishopric of Corfu, which had been abolished in the 13th century by the Angevin rulers of Corfu.

=== Treaty of Constantinople ===
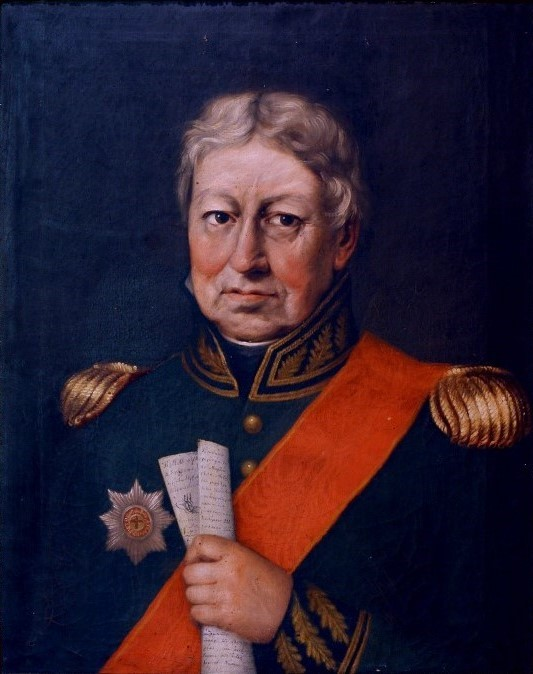
Antonios Maria Kapodistrias, one of the two main negotiators in Constantinople.

On 21 June 1799, the Senate sent a twelve-member delegation to Constantinople and Saint Petersburg, drawn from the upper classes of each island, to express its gratitude to the Sultan and Tsar and secure recognition of the new state's independence. The delegates were also tasked with producing a draft constitution and submitting it for ratification, as well as press for the restoration of the Islands' maritime and land frontier with the withdrawal of Ali Pasha from Butrinto, Preveza, and Vonitsa. The delegation included Orio, nominated as ambassador to St. Petersburg, and the presidency of the Senate passed to Count Spyridon Georgios Theotokis of the distinguished Theotokis family, who had previously headed the Provisional Municipality under French rule.

Once in Constantinople, however, the delegation quickly realized that the Porte was not interested in recognizing the Islands' independence, but rather in creating a vassal state under Ottoman suzerainty. Two of the delegates, the Corfiot Count Antonios Maria Kapodistrias and the Zakynthian Count Nikolaos Gradenigos Sigouros Desyllas, remained in Constantinople to conduct negotiations with the Porte, while Orio and another delegate, Kladas, were to represent the Ionian cause in Saint Petersburg. In the negotiations that followed, the Constantinople delegates were pitted against the Saint Petersburg ones in a correspondence war over the nature of the new polity.

On 6 April [O.S. 25 March] 1800, the Treaty of Constantinople was concluded between Russia and the Ottomans, joined later by the British, creating the "Republic of the Seven United Islands" (Greek: Πολιτεία τῶν Ἑνωμένων Ἑπτὰ Νήσων; Italian: Repubblica delle Sette Isole Unite), the first autonomous Greek state since the fall of the Byzantine Empire in 1453. According to the provisions of the treaty, the Ionian Islands would be a single federal state, with the individual islands preserving a degree of autonomy. It would follow the long-established model of the Republic of Ragusa, being an aristocratic republic led by the "primates and notables", and under Ottoman suzerainty, as token of which they would pay an annual tribute of 75,000 piastres to the Sultan. This was a victory for the Sultan, and a disappointment for the Islanders, who had been promised the right to choose their own form of governance in the proclamations of the Ecumenical Patriarch of Constantinople, Gregory V, and the head of the Russian fleet, Admiral Fyodor Ushakov. The new state's constitution, once agreed, would be approved by the signatory powers. As the new state lacked military forces, Russian and Ottoman forces would remain to garrison its forts and guarantee its security until the end of the war against France. The mainland exclaves of Parga, Vonitsa, Preveza, and Butrinto, on the other hand, would remain under Ottoman control but would enjoy a special status similar to that of the Danubian Principalities.

=== Adoption of the 'Byzantine Constitution' ===
At the same time, without consulting their colleagues in Saint Petersburg or the provisional government in the Islands, Capodistrias and Sigouros Desyllas also composed a new constitution and designed the new flag of the state. The new 'Byzantine Constitution' (Greek: Βυζαντινό σύνταγμα, Italian: constituzione bizantina) was most probably named after the city in which it was composed, Constantinople (ancient Byzantion)—although tradition derived the name from the Republic being the first free state in Greece since the fall of Constantinople. The constitution comprised 37 articles. It envisaged an aristocratic federal republic, with a local administration on every island, headed by three syndics, to be chosen annually from the Great Council of the nobles of each island. The syndics elected a dean (πρύτανις) as head of administration for four-month tenures. The Senate in Corfu remained the highest authority of the federal state, composed of the representatives of the islands. Its president, the archon, was the head of state. The constitution was printed in Greek, with heavy use of Italian loanwords for administrative terms, by the patriarchal press in Constantinople.

The new constitution was strongly reactionary, reversing the gains of the bourgeoisie in particular, in favour of the old noble families; even the titles of nobility granted in 1799, after the French left, and which were mostly given to the wealthy commercial class, were rescinded, and the legislation of the abolished Venetian Republic restored. In keeping with the reactionary ideas embodied in the constitution was also the new flag, sporting the Venetian Lion of Saint Mark holding a bundle of seven arrows, symbolizing the islands, and a Bible; suggestions with more revolutionary overtones, such as the rising phoenix, were rejected. On 1 November 1800, the new constitution and flag were formally sanctioned by the Grand Vizier and blessed by the Patriarch in Constantinople. The Ionian envoys to St. Petersburg, Orio and Kladas, protested to the Tsar about the events in Constantinople, but in vain; Theotokis, who now was recognized as head of state with the title of prince, even dismissed Orio from his position.

== Political turmoil and secessionist movements, 1800–1801 ==
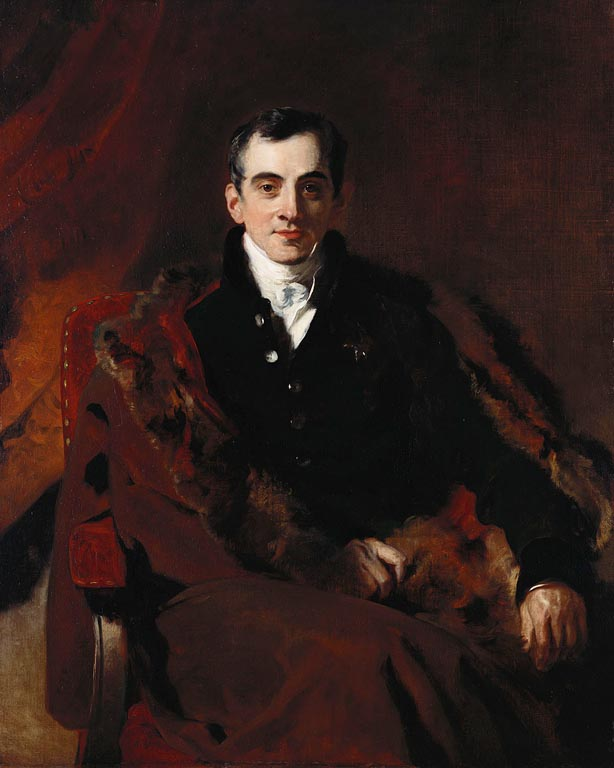
Ioannis Kapodistrias in 1818

On 26 December 1800, the two envoys to Constantinople arrived in Corfu as 'Imperial Commissioners', i.e., the Sultan's representatives in the islands, with the task of overseeing the implementation of the 'Byzantine Constitution'. On 13 January [O.S. 1 January] 1801, the flag of the Septinsular Republic was formally raised at Corfu.

The mission of the Imperial Commissioners—Antonio Maria Capo d'Istria was soon replaced by his son, Ioannis Kapodistrias, the future first governor of Greece—quickly proved problematic: the reactionary nature of the new constitution, which limited political power to the nobility, immediately made it controversial, as the common people had grown used to the greater civic rights and liberties enjoyed during the French Republican rule. To this were added local grievances and power struggles, which resulted in secessionist tendencies in some islands.

Already during the latter part of 1799, political tensions had led to the start of infighting, both among the nobility, as well as between the nobility and the other classes. While at Corfu, under the direct supervision of Ushakov, the elections of the new provisional authorities and their installation were orderly and peaceful, that was not the case in the other islands. Class and personal rivalries dominated the process there, and the arbitrary interventions of Ushakov's representative, Nikolai Tiesenhausen. In Zakynthos, for example, a plot was hatched to murder the nobles on 12 September 1799, the day the island's Great Council was to convene and elect the new government. While the plot was not carried out, its instigator, Antonio Martinengo, managed to bribe Tiesenhausen and secure an amnesty, whereas his co-conspirator Tsintos was shot. Due to the restiveness of the rural population, on 18 January 1800, the first repressive measures against the lower classes were announced.

=== Rebellions in Cephalonia ===
The mounting political passions came first to a head in Cephalonia, where the existence of a large middle class increased dissatisfaction with the reactionary local government. To this was joined the rivalry between the island's capital, Argostoli, and the town of Lixouri, and between the noble families of Metaxas and Anninos.

On 24 August 1800 an armed mob of civilians and rebel soldiers seized the government house in Argostoli, as well as ransacking and destroying the houses and villas of the administration members. A new government was formed on 9 September, but only after Count Konstantinos Chorafas was given plenipotentiary powers and a force of Russian troops, the unrest was suppressed. This peace did not last long, and a revolt under the nobleman Efstathios Metaxas broke out in May 1801. In response, the Imperial Commissioners came to the island to mediate in the conflict and established a 22-member Committee of Public Safety, with themselves and Colonel Nikolaos Pierris as chairmen. In the end Metaxas' revolt was subdued by a compromise reached by Ioannis Kapodistrias: the previous government of the island resigned on 20 May, and the Commissioners along with the Committee of Public Safety took over the island's governance, with the aim of pacifying the island and disarming the inhabitants.

Local passions hindered their work, however: in late May, the delegation of Lixouri withdrew from the committee and the Lixouriotes made threatening moves against Argostoli, forcing the Imperial Commissioners to visit Lixouri in person to calm matters. At the same time, the brothers Andreas and Kaisar Metaxas refused to acknowledge the Committee of Public Safety and rose in revolt, which was only suppressed after heavy combats on 15 June: Andreas surrendered, but Kaisar fled to Corfu. In the meantime, Lixouri had voted for secession from the Argostoli-based government, and sent envoys to Corfu demanding a separate administration for the town; at the same time, the dissatisfied peasants of Anogi also rebelled and began attacking Lixouri, until troops sent by the Committee of Public Safety clashed with them and drove them back.

In order to restore order, the Imperial Commissioners convened the island's Great Council on 20 July, which according to the constitution elected the three syndics, the three senators-representatives and the other public officials. In all cases, the offices were equally apportioned among representatives of the island's three towns, Argostoli, Lixouri, and St. George's Castle. After this was done, on 27 July the Imperial Commissioners felt able to proclaim the successful establishment of lawful government on the island. This proved premature, for in August, the peasantry around Lixouri rebelled, seized the town, and expelled the government garrison. Kapodistrias and Andreas Panas tried to mediate a settlement, but the rebels, backed by the local Austrian vice-consul, refused.

=== Secessionist movements in Zakynthos and Ithaca ===
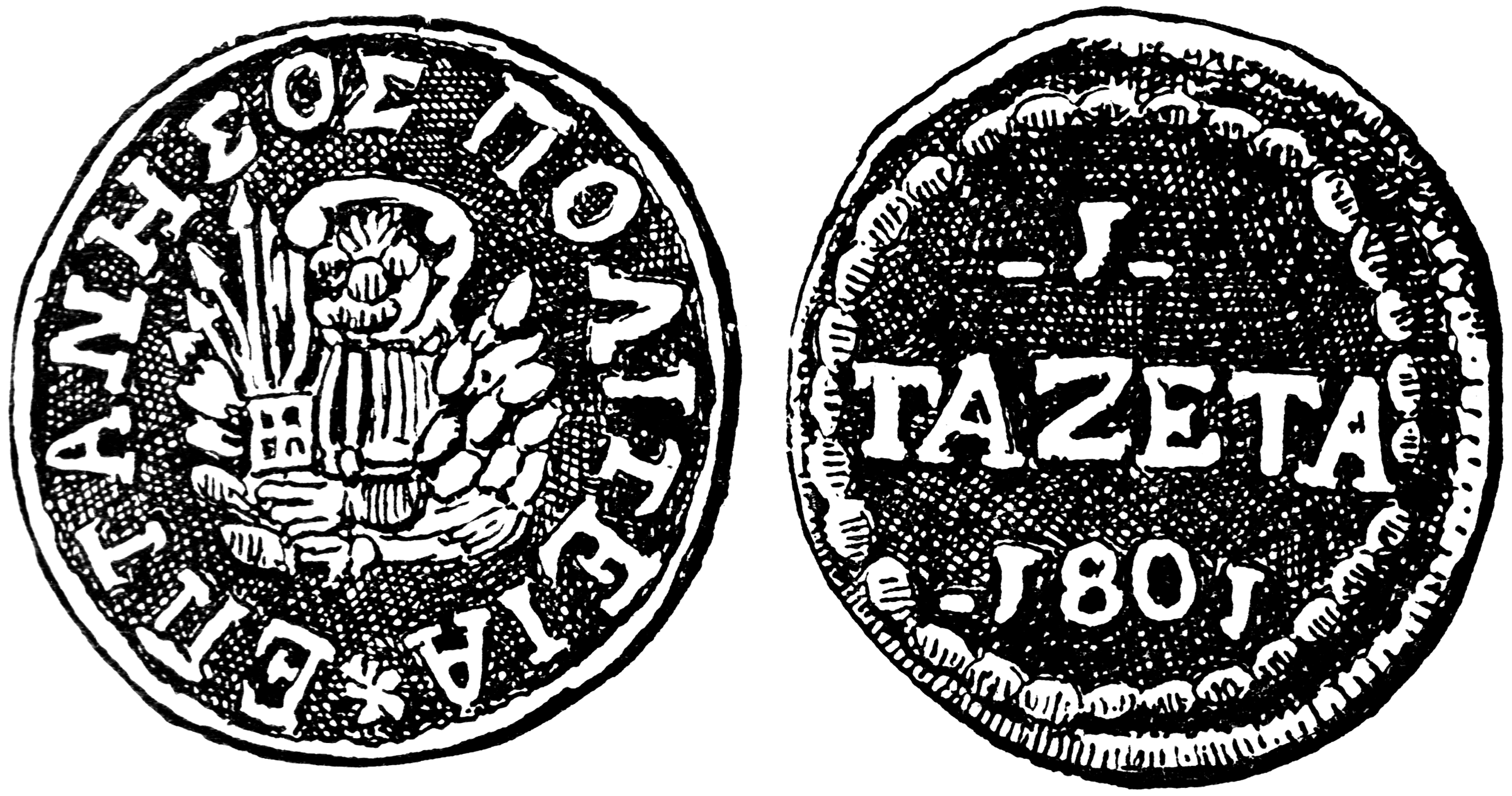
One-gazeta coin of the Septinsular Republic

Similar unrest also broke out in Kythira, where rioting peasants attacked the nobles and merchants before troops restored order, and in Lefkada.

On Zakynthos, the turmoil continued, with constant clashes between rival groups and coalitions. While the central government planned a coup, another, pro-British coup broke out first. On 20 February 1801, Zakynthos seceded from the Republic, raising the British flag instead, apparently with the support of a supposed British colonel, a certain James Kallender, who happened to be on the island and became its military governor. The initiative was quickly denounced by the British ambassador to the Porte, the Earl of Elgin, but constitutional order was not restored until five Ottoman vessels and a British warship arrived before the island on 12 September 1801.

A similar secessionist movement also briefly took hold of Ithaca, where the local government entertained contacts with Zakynthos. When the Imperial Commissioners arrived on 18 August on the island with the intention of installing a constitutionally-based administration, the local government resigned. Pro-British sentiments were limited to the capital of Vathy, however, while the rural population supported the Commissioners' efforts.

=== Departure of the Russo–Ottoman troops and the "Honourable Deputation" ===
Even Corfu was not spared unrest: on 8 June [O.S. 27 May] 1801, bloody riots broke out due to the arrogant behaviour of armed Ottoman soldiers in the city. With its own troops unable to contain the situation—most of the available forces had been shipped to Cephalonia—the Senate handed over authority to the Russians, under Lt. Colonel Karl Hastfert, so as to prevent a general massacre and restore order. The Russian intervention calmed the situation, but the Senate requested that the Ottomans remove their troops from the island. Conversely, when the Russians announced their intention of removing their own troops, the Senate president Theotokis implored the Russian to remain and ensure the islands' domestic tranquility and external security. Nevertheless, on 25 August 1801, the occupying powers officially handed over control of the fortresses and departed.

This act seriously undermined the stability of the government, whose repressive measures only alienated the middle class and peasantry further. By this time, the city of Corfu was virtually under siege by the rural population, which ransacked the nobility's country estates. While the Senate became increasingly powerless, power increasingly shifted to a group of the commercial class (Spyridon Delviniotis, Karolos Manesis, and Alexandros Avgoustos Kogevinas) who maintained contacts with the peasantry.

To counter the restiveness of the populace, and the increasing demands for civic rights, the Senate gave Theotokis dictatorial powers. Theotokis formed an 'Extraordinary Committee of Public Safety' (Commissione Estraordinaria di Pubblica Sicurezza) composed of Dimitrios Armenos, Stamos Chalikiopoulos, and Ioannis Kapadokas, but the rebellious lower classes refused to accept its authority. Instead the middle class and peasants elected their own delegates, resulting in the formation of a body of 64 men, the 'Honourable Deputation of the City, Boroughs, and Villages of Corfu' (Onoranda Deputazione della città, borghi e ville di Corfù), which declared the 1800 constitution as void, and began drafting a new, more democratic constitution.

The constitution proposed by the 'Honourable Deputation' vested sovereign power in Corfu in a 240-member council of 'Best Ones', elected for life in general, albeit indirect, suffrage. 100 members would come from the city, with 40 noblemen, 40 entrepreneurs, 14 merchants, and 6 artisans; the rest of the members would come from the countryside. Executive power was vested in a committee of four procuratori, who were elected from among the 'Best Ones' and chaired its proceedings. The council decided on all matters, and also elected the three representatives of the island to the Ionian Senate, which was intended to retain its original functions. The definition of nobility, and with it suffrage, was broadened to all those who had an income of 1,000 thalers, regardless of residence or profession.

Events proceeded quickly: the draft constitution was sent to the Senate on 21 October 1801, and ten days later, the 'Honourable Deputation' demanded from Theotokis to appoint representatives of the nobility to form a common provisional government for Corfu. In a highly symbolic display of unity and class reconciliation, on 28 November the 'Honourable Deputation' joined with 14 representatives of the "so-called nobility", as they were termed, to take over power; on the next day, the nobles signed the new constitution.

== Foreign intervention and the oligarchic constitution of 1803 ==
The new regime of Corfu was not welcome to the Allied powers of the Second Coalition, nor to the noble-dominated Senate: in early March 1802, on the invitation of Theotokis, a British force landed on Corfu and joined with the troops of the Republic. The Ottomans also disapproved of events, although they recognized the necessity of reforms to the original constitution. The Porte charged Theotokis, who remained president of the Senate, to restore the previous status quo, until proper deliberations involving the Allied powers, the Imperial Commissioners, and the islanders could take place. The rural population was on the point of marching on Corfu city, but the warnings of the Ottomans to the 'Honourable Deputation', and the French consul, Romieu, who addressed the peasants, temporarily calmed matters.

With the situation still volatile, the Russians secured the agreement of the other Great Powers to send their own troops to the islands, with the Zakynthian count Giorgio Mocenigo, a former Russian ambassador to Florence and briefly the Septinsular Republic's envoy to St. Petersburg, as the Tsar's plenipotentiary. In the meantime, the Treaty of Amiens led to the formal recognition of the Republic, as constituted in the Treaty of Constantinople, by France, Spain, the United Kingdom, and the Batavian Republic.

=== Arrival and reforms of Giorgio Mocenigo ===
Mocenigo arrived at Corfu on 1 September 1802, with five Russian vessels and 1,600 troops. In the meantime, the proposals of the 'Honourable Deputation' had been rejected, and only the presence of the British troops kept its supporters out of Corfu city.

In this atmosphere, Mocenigo's arrival was welcomed by both sides: the nobles felt that he would support their authority, while the lower classes hoped that he would liberate them from it. Indeed, Mocenigo immediately began to reform the institutions of the Republic, by limiting the power of the nobles as well as the autonomy of the individual islands. Mocenigo established a new provisional government or 'regency' (reggenza) in each island, where executive power was concentrated in the hands of a regent (reggente), who in all cases had to come from a different island, but was assisted by two deputies chosen by him from the island's population. While Theotokis, who was able to work well with Mocenigo, remained as President of the Senate (and thus titulary head of state), the existing Senate was dissolved on 30 December 1802, and a provisional Senate appointed by Mocenigo, to general dissatisfaction. The new regime was quick to stamp out any sign of dissent or rebellion, and pro-French sentiment was frowned upon, particularly after the positive reception of a speech by the French general Sebastiani at Zakynthos.

On 3 February 1803, the provisional Senate announced the creation of new electoral colleges, the so-called sincliti, replacing the old councils of the nobility. Nevertheless, membership to these was restricted by a series of property, citizenship, religious, and professional qualifications, so that they had a pronounced oligarchic character. These sinliti in turn elected a 40-member legislative body (Corpo Legislativo), with ten members each from Corfu, Cephalonia, and Zakynthos, four from Lefkada, two each from Ithaca and Kythira and one from Paxoi) and a seventeen-member Senate (with four members each from Corfu, Cephalonia, and Zakynthos, two from Lefkada, and one each from the other islands). The new Senate appointed Ioannis Kapodistrias as Secretary of State.

=== Constitution of 1803 ===
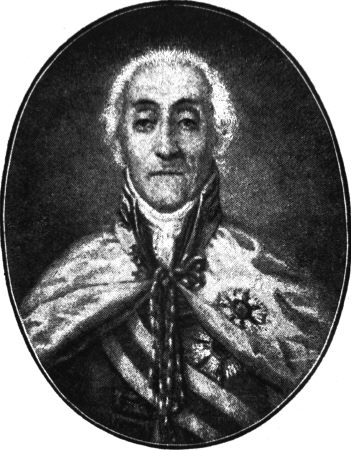
Antonios Komoutos, President of the Ionian Senate and head of state of the Septinsular Republic in 1803

On 26 October, the Constitutional Assembly convened, which on 5 December 1803 passed the new constitution of the Republic. Its 212 articles were a mixture of progressive principles and restrictions on political rights that ensured the oligarchic nature of the state. While the Venetian-era hereditary nobility was abolished, a new civic aristocracy ('constitutional nobility') took its place. Based on property or academic qualifications, it was composed of many former nobles as well as businesspeople. This new aristocracy formed the electorate for the sincliti, which continued to elect the Senate and the legislative body as before.

The Constitution of 1803 introduced the principle of separation of powers, and instituted a new body, the censors (censori) who were to safeguard compliance to the Constitution and function as advisors to the Senate. The Senate remained the main executive body, with three branches for foreign affairs, interior and finance affairs, and military affairs. Each island retained its own government for the time being, headed by a dean or rector (pritano), while his two deputies were now named regents (eggenti). Among the progressive elements of the new constitution were the institution of juries, personal liberties, the inviolability of a citizen's home, and religious tolerance. The constitution also contained a clause (Article 211) that made knowledge of the Greek language mandatory for any candidate for public office after 1810, while from 1820 on all public documents were to be exclusively in Greek.

The new constitution went into force on 27 December, when the Metropolitan of Corfu blessed it and the president of the Constitutional Assembly and deputy president of the Senate took their oaths on it. With Theotokis having died on 24 November, a new president of the Senate and head of state of the Republic was elected; Antonios Komoutos from Zakynthos. The following period saw a flurry of legislative and administrative activity: between January and March 1804, laws concerning local administration, shipping, rural communes, and education were passed, the ecclesiastical administration was reformed, and the ministries were established. The Republic now became truly a proper state, and aroused the expectations and hopes of the Greek intelligentsia: Adamantios Korais and Eugenios Voulgaris dedicated their works to the Republic.

Nevertheless, due to the machinations of Mocenigo, the Russians never ratified the new constitution. Furthermore, as the Russian plenipotentiary, Mocenigo was the most influential person in the state, with a decisive voice in all matters, and soon began to undermine the constitution by creating extraordinary committees, bypassing the ordinary courts, and establishing a 'Sublime Police', staffed by his own nominees and controlled by him.

== Relations with Ali Pasha, the Souliots, and the creation of the Greek Legion ==
Relations between the Republic and its neighbour Ali Pasha were tense and complicated. The Ionian Islands, and especially Lefkada, were a common refuge for klephts and brigands fleeing the Ottoman authorities of the Greek mainland. With the Islands as a secure base, they often launched raids on the Turkish-held shores. In turn, Ali Pasha harassed the Republic's citizens, and imposed heavy tolls on its vessels in the harbours he controlled.

During this period, Ali Pasha in a series of campaigns suppressed the rebellious Souliots, who defied his authority. Advised by the turncoat Georgios Botsaris, Ali pursued a strategy of encircling the area of Souli with forts and besieging it. Already in 1800, the Souliots wrote to Theotokis for aid against the designs of Ali Pasha. The latter in turn threatened the inhabitants of Parga, to prevent them from lending any aid to the Souliots. By 1803, the position of the Souliots had grown dire, and they implored the Septinsular Republic for ammunition. A Souliot embassy visited Mocenigo, conveying an appeal to Tsar Alexander. Mocenigo gave them some ammunition, but secretly from the Russians; this and later requests for Russian mediation remained unanswered, even as Ali Pasha, with the Sultan's backing, moved to eradicate the last centres of Souliot resistance. The Souliots who managed to escape from Ali's forces made for Parga, but they were forced to cross the sea to the Septinsular Republic in March 1804, after Ali Pasha threatened to attack the city. In November 1803, the Republic signed a treaty with Ali Pasha, who was represented by the Metropolitan of Nafpaktos Ignatios.

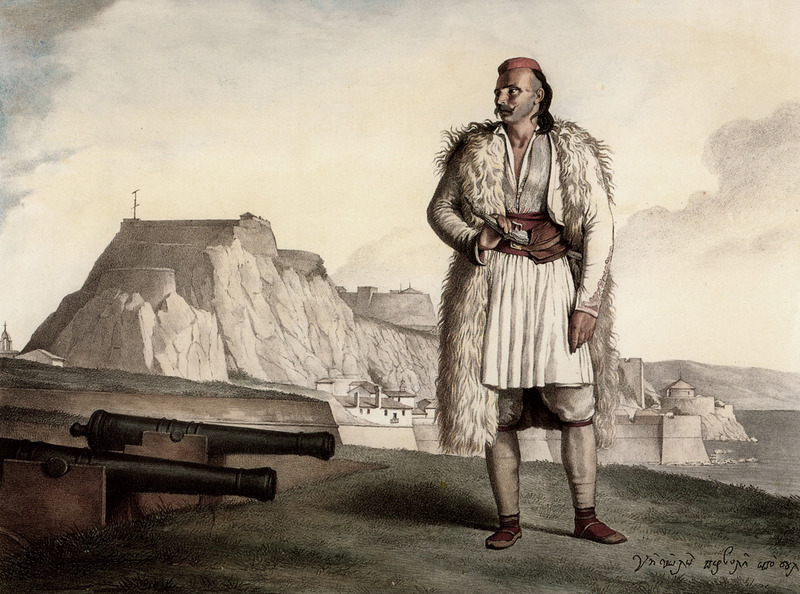
A Souliote warrior in Corfu, with the Old Fortress in the background

Approximately 3,000 Souliotes settled in the Ionian Islands, mostly in Corfu and Paxoi, where they were provided with farmland. The warlike Souliotes struggled to fit in their new environment, stealing cattle and firewood from local residents and lamenting the loss of their homeland. Anxious to expand its influence to the Greek mainland, Russia signed alliances with Himariot and Cham Albanian beys on 27 June 1804. Souliot refugees were mobilized for an offensive, which was cut short when Ali Pasha learned of the Russian plans and an Ottoman naval squadron made an unexpected appearance off Corfu.

As French–Ottoman relations began to warm in 1805, the Russians began raising native military formations for the defence of the Ionian Islands, enrolling Souliots, Himariots, Acarnanians, and Moreots into the so-called 'Greek Legion', which was placed under the command of the Greek-born Major General Emmanouil Papadopoulos. In autumn 1805 the Greek Legion participated in the Anglo-Russian invasion of Naples, and in 1806 it fought against the French at the Bay of Kotor.

== "Russian" Constitution of 1806 ==
Mocenigo's influence became decisive in the run-up to the revision of the 1803 constitution, scheduled for 1806. On Mocenigo's suggestion, the Senate instituted a 'Decemvirate' (Δεκανδρία) to study the changes to the constitution; in the end, the council's suggestions reflected Mocenigo's designs. When the sincliti were convened to elect their representatives to the Constitutional Assembly on 13 September 1806, they turned into a sham: Mocenigo sent an envoy to every island with prepared lists of the representatives to be elected. Finally, when the Constitutional Assembly convened on 27 October, Mocenigo simply replaced the entire Legislative Council, which was to prepare the lists of the candidates for public office, with his own choices, and appointed Ioannis Kapodistrias as its secretary and rapporteur. Kapodistrias presented the draft constitution to the Constitutional Assembly on 22 December. These moves aroused considerable opposition, but Kapodistrias successfully argued that there was no alternative that would enjoy the consent of St. Petersburg, and the new constitution was approved five days later.

The new constitution vested sovereignty in the so-called 'active nobility', determined by income and academic titles. This restriction actually resulted in the exclusion of some of the old noble families, that had become impoverished in the meantime. A Legislative Senate of 17 members (four each for Corfu, Cephalonia, and Zakynthos, two for Lefkada, and one each for the minor islands), of whom nine served for three years and eight for four, was given legislative authority, while executive authority was vested in a five-member college, the principato. The members, known as the 'heads of the republic' (capi della repubblica), came one each from the three major islands of Corfu, Cephalonia, and Zakynthos, while the fourth came either from the three islands or from Lefkada, and the fifth either from Lefkada or from the minor islands. The principato had a rotating presidency, with a tenure of one year; for that year, the president was also the head of state and prince of the Republic. The principato further appointed the four ministers: for foreign affairs, war and naval affairs, interior affairs, finances and justice. The local governments of the islands were not changed, but the constitution of 1806 abolished many of the more progressive and liberal clauses of its predecessor. Above all, it effectively abolished the Republic's autonomy by recognizing the right of Russia to intervene in its domestic and foreign affairs.

It is still debated among historians whether the revisions incorporated in the 1806 constitution reflected an initiative of the Russian government, or whether it was driven by a small coterie of men around Mocenigo, aiming to concentrate power in fewer hands. Nevertheless, the 'Russian Constitution', as it soon became known, strongly reinforced the position of Russia and the pro-Russian elements in the Republic, arousing the suspicions of France.

== Russo-Turkish War and the end of the Republic ==
In the meantime, the shifting alliances in Europe impacted the Republic as well, with Ottoman Turkey drifting away from Russia, and towards France. On 6 January 1807, the Ottoman Porte notified the Republic of the declaration of war with Russia. As de jure the Republic was an Ottoman vassal, the Porte demanded the Ionian Islands' adherence to the Ottoman camp against Russia. France followed by recalling its envoy and terminating its diplomatic relations with the Republic. Under Mocenigo's tutelage, the Ionian Senate on 17 June 1807 declared the end of the Republic's neutrality towards France, effectively bringing the islands into the War of the Fourth Coalition on the side of Russia.

This situation was exploited by Ali Pasha, whose ambition to occupy the Ionian Islands was well known and had received Napoleon's backing, as the Republic was now in the Russian orbit. In spring, Ali's forces attacked Lefkada. The reinforcement of the island with Russian and Souliot troops, and the failure of Ali's troops to capture the Castle of Santa Maura, led to the attack being broken off. Nevertheless, on 2 June the Senate resolved the establishment of an 'Ionian Encampment' (Campo Jonio) on Lefkada, comprising the Republic's regular forces as well as all the island militias. At the same time, a fortification programme was begun, and Ioannis Kapodistrias was named Commissioner Extraordinary to oversee it. The defence of Lefkada soon attracted widespread support, and even klepht captains from the mainland rushed to join it, including Katsantonis, Kitsos Botsaris, Dimitrios Karaiskos, Georgios Varnakiotis, and most notably, Theodoros Kolokotronis. It was there that Kapodistrias first came into contact with some of the chief military leaders of the subsequent Greek War of Independence.

Ultimately, the fate of the Septinsular Republic would be decided in the battlefields and chanceries of Europe: in the Treaty of Tilsit in July, the Ionian Islands were ceded once again to Napoleonic France. On 20 August, French troops landed on Corfu, followed three days later by General César Berthier, who received control of the islands from the Russian admiral Dmitry Senyavin. As the Russians departed, French troops replaced them in all islands, as well as the mainland dependency of Parga. Finally, on 1 September, contrary to his instructions to preserve the Islands' constitution, Berthier as Governor-General declared the annexation of the Septinsular Republic to France.

== Aftermath: Second French rule and British conquest ==
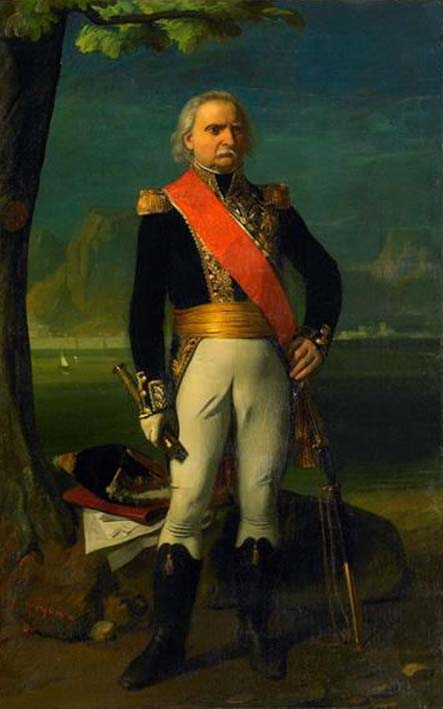
General François-Xavier Donzelot, second French Governor-General of the Ionian Islands (1808–1814)

Berthier moved swiftly to abolish the Republic's attributes as an independent state: the French flag was hoisted, all public officials and soldiers took an oath of allegiance to Napoleon, the embassies and agencies of the Republic abroad were abolished, and all domestic bodies apart from the courts and the Senate as well. These measures annoyed Napoleon, who replaced Berthier as Governor-General with François-Xavier Donzelot. His chief task, according to the instructions sent by Napoleon, was to defend the islands, and above all Corfu, against the mounting British threat. In November 1807, Napoleon regulated the administration of the new French possessions: the internal structure of the Republic was retained largely along the lines of the 1803 Constitution, including the Ionian Senate (although its members were now appointed rather than elected), but the administration was overseen by a Governor-General and an Imperial Commissioner, with Julien Bessières the first to occupy the latter post.

The British had reacted to the French takeover of the islands by a naval blockade, which impeded both trade and the supply of the islands. The resulting hardships, and the activities of British agents, inflamed anti-French sentiments, and some Ionian captains petitioned the British commander-in-chief in the Mediterranean, John Stuart, for aid in expelling the French from the islands. Indeed, in October 1809 a British expeditionary force under Brigadier John Oswald arrived at Zakynthos, and issued a proclamation promising to restore the Ionian Islands' liberty and independence. Due to the small size of the French garrisons, the British quickly occupied Zakynthos and Cephalonia (4 October), Ithaca (8 October), and Kythira (12 October), installing provisional administrations according to the existing laws.

The first major military operation was against Lefkada, in April 1810, where Greek auxiliaries under Theodoros Kolokotronis and the British major Richard Church played a particularly important role. Despite strong French resistance, the garrison surrendered on 16 April. On 29 May 1810, on the Paxoi islands a pro-British uprising broke out. The rebels evicted the small French garrison, raised the British flag, and attacked French sympathizers on the islands. However, British troops failed to arrive, and the French in Corfu quickly suppressed the uprising. The British established a Governor-General in Zakynthos (General Oswald until 1810, General George Airey until 1813, and General Sir James Campbell after). Each island was governed by a Governor with a five-member Executive Council, and a local legislative assembly, the Administrative Body. While the British-controlled islands returned to normality, the French-held islands of Corfu and Paxoi, under Donzelot and Imperial Commissioner Mathieu de Lesseps, suffered from the effects of the British blockade, which became official on 10 November 1810.

Finally, Paxoi were occupied by the British in early 1813, followed by Parga on 22 March 1814, after a popular uprising evicted the French. Corfu held out until the first downfall of Napoleon and the restoration of Louis XVIII: The armistice of 23 April [O.S. 11 April] 1814 obliged the French to evacuate Corfu. In June, Donzelot surrendered the island to Campbell. The Ionian Senate, declaring that the Republic had been suspended but not abolished under the French and British occupation, tried to advocate for the independence of the Islands in the Congress of Vienna, but Campbell refused to accept this view, holding that the Republic had ceased to exist after Tilsit, and regarding the appointed Senate as not representative of the Ionian people. In the end, the Ionian Islands were formed into a British protectorate, the "United States of the Ionian Islands", which existed until the islands were united with the Kingdom of Greece in 1864.

== Languages ==
Due to the long Venetian rule, the Ionian Islands were linguistically and culturally influenced by Italy. During the Venetian period, Italian was used for official purposes in the islands but it was also widely spoken by the upper classes, who were often educated in Italian universities, whereas the vast majority of the population were monolingual Greek-speakers. The only island in which Italian (Venetian) had a wider spread was Cefalonia, where a greater number of people had adopted Venetian as their first language. Italian culture and language retained a dominant status among the educated urban elites well into the 19th century—Italian remained an official language until 1851—but the lower classes remained "monolingually and monoculturally Greek".

The official language was at first the Italian language and then in 1803 Greek became, along with Italian, one of the two official languages of the Republic, with the intention of replacing Italian altogether by 1820. The 1800 constitution of the Septinsular Republic was printed in Greek by the patriarchal press in Constantinople, using many loanwords from Italian for technical terms. However, the new constitution approved in 1803 was drafted in Italian. The text of the constitution was prefaced by the report of the committee that drafted it, which stated that: "the noble, rich and harmonious Hellenic dialect, having been exiled by the Venetians, should be recalled to the dominion and become the language of administration and the interpreter of the active citizens". However, due to the French occupation after 1807, this was not enacted at the time. It was not until 1852 that Greek became the sole official language of the Ionian Islands.

== Religion ==
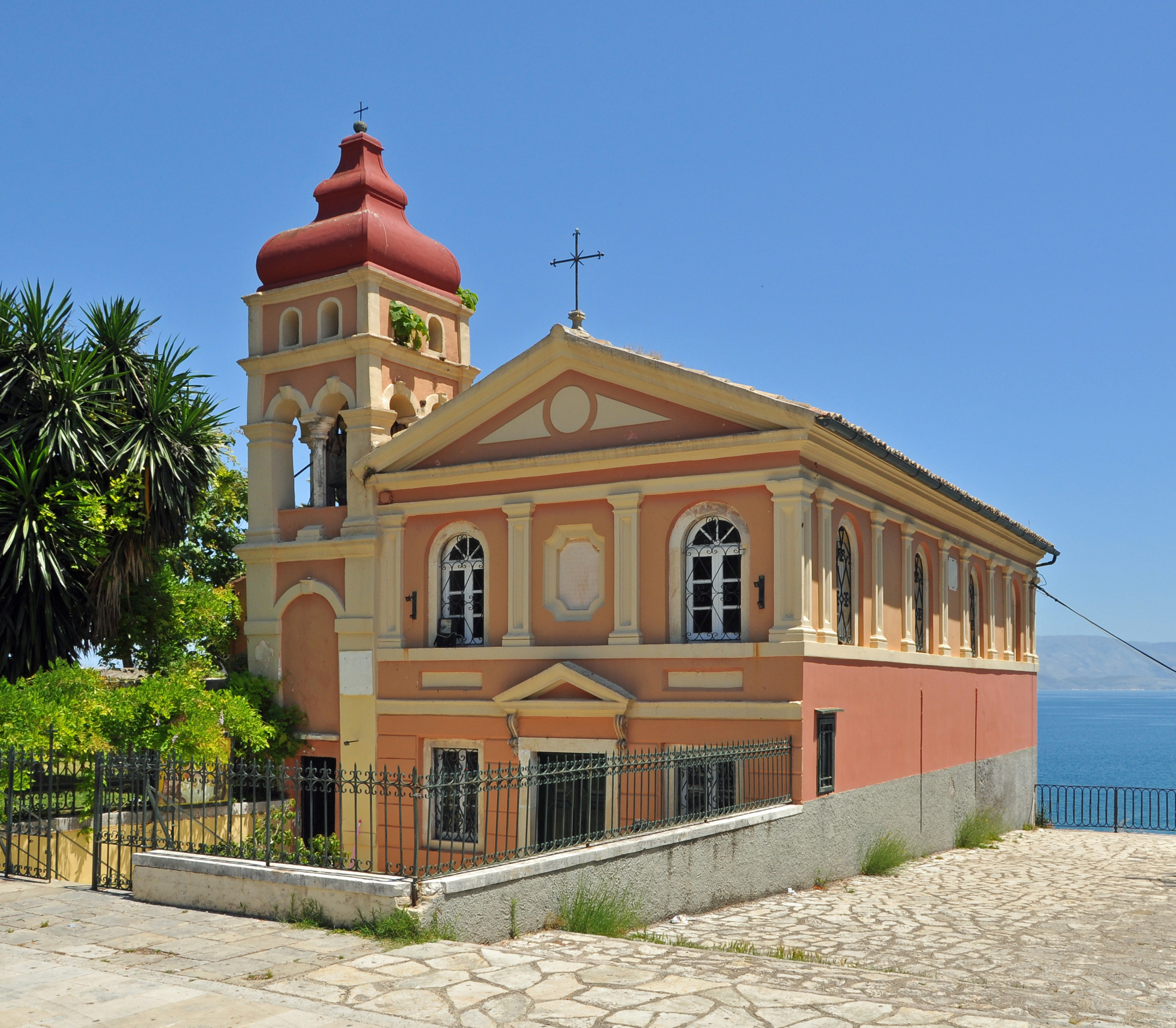
The Church of Panagia Mandrakina in Corfu town

Most of the people on these islands during this period were Christians, with a small number of Jews on Corfu, Zante and an even smaller number on Cefalonia. The majority of Christians were Eastern Orthodox. However, there was a significant number of Catholics, especially on Corfu, Zante and Cefalonia. The Constitution of 1803 recognized Orthodoxy as the dominant faith; it also stated that the Roman Catholic faith was recognized and protected. The Constitution also provided for the enactment of a law defining the privileges of the Jews residing in the State.

== See also ==
- List of Greek countries and regions
- Corfiot Italians
- Republic of Venice
- United States of the Ionian Islands

== Sources ==
- Gekas, Sakis (2016). Xenocracy: State, Class, and Colonialism in the Ionian Islands, 1815–1864. Berghahn Books. ISBN 978-1-7853-3262-3.
- Dagkli, Eleni (2018). Septinsular Republic: The organization and the society under the constitution of 1803 (Thesis). Thessaloniki: University of Aristotle.
- Kallivretakis, Leonidas (2003). "Ένοπλα Ελληνικά σώματα στη δίνη των Ναπολεοντείων πολέμων (1798–1815)" [Greek armed corps in the throes of the Napoleonic wars (1798–1815)]. Ιστορία του Νέου Ελληνισμού 1770–2000, Τόμος 1: Η Οθωμανική κυριαρχία, 1770–1821 [History of Modern Hellenism 1770–2000, Volume 1: Ottoman rule, 1770–1821] (in Greek). Athens: Ellinika Grammata. pp. 185–200. hdl:10442/8780. ISBN 960-406-540-8.
- Karapidakis, Nikos (2003). "Τα Επτάνησα: Ευρωπαϊκοί ανταγωνισμοί μετά την πτώση της Βενετίας" [The Heptanese: European rivalries after the fall of Venice]. Ιστορία του Νέου Ελληνισμού 1770–2000, Τόμος 1: Η Οθωμανική κυριαρχία, 1770–1821 [History of Modern Hellenism 1770–2000, Volume 1: Ottoman rule, 1770–1821] (in Greek). Athens: Ellinika Grammata. pp. 151–184. ISBN 960-406-540-8.
- Leontsinis, George N. (2014). "The Ionian Islands and the Greek Revolution". In Anthony Hirst; Patrick Sammon (eds.). The Ionian Islands: Aspects of their History and Culture. Cambridge Scholars Publishing. pp. 124–145. ISBN 978-1-4438-6278-3.
- Mackridge, Peter (2014). "Introduction". In Anthony Hirst; Patrick Sammon (eds.). The Ionian Islands: Aspects of their History and Culture. Cambridge Scholars Publishing. pp. 1–23. ISBN 978-1-4438-6278-3.
- Mackridge, Peter (2014). "Venise après Venise: Official Languages in the Ionian Islands, 1797–1864". Byzantine and Modern Greek Studies. 38 (1): 68–90. doi:10.1179/0307013113Z.00000000038.
- McKnight, James Lawrence (1965). Admiral Ushakov and the Ionian Republic: The Genesis of Russia's First Balkan Satellite (PhD thesis). University of Wisconsin, Madison. OCLC 47945614.
- Moschonas, Nikolaos (1975). "Τα Ιόνια Νησιά κατά την περίοδο 1797–1821" [The Ionian Islands in the period 1797–1821]. In Christopoulos, Georgios A. & Bastias, Ioannis K. (eds.). Ιστορία του Ελληνικού Έθνους [History of the Greek Nation] (in Greek). Vol. ΙΑ: Ο Ελληνισμός υπό ξένη κυριαρχία (περίοδος 1669 - 1821), Τουρκοκρατία - Λατινοκρατία [Hellenism under Foreign Rule (Period 1669 - 1821), Turkocracy – Latinocracy]. Athens: Ekdotiki Athinon. pp. 382–402. ISBN 978-960-213-100-8.
- Nikiforou, Aliki, ed. (2001). Επτάνησος Πολιτεία: Τα μείζονα ιστορικά ζητήματα (in Greek). Corfu: General State Archives – Archives of the Prefecture of Corfu. ISBN 960-85548-3-7.
- Pagratis, Gerassimos D. (2019). ""Russians' first Satellite in the Balkans" or "The first Independent Greek State"?: New perspectives in the history of the Septinsular Republic (1800–1807)". El parlamentarisme en perspectiva histórica: parlaments multinivell. Vol. II. Parlament de les Illes Balears Institut Estudis Autonòmics. pp. 795–801. ISBN 978-84-09-11162-6.
- Psimouli, Vaso (2006). Σούλι και Σουλιώτες [Souli and the Souliotes] (in Greek). Athens: Estia. ISBN 960-05-1207-8.
- Vakalopoulos, Apostolos E. (1973). Ιστορία του νέου ελληνισμού, Τόμος Δ′: Τουρκοκρατία 1669–1812 – Η οικονομική άνοδος και ο φωτισμός του γένους (Έκδοση Β′) [History of modern Hellenism, Volume IV: Turkish rule 1669–1812 – Economic upturn and enlightenment of the nation] (in Greek) (2nd ed.). Thessaloniki: Emm. Sfakianakis & Sons.
- Zanou, Konstantina (2019). Transnational Patriotism in the Mediterranean, 1800–1850: Stammering the Nation. Oxford University Press. ISBN 978-0-1987-8870-6.
