= Ionian obol =

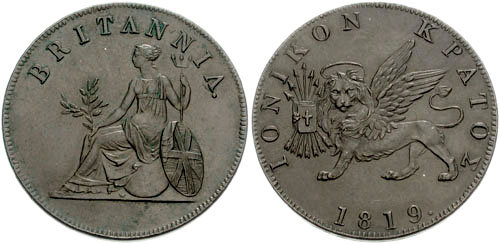
1-obol coin, 1819

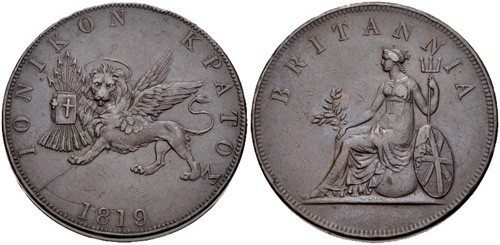
Two-obol coin ("diobol"), 1819

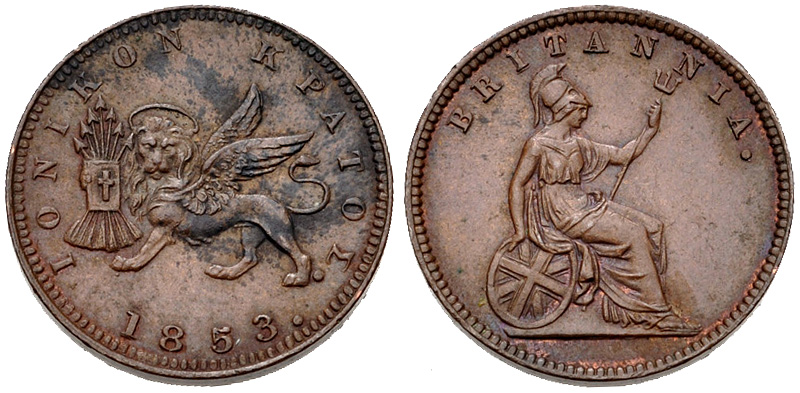
1 obol, 1853

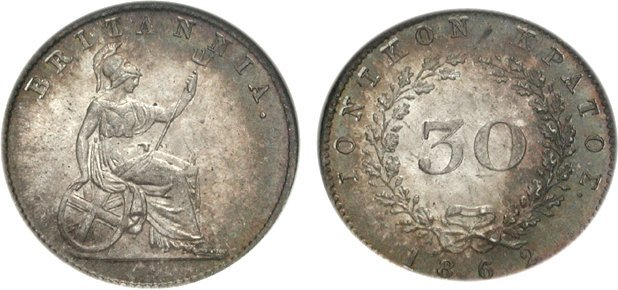
30 oboli, Ionian Islands, 1862

The obol (Greek: ὀβολός, obolos; plural oboli) was the currency of the United States of the Ionian Islands between 1819 and 1863. Until 1834, 1 obol = 4 lepta (singular lepton), after which 1 obol = 5 lepta. Throughout its existence, the obol was equal to a British half penny (therefore, £1 sterling = 480 oboli). The obol replaced a series of countermarked coins denominated in Turkish paras and copper gazete coins. The obol was issued by the British and was replaced by the Greek drachma when the Ionian Islands were given to Greece, at a rate of 1 drachma = 20 oboli.

An unusual denomination was the silver 30 Lepta coin.
