= Isabella Teotochi Albrizzi =

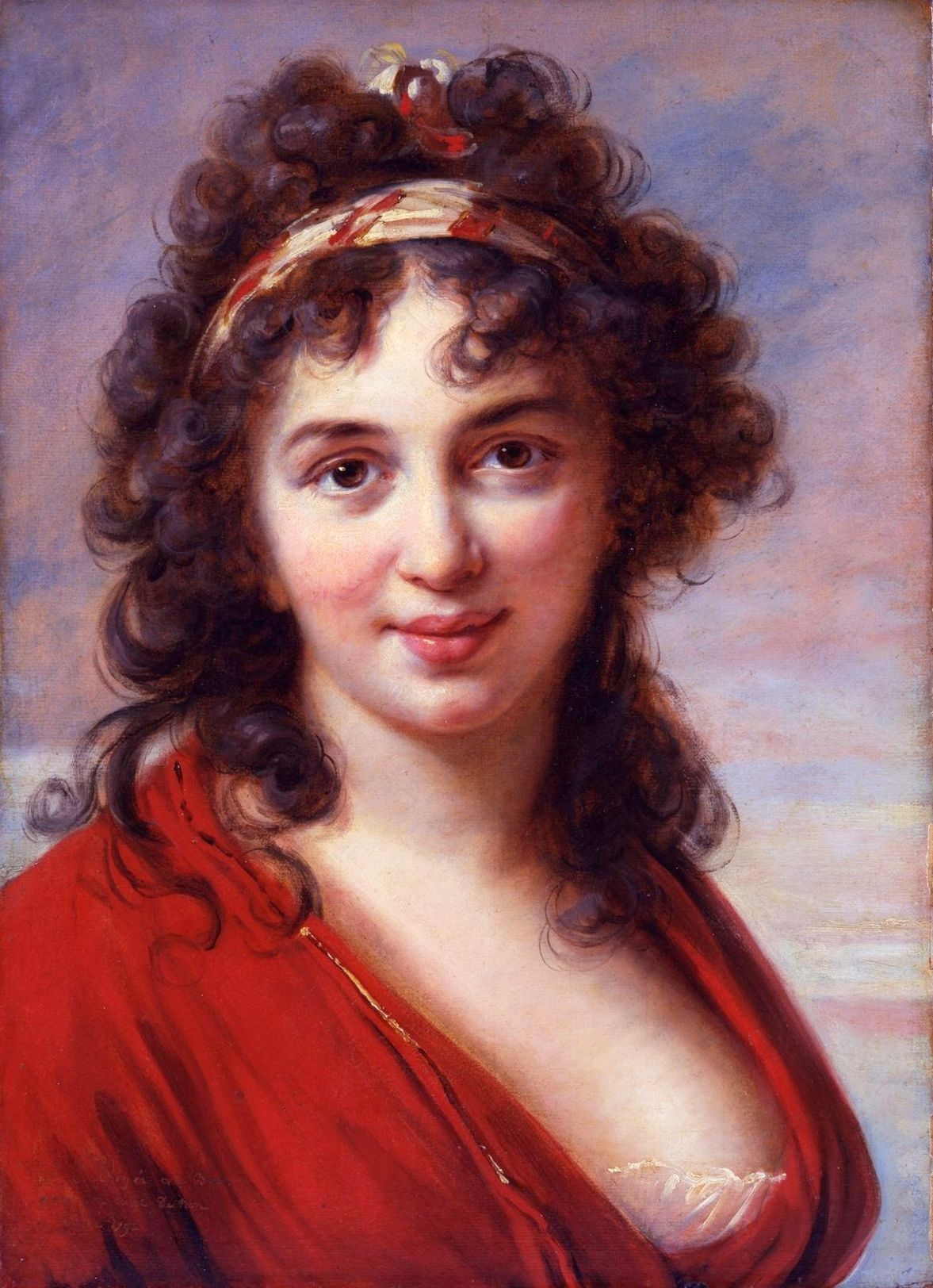
Isabella Teotochi Albrizzi by Élisabeth-Louise Vigée-Le Brun.

Isabella Teotochi Albrizzi, born Elisabetta Theotoki (Greek: Ελισάβετ Θεοτόκη, Corfu, 1760 - Venice, 27 September 1836) was a Greek - Venetian writer, salonist and countess.

== Life ==
Born in 1760 in Corfu, she was a member of the prominent Theotokis family. In 1776 she married the Venetian patrician Carlo Antonio Marin but they divorced after a couple of years. Meanwhile, Teotochi moved to Venice where she completed her studies and gained the reputation of a well-educated woman. In 1796 she was married again, this time to the state inquisitor Giovanni Battista VI Giuseppe Albrizzi.

Isabella Albrizzi was the host of a salon which was the literary and artistically center of contemporary Venice. Among her friends and guests were Ugo Foscolo, Antonio Canova, Lord Byron and Ippolito Pindemonte. In 1807 she published her work Ritratti.

She died in Venice, on 27 September 1836. She had two sons, Giovan Battista Marin and Giovanni Battista Giuseppe Albrizzi.

== Bibliography ==
- Henry Gardiner Adams, ed. (1857). "Albrizzi, Teotochi Isabella". A Cyclopaedia of Female Biography: 28–29. Wikidata Q115584414.
- Svensk uppslagsbok. Lund 1929
- Dalton, Susan (2006). "Searching for Virtue: Physiognomy, Sociability, and Taste in Isabella Teotochi Albrizzi's "Ritratti"". Eighteenth-Century Studies. 40 (1): 85–108. JSTOR 30053493.
