= Spyridon Georgios Theotokis =

Greek politician and scholar

Count Spyridon Georgios Theotokis

Prince of the Septinsular Republic
- In office March 1800 – November 1803
- Succeeded by: Antonios Komoutos

President of the Ionian Senate
- In office March 1800 – November 1803
- Succeeded by: Antonios Komoutos

Personal details
- Born: 1722 Corfu, Venetian Ionian Islands
- Died: 1803 (aged 80–81) Corfu, Septinsular Republic
- Occupation: Politician, Scholar

Count Spyridon Georgios Theotokis (Greek: Σπυρίδων Γεώργιος Θεοτόκης, Italian: Spiridione Giorgio Teotochi; 1722 – 1803) was a Greek politician and scholar who served as President of the Ionian Senate and head of state of the Septinsular Republic with the title of prince.

== Life and career ==
Theotokis was born in Venetian-ruled Corfu in 1722 and belonged to the noble Theotokis family. During the French occupation of Corfu, he was appointed as the president of the provisional municipality. When the French left Corfu in 1799 and the provisional municipality was dissolved, Theotokis was appointed president of the Central Administration where he sought democratic reforms.

In 1800 Theotokis was elected the president of the Ionian Senate with the title of prince. Theotokis was committed to improving the judicial system of the Septinsular Republic. He was also a published author, writing treatises and poems in Italian and Latin. Theotokis died on 24 November 1803. Following his death, Antonios Komoutos from Zakynthos was elected president of the Senate and head of state of the Septinsular Republic.
