= Ionian Senate =

Executive and legislative body of the Septinsular Republic

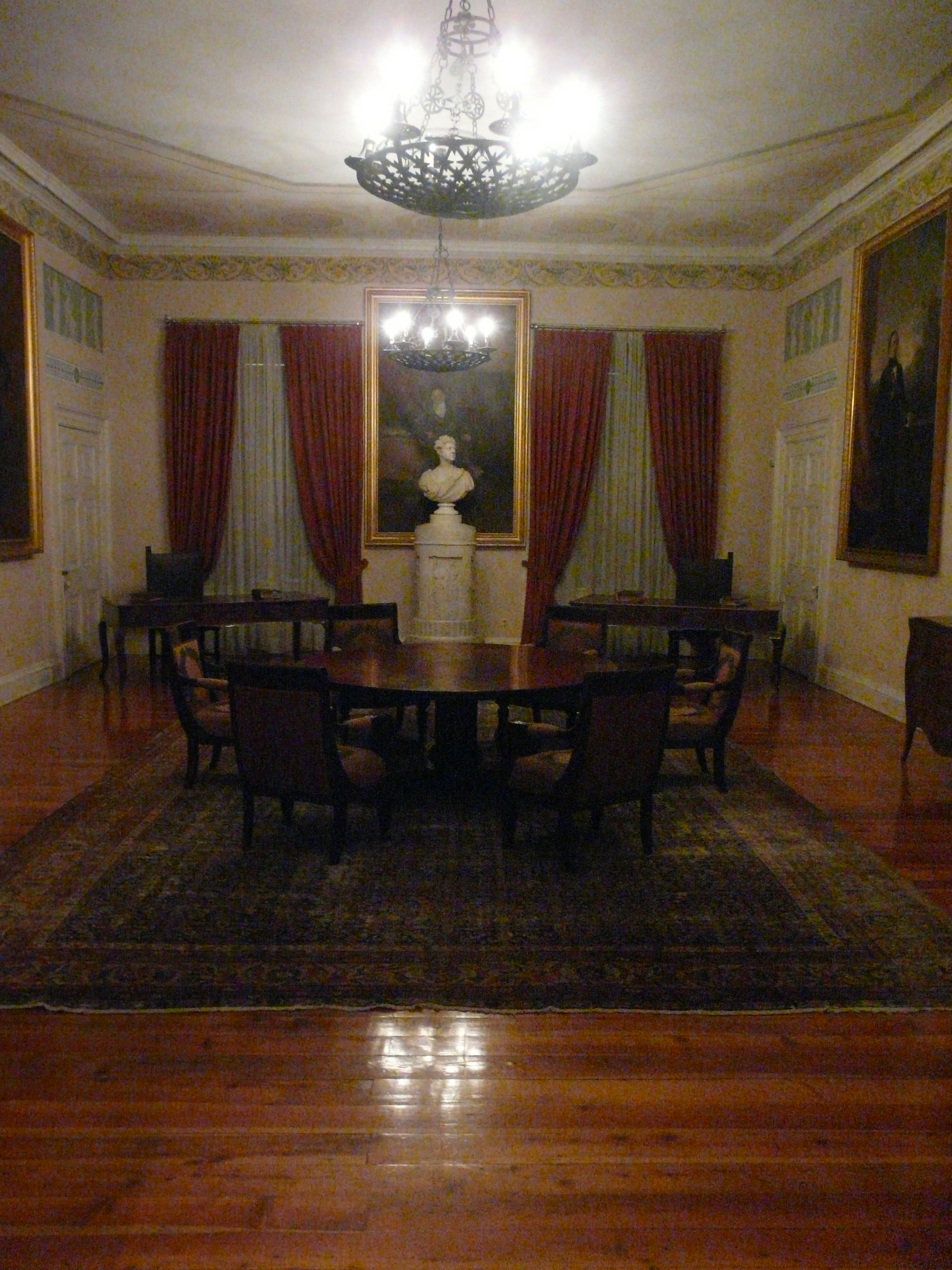
Meeting room of the Ionian Senate, in the Palace of St. Michael and St. George, Corfu

The Ionian Senate (Greek: Ιόνιος Γερουσία, romanized: Ionios Gerousia) was the executive and later legislative body of the Septinsular Republic (1800–1807/1814) and the executive council of its successor, the United States of the Ionian Islands (1815–1864). During most of its history it was housed at the Palace of St. Michael and St. George in Corfu, where its meeting room can still be seen with the original furniture.

== Septinsular Republic ==
After the end of the French rule over the Ionian Islands by a joint Russo-Ottoman fleet in 1798–99, on 6 May [O.S. 24 April] 1800, the commanders of the two fleets announced that the Ionian Islands would comprise a single state, governed by a Senate (Γερουσία) in Corfu city, composed of three representatives each from Corfu, Cephalonia, and Zakynthos, two from Lefkada, and one each from Ithaca, Kythira, and Paxoi. The Venetian nobleman Angelo Orio, the last Venetian provveditore of Argostoli, was appointed head of the Senate. After Orio was sent to Constantinople to negotiate the new state's constitution, the presidency of the Senate passed to Count Spyridon Georgios Theotokis.

According to the so-called "Byzantine Constitution" in 1800, the Senate would remain the highest authority in the new, federal, Septinsular Republic. It would be composed of the representatives of the islands, and its president would be the Republic's head of state. In February 1803, the Senate was reformed to comprise seventeen members, with four members each from Corfu, Cephalonia, and Zakynthos, two from Lefkada, and one each from the other islands. Election to the Senate was through electoral colleges, the so-called sincliti, which were restricted to the aristocracy. The new constitution, promulgated in October 1803, introduced the principle of separation of powers, and instituted a new body, the censors (censori) who were to safeguard compliance to the constitution and function as advisors to the Senate. The Senate remained the main executive body, with three branches for foreign affairs, interior and finance affairs, and military affairs. After Theotokis's death on 24 November, a new president of the Senate and head of state of the Republic was elected, Antonios Komoutos from Zakynthos.

The Senate was converted into a legislative body with the 1806 "Russian Constitution", still with seventeen members: four each for Corfu, Cephalonia, and Zakynthos, two for Lefkada, and one each for the minor islands, of whom nine served for three years and eight for four. Executive authority was instead vested in a five-member college, the principato. After the cession of the Republic to France in the Treaty of Tilsit and the start of the second period of French rule, the Senate was retained, alone among the Septinsular Republic's institutions, but its members were now appointed rather than elected by the French governor-general.

After the downfall of Napoleon and the restoration of Louis XVIII, and the surrender of Corfu to the British, the Ionian Senate, declaring that the Republic had been suspended but not abolished under the French and British occupation, tried to advocate for the independence of the Islands in the Congress of Vienna, but the British governor-general, Sir James Campbell, refused to accept this view, holding that the Republic had ceased to exist after Tilsit, and regarding the appointed Senate as not representative of the Ionian people.

== United States of the Ionian Islands ==
According to the 1817 constitution of the British protectorate of the Ionian Islands, the Ionian Senate was the executive body (the legislative body being the Ionian Assembly). It had six members, elected by the Assembly for five-year terms: a president, one delegate for each of the major four islands (Corfu, Lefkada, Cephalonia and Zakynthos), and one delegate rotating between the minor three (Paxoi, Ithaca and Kythira). The Ionian Senate was abolished with the Union of the Ionian Islands with Greece in 1864.

== Sources ==
- Karapidakis, Nikos (2003). "Τα Επτάνησα: Ευρωπαϊκοί ανταγωνισμοί μετά την πτώση της Βενετίας" [The Heptanese: European rivalries after the fall of Venice]. Ιστορία του Νέου Ελληνισμού 1770–2000, Τόμος 1: Η Οθωμανική κυριαρχία, 1770–1821 [History of Modern Hellenism 1770–2000, Volume 1: Ottoman rule, 1770–1821] (in Greek). Athens: Ellinika Grammata. pp. 151–184. ISBN 960-406-540-8.
- Moschonas, Nikolaos (1975). "Τα Ιόνια Νησιά κατά την περίοδο 1797–1821" [The Ionian Islands in the period 1797–1821]. In Christopoulos, Georgios A. & Bastias, Ioannis K. (eds.). Ιστορία του Ελληνικού Έθνους, Τόμος ΙΑ΄: Ο Ελληνισμός υπό ξένη κυριαρχία (περίοδος 1669 - 1821), Τουρκοκρατία - Λατινοκρατία [History of the Greek Nation, Volume XI: Hellenism under Foreign Rule (Period 1669 - 1821), Turkocracy – Latinocracy] (in Greek). Athens: Ekdotiki Athinon. pp. 382–402. ISBN 978-960-213-100-8.
