= Anglo-Russian occupation of Naples =

1805–1806 occupation during the War of the Third Coalition

The Anglo-Russian occupation of Naples was the stationing of British and Russian forces in the Kingdom of Naples from the summer of 1805 until January 1806 during the War of the Third Coalition.

== Background ==
A previous cooperation in July 1799 between British forces led by Horatio Nelson and Russian forces under the command of Fyodor Ushakov led to the collapse of the Parthenopean Republic, a semi-autonomous state in the Kingdom of Naples. However, the Franco-Neapolitan war ended on 28 March 1801 with the Treaty of Florence, in which Neapolitan government was forced to make various concessions to France, including closing its ports to all Ottoman and British ships, giving the French preferential treatment in trade, and allow the stationing of French garrisons in the Apulian trading ports of Pescara, Brindisi and Otranto and the province of Terra d'Otranto on Neapolitan costs.

For his upcoming confrontation with Austria and Russia in Central Europe in autumn 1805, French emperor Napoleon sought to secure his southern flank. He was willing to abandon the French-occupied coastal cities in Apulia to Naples in exchange for Neapolitan neutrality in the war ahead. King Ferdinand of Naples and Sicily agreed and signed a treaty with Napoleon.

== Course ==
However, after receiving the Apulian cities, Ferdinand soon went back on his promise and allied himself with France's enemies Britain and Russia, which landed troops in Naples with his permission in order to guard against a possible French invasion, and to plan an attack on the Napoleonic states in central and northern Italy. The British commander was general James Henry Craig, who had ill health at the time and had 7,000 troops, while the Russian forces were led by Maurice Lacy and Roman Anrep. The combined army was too weak and poorly equipped to withstand any serious French attack.

When the combined Austro–Russian Army was dealt a severe blow by Napoleon at the Battle of Austerlitz on 2 December 1805, 30,000 French troops were freed up for a campaign against Naples. Tsar Alexander I of Russia ordered his troops to withdraw from southern Italy to Corfu, which they did after Lacy received the tsar's dispatch on 7 January 1806. Meanwhile, Craig was awaiting orders from Lord Castlereagh; he wrote on 30 December that he received his most recent instructions on 16 October. Against the wishes of ambassador Hugh Elliot, who warned evacuation would provoke the French to attack, Craig had the vastly outnumbered British troops depart Naples and set sail for the island of Sicily on 10 January 1806, ending the Anglo-Russian occupation and leaving the Neapolitan army to defend the kingdom on its own. The British fleet reached Messina on 22 January and the soldiers disembarked.

== British Expeditionary Force ==
- Lieutenant-General Sir James Henry Craig

- Advanced Corps: Brigadier-General John Brodrick

- Corsican Rangers (740 men)
- Battalion of light infantry
- Battalion of grenadiers
- Chasseurs Britanniques (645 men)

- First Brigade: Brigadier-General Wroth Palmer Acland

- 20th Regiment of Foot (801 men)
- 35th Regiment of Foot (1003 men)
- 61st Regiment of Foot (834 men)

- Second Brigade: Brigadier-General Galbraith Lowry Cole

- 27th Regiment of Foot (1063 men)
- 58th Regiment of Foot (973 men)
- De Watteville's Regiment (725 men)

- Royal Artillery (273 men)

- 2 light brigades
- 1 heavy brigade (4 howitzers, 4 12-pounders, 8 6-pounders)

- Ancillary units

- 2 squadrons of the 20th Light Dragoons (335 men)
- Staff Corps (20 men)
- Royal Engineers (19 men)

== Aftermath ==
After Austerlitz, Napoleon rallied his forces to punish Ferdinand's treason and take possession of all of southern Italy. French troops invaded and conquered the kingdom from 8 February to 18 July 1806.
