= Treaty of London (1864) =

1864 treaty ceding the Ionian Islands to Greece

Treaty between Great Britain, France, Russia, and Greece, respecting the Union of the Ionian Islands to the Kingdom of Greece.
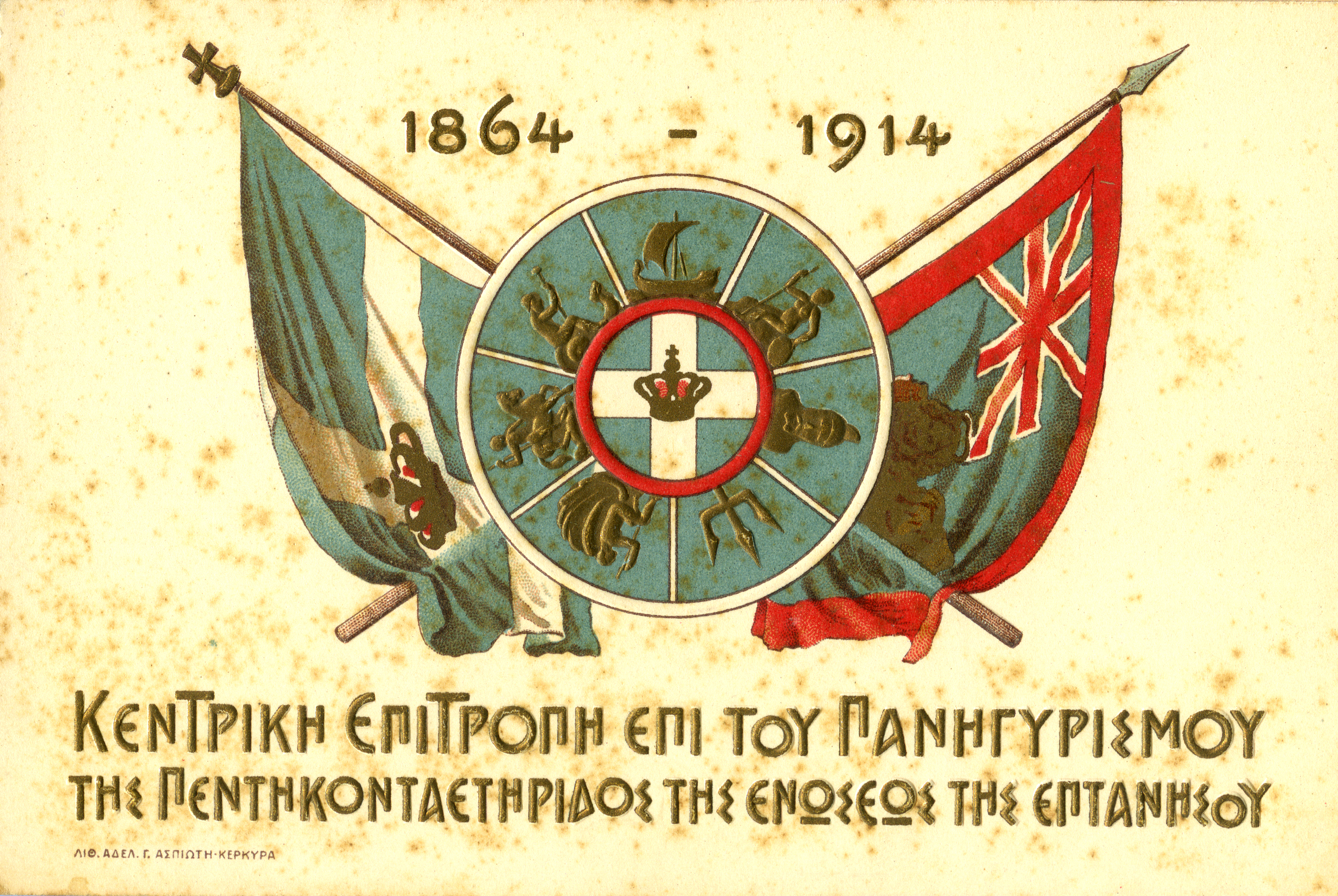
- 1914 postal card for the fiftieth anniversary of the union of the Ionian Islands with Greece
- Type: Multilateral treaty
- Context: Union of the Ionian Islands with Greece
- Drafted: 23 September 1863
- Signed: 29 March 1864
- Location: London, England
- Effective: 21 May 1864
- Negotiators: Russell; Ch.Tricoupis; La Tour d'Auvergne; Brunnow
- Original signatories: Greece; Prussia; Russia; United Kingdom
- Ratifiers: Greece; Prussia; Russia; United Kingdom

The Treaty of London in 1864 resulted in the United Kingdom ceding the United States of the Ionian Islands to Greece. Britain had held an amical protectorate over the islands since the 1815 Treaty of Paris.

The federated United States of the Ionian Islands included seven islands off the coasts of Epirus and the Peloponnese, that had remained in Venetian hands until 1797 and escaped Ottoman rule. Of the seven, six lay in the Ionian Sea, off the western coast of the Greek mainland. These six states were Corfù (Kerkyra), Ithaca(Ithaki), Paxò(paxoi/paxos), Cephalonia, Zante (Zakynthos) and Santa Maura (Lefkas). Cerigo (Kythera) was also a state of the federation, although it is situated southeast of the Peloponnese.

Ever since the Greek War of Independence against the Ottoman Empire, the people of the Ionian Islands had pressed for union, or enosis, with Greece. At a meeting of the British Cabinet in 1862, Foreign Secretary Henry John Temple, 3rd Viscount Palmerston decided to cede the islands to Greece. This policy was also favoured by Queen Victoria.

The decision to cede the islands was also influenced by the accession to the Greek throne of the Danish prince George, a committed Anglophile. Indeed, in a referendum in November 1862, the Greeks had elected Queen Victoria's second son, Prince Alfred, as their king, partly in the hope of receiving the Ionian Islands.

After long negotiations with Greece, the Treaty of London was signed by Greek delegate Charilaos Trikoupis on 29 March 1864. On 21 May 1864 the British departed and the Ionian Islands became three provinces of the Kingdom of Greece, although Britain retained use of the port on Corfu.

This can be seen as the first example of voluntary decolonization by Britain. For Greece, the incorporation of the Ionian Islands was the first of several territorial increases to 1947.

== Terms of the Treaty ==
- Demolition of the fortifications of Corfu.
- Preservation of the rights of the United Kingdom to the use of the port of Corfu.
- Transfer to the Greek State of public debts, commercial contracts and compensations to British individuals and legal entities.

== Maps ==
In yellow the situation of the islands in relation to the current borders of Greece. The islands formed the British protectorate of the United States of the Ionian Islands from 1815 and were transferred to the Kingdom of Greece in 1864.

Expansion of the Kingdom of Greece, of which the incorporation of the Ionian Islands was the first territorial gain.

== See also ==
- Treaties of London
