= United States of the Ionian Islands =

British protectorate in western Greece, 1815–1864

United States of the Ionian Islands Ἡνωμένον Κράτος τῶν Ἰονίων Νήσων (Greek) Inoménon-Krátos ton Ioníon Níson Stati Uniti delle Isole Ionie (Italian)
- 1815–1864
- Flag Coat of arms

- The Republic's territory extended to the seven main islands plus the smaller islets of the Ionian Sea
- Status: Protectorate of the British Empire
- Capital: Corfu
- Official languages: Greek; English (until 1851); Italian (until 1851)
- Common languages: Venetian
- Religion: Greek Orthodox
- Government: Federal oligarchy
- Monarch/Protector
  - 1815–1820: George III
  - 1820–1830: George IV
  - 1830–1837: William IV
  - 1837–1864: Victoria
- Lord High Commissioner
  - 1816–1824: Sir Thomas Maitland (first)
  - 1859–1864: Sir Henry Knight Storks (last)
- President of the Senate
- Legislature: Parliament
  - Upper house: Ionian Senate (executive)^{b}
  - Lower house: Ionian Assembly
- History
  - Congress of Vienna: 9 June 1815 (signed)
  - Protectorate established: 9 November 1815
  - Constitution: 26 August 1817
  - Resolution for union with Greece: 26 November 1850
  - Treaty of London: 29 March 1864
  - Union with Greece: 21 May 1864

Area
- 1864: 4,696 km^{2} (1,813 sq mi)

Population
  - 1864: 236,000
- Currency: Obol (1818–1864)
Preceded by	Succeeded by
French rule in the Ionian Islands	Kingdom of Greece; Ioannina Eyalet
- Today part of: Greece
- Italian was used as the official language of administration during the first Parliament only. The Senate is listed in the Constitution as the Executive branch of government. It shared legislative power with the Legislative Assembly, and in some British sources it appears as the Executive Council. References: Capital city; languages.

The United States of the Ionian Islands (Note: Greek: Ἡνωμένον Κράτος τῶν Ἰονίων Νήσων, romanised: Inoménon-Krátos ton Ioníon Níson, lit. 'United State of the Ionian Islands'; Italian: Stati Uniti delle Isole Ionie) was a Greek state and amical protectorate of the United Kingdom between 1815 and 1864. The successor state of the Septinsular Republic, it covered the territory of the Ionian Islands, as well as the port of Parga on the Greek mainland.

It was ceded by the British to Greece as a gift to the newly enthroned King George I, apart from Parga, which had been sold to Ali Pasha of Ioannina in 1819.

== History ==
Before the French Revolutionary Wars, the Ionian Islands had been part of the Republic of Venice. When the 1797 Treaty of Campo Formio dissolved the Republic of Venice, they were annexed to the French Republic. Between 1798 and 1799, the French were driven out by a joint Russo-Ottoman force.

After the War of the Fourth Coalition, the Ionian Islands were occupied by the French Empire as stipulated in the Treaty of Tilsit. In 1809, Britain defeated the French fleet off Zakynthos island on 2 October, and captured Kefalonia, Kythira, and Zakynthos. The British proceeded to capture Lefkada in 1810.

Under the Treaty between Great Britain and [Austria, Prussia and] Russia, respecting the Ionian Islands (signed in Paris on 5 November 1815), as one of the treaties signed during the Peace of Paris (1815), Britain obtained a protectorate over the Ionian Islands, and under Article VIII of the treaty the Austrian Empire was granted the same trading privileges with the Islands as Britain.

During this period, the British brought thousands of Maltese labourers to the Ionian Islands to work as builders and artisans, forming the basis of the Corfiot Maltese community.

A few years later Greek nationalist groups started to form. Although their energy in the early years was directed to supporting their fellow Greek revolutionaries in the revolution against the Ottoman Empire, they switched their focus to enosis with Greece following their independence. The Party of Radicals (Greek: Κόμμα των Ριζοσπαστών) was founded in 1848 as a pro-enosis political party. In September 1848, there were skirmishes with the British garrison in Argostoli and Lixouri on Kefalonia. The island's populace did not hide their growing demands for enosis, and newspapers on the islands frequently published articles criticising British policies in the protectorate. On 15 August 1849, another rebellion broke out, which was quashed by Henry George Ward, who proceeded to temporarily impose martial law.

On 26 November 1850, the Radical MP John Detoratos Typaldos proposed in the Ionian parliament the resolution for the enosis of the Ionian Islands with the Kingdom of Greece which was signed by Gerasimos Livadas, Nadalis Domeneginis, George Typaldos, Frangiskos Domeneginis, Ilias Zervos Iakovatos, Iosif Momferatos, Telemachus Paizis, Ioannis Typaldos, Aggelos Sigouros-Dessyllas, Christodoulos Tofanis. In 1862, the party split into two factions, the "United Radical Party" and the "Real Radical Party". During this period of British rule, William Ewart Gladstone visited the islands and recommended their reunion with Greece, to the chagrin of the British government.

On 29 March 1864, representatives of the United Kingdom, Greece, France, and Russia signed the Treaty of London, pledging the transfer of sovereignty to Greece upon ratification; this was meant to bolster the reign of the newly installed King George I of the Hellenes. Thus, on 28 May, by proclamation of the Lord High Commissioner, the Ionian Islands were united with Greece.

== Languages ==
As a result of the long Venetian domination, the Italian language was the language of government, science, and the upper classes, even though the vast majority of the Islanders were monolingual Greek speakers. The replacement of Italian by Greek was envisaged in the second constitution of the Septinsular Republic in 1803 to take place over time by 1820, but the French occupation in 1807 and the succeeding turmoils prevented this from taking place.

After 1814, the British rulers of the Islands published the government gazette in both languages, with Italian initially first, but pushed to second place in 1832 and third place after the introduction of English in 1836. The 1817 constitution of the British protectorate was also written in Italian, but specified Greek as the "national" language and stipulated that all public affairs should come to be conducted in it, while Italian was allowed to remain in use in the interim. However, it was not until 1849 that the Ionian Assembly began holding its sessions in Greek, 1851 that the Ionian legal codes (originally published in Italian in 1841) were translated into Greek, and 1852 that Greek was established as the sole official language.

== States ==
The British royal arms surrounded by the emblems of the seven Ionian Islands. From top, clockwise: Corfu, Zakynthos, Ithaca, Paxos, Kythira, Lefkada, Cephalonia.

The United States of the Ionian Islands was a federation. It included seven island states, each of which was allocated a number of seats in the parliament, the Ionian Senate:

State	Capital	Members elected
Corfu	Corfu	7
Cephalonia	Argostoli	7
Cythera	Kythira	1 or 2
Ithaca	Vathy	1 or 2
Paxos	Gaios	1 or 2
Lefkada	Lefkada	4
Zakynthos	Zakynthos	7

== Government ==
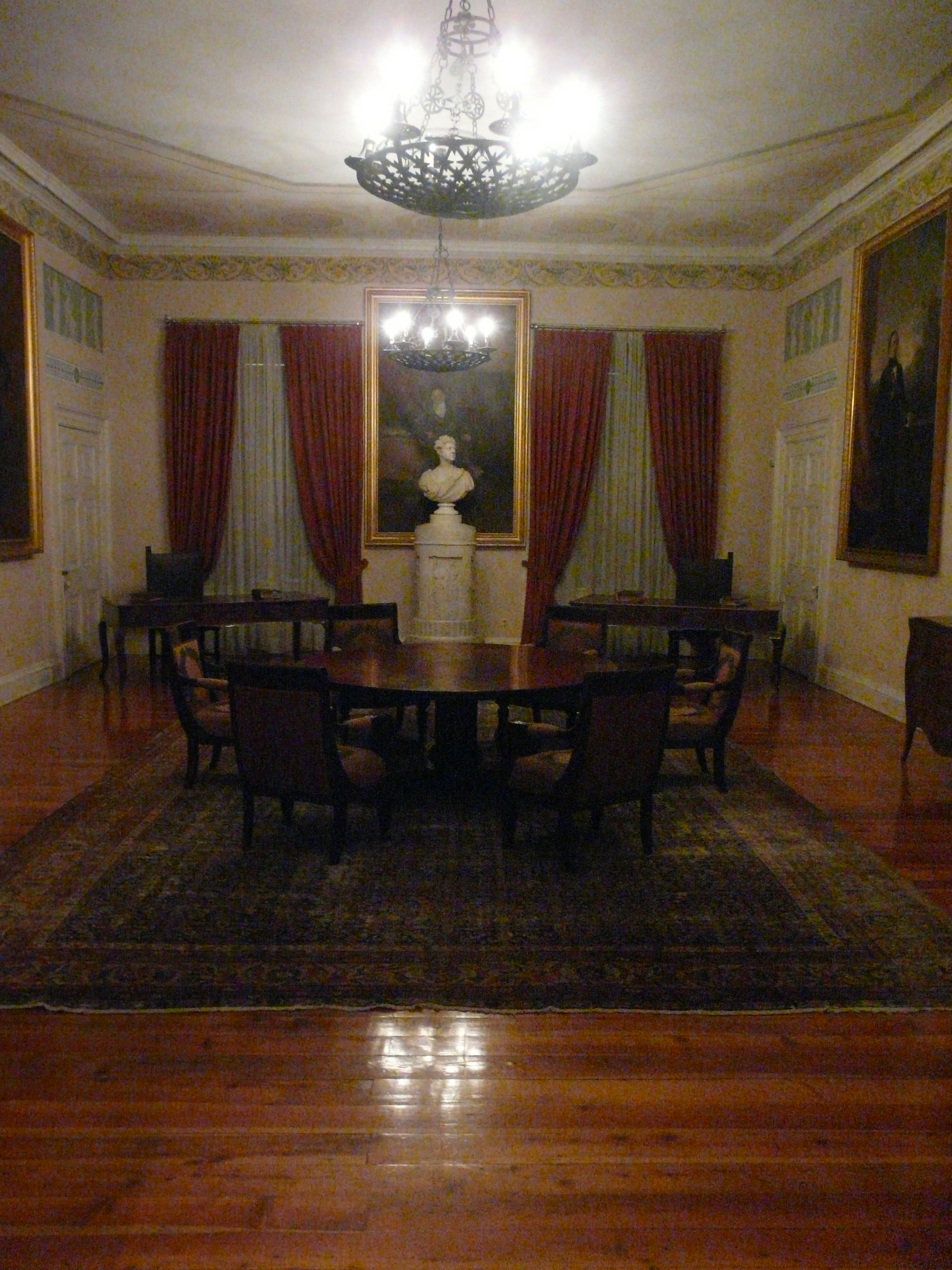
The 17-member Ionian Senate met in this room in the Palace of St. Michael and St. George, Corfu

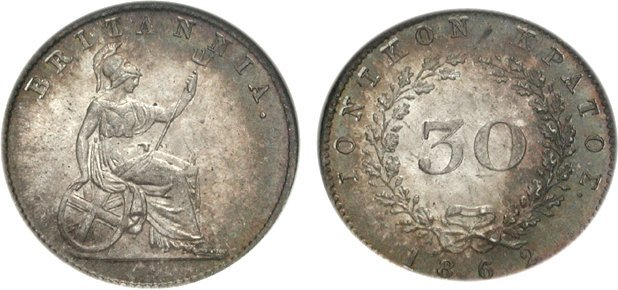
30 oboli, Ionian Islands, 1862

The British organised administration under the direction of a Lord High Commissioner, appointed by the British government. In total, ten men served in this capacity, including William Gladstone as a Lord High Commissioner Extraordinary (in office 1858–1859).

The Ionian Islands had a bicameral legislature, titled the "Parliament of the United States of the Ionian Islands" and composed of a Legislative Assembly and Senate.

The 1818 constitution also established a High Court of Appeal to be called the Supreme Council of Justice of the United States of the Ionian Islands, of which the president was to be known as the Chief Justice, who would rank in precedence immediately after the President of the Senate.

The successive Chief Justices were:

- John Kirkpatrick 1820–1835
- Sir James John Reid 1837–?
- Sir Charles Sargent 1860–?
- Sir Patrick MacChombaich de Colquhoun 1861–1864

== See also ==
- List of Greek countries and regions
- List of Lord High Commissioners of the Ionian Islands
- Order of St Michael and St George, a British order of chivalry created in honour of the protectorate.
