= Currency of Greece =

The currency of Greece is the Euro. Earlier currencies include:

- Phoenix (currency)
- Modern drachma

== See also ==
- Greek money (disambiguation)
