= Lepto =

Lepto may be:

- the Modern Greek term for the Greek lepton unit of currency
- an informal term for the leptospirosis disease, or for the Leptospira bacteria

== See also ==
- Lepton (disambiguation)
