= Greek money =

Greek money or Greek coinage may refer to:

- Ancient Greek coinage
- Byzantine coinage
- Modern drachma
- Greek euro coins

== See also ==
- Currency of Greece
