= My two cents =

Idiomatic expression for expressing an unsolicited opinion

"My two cents" ("my 2¢") and its longer version "put my two cents in" is an American and Australian idiomatic expression for offering one's opinion, taken from the original English idiom "to put in my two-penny worth" or "put my tuppence in".

== Origin ==
The earliest reference to an analogue of "two cents/pence" appears in the lesson of the widow's mite from both the Gospel of Mark and the Gospel of Luke. In the biblical episode, several wealthy temple patrons donate large sums of money, while a poor widow places just two small coins into the offering. She finds greater favour with Jesus than the wealthy patrons, however, as the two coins constitute her whole wealth, as opposed to a tiny fraction of the rich merchants' fortunes.

"My two pennies' worth" might originate from the much older 16th-century English expression, "a penny for your thoughts", possibly a sarcastic response to receiving more opinion than was wanted ("I said a penny for your thoughts, but I got two pennies' worth"). There is also some belief that the idiom may have its origins in the early cost of postage in England, the "twopenny post", where tuppence was the normal charge to post a letter. Further, in the 1920s, the conventional cost of a payphone call in the U.S. was two cents, so standard practice for anyone who might have to use a phone booth to make a call was to always have at least two cents on their person, a practice that may have facilitated use of the idiom.

== Usage ==
"Two cents" refers to an expression of personal opinion: "You had to put your two cents in, didn't you?," or "But that’s just my two cents". It may depreciate the user's opinion by suggesting its value is only two cents, mitigating a contentious remark, as in, "If I may put my two cents in, that hat doesn't do you any favors".

In Australia, the expression was initially "my two bobs' worth". A 'bob' was a shilling in pre-decimal currency, but the expression continued in common usage after currency decimalisation in 1966. For example: "Federal Opposition spokesperson Bob Hawke threw in his two-bobs' worth when he opened the Ironworkers national conference this week". Both "two bobs' worth" and "two cents' worth" are now heard in Australia.

== See also ==
- IMO
- Penny-related idiomatic expressions
