= Poor box =

Box used to collect coins for charitable purposes

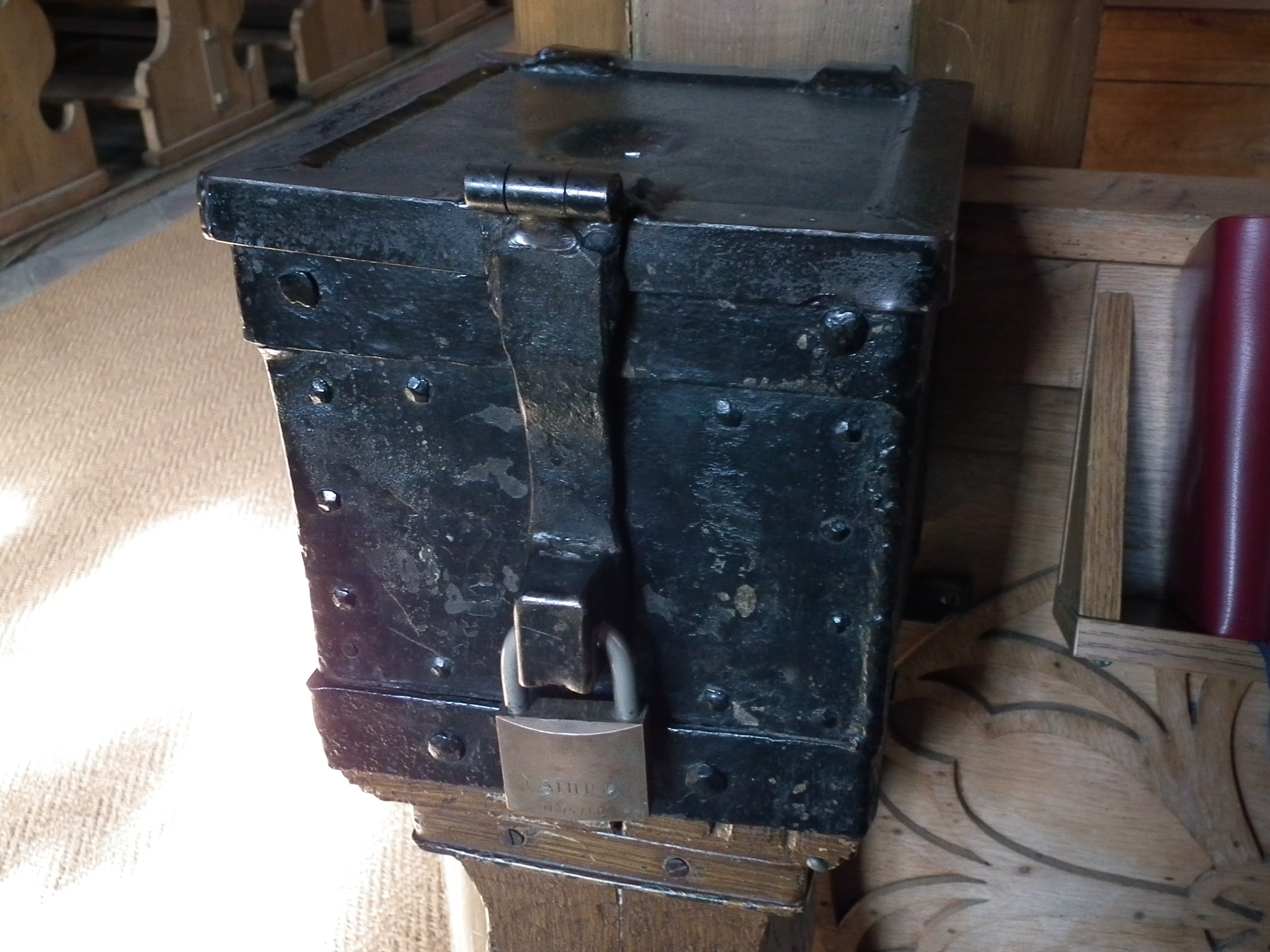
Mite box in the St.-Gallus-Kirche in Ladenburg, Germany

A poor box, alms box, offertory box, or mite box is a box that is used to collect coins for charitable purposes. They can be found in most Christian churches built before the 19th century and were the main source of funds for poor relief.

Contemporary mite boxes are usually made of cardboard and given out to church congregations during the Lenten season. The mite boxes are collected by the church, and the donations are given to the poor. Mite boxes are popular with children because they can fill them with small change, teaching them the principle of giving alms to the poor. The Mite box promotes the spirit of contributing based on the intent to help others, and not on the monetary amount.

== History ==
The origin of the mite box is very old. In 2 Kings 12:9, the priest Jehoiada bored a hole in the lid of a chest and placed it near the first altar. However, this was to fund maintenance rather than alms.

Pope Innocent III, at the end of the twelfth century, allowed some mite boxes to be placed in churches so that the faithful people could at any time dispose their alms.

Many Catholic parish churches in Ireland have two collection boxes, one "for the church" and the other "for the poor". The Irish lower courts also have a court poor box, where a judge can direct a defendant to make a donation to a charity in lieu of a conviction.

== Mite ==
A bronze Widow's Mite or Lepton, minted by Alexander Jannaeus, King of Judaea, 103–76 B.C. obverse: anchor upside-down in circle, reverse: star of eight rays.

The term mite, according to the Webster’s New World College Dictionary, 4th Edition, is defined as any of the following:

1. a very small contribution or amount of money, such as a widow's mite.
2. a very small object, creature, or particle.
3. a coin of very small value, especially an obsolete British coin worth half a farthing.

The etymology of the word mite comes through Middle English and Middle Dutch from the Middle Low German mīte, a small Flemish coin or tiny animal. In biblical times, a mite or lepton was a small coin of almost no worth.

== See also ==
- Coinage of Alexander Jannaeus, King of Judea
- Lesson of the widow's mite
- Lutheran Women's Missionary League
- Tzedakah box
