= Nakaluluwag =

Nakaluluwag or nakakaluwag (variants: nakakaluwang or nakaluluwang) is a Filipino ethic wherein the well-off are socially and morally obligated to help those in need. In Hiligaynon, the term is nakaalwan. It comes from the blending of the Chinese concept of wo (peace and harmony), the Malay culture of familiarity even to distant relatives and other clan members, and the Christian teaching of helping the poor.

== Background ==
There is a traditional Chinese belief that states that in order to have peace and harmony in a kingdom or empire, there should be no extremes in wealth and poverty. Thus, those who are wealthy should give some of their wealth to those living in destitution. Thus, the poor will not take arms and revolt against those living in opulence.

With the introduction of Christian teachings by the Spanish missionaries starting in the 16th century, the indigenous Filipino ethic was somehow refined to benevolence to all those in need, in general. The term and its variants have been incorporated in a number of Tagalog idioms and proverbs. Through the Spanish and the American colonial periods, and even the Japanese Occupation, as linguistic categorization emerges in the Filipino language as a representation of Filipino world view and causality, the concept of nakaluluwag further modified social perception and thereby leads to a continual interaction between the Filipino language and philosophy.

In some Filipino artworks, those in need are pictured as tightly clinging to what they have, and come into grips. While those who are well-off are pictured as willing to let go of some of their possessions for those in need. Maluwag or maluwang literally means "lightly held", "loose", or "spacious". It may also imply sufficient freedom to move around or having a comfortable space to work on. The term implies willingness in giving and helping: "maluwag sa kalooban" and those familiar with accounting concepts often substitute the term "liquid" as in "Liquid ka ba ngayon? Puede bang makahiram?" ("Are you liquid at this time? Can you lend me some amount?").

Even some Filipino grade school children form small informal cooperatives and do paluwagan which is essentially a group money lending scheme. However, the term magpaluwal has become synonymous with simple money lending, while the ethic nakaluluwag involves giving.

== Academic interpretations of nakaluluwag ==
This Filipino ethic of giving includes some sacrifice on the part of the giver: the person giving (nakaluluwag) should at the very least, feel some discomfort. One should "get hurt" by his or her act of giving. Otherwise, the essence of sacrifice will be absent. This is similar but not identical to the Christian lesson of the widow's mite present in the Synoptic Gospels (Mark 12:38–44, Luke 20:45–47,Luke 21:1–4).

The concept also includes relativism: some may be poor but they can consider themselves "nakaluluwag" to those who are much poorer, as rendered in a Tagalog commentary on Jeremiah 24:1. Even Filipino converts to the Church of Jesus Christ of Latter-day Saints translates the phrase "the rich" as "nakaluluwag". Those taking the Conflict theory approach to the study of society may suspect the true intentions of the "nakaluluwag". However, some consider more than the financial aspect of the concept. The ethic involves fulfillment in doing a social obligation. This Filipino concept appears to be present even for the Filipino emigrants.

According to Antonio Levy S. Ingles Jr. of De La Salle-College of Saint Benilde, this Filipino ethic is priceless and may bring about peace and harmony during times of crisis. He claims that "it is a Filipino affirmation of a sustainable world view and global care-giving ethic".
