= Ancient drachma =

Ancient Greek currency

In ancient Greece, the drachma (Greek: δραχμή, romanized: drachmḗ, [drakʰmέː]; pl. drachmae or drachmas) was a currency unit and coin used by many city-states. The drachma originated in around the 6th century BC and continued in use into the Roman period. The coin, usually made of silver or sometimes gold had its origins in a bartering system that referred to a drachma as a handful of wooden spits or arrows. The drachma was unique to each city state that minted them, and were sometimes circulated all over the Mediterranean. The coinage of Athens was considered to be the strongest and became the most popular.

Drachma in the Greek world

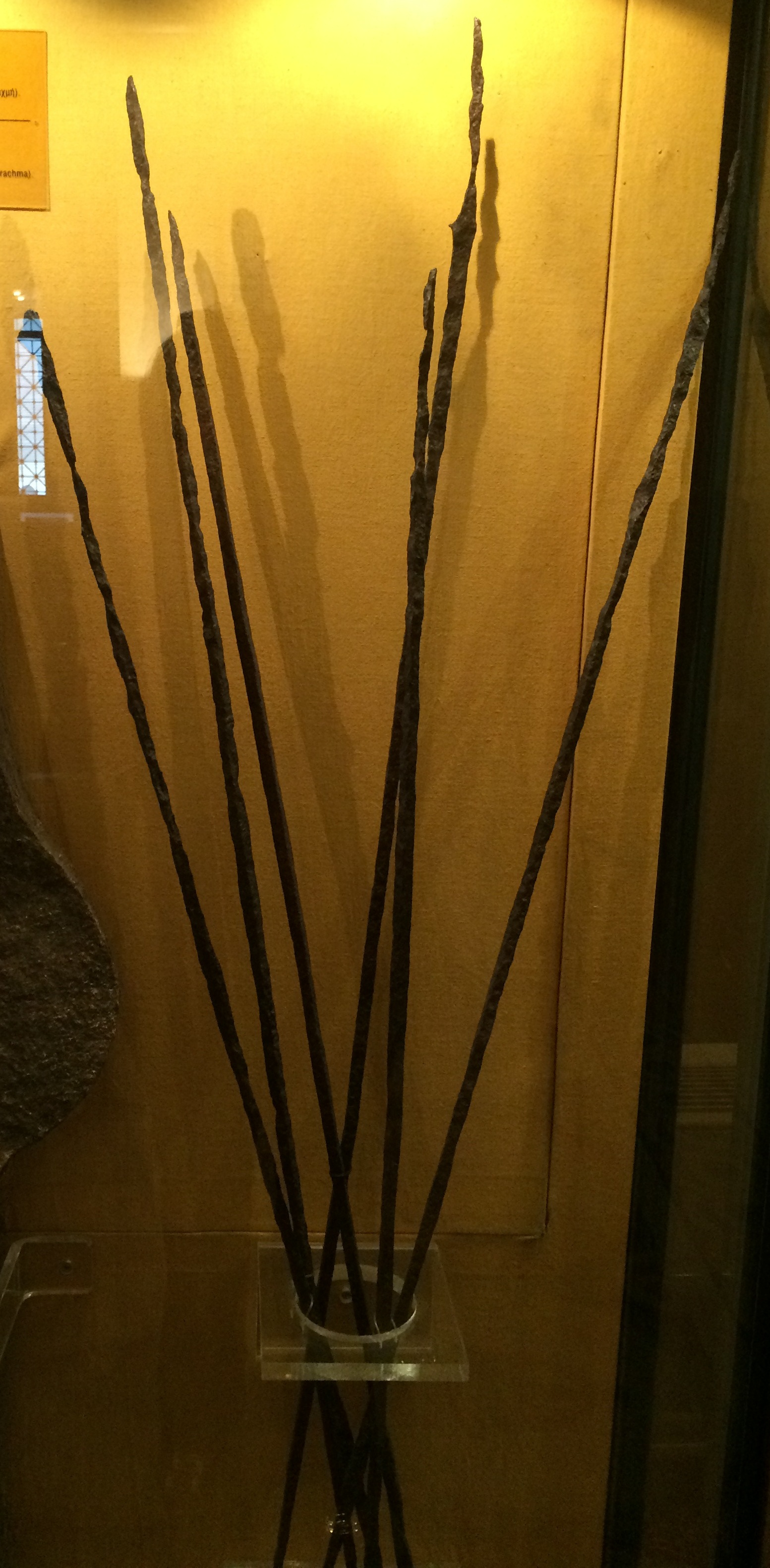
Above: Six rod-shaped obeloi (oboloi) displayed at the Numismatic Museum of Athens, discovered at Heraion of Argos. Below: grasp (Note: δράσσομαι, drassomai, "grasp"; cf.: δράξ, drax, and drachma itself, i.e. "grasp with the hand".) of six oboloi forming one drachma.

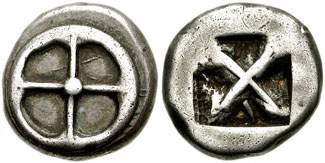
Athenian silver didrachm of "heraldic type" from the time of Peisistratos, 545–510 BC. Obverse: Four-spoked wheel. Reverse: Incuse square, divided diagonally.

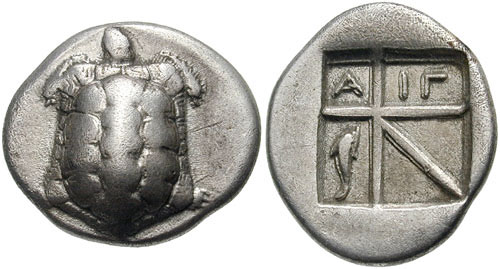
Greek drachma of Aegina. Obverse: Land Chelone / Reverse: ΑΙΓ(ΙΝΑ) and dolphin. The oldest Aegina chelone coins depicted sea turtles and were minted ca. 700–550 BC.

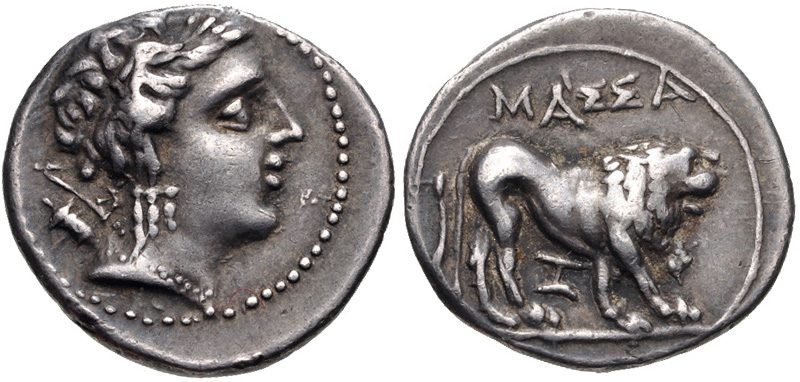
Silver tetrobol (4/6 of drachma) from Massalia. Obverse: Artemis wearing stephane. Reverse: ΜΑΣΣΑ[ΛΙΗΤΩΝ] (of Massalians), lion standing right.

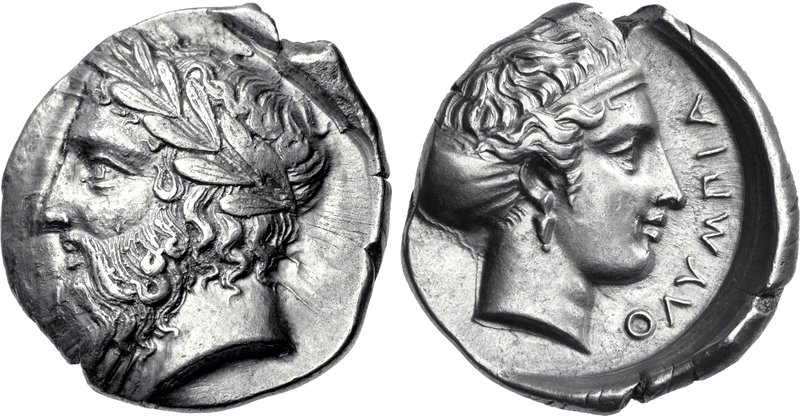
Tetradrachm from Olympia. 105th Olympiad, 360 BC. Obverse: Head of Zeus. Reverse: The nymph Olympia, inscription: ΟΛΥΜΠΙΑ.

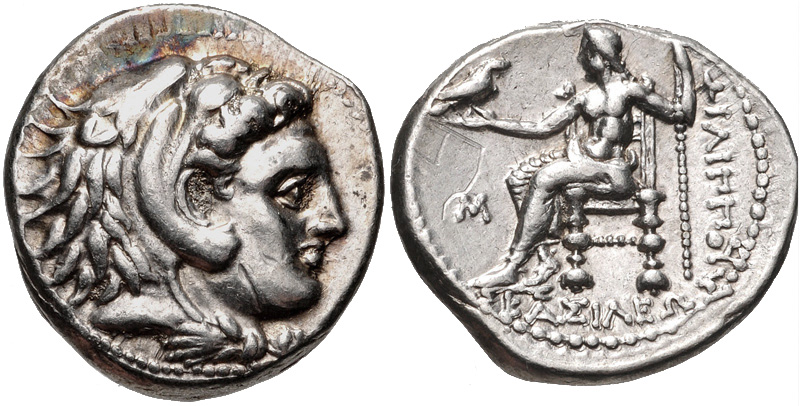
Silver Drachma of Philip III Arrhidaios, minted at Babylon. Obverse: Head of Herakles. Reverse: Zeus Aëtophoros.

== Origins ==
The name drachma is derived from the verb δράσσομαι (drássomai, "(I) grasp"). (Note: "As much as one can hold in the hand".) It is believed that the same word with the meaning of "handful" or "handle" is found in Linear B tablets of the Mycenean Pylos. (Note: The word, whose meaning and translation is still uncertain, is 𐀈𐀏𐀔, do-ka-ma or 𐀈𐀏𐀔𐀂, do-ka-ma-i, found on the PY An 1282 and PY Wr 1480 tablets.) Initially a drachma was a fistful (a "grasp") of six oboloí or obeloí (metal sticks, literally "spits") originally used for roasting lamb. There is archaeological evidence that oboloi were used as a form of currency, beginning around 1100 BC, being a form of bullion: bronze, copper, or iron ingots denominated by weight in a developed barter system. The earliest of these obeloi were found in Palaepahos, Cyprus in a Geometric grave. Anthropological arguments suggest that obeloi were used in burials of warrior elite or in the graves of people with high social status. A hoard of over 150 rod-shaped obeloi was uncovered at Heraion of Argos in Peloponnese. Six of them are displayed at the Numismatic Museum of Athens. Despite earlier evidence of poorly preserved specimen, the obeloi discovered at Argos were the first found completely intact.

The drachma was the standard unit of silver coinage at most ancient Greek mints, and the name obol was used to describe a coin that was one-sixth of a drachma. The notion that drachma derived from the word for fistful was recorded by Herakleides of Pontos (387–312 BC) who was informed by the priests of Heraion that Pheidon, king of Argos, dedicated rod-shaped obeloi to Heraion. Similar information about Pheidon's obeloi was also recorded at the Parian Chronicle.

== Characteristics ==
Ancient Greek coins normally had distinctive names in daily use. The Athenian tetradrachm was called owl, the Aeginetic stater was called chelone, the Corinthian stater was called hippos (horse) and so on. Each city would mint its own and have them stamped with recognizable symbols of the city, known as badge in numismatics, along with suitable inscriptions, and they would often be referred to either by the name of the city or of the image depicted. The exact exchange value of each was determined by the quantity and quality of the metal, which reflected on the reputation of each mint. Coins were most often made of silver, and very rarely gold.

== Geographic spread ==
Among the Greek cities that used the drachma were: Abdera, Abydos, Alexandria, Aetna, Antioch, Athens, Chios, Cyzicus, Corinth, Ephesus, Eretria, Gela, Catana, Kos, Maronia, Naxos, Pella, Pergamum, Rhegion, Salamis, Smyrni, Sparta, Syracuse, Tarsus, Thasos, Tenedos, Troy and more. Most coins only circulated within the region they were created in, and there was no universal standard. However, more than half the known Greek city-states do not have evidence of minting coins.

Fractions and multiples of the drachma were minted by many states, most notably in Ptolemaic Egypt, which minted large coins in gold, silver and bronze.

Notable Ptolemaic coins included the gold pentadrachm and octadrachm, and silver tetradrachm, decadrachm and pentakaidecadrachm. This was especially noteworthy as it would not be until the introduction of the Guldengroschen in 1486 that coins of substantial size (particularly in silver) would be minted in significant quantities.

After Alexander's conquests, the name drachma was used in many of the Hellenistic kingdoms in the Middle East, including the Ptolemaic kingdom in Alexandria and the Parthian Empire based in what is modern-day Iran. The Arabic unit of currency known as dirham (Arabic: درهم), known from pre-Islamic times and afterwards, inherited its name from the drachma or didrachm (δίδραχμον, 2 drachmae); the dirham is still the name of the official currencies of Morocco and the United Arab Emirates. The Armenian dram (Armenian: Դրամ) also derives its name from the drachma.

=== Athenian coinage ===
The 5th century BC Athenian tetradrachm ("four drachmae") coin featured the helmeted profile bust of Athena on the obverse (front) and an owl on the reverse (back). In daily use they were called γλαῦκες glaukes (owls), hence the proverb Γλαῦκ' Ἀθήναζε, 'an owl to Athens', referring to something that was in plentiful supply, like 'coals to Newcastle'. The reverse is featured on the national side of the modern Greek 1 euro coin.

The tetradrachm ("four drachmae") coin was perhaps the most widely used coin in the Greek world prior to the time of Alexander the Great (along with the Corinthian stater). Athenian coinage was especially attractive due to the purity of the silver used to create each coin. At the time, to gain legitimacy over a large geographic spread, city states relied on the intrinsic value of their coins and the promise that "its minting authority would redeem it". Athens demonstrated both. Athenian coinage was one of the few coins accepted internationally. The popularity of Athen's coinage can be contributed to numerous laws restricting local traders to exclusive use of Athenian coinage abroad. The only specific coinage mentioned in Herodotus is the drachma of Athens.

Evidence for the usage of silver coinage can be found in multiple sections of Herodotus. In 6.21 the tensions between the Athenians and Miletus result in a discussion of equal return and exchange involving coins. In Herodotus 8.93 a prize of ten thousand drachmae is offered in exchange for a prisoner.

The valuable silver used in Athenian coins was gathered from Athens's Laurium Mines in Attica, which were subject to large-scale use and exploitation beginning in the 6th century BCE. Mining was strictly overseen by the Athenian state. In Herodotus 7.144 there is specific discussion of the wealth that Athens gathered from these mines. He states, "The revenues from the mines at Laurium has brought great wealth into the Athenian's treasury."

== Usages in Ancient Greece ==
The primary function of the first coinage is highly debated by scholars. Historian Sitta von Reden states that, "The great number of possible explanations, none of which are {sic} wholly satisfactory, has made scholars abandon the question of the primary function of the first coinages." But there is some anthropological evidence for different uses of coins over time in Ancient Greece.

Most historians find consensus in the use of coinage to facilitate trade. Such use of coinage is attested to in such primary sources as Herodotus 1.94.; he says that the Lydians were the first to mint coins and use them "for retail."

Since trade was state controlled, trade and political factors are highly interlocked. Ancient coinage also had religious use. Obeloi were often used in dedications at shrines and temples. Anthropological evidence of this can be found at the Apollo sanctuary at Delphi, the Apollo temple at Halieis, and the sanctuary of Hera and Zeus at Olympia. Though debated, historians believe that the use of these items in a religious context is significant. Additionally, "penalties, tithes and other dues were inflicted on both priests and worshippers" and were extracted through bullion weight or coinage.

Many historians believe that coins were used as a tool for empire building, as a Greek City state could enforce its power and establish political order through managing its coins.

There is also historic speculation that coins were manufactured and used as a form of civic pride. Thomas R. Martin says that the use of coinage in ancient Greece, could be loosely compared to the use of flags in the modern world. Martin says that coins thus functioned "as symbols of sovereign identity"

Coinage was used for rewards at athletic games, which were an integral part of Greek life. Victors of games were often given prizes with monetary value, such as bronze and silver containers, tripods, and coins.

In daily life, coins were used for such social transactions as marriage and transfer of land, although far less is known about these exchanges. Anthropological evidence shows that marriages were events in which coins would be exchanged from one party to another. Other items received in dowry exchanges were appraised by their monetary value, measured in coins. Dowries were usually paid for in cash. For a wealthy Athenian family this could include between "500 dr and 2 talents."

== Value ==
=== Weight value ===
Drachmae were minted on different weight standards at different Greek mints. The standard that came to be most commonly used was the Athenian or Attic standard, which weighed a little over 4.3 grams.

=== Modern value and comparison ===
In the heyday of ancient Greece (the fifth and fourth centuries) the daily wage for a skilled worker or a hoplite was one drachma, and for a heliast (juror) half a drachma since 425 BC. Before the Peloponnesian War (beginning in 431), which caused significant inflation, a laborer might earn one-third of a drachma per day.

Modern commentators derived from Xenophon that half a drachma per day (360 days per year) would provide "a comfortable subsistence" for "the poor citizens" (for the head of a household in 355 BC). Earlier in 422 BC, we also see in Aristophanes (Wasps, line 300–302) that the daily half-drachma of a juror is just enough for the daily subsistence of a family of three.

It is difficult to estimate comparative exchange rates with modern currencies because the range of products produced by economies of centuries gone by were different from today. Purchasing power parity (PPP) calculations are very difficult.

An 1885 paper by William Goodwin estimated that, ignoring purchasing power, the weight of silver that had been in a Solonic talent was at that time worth approximately 877 United States dollars, making a drachma worth $0.14 in 1885 ($5.24 in 2025). However, he said that "these comparisons of the Attic talent with a fluctuating commodity like silver at the present day are, of course, highly unsatisfactory"; using an alternate method accounting for average bullion prices over some decades, he arrived at $1,000 for a talent, which means that based solely on bullion value, a drachma would have been worth $0.16 in 1885 ($5.97 in 2025).

But bullion equivalent calculations do not provide a complete picture of a currency's value. Using a labor-equivalent calculation, a silver drachma (or denarius), which constituted a day's wage for a manual laborer, would be worth approximately the same in modern currency. The United States federal minimum wage's maximum purchasing power was in 1968, when it was $1.60 ($14.81 in 2025), meaning an 8-hour shift paid $12.80 ($118.50 in 2025) Meanwhile, average yearly wages in the United States in 2022 were $77,463 ($85,223 in 2025), meaning a day's wages would be $322.76 ($355.00 in 2025).

Taking into account economic statistics around the world, a broader range of estimates is possible. According to the UNECE (United Nations Economic Commission for Europe), gross average monthly wages in 2020 ranged from $7,712.7 USD (Switzerland) to $265.10 USD (Uzbekistan); this yields a range between $385.63 ($480.00 in 2025) and $13.26 ($16.50 in 2025).

Food and clothing were expensive from a modern perspective. A gallon of olive oil cost three drachmae, while cloaks could range anywhere between five and twenty drachmae.

For the Roman successors of the drachma, see Roman provincial coins.

== Denominations of ancient Greek drachma ==
The weight of the silver drachma was approximately 4.3 grams or 0.15 ounces, although weights varied significantly from one city-state to another. It was divided into six obols of 0.72 grams, which were subdivided into four tetartemoria of 0.18 grams, one of the smallest coins ever struck, approximately 5–7 mm in diameter.

Denominations of Greek silver
Image	Denomination	Value	Weight	Greek
	Dekadrachm	10 drachmae	43 grams	Δεκάδραχμον
	Tetradrachm	4 drachmae	17.2 grams	Τετράδραχμον
	Didrachm	2 drachmae	8.6 grams	Δίδραχμον
	Drachma	6 obols	4.3 grams	Δραχμή
	Tetrobol	4 obols	2.85 grams	Τετρώβολον
	Triobol (hemidrachm)	3 obols (1/2 drachma)	2.15 grams	Τριώβολον (Note: Τριόβολον spelling variant is also attested.) (ἡμίδραχμον)
	Diobol	2 obols	1.43 grams	Διώβολον
	Obol	4 tetartemoria (1/6 drachma)	0.72 grams	Ὀβολός (ὀβελός)
	Tritartemorion	3 tetartemoria	0.54 grams	Τριταρτημόριον (τριτημόριον)
	Hemiobol	2 tetartemoria (1/2 obol)	0.36 grams	Ἡμιωβέλιον (ἡμιωβόλιον) (Note: Ἡμιοβόλιον spelling variant is also attested.)
	Trihemitetartemorion	1 1/2 tetartemorion	0.27 grams	Τριημιτεταρτημόριον
	Tetartemorion	1/4 obol	0.18 grams	Τεταρτημόριον (ταρτημόριον, ταρτήμορον)
	Hemitetartemorion	1/2 tetartemorion	0.09 grams	Ἡμιτεταρτημόριον

== Historic currency divisions ==
12 chalkoi = 1 obolus
6 oboloi = 1 drachma
70 drachmae = 1 mina (or mna), later 100 drachmae = 1 mina
60 minae = 1 Athenian Talent (Athenian standard)

Minae and talents were never actually minted: they represented weight measures used for commodities (e.g. grain) as well as metals like silver or gold.

== See also ==
- Denarius
- Dirham
- Economic history of Greece and the Greek world
- Seleucid coinage
