= Cent (currency) =

Monetary unit in many national currencies

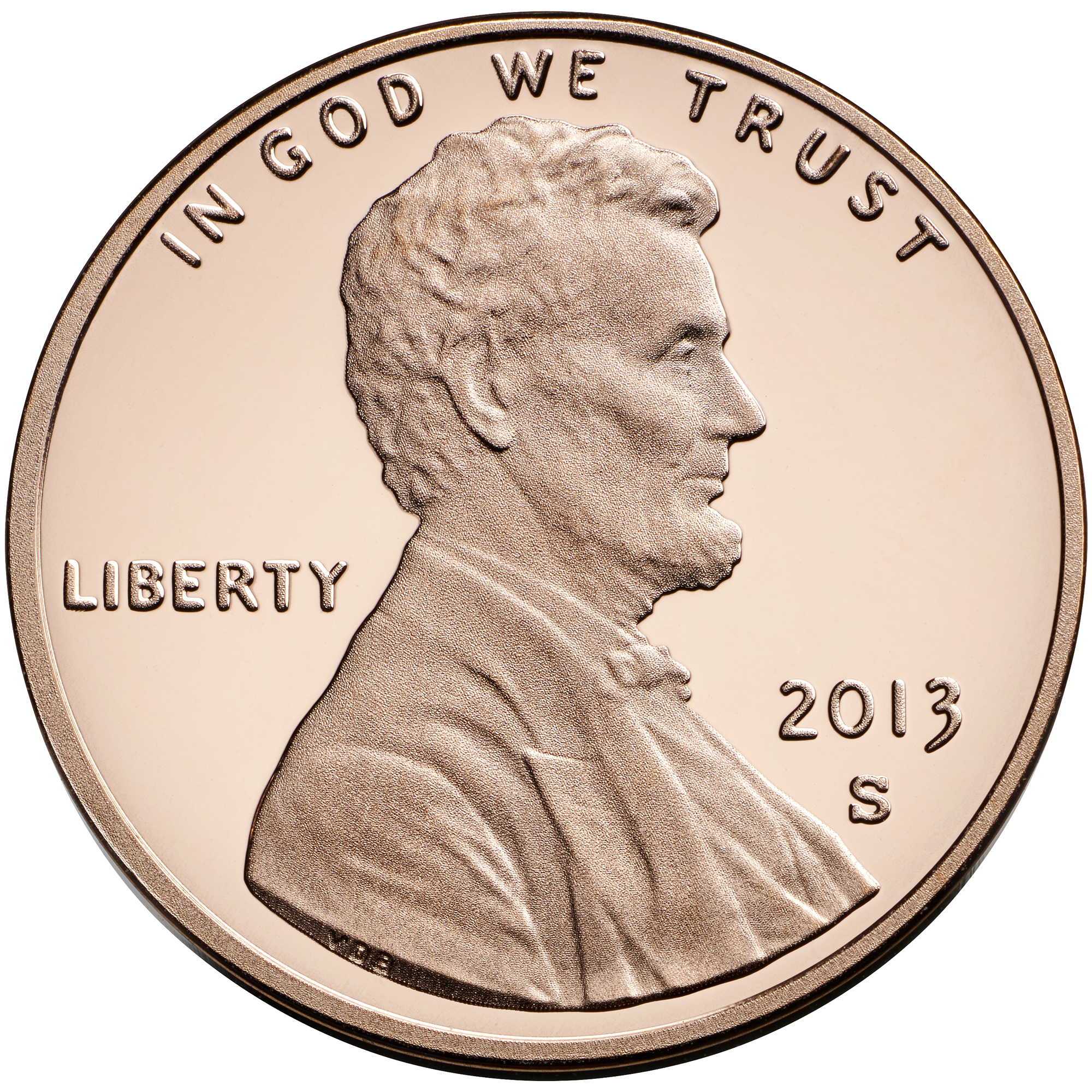
A United States one-cent coin, also known as a penny.

The cent is a monetary sub-unit of many currencies that equals a hundredth (1/100) of the currency's base unit. The word derives from the Latin centum, 'hundred'. The cent sign is commonly a simple minuscule (lower case) letter c, such as with the euro. In North America, the c is crossed by a diagonal or vertical stroke (depending on typeface), yielding the character ¢.

The United States one cent coin is generally known by the nickname "penny", alluding to the British coin and unit of that name. Australia ended production of its 1c coin in 1990. New Zealand last produced its 1c coin in 1988, as did Canada in 2012 and the US (for circulation) in 2025. Some Eurozone countries ended production of the 1 euro cent coin, most recently Slovakia in 2022.

== Symbol ==
¢ c

Cent (currency)
- In Unicode: U+00A2 ¢ CENT SIGN (&cent;); U+0063 c LATIN SMALL LETTER C

Currency
- Currency: various

Related
- See also: U+FFE0 ￠ FULLWIDTH CENT SIGN; U+3323 ㌣ SQUARE SENTO

Different from
- Different from: U+023C ȼ LATIN SMALL LETTER C WITH STROKE

The cent may be represented by the cent sign, written in various ways according to the national convention and font choice. The most commonly seen forms are a minuscule letter c crossed by a diagonal stroke, a c crossed by a vertical line, or a simple c, depending on the currency (see below). Cent amounts from 1 to 99 can be represented as one or two digits followed by the appropriate abbreviation (2¢, 5c, 75¢, 99c), or as a subdivision of the base unit ($0.75, €0.99). In some countries, longer abbreviations, like “ct.”, are used. Languages that use other alphabets have their own abbreviations and conventions.

The cent symbol has largely fallen into disuse since the mid-20th century as inflation has resulted in very few things being priced in cents in any currency. It was included on US typewriter keyboards, but has not been adopted on computers.

The CJK Compatibility Unicode block includes the character ⟨㌣⟩, a square version of セント, sento, "cent" in Japanese.

=== North American cent sign ===
The cent sign appeared as the shifted character on the 6 key of American manual typewriters, but the freestanding circumflex on computer keyboards has taken over that position.

=== Orthography ===
When written in English and Mexican Spanish, the cent sign (¢ or c) follows the amount (with no space between)—for example, 2¢ and $0.02, or 2c and €0.02. Conventions in other languages may vary. For example, in Canada, French texts add a non-breaking space between the amount and the sign: 2 ¢.

== Usage ==
East India Company half cent (1845).
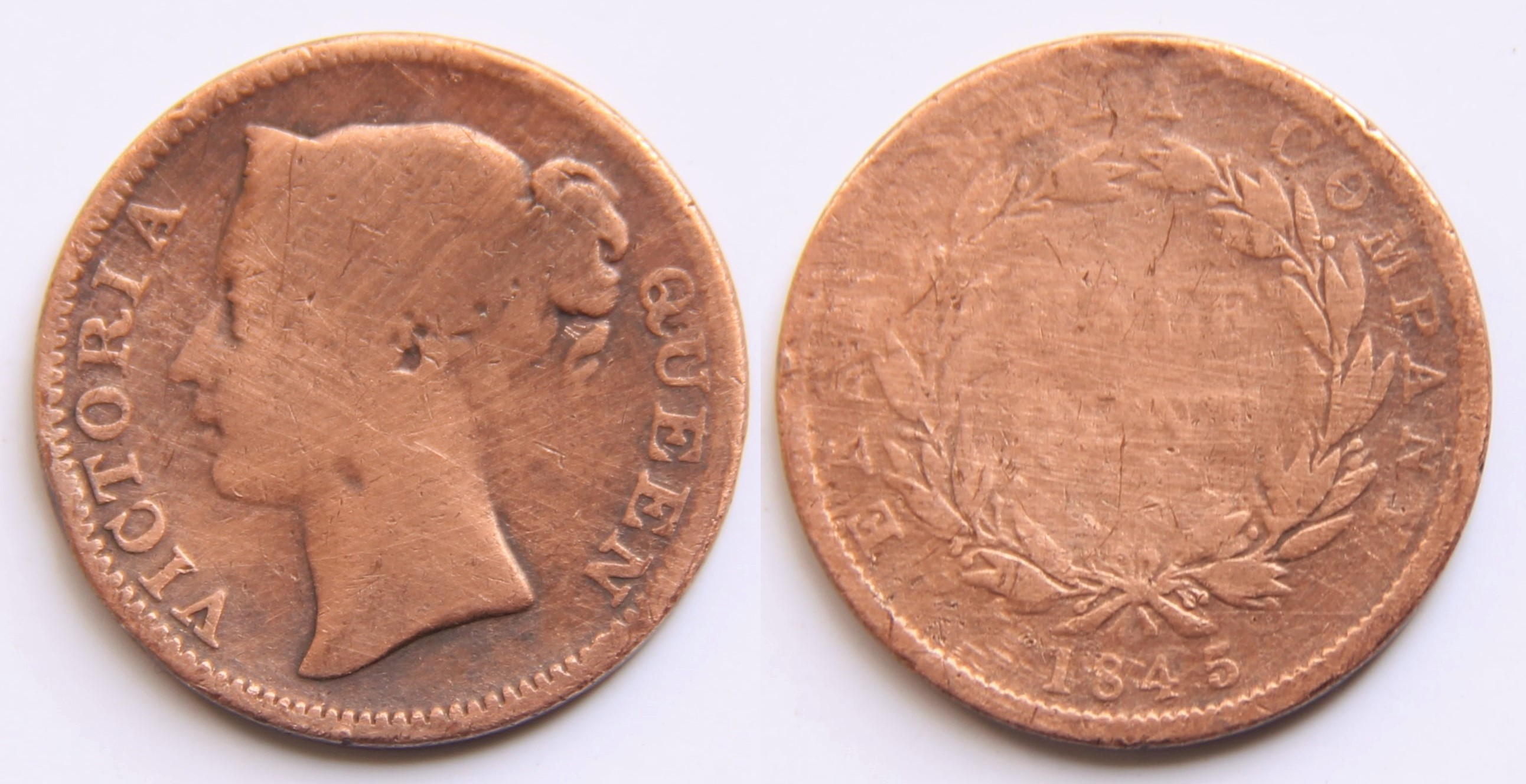
First side of the image: Obverse: Crowned head left with lettering Queen Victoria
Second side of the image: Reverse: Face value, year and "East India Company" inscribed inside wreath.
18,737,498 coins minted in 1845.

=== Minor currency units called cent or similar names ===
Examples of currencies around the world featuring centesimal (1/100) units called cent, or related words from the same root such as céntimo, centésimo, centavo or sen, are:

- Argentine peso (as centavo)
- Aruban florin, but all circulating coins are in multiples of 5 cents.
- Australian dollar, but all circulating coins are in multiples of 5 cents.
- Barbadian dollar
- Bahamian dollar, but all circulating coins are in multiples of 5 cents.
- Belize dollar
- Bermudian dollar
- Bolivian boliviano (as centavo), but all circulating coins are in multiples of 10 centavos
- Brazilian real (as centavo), but all circulating coins are in multiples of 5 centavos
- Brunei dollar (as sen)
- Cambodian riel (as sen)
- Canadian dollar
- Caribbean guilder
- Cayman Islands dollar
- Chilean peso (as centavo). The values in centavos of peso have been disregarded since the 1980s, and the 1 and 5 peso coins were withdrawn recently.
- Colombian peso (as centavo) In practice, coins below 5 pesos have not circulated since the late 1980s, and the smallest denomination currently in circulation is 50 pesos, with centavos having been discontinued since the 1980s. Although a redenomination involving the removal of three zeros from the currency has been considered, this has not yet occurred.
- Cook Islands dollar (cent, although some 50 cent coins are marked "50 tene")
- Cuban peso (as centavo)
- East Caribbean dollar, but all circulating coins are in multiples of 5 cents.
- Eritrean nakfa
- Ethiopian birr (as santim)
- Euro – the coins bear the text "euro cent".
  - Greek coins have ΛΕΠΤΟ ("lepto") on the obverse of the one-cent coin and ΛΕΠΤΑ ("lepta") on the obverse of the others.
  - Bulgarian coins have СТОТИНКА ("stotinka") on the obverse of the one-cent coin and СТОТИНКИ ("stotinki") on the obverse of the others.
  - The actual usage varies depending on the language.
- Fijian dollar
- Guyanese dollar, but there are no circulating coins with a value below one dollar.
- Hong Kong dollar, but all circulating coins are in multiples of 10 cents.
- Indonesian rupiah (as sen; the last coin minted was the 50-cent coin, in 1961; the last cent-denominated banknotes were printed in 1964 and were demonetized in 1996, save for the 1-cent note)
- Jamaican dollar, but there are no circulating coins with a value below one dollar.
- Kenyan shilling
- Lesotho loti (as sente)
- Liberian dollar
- Macanese pataca (as avo), but all circulating coins are in multiples of 10 avos.
- Malaysian ringgit (as sen), but all circulating coins are in multiples of 5 sen.
- Mauritian rupee
- Mexican peso (as centavo)
- Moroccan dirham (as santim)
- Namibian dollar
- New Zealand dollar, but all circulating coins are in multiples of 10 cents.
- Panamanian balboa (as centésimo)
- Peruvian sol (as céntimo)
- Philippine peso (as sentimo or centavo)
- Seychellois rupee
- Sierra Leonean leone
- Singapore dollar, but all circulating coins are in multiples of 5 cents.
- South African rand, but all circulating coins are in multiples of 10 cents.
- Sri Lankan rupee
- Surinamese dollar
- Swazi lilangeni
- New Taiwan dollar, but all circulating coins are in multiples of 50 cents.
- Tanzanian shilling
- Tongan paʻanga (as seniti)
- Trinidad and Tobago dollar
- United States dollar
- Uruguayan peso (as centésimo)
- Zimbabwean ZiG

=== Minor currency units with other names ===
Examples of currencies featuring centesimal (1/100) units not called cent

| Major unit | Divided into |
|---|---|
| Bhutanese ngultrum | 100 chhertum |
| Bosnia and Herzegovina convertible mark | 100 pfeniga |
| Botswanan pula | 100 thebe |
| British pound | 100 pence (singular: penny) since Decimal Day, 1971 |
| Chinese yuan | 100 fēn (分); in general usage, divided into 10 jiǎo (角). |
| Danish krone | 100 øre |
| Egyptian pound | 100 piastres |
| Gambian dalasi | 100 bututs |
| Ghanaian cedi | 100 pesewas |
| Indian rupee | 100 paise |
| Israeli new shekel | 100 agorot |
| Macau pataca | 100 avos; circulating coins are 10, 20, and 50 avos. |
| Macedonian denar | 100 deni |
| Malawian kwacha | 100 tambala |
| Mongolian tögrög | 100 möngö |
| Nepalese rupee | 100 paisa |
| Pakistani rupee | 100 paise |
| Papua New Guinean kina | 100 toea |
| Polish złoty | 100 groszy (singular: grosz) |
| Qatari riyal | 100 dirhams |
| Romanian and Moldovan leu | 100 bani |
| Russian ruble | 100 kopeks |
| Saudi riyal | 100 halalas |
| Serbian dinar | 100 paras |
| Swedish krona | 100 öre |
| Swiss franc | German: 100 Rappen; French: 100 centimes Italian: 100 centesimi Romansch: 100 raps |
| Thai baht | 100 satang |
| Turkish lira | 100 kuruş |
| United Arab Emirates dirham | 100 fils |
| Ukrainian hryvnia | 100 kopiykas |
| Zambian kwacha | 100 ngwee |

=== Obsolete centesimal currency units ===
Examples of currencies which formerly featured centesimal (1/100) units but now have no fractional denomination in circulation:

| Major unit | Formerly divided into |
|---|---|
| Costa Rican colón | 100 céntimos |
| Czech koruna | 100 haléřů |
| Hungarian forint | 100 fillér |
| Icelandic króna | 100 aurar (singular eyrir) |
| Japanese yen | 100 sen |
| Norwegian krone | 100 øre |
| South Korean won | 100 jeon |
| Swedish krona | 100 öre |
| Ugandan shilling | 100 cents |

=== Other Usages ===
Cent accounts are retail foreign exchange trading accounts whose balances are measured in cents instead of US dollars.

== See also ==
- Cent (music)
