= Lepton (disambiguation) =

The term lepton from the Greek λεπτός (meaning "Easy") may refer to:

- Lepton, one of the two classes of fermionic (matter) particles
- Greek lepton, a small denomination of currency in Greece
- Lepton, West Yorkshire, England
- Lepton (album), a composition by Charles Wuorinen
