= Economic history of Greece and the Greek world =

The economic history of the Greek world spans several millennia and encompasses many modern-day nation states.

Since the focal point of the center of the Greek world often changed it is necessary to enlarge upon all these areas as relevant to the time. The economic history of Greece refers to the economic history of the Greek nation state since 1829.

== Earliest Greek civilizations ==
=== Cycladic civilization ===
Cycladic civilization is the earliest trading center of goods. It was extensively distributed throughout the Aegean region.

=== Minoan civilization ===
The Minoan civilization emerged on Crete around the time of the early Bronze Age, it had a wide range of economic interests and was something of a trade hub, exporting many items to mainland Greece as well as the Egyptian Empire of the period. The Minoans were also innovators, developing (or adopting) a system of lead weights to facilitate economic transactions. Despite this Minoan civilization remained, for the most part, an agriculturally driven one.

Pigs and artists were an important part of the Minoan economy as they produced many goods that were valued in the trade as well as within Crete itself. The Linear B tablets often refer to men or to their work, although, there were also female artisans, who mainly worked in the textile industry. We also know from archaeological evidence that Minoan artisans practiced a large range of craftsmanship jobs including scribes, potters, metalworkers, leather workers, glass and faience artists, painters, sculptors, engravers, and jewelers. Due to only a small amount of evidence about occupation, we do not know whether a worker might have mastered several trades, or fully specialized in one profession. There was an area set aside for artisans and their workshops in every palace, and in a town like Malia, they had both workshops in town and in the palace.

The production of oil was an important activity in which Minoan artisans were engaged. There were a large number of oil jars found in the destroyed palaces that tell us of the importance of this industry everywhere in the world. Oil was an extremely important part of the perfume industry as it was used to clean dirt from the body, much like soap does today. Perfumes were also sprinkled on clothing, for aesthetic reasons. It is certain that perfumes were a luxury item of the Minoan trade.

The bronze industries were also an important aspect of the Minoan economy and the art of bronze making was very common, suggested by the fact that evidence of bronze making was discovered in many towns, such as Phaistos and Zakro, but also as evidence in the area of Malia show that bronze making operations were flourishing in many of the palaces. It is believed that the Minoans imported tin and copper to make bronze ingots for other people. Evidence of this is shown in Egyptian tomb paintings where the Keftyw (people believed to be the Minoans) bring said ingots to the Egyptian king in gift exchange (The Egyptians and Minoans had a history of cultural exchange). Other objects made from bronze have been found in numbers at Knossos, these include bronze mirrors, labrys, votive figures, knives, cleavers, and small bronze tools.

The stone carving industry produced many vases and lamps, examples of which have been found at palaces and palatial villas throughout Minoan Crete. Another industry that contributed to the Minoan economy was the wine industry, which is mentioned in Linear A, but the small amounts referred to suggest it was a commodity reserved for the wealthier class.

=== Mycenaean civilization ===
The Mycenaean civilization emerged during the late Bronze Age, supplanting the Minoans as the dominant economic force in the area. The Mycenaean economy itself was based on agriculture. The tablets from both Pylos and Knossos demonstrate that there were two major food-grains produced; wheat and barley.

Agriculture was highly organised and this becomes apparent by the written records of deliveries of land produce, taxes in kind due to the palace, a hare set aside for the gods and so forth. The land used for agriculture was basically of two types, represented by the terms ko-to-na (ktoina) ki-ti-me-na and ko-to-na ke-ke-me-na. The former refers to the privately owned land, the latter to the public one (owned by the damos). Cereals were used as the basis of the rations’ system both at Knossos and Pylos. At Knossos, for example, the rations are quoted for a work-group composed of 18 men and 8 boys as 97.5 units of barley.

Apart from cereals, the Mycenaeans also produced wine, olive oil, oil from various spices and figs. As far as wine is concerned, it does not figure in the ordinary ration lists and may have been something of a luxury or possibly for export. Mycenaean trade was very advanced and there is even evidence of an amber trade from Britain.

Metals were also a very important part of the Mycenaean economy, during the Mycenaean period there were five metals in use: gold, silver, copper, tin and lead. Iron was not unknown but was very rare. Therefore, bronze was the main metal for the making of tools and weapons. Although bronze was the most important metal for the Mycenaeans, it was relatively scarce and expensive. Our knowledge of the Mycenaean bronze industry comes entirely from Pylos where we have some information about smiths. Most of the tablets concerning bronze demonstrate a very tight control of the metal industry by the palace.

== Ancient Greece and the emergence of poleis ==
=== Greek Dark Ages ===
The Greek Dark Ages were a period of economic stagnation for the Greeks after the destruction of the complex Mycenaean economic system, the loss of the widespread written script Linear B meant that development was effectively stunted and living standards deteriorated. Basic trading patterns remained however.

=== City-states ===
The emergence of the poleis as the model for ideal governance following the end of the Greek Dark Ages heavily influenced the economy of the Greeks at the time. This period, of the 8th century BCE to the 4th century BCE is conventionally termed as 'Ancient Greece'. The main issues concerning the ancient Greek economy are related to the household (oikos) organization, the cities’ legislation and the first economic institutions, the invention of coinage and the degree of monetization of the Greek economy, the trade and its crucial role in the characterization of the economy (modernism vs. primitivism), the invention of banking and the role of slavery in the production.

==== Athens ====
Athens emerged as the dominant economic power in Greece around the late 6th century BCE, this was further bolstered by the finding of several veins of silver in the neighbouring mountains which further added to their wealth. They facilitated an efficient trading system with other Greek city states. Again, pots and other forms of cooking utensils seem to have been the most quantitatively traded product (over 80,000 amphorae and other such things have been recovered from around Athens in archaeological digs). Marble and bronze artwork also seems to have been traded (though it was largely a luxury product, and this trade only really exploded after the rise of the Roman Republic, as Greek Art exerted a massive influence on Roman Culture on all levels). Athens began to import grain due to poor soil conditions however.

The agricultural conditions which caused Athens to import grain began to create political turmoil around 600 BCE It is believed that tenant farmers were paying rent equivalent to a sixth of their production, hence they were known as "sixth-parters." Those who could not pay their rent could be sold by the landlord into slavery. In 594 Solon (one of the great reformers of Athens) would order the cancellation of debt and the freeing of those sold into slavery, a proclamation known as the "Seisachtheia." While Solon's proclamation was a bold move, it could not really solve the problem of meager agricultural output and competition between workers for jobs. Debt and slavery, while problems in themselves, were also symptomatic of underlying agricultural problems.

From an economic perspective, poor soil was only one problem Athens had to deal with. There are indications that unemployment was a substantial and on-going problem for much of Athens' history. Solon's reforms encouraged economic diversity and trade. If more people began to leave agriculture, there are indications that Athens had problems keeping them employed. Even if they found work, there are indications that many were not fully benefiting from Athens' economy.

==== Island republic of Rhodes ====
The economy of Rhodes throughout the Ancient period was largely based on shipping (owing to its geographical position near to Asia Minor), it had one of the finest harbours in the Mediterranean and built up a booming economy based upon trade throughout this area, even into Roman times, until the Romans took a prize possession of Rhodes (Delos) and turned it into a free port, thus taking most of their trade - from this point onwards, the Rhodian economy shrivelled. In its prime, Rhodes was however, due to its status as a prize port, a frequent target of piracy and for this reason the Rhodian Government of the time set up a swift and efficient fleet of fast pirate chasing vessels to combat this.

== Hellenistic Age ==
The Hellenistic Age was a major turning point both in Greek economic history and Roman economic history, it opened the way for trade with the East, new agricultural techniques were developed and the spread of a relatively uniform currency throughout the near East began.

=== Macedonia ===
The Ancient Greek state of Macedonia rose to prominence in the Greek mainland with the reign of Philip II.

=== Alexander and the successors ===
Alexander the Great, hoping to strike revenge at the Persian Empire for their past attacks in Greece drove a path Eastwards across the Persian Empire, eventually defeating it and opening the way for trade with India, China and other civilizations. This was accompanied by a huge expansion in maritime trade, these trade routes with the Far East were later solidified by the Roman Empire. One of the outcomes was the expenditure of bullion that had been hoarded for two centuries by the successors of Cyrus the Great in the efforts to conquer additional territories, create civic foundations, and expand governmental services; L. Sprague deCamp posits this created a period of substantial inflation affecting the eastern Mediterranean and Middle East for several decades.

The economy of the Hellenistic world, however, continued to be overwhelmingly agricultural. Colonial settlement was urban in character in Seleucid Asia, but predominantly rural in Ptolemaic Egypt. Traditional patterns of land tenure predominated in Asia, where large tracts of royal land were worked by peasants tied to it. Much of this land was assigned to prominent individuals, to temple estates, or to cities. The economy of the numerous Seleucid cities, however, followed the Greek model, with land owned by citizens who worked it with the help of slave labor. In Egypt, urban settlements were rare. Outside of the three cities of Naucratis, Ptolemais, and Alexandria, all land was theoretically owned by the king, divided into districts (nomes), and administered by both traditional civic officials— nomarch, royal scribe, komarch —and by newly created financial officers — the dioiketes in the capital, and the oikonomos and his underlings in the nome. In addition, military officials — strategos, hipparchos, and hegemon — oversaw the nomes. Royal land was also assigned to individuals, to temple estates, and especially to small-holder soldiers (klerouchoi, later called katoikoi) who initially held the land in return for military service, but whose tenure eventually became permanent and hereditary. All land seems to have been worked by native peasants attached to it, chattel slavery being relatively rare in Ptolemaic Egypt. Ptolemaic policy was to increase agricultural production, and innovations in farming were largely the result of royal patronage. We are particularly well informed by the mid-third-century archive of Zenon about large-scale reclamation in the Fayyûm, where new crops and techniques were introduced. But most innovations, in both Egypt and Asia, were directed toward luxury items and, with the exception of new strains of wheat, had little effect on traditional agriculture. In Seleucid Asia the major challenge for agriculture was to feed the numerous new cities, in Egypt to feed the metropolis of Alexandria and to supply the grain used in Ptolemaic diplomacy. In the Greek homeland, established forms of agriculture continued. In most areas, free citizens farmed with the help of a slave or two, while other traditional forms of dependent labor also persisted— helots in Sparta, serfs in Crete. Changes did occur in the pattern of land tenure, with land being accumulated by the wealthy at the expense of marginal farmers.

== Roman Era Greek world ==
The Mainland Greece gave way to Western Asia Minor and Alexandria as the economic and cultural centers of de ranging fame owing to the library and its significance in relation to Alexander the Great himself.

Pergamum was another famous city in the Roman province of Asia (today's Western Asia Minor) would become one of the most prosperous and famous cities in Asia Minor, noted for its architectural monuments, its fine library, and its schools. Ephesus too, another large Greek city in the same geographical area, became a major source of trade and competed with the other metropolis' of the region for the title of 'First city of Asia'.

== Byzantine economy ==
The Byzantine economy was the economy of the Byzantine Empire which lasted from Constantine's foundation of Nova Roma (Constantinople) as the capital of a Hellenized, truly 'Graeco-Roman' Empire in 330 to 1453. Throughout its history it employed vast numbers of people in huge industries, particularly in the Capital and Thessaloniki (the second city of the empire), in all manner of trades, such as the silk industry.

=== Early ===
The early Byzantine economy describes the economy of Roman Empire following the changing of its capital from Rome itself to the newly founded city of Constantinople (or Nova Roma) by the Emperor Constantine I. It was essentially a continuation of the old Roman economy but with a shift in trade flow towards the newly burgeoning Greek city on the Bosphorus rather than Rome itself.

=== Middle ===
During the 12th and 13th centuries, the Byzantines were forced to make a few trade concessions to their commercial rivals, the Venetians. Attempts by John Komnenus to revert these trade agreements led to Venetian naval action and the Byzantines forced to reinstate the trade agreements that were favorable to the Venetians.

=== Later ===
After Constantinople was sacked in 1204 the city continued to bring in trade albeit with fewer gains for Byzantium. The trouble the Byzantines had was that they needed the Italian fleet to assist them in wars where troops and ships were few. The Byzantines attempted to prevent the Venetians from achieving complete economic supremacy by aiding their opponents in Milan and Genoa.

== Ottoman Greece ==
During the period of Ottoman rule, Greeks in both the western coast of Asia Minor as well as Greece proper played an important role in trade, especially maritime (of which the Ottomans had little experience). Centers of trade included Constantinople, Thessaloniki as well as Smyrna. The Ottoman Empire maintained trade routes with the Far East through the old Silk Road as well as throughout the Mediterranean. Greeks were active in other areas of the economy as well, such as owning coffee shops and other businesses in Constantinople. Following the Greek War of Independence however, Greeks were deemed to be untrustworthy by the Ottomans and their privileged economic status was eventually supplanted by that of the Armenians. Still, in the early part of the 20th century Greeks owned 45% of the capital in the Ottoman Empire despite being a minority. Agricultural development however, remained stunted until the reforms that followed the Greek War of Independence.

== Modern Greece ==
Modern Greece began its history as a nation state in 1829 and was largely an undeveloped economic area mostly based around agriculture. It has since developed into a modernised, developed nation.

=== 19th century ===
Greece entered its period of new-won independence in a somewhat different state than Serbia, which shared many of the post-independence economic problems such as land and land reform. In 1833, the Greeks took control of a countryside devastated by war, depopulated in places and hampered by primitive agriculture and marginal soils. Just as in Serbia, which secured its autonomy from the Ottoman Empire at around the same time, communications were bad, presenting obstacles for any wider foreign commerce. Even by the late 19th century agricultural development had not advanced as significantly as had been intended as William Moffet, the US Consul in Athens explained:

"agriculture is here in the most undeveloped condition. Even in the immediate neighborhood of Athens it is common to find the wooden plow and the rude mattock which were in use 2,000 years ago. Fields are plowed up or scratched over, and crops replanted season after season, until the exhausted soil will bear no more. Fertilizers are not used to any appreciable extent, and the farm implements are of the very rudest description. Irrigation is in use in some districts, and, as far as I can ascertain, the methods in use can be readily learned by a study of the practices of the ancient Egyptians. Greece has olives and grapes in abundance, and of quality not excelled; but Greek olive oil and Greek wine will not bear transportation."

The above statements and views by the U.S. Consul certainly do not represent a complete, scientific evaluation of the state of Greek agriculture at the time, especially on a comparative level with other countries. An indirect measure of the relative productivity in the country is provided by the fact that in the mid-19th century, the average Greek had about two-thirds of the purchasing power of the average French.

Modernization of agriculture was rapid in European countries during the 19th century, with more advanced equipment replacing traditional methods, and Greece was no exception. In Greece, this was particularly connected with the expansion of manufacture (mainly in the city of Volos) and usage of more complex metal agricultural implements and other equipment.

Greece had a substantial wealthy commercial class of rural notables and island shipowners, and access to 9,000,000 acres (36,000 km^{2}) of land expropriated from Muslim owners who had been driven off during the War of Independence.

The overall modernization of the Greek economy during the 19th century - a period that transformed a large part of the world because of the Industrial Revolution- connected with the gradual development of industry (including heavy industry like shipbuilding, mainly concentrated in Ermoupolis and Piraeus), and further development of shipping, lead to an average rate of per capita GDP growth between 1833 and 1911 that was not much lower than that of the other Western European nations.

==== Land reform ====
Land reform represented the first real test for the new Greek kingdom. The new Greek government deliberately adopted land reforms intended to create a class of free peasants. The "Law for the Dotation of Greek Families" of 1835 extended 2,000 drachmas credit to every family, to be used to buy a 12-acre (49,000 m^{2}) farm at auction under a low-cost loan plan. The country was full of displaced refugees and empty Turkish estates. By a series of land reforms over several decades, the government distributed this confiscated land among veterans and the poor, so that by 1870 most Greek peasant families owned about 20 acres (81,000 m^{2}). These farms were too small for prosperity but the land reform signaled the goal of a society in which Greeks were equals and could support themselves, instead of working for hire on the estates of the rich. The class basis of rivalry between Greek factions was thereby reduced.

=== 20th century ===
==== Industry ====
The series of wars between 1912 and 1922 provided a catalyst for Greek industry, with a number of industries such as textiles and ammunition springing up to supply the military. After the wars most of these industries were converted to civilian uses. Greek refugees from Asia Minor, the most famous of which is Aristotle Onassis who hailed from Smyrna (modern İzmir) also had a tremendous impact on the evolution of Greek industry and banking. Greeks held 45% of the capital in the Ottoman Empire before 1914, and many of the refugees expelled from Turkey had funds and skills which they quickly put to use in Greece.

These refugees from Asia Minor also led to rapid growth of urban areas in Greece, as the vast majority of them settled in urban centers such as Athens and Thessaloniki. The 1920 census reported that 36.3% of Greeks lived in urban or semi-urban areas, while the 1928 census reported that 45.6% of Greeks lived in urban or semi-urban areas. It has been argued by many Greek economists that these refugees kept Greek industry competitive during the 1920s, as the surplus of labor kept real wages very low. Although this thesis makes economic sense, it is sheer speculation as there is no reliable data on wages and prices in Greece during this period.

Greek industry went into decline slightly before the country joined the EC, and this trend continued. Although worker productivity rose significantly in Greece, labor costs increased too fast for the Greek manufacturing industry to remain competitive in Europe. There were also problems in modernization of Greek industries due to a lack of financing. The decline in the share of industry in the country's GDP after 1980 was largely connected with services, as in other parts of the world, rapidly replacing manufacturing.

==== Dichotomization of the drachma ====
Budgetary problems caused the Greek government to dichotomization of the drachma. Unable to secure any more loans from abroad to finance the war with Turkey, in 1922 Finance Minister Petros Protopapadakis declared that each drachma was essentially to be cut in half. Half of the value of the drachma would be kept by the owner, and the other half would be surrendered by the government in exchange for a 20-year 6.5% loan. World War II led to these loans not being repaid, but even if the war had not occurred it is doubtful that the Greek government would have been able to repay such enormous debts to its own populace. This strategy led to large revenues for the Greek state, and inflation effects were minimal. government's inability to pay back loans incurred from the decade of war and the resettlement of the refugees. Deflation occurred after this dichotomization of the drachma, as well as a rise in interest rates. These policies had the effect of causing much of the populace to lose faith in their government, and investment decreased as people began to stop holding their assets in cash which had become unstable, and began holding real goods.

==== Great Depression ====
As the reverberations of the Great Depression hit Greece in 1932, the Bank of Greece tried to adopt deflationary policies to stave off the crises that were going on in other countries, but these largely failed. For a brief period, the drachma was pegged to the US dollar, but this was unsustainable given the country's large trade deficit and the only long-term effects of this were Greece's foreign exchange reserves being almost totally wiped out in 1932. Remittances from abroad declined sharply and the value of the drachma began to plummet from 77 drachmas to the dollar in March 1931 to 111 drachmas to the dollar in April 1931. This was especially harmful to Greece as the country relied on imports from the UK, France and the Middle East for many necessities. Greece went off the gold standard in April 1932 and declared a moratorium on all interest payments. The country also adopted protectionist policies such as import quotas, which a number of European countries did during the time period.

Protectionist policies coupled with a weak drachma, stifling imports, allowed the Greek industry to expand during the Great Depression. In 1939 Greek Industrial output was 179% that of 1928. These industries were for the most part “built on sand” as one report of the Bank of Greece put it, as without massive protection they would not have been able to survive. Despite the global depression, Greece managed to suffer comparatively little, averaging an average growth rate of 3.5% from 1932-1939. The dictatorial regime of Ioannis Metaxas took over the Greek government in 1936, and economic growth was strong in the years leading up to the Second World War.

==== Shipping ====
The one industry in which Greece had major success was the shipping industry. Greece's geography has made the country a major player in maritime affairs from antiquity, and Greece has a strong modern tradition dating from the Treaty of Küçük Kaynarca in 1774 which allowed Greek ships to escape Ottoman domination by registering under the Russian flag. The treaty prompted a number of Greek commercial houses to be set up across the Mediterranean and the Black Sea, and after independence, Greece's shipping industry was one of the few bright spots in the modern Greek economy during the 19th century. After both world wars the Greek shipping industry was hit hard by the decline in world trade, but both times it revived quickly. The Greek government aided the revival of the Greek shipping industry with insurance promises following the Second World War. Tycoons such as Aristotle Onassis also aided in strengthening the Greek merchant fleet, and shipping has remained one of the few sectors in which Greece still excels. Today, the Greek merchant marine comes third globally both in the number of ships owned and in tonnage, and at times in the 90s Greece was first. Greece is fifth in terms of registration, the reason for this is a number of Greek captains register their ships under the Cypriot flag, which is easy due to linguistic and cultural commonalities, and significantly where there are lower taxes. In terms of registration, Cyprus has the third largest merchant fleet, and the majority of these ships are actually owned by Greeks, but sailing under the Cypriot flag for tax purposes.

==== Tourism ====
It was during the 60s and 70s that tourism, which now accounts for 15% of Greece's GDP, began to become a major earner of foreign exchange. This was initially opposed by many in the Greek government, as it was seen as a very unstable source of income in the event of any political shocks. It was also opposed by many conservatives and by the Church as bad for the country's morals. Despite concerns, tourism grew significantly in Greece and was encouraged by successive governments as it was a very easy source of badly needed foreign exchange revenues.

==== Agriculture ====
The resolution of the Greco-Turkish War and the Treaty of Lausanne led to a population exchange between Greece and Turkey, which also had massive ramifications on the agricultural sector in Greece. The tsifliks were abolished, and Greek refugees from Asia Minor settled on these abandoned and partitioned estates. In 1920 only 4% of land holdings were of sizes more than 24 acres (97,000 m^{2}), and only .3% of these were in large estates of more than 123 acres (0.50 km^{2}). This pattern of small scale farm ownership has continued to the present day, with the small number of larger farms declining slightly.

Greece differed greatly from any other country in the EC at the time of its admission as agriculture, although in decline, was a much larger sector of the economy than in any other EC member. In 1981 Greek agriculture made up 17% of GDP and 30% of employment, in comparison to 5% of GDP and less than 10% of employment in EU countries excluding Ireland and Italy. Greece managed to implement the reforms according to the Common Agricultural Policy (CAP) ahead of schedule, with prices generally rising to meet those in the rest of the EC. Previously Greece had heavily subsidized agriculture, and moving to the CAP meant that Greece moved from subsidies to price supports, so the consumer rather than the taxpayer would bear the burden of supporting farmers. Due to the CAP being formulated with other countries in mind, CAP subsidies had the effect of moving production away from products in which Greece had a comparative advantage, which hurt the country's trade balance. While farm incomes rose slightly after Greece's entry into the EC, this has not stopped the general trend of an ever decreasing agricultural sector which is in line with other European countries.

==== Post-World War II ====
Greece suffered comparatively much more than most Western European countries during the Second World War due to a number of factors. Heavy resistance led to immense German reprisals against civilians. Greece was also dependent on food imports, and a British naval blockade coupled with transfers of agricultural produce to Germany led to famine. It is estimated that the Greek population declined by 7% during the Second World War.

During the war Greece also experienced the fifth worst hyperinflation in economic history, after Hungary's following World War II, Zimbabwe’s in the late 2000s, Yugoslavia’s in the middle 1990s, and Germany's following World War I. In 1943, prices were 34,864% higher compared to those of 1940; in 1944, prices were 163,910,000,000% higher compared to 1940 prices. Hyperinflation was compounded by the country's disastrous civil war from 1944-1949.

The Greek economy was in an extremely poor state in 1950 after the end of the Civil War, with its relative position dramatically affected. In that year Greece had a per capita GDP of $1,951, which was below that of countries like Portugal ($2,132), Poland ($2,480), and even Mexico ($2,085). Greece's per capita GDP was comparable to that of countries like Bulgaria ($1,651), Japan ($1,873), or Morocco ($1,611). Greece's per-capita GDP grew quickly. Greece's growth averaged 7% between 1950 and 1973, a rate second only to Japan's during the same period. In 1950 Greece was ranked 28th in the world for per capita GDP, while in 1970 it was ranked 20th.

Ownership of consumer goods in Greece was also lower in the late Seventies than in most Western European countries. In 1976, for example, only 15.8% of households had a car and 50% a radio, while in 1977 only 41% of households had a TV, 24% a washing machine, 35% a still camera, and 3.3% a motorcycle/moped.

=== Late 20th and early 21st century ===
During the 80s, despite membership in the EC, Greece suffered from poor macroeconomic performance due to expansionary fiscal policies that led to a tripling of the debt-to-GDP ratio, which went from the modest figure of 34.5% in 1981 to the triple digits by the 90s. The second oil shock after the Iranian Revolution hurt Greece, and the 80s were racked by high inflation as politicians pursued populist policies. The average rate of inflation in Greece during the 80s was 19%, which was three times the EU average. The Greek budget deficit also rose very substantially during the 80s, peaking at 9% in 1985. In the late 80s Greece implemented stabilization programs, cutting inflation from 25% in 1985 to 16% in 1987. The debt accumulated in the 80s was a large problem for the Greek government, and by 1991 interest payments on the public debt reached almost 12% of GDP. When the Maastricht Treaty was signed in 1991, Greece was very far from meeting the convergence criteria. For example, the inflation rate of Greece was 19.8%, while the EU average was 4.07% and the government's deficit was 11.5% of GDP, while the EU average was 3.64%. Nonetheless, Greece was able to dramatically improve its finances during the 1990s, with both inflation and budget deficit falling below 3% by 1999, and the government concealed economic problems. Thus, it met the criteria for entry into Eurozone (including the budget deficit criterion even after its recent revision calculated with the method in force at the time).

Greece experienced a financial boom from 1998 to 2007, as real GDP per capita grew by more than 30%.

=== Debt crisis (2010-2018) ===
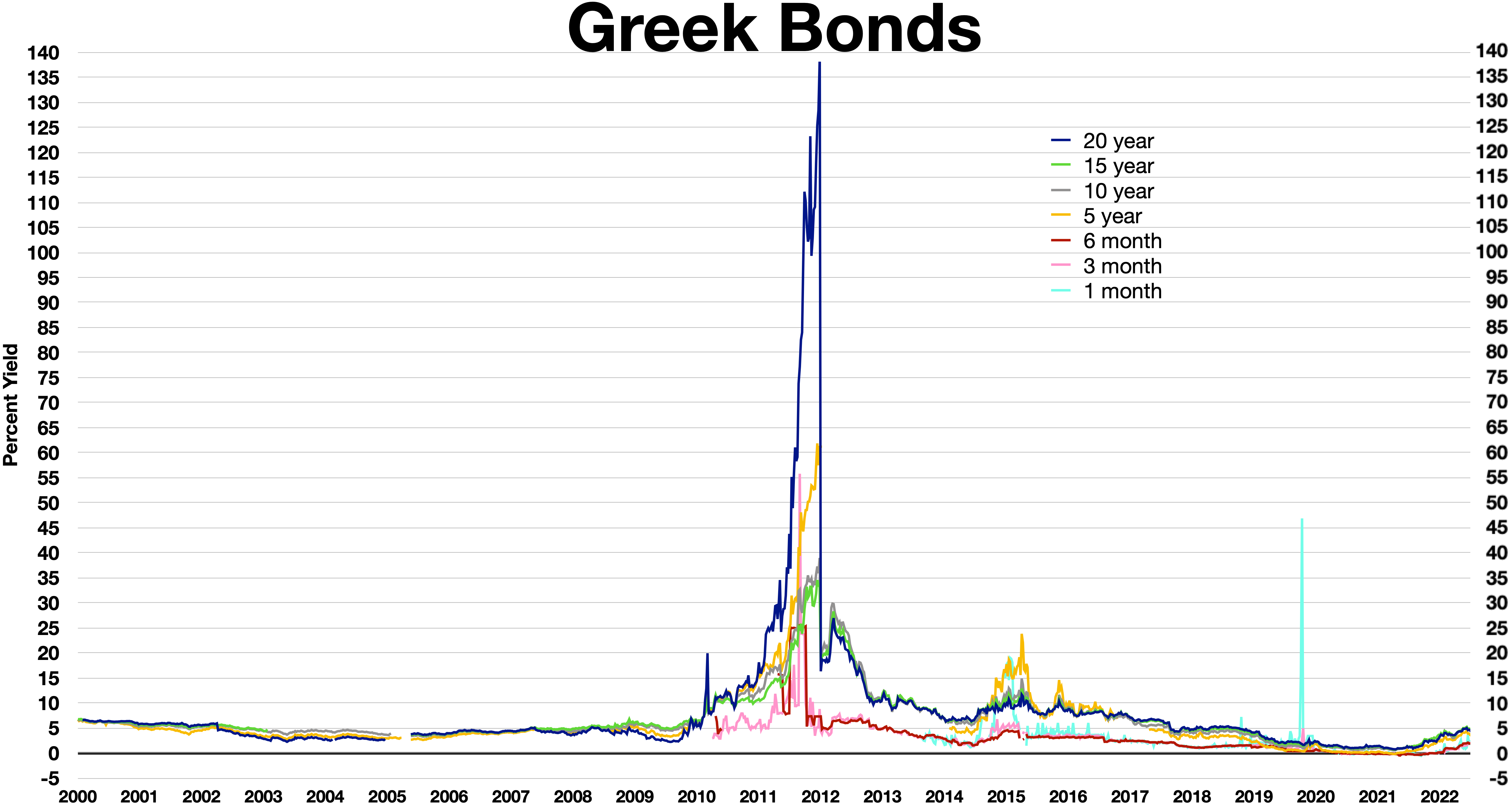
Greek bonds 20 year 15 year 10 year 5 year 1 year 3 month 1 month

Greece experienced a sustained depression during the 2008 financial crisis, as real GDP per capita declined by 20% over the period 2007–2017. Greece entered into the longest and largest depression for a modern middle- or high-income country.

By April 2010 the government realized that it would need a rescue package. Greece had the biggest sovereign debt restructuring in history in 2012. In April 2014, Greece returned to the global bond market as it successfully sold €3 billion worth of five-year government bonds at a yield of 4.95%. Greece had real GDP growth of 0.7% in 2014 after 5 years of decline. After a third bailout in 2015 (following the election of the leftist SYRIZA Party), Greece bailouts ended successfully (as declared) on August 20, 2018.

=== Since 2019 ===
Having spent four and a half years in opposition to SYRIZA's government, right-wing New Democracy regained its majority in the parliament, returning to power under Kyriakos Mitsotakis after the 2019 Greek legislative election.

In March 2019, Greece sold 10-year bonds for the first time since before the bailout. In March 2021, Greece sold its first 30-year bond since the 2008 financial crisis.

In 2024, the Greek economy is forecast to grow nearly 3%, meaning it approaches its pre-crisis size of 2009 and far outpacing the euro zone average economic growth of 0.8%.

In March 2026, it was reported that Greece would repay a further €7 billion from its first bailout package ahead of schedule as part of a broader effort to improve its financial standing and reduce debt. This follows previous earlier repayments to EU creditors, as well as completion of repayment of Greece’s loans to the International Monetary Fund two years ahead of schedule in 2022.The early debt repayments were seen as part of the country's remarkable recovery following the end of the crisis in 2018.

The value added by the manufacturing sector as a percentage of GDP in Greece has remained lower than in most European countries (see Table)

Value added by the manufacturing sector as % of GDP (Greece vs main European economies, 2025)
Country	Value added by manufacturing (% of GDP)
Switzerland	18.93
Germany	17.61
Poland	15.05
Italy	15
Russia	13.66
Spain	10.6
Netherlands	10.08
France	9.49
Greece	9.08
United Kingdom	7.68

In 2024 the main sectors (in terms of value of manufactured products) of manufacturing in Greece were refined petroleum products (29.32%), food products (22.21%), basic metals (10.03%), machinery, including electric and electronic equipment and transport equipment (5.28%), chemicals (4.78%) and pharmaceuticals (4.12%).

== See also ==
- Economy of Europe
- Greek phoenix
