= Cent accounts =

Type of financial trading accounts

Cent accounts are trading accounts within retail foreign exchange trading with balance measured in cents instead of the US dollars. Trading accounts dealing in cents are handled the same way as any US dollar account with the only difference being the nominal amounts.

== History ==
In 2006, the LiteForex company was the first in the world to offer the cent accounts. The technology of cent accounts was initially intended for developing and testing trading systems by working with real money.

== Advantage and disadvantage ==
Retail brokerage companies say that cent accounts can be useful to Forex beginners since they allow trading with real money without risking too much. Cent account balance is indicated in cents, which helps beginners get accustomed to seeing sums of many thousands on their accounts. Cent account is a kind of a transitional stage between demo and dollar accounts being a first step into a real trading, an opportunity to decrease the minimum available position size to 0.0001 of a standard lot. There is no minimum or maximum deposit and no other specific requirements to open a cent account.

The disadvantage of cent accounts is that the majority of Forex brokers offering such a service limit the maximum account and position size to keep the usage down to a minimum. Also, the cent accounts are associated with higher quote spreads to compensate brokers.
