= Greek euro coins =

Designs of Greek currency

Greek euro coins feature a unique design for each of the eight coins. They were all designed by Georgios Stamatopoulos with the minor coins depicting Greek ships, the middle ones portraying famous Greeks and the two large denominations showing images of Greek history and mythology. All designs feature the 12 stars of the EU, the year of imprint and a tiny symbol of the Bank of Greece. Uniquely, the value of the coins is expressed on the national side in the Greek alphabet, as well as being on the common side in the Roman alphabet. The euro cent is known as the lepto (λεπτό; plural lepta, λεπτά) in Greek, a name which has also been used for the 1/100 denominations of the preceding currencies of the Greek state, the phoenix and drachma.

Greece did not enter the Eurozone until 2001 and was not able to start minting coins as early as the other eleven member states, so a number of coins circulated in 2002 were not minted in Athens but in Finland (€1 and €2 – mint mark S), France (1c, 2c, 5c, 10c and 50c – mint mark F) and Spain (20c – mint mark E). The coins minted in Athens for the euro introduction in 2002, as well as all the subsequent Greek euro coins, carry only the Greek mint mark.

== Greek euro design ==
For images of the common side and a detailed description of the coins, see euro coins.

Depiction of Greek euro coinage | Obverse side
€0.01	€0.02	€0.05
An Athenian trireme of the 5th century BC	A corvette of the early 19th century	A modern tanker, symbol of Greek enterprise
€0.10	€0.20	€0.50
Rigas Feraios, Greek writer and revolutionary	Ioannis Kapodistrias, First Governor of Greece	Eleftherios Venizelos, Former Greek Prime Minister
€1.00	€2.00	€2 Coin Edge
		The words Hellenic Republic in Greek script (ΕΛΛΗΝΙΚΗ ΔΗΜΟΚΡΑΤΙΑ)
Picture of a 5th-century BC Athenian tetradrachm (a coin in a coin)	The abduction of Europa by Zeus in the form of a bull	The words Hellenic Republic in Greek script (ΕΛΛΗΝΙΚΗ ΔΗΜΟΚΡΑΤΙΑ)

== Circulating mintage quantities ==
The following table shows the mintage quantity for all Greek euro coins, per denomination, per year.

Face Value	€0.01	€0.02	€0.05	€0.10	€0.20	€0.50	€1.00	€2.00
2002	100,940,000	175,940,000	210,940,000	138,940,000	208,940,000	92,940,000	61,440,000	75,340,000
2002 EFS	15,000,000	18,000,000	90,000,000	100,000,000	120,000,000	70,000,000	50,000,000	70,000,000
2003	35,100,000	9,400,000	650,700	500,700	700,700	600,700	11,600,000	450,700
2004	49,970,000	24,970,000	220,000	9,970,000	470,000	470,000	9,970,000	s
2005	14,950,000	14,950,000	950,000	24,950,000	950,000	950,000	9,950,000	950,000
2006	44,950,000	44,950,000	49,950,000	44,950,000	950,000	950,000	9,950,000	950,000
2007	60,030,000	25,000,000	55,000,000	60,040,000	950,000	950,000	24,170,000	s
2008	24,000,000	68,000,000	50,000,000	40,000,000	20,000,000	10,000,000	4,000,000	1,000,000
2009	49,975,000	15,975,000	37,975,000	45,975,000	23,975,000	6,975,000	17,975,000	975,000
2010	27,000,000	31,000,000	5,000,000	5,000,000	12,000,000	6,000,000	11,000,000	1,000,000
2011	35,000,000	47,000,000	34,000,000	36,000,000	1,000,000	7,000,000	1,000,000	s
2012	48,000,000	34,000,000	5,000,000	s	s	s	s	s
s Small quantities minted for sets only

== Greek starter kit ==
In 2001, the Bank of Greece issued starter kits for the introduction of the Euro.

== Identifying marks ==
National Identifier	None yet
Mint Mark	
Engravers Initials	ΓΣ
€2 Edge inscription	

== €2 commemorative coins ==
Year	Subject	Volume

== Other commemorative coins (collectors' coins) ==
Greece has a good collection of euro commemorative coins, mainly in silver although a few coins have also been minted in gold. Their face value range from €10 to €200. This is mainly done as a legacy of an old national practice of minting gold and silver coins. These coins are not really intended to be used as means of payment, so generally they do not circulate. Here you can find some samples:

Gold, 200 euro, 75th anniversary of Bank of Greece (2003)

Silver, 10 euro, Patras European Capital of Culture (2006)

Silver, 10 euro, Acropolis Museum (2008)

50th Anniversary of the Signature of the Treaty of Rome (2007)
