= Lesson of the widow's mite =

Biblical teaching by Jesus on charity

A bronze mite, also known as a Prutah or Lepton (meaning small), minted by Alexander Jannaeus, King of Judaea, 103–76 BC and still in circulation at the time of Jesus

The lesson of the widow's mite or the widow's offering is presented in two of the Synoptic Gospels (Mark 12:41–44 and Luke 21:1–4), when Jesus is teaching in the Temple in Jerusalem. The Gospel of Mark specifies that two mites (Greek lepta) are together worth a quadrans, the smallest Roman coin. A lepton (called a Prutah in Hebrew) was the smallest and least valuable coin in circulation in Judea, worth about six minutes of an average daily wage.

== Biblical narrative ==
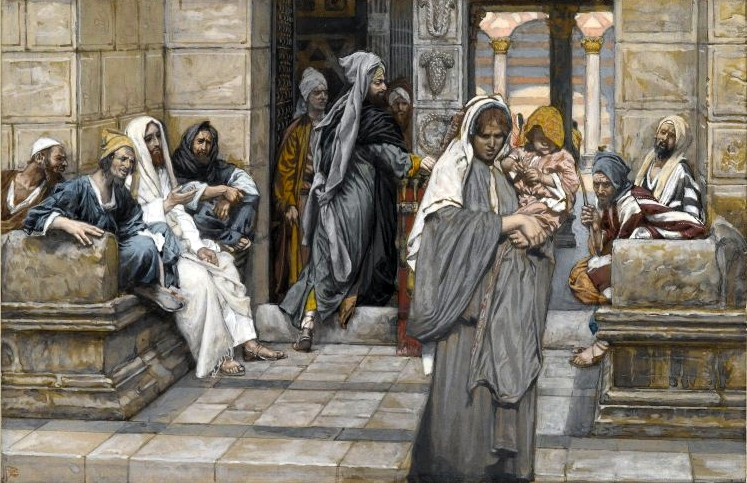
The Widow's Mite (Le denier de la veuve) - James Tissot

He sat down opposite the treasury and observed how the crowd put money into the treasury. Many rich people put in large sums. A poor widow also came and put in two small coins worth a few cents. Calling his disciples to himself, he said to them, "Amen, I say to you, this poor widow put in more than all the other contributors to the treasury. For they have all contributed from their surplus wealth, but she, from her poverty, has contributed all she had, her whole livelihood."

== Interpretation ==
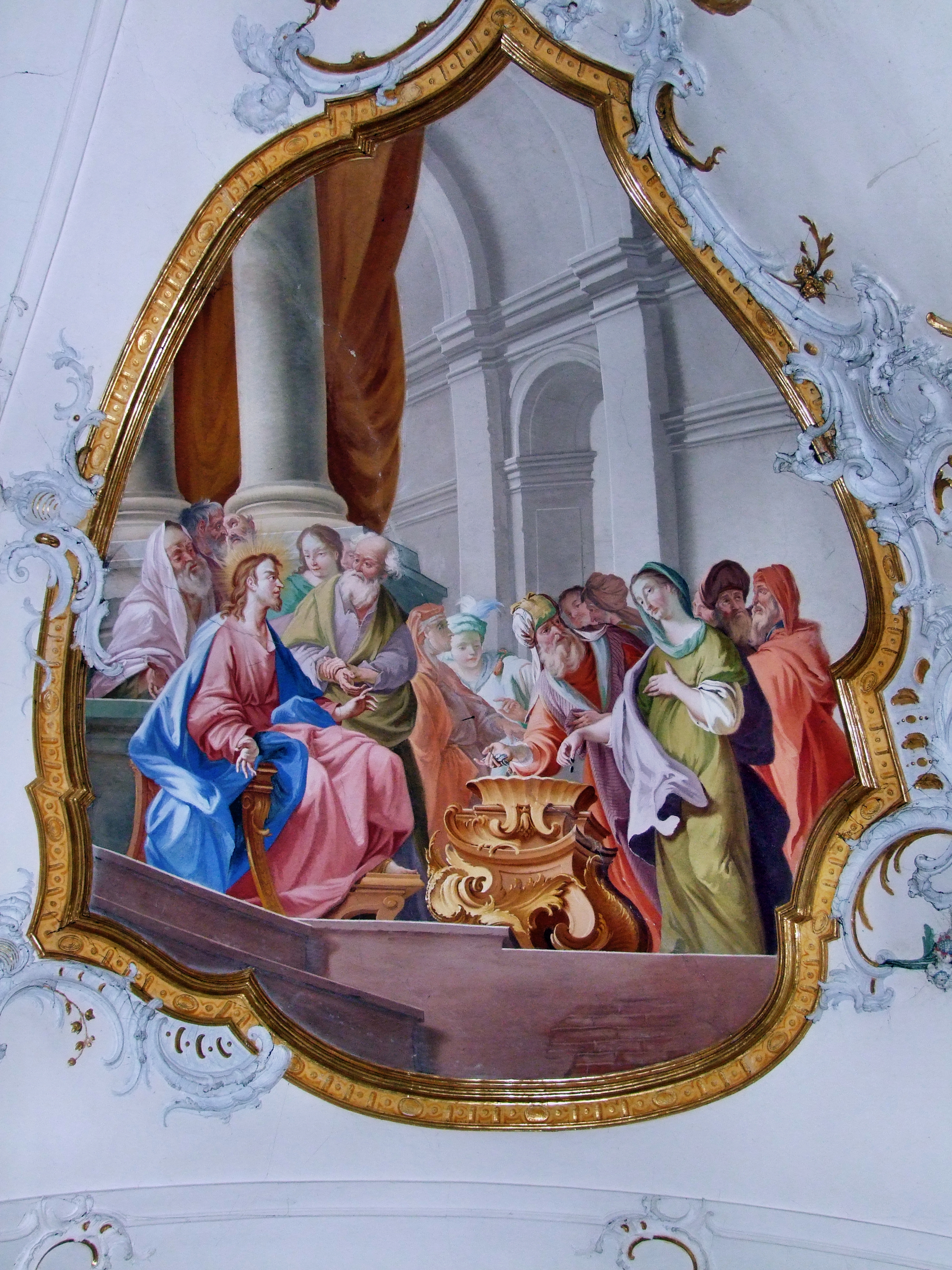
Baroque fresco at Ottobeuren

The traditional interpretation of this story tends to view it as contrasting the conduct of the scribes with that of the widow, and encouraging generous giving; it is often read with 2 Corinthians 9:7, "... for God loves a cheerful giver".

The account of the widow's offering is often used by some churches to encourage the faithful to follow her example and make large offerings, despite a precarious situation. Various theologians have criticized this interpretation. They connect this story with Jesus's condemnation of religious leaders devouring the houses of widows in the preceding verse (Gospel according to Luke, chapter 20). Thus Jesus would not have wanted to show the example of a generous donor, but rather to denounce a case of injustice.

However, Addison Wright observes that there is no indication given of the widow's demeanor or frame of mind. He points out that earlier, in Mark 7:10-13, Jesus takes to task the scribes and Pharisees for a hypocrisy that would impoverish parents.

For Moses said, "Honor your father and your mother," and "Whoever curses father or mother shall die." Yet you say, "If a person says to father or mother, 'Any support you might have had from me is qorban'" (meaning, dedicated to God), you allow him to do nothing more for his father or mother. You nullify the word of God in favor of your tradition that you have handed on. And you do many such things.

In the passage immediately prior to Jesus taking a seat opposite the temple treasury, he is portrayed as condemning religious leaders who feign piety, accept honor from people, and steal from widows. "Beware of the scribes, who like to go around in long robes and accept greetings in the marketplaces, seats of honor in synagogues, and places of honor at banquets. They devour the houses of widows and, as a pretext, recite lengthy prayers. They will receive a very severe condemnation."

The same religious leaders who would reduce widows to poverty also encourage them to make pious donations beyond their means. In Wright's opinion, rather than commending the widow's generosity, Jesus is condemning both the social system that renders her poor, and "... the value system that motivates her action, and he condemns the people who conditioned her to do it." Elizabeth Struthers Malbon concludes that Wright's interpretation is "more ingenious than convincing."

Quentin Quesnell sees in this account "... a rebuke and rejection of the wrongdoers." Quesnell notes that if Jesus's statement was to be seen as an endorsement of the widow's action, it bears none of the usual comments, such as "Go, and do likewise."

The account of the widow's mite is followed by, "As he was making his way out of the temple area one of his disciples said to him, "Look, teacher, what stones and what buildings!" Jesus said to him, "Do you see these great buildings? There will not be one stone left upon another that will not be thrown down."

Wright notes the irony that as the Temple was destroyed in the year 70, the widow's gift was not only misguided, but for nothing.

Justus Knecht gives a common moral lesson from the widow's mites:

Good Intentions. From the words of our Lord spoken in praise of the poor widow, we learn that in our good works everything depends upon the intention. The widow had given more than all the rich; for she parted with her whole fortune. She intended to give all she had to God. This was an act of perfect love and sacrifice.

== The King James Bible translation ==
In Jesus's times in Judea, the small copper coin was called a lepton; there was no coin called by the English term "mite" at that time. However, there was a mite in the time of the creation of the King James Bible, as indeed there had been at the time of earliest modern English translation of the New Testament by William Tyndale in 1525. The denomination was well known in the Southern Netherlands. Both the duke of Brabant and the count of Flanders issued them and they were sometimes imitated in the North. English poet Geoffrey Chaucer refers to the myte in his unfinished poem Anelida and Arcite (c. 1370). Originally, the Brabant mijt (maille in French) was 1/76 stuiver, the Flemish mijt 1/48 stuiver. When the two areas were united under the dukes of Burgundy and later under the Habsburgs, the rate of the mijt was set at 1/32 stuiver. More important, they were the very smallest copper coins. By 1611, they were no longer minted, but they were still in circulation.

== See also ==
- Coins of the Bible
- Greek lepton
- Mite box
- My two cents
- Tithe
