= Modern drachma =

Currency of Greece from 1832 to 2002

Greek drachma
ελληνική δραχμή (Greek)
- Modern drachma coins; Top row, left to right: 10λ coin, 20λ coin, 50λ coin, 1 δρ. coin, 2 δρ. coin. Middle row, left to right: 5 δρ. coin, 10 δρ. coin, 20 δρ. coin, 50 δρ. coin. Bottom row, left to right: 100 δρ. coin, 500 δρ. coin.

ISO 4217
- Code: GRD

Units of account
- Plural: English: drachmas or drachmae (archaic); Greek: δραχμές drachmes; until 1982: δραχμαί drachmai
- Symbol: ₯ (δρ. or δρχ.) also Δρχ. or Δρ.
- Subunit
- 1/100: leptοn
- Plural
- leptοn: lepta
- Symbol
- leptοn: λ

Denominations
- Banknotes
- Freq. used: 50 δρ., 100 δρ., 200 δρ., 500 δρ., 1,000 δρ., 5,000 δρ., 10,000 δρ.
- Coins
- Freq. used: 5 δρ., 10 δρ., 20 δρ., 50 δρ., 100 δρ., 500 δρ.
- Rarely used: 10λ, 20λ, 50λ, 1 δρ. and 2 δρ.

Demographics
- Replaced: Phoenix
- Replaced by: Euro
- User(s): None, previously: Greece

Issuance
- Central bank: Bank of Greece
- Website: www.bankofgreece.gr
- Printer: Banknote and Securities Printing Foundation
- Mint: Banknote and Securities Printing Foundation

Valuation
- Inflation: 3.1% (2000)
- Source: Grecian.net

EU Exchange Rate Mechanism (ERM)
- Since: March 1998
- Fixed rate since: 19 June 2000
- Replaced by euro, non cash: 1 January 2001
- Replaced by euro, cash: 1 March 2002
- 1 € =: 340.750 δρ.
- This infobox shows the latest status before this currency was rendered obsolete.

The drachma (Greek: δραχμή [ðraxˈmi]) was the official currency of modern Greece from 1832 until its adoption of the euro in 2002.

== First modern drachma ==
The modern drachma was introduced in May 1832, shortly before the establishment of the Kingdom of Greece, borrowing the name of the ancient drachma. It replaced the phoenix at par. The drachma was subdivided into 100 lepta. (Note: Greek: λεπτά; plural of λεπτόν, lepton.)

=== Coins ===
The first coinage consisted of copper denominations of 1 lepton, 2 lepta, 5 lepta and 10 lepta, silver denominations of 1/4 drachma (25 lepta), 1/2 drachma (50 lepta), 1 drachma and 5 drachmas and a gold coin of 20 drachmas. The drachma coin weighed 4.5 g and contained 90% silver, with the 20 drachma coin containing 5.8 g of gold.

In 1868, Greece joined the Latin Monetary Union, and the drachma became equal in weight and value to the French franc. The new coinage issued consisted of copper coins of 1, 2, 5 and 10 lepta, with the 5- and 10-lepton coins bearing the names obolos (ὀβολός) and diobolon (διώβολον), respectively; silver coins of 20 lepta, 50 lepta, 1 drachma, 2 drachmas and 5 drachmas and gold coins of 5, 10 and 20 drachmas. (Very small numbers of 50- and 100-drachma coins in gold were also issued.)

In 1894, cupro-nickel 5-, 10- and 20-lepton coins were introduced. No 1- or 2-lepton coin had been issued since the late 1870s. Silver coins of 1 and 2 drachmas were last issued in 1911, and no coins were issued between 1912 and 1922, during which time the Latin Monetary Union collapsed due to World War I.

Between 1926 and 1930, a new coinage was introduced for the new Hellenic Republic, consisting of cupro-nickel coins in denominations of 20 lepta, 50 lepta, 1 drachma, and 2 drachmas; nickel coins of 5 drachmas; and silver coins of 10 and 20 drachmas. These were the last coins issued for the first modern drachma; none were issued for the second.

=== Notes ===
Notes were issued by the National Bank of Greece from 1841 until 1928. The Bank of Greece issued notes from 1928 until 2001, when Greece joined the Euro. Early denominations ranged from 10 to 500 drachmas. Smaller denominations (1, 2, 3 and 5 drachmas) were issued from 1885, with the first 5-drachma notes being made by cutting 10-drachma notes in half.

When Greece finally achieved its independence from the Ottoman Empire in 1828, the phoenix was introduced as the monetary unit; its use was short-lived, however, and in 1832 the phoenix was replaced by the drachma, adorned with the image of King Otto of Greece, who reigned as modern Greece's first king from 1832 to 1862. The drachma was divided into 100 lepta. In 2002 the drachma ceased to be legal tender after the euro, the monetary unit of the European Union, became Greece's sole currency.

From 1917 to 1920, the Greek government took control of issuing small change notes under Law 991/1917. During that time, the government issued denominations of 10 and 50 lepta, and 1, 2 and 5 drachmas. The National Bank of Greece introduced 1,000-drachma notes in 1901, and the Bank of Greece introduced 5,000-drachma notes in 1928.

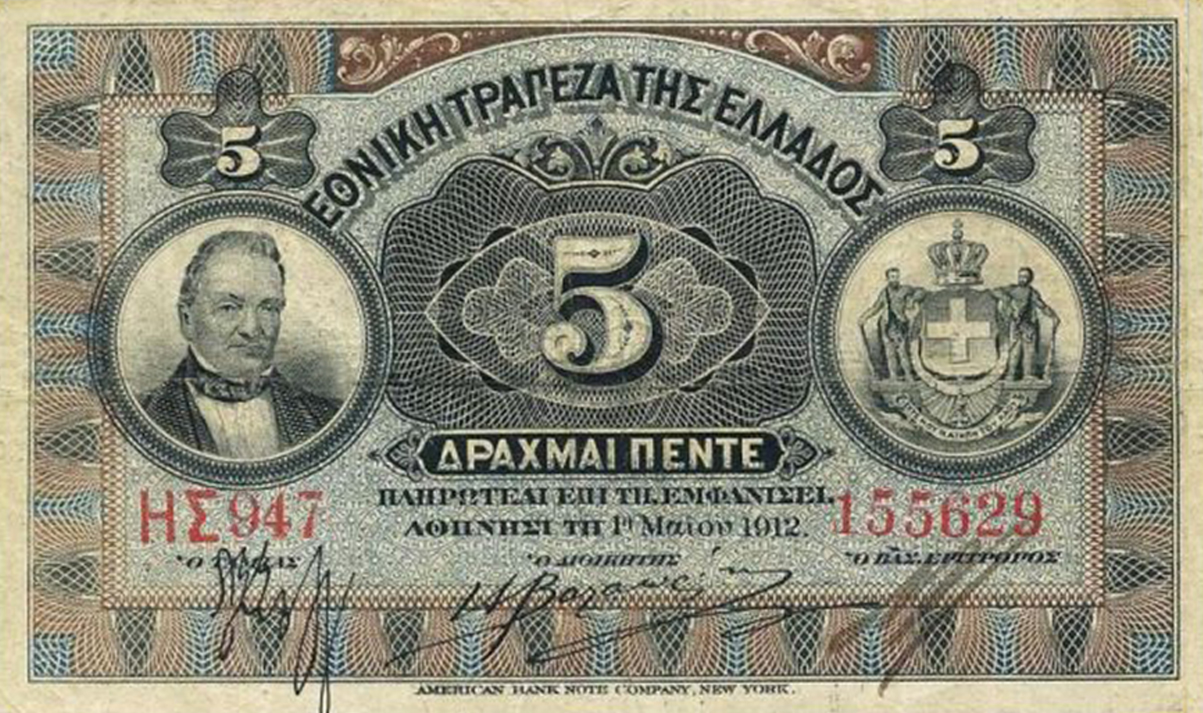
Banknote of 1912 issued by the NBG

The economic depression of the 1920s affected many nations around the globe, including Greece. In 1922, the Greek government issued a forced loan in order to finance their growing budget deficit. On 1 April 1922, the government decreed that half of all bank notes had to be surrendered and exchanged for 6.5% bonds. The notes were then cut in half, with the portion bearing the Greek crown standing in for the bonds while the other half was exchanged for a new issue of central bank notes at half the original value. The Greek government again issued notes between 1940 and 1944, in denominations ranging from 50 lepta to 20.

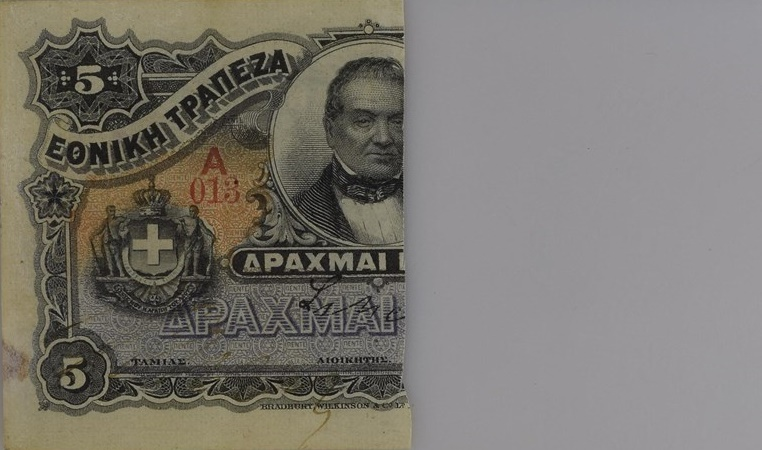
5-drachma note that has been cut in half by government for the purpose of issuing bonds

During the German–Italian occupation of Greece from 1941 to 1944, catastrophic hyperinflation caused much higher denominations to be issued, culminating in 100,000,000,000-drachma notes in 1944. The Italian occupation authorities in the Ionian Islands printed their own currency, the Ionian drachma.

Greek banknotes of the 1942–1944 inflation
Image	Pick No.	Denomination	Date Issued
	118	1,000	1942
	119	5,000	1942
	120	10,000	1942
	121	50	1943
	122	5,000	1943
	123	25,000	1943
	124	50,000	1944
	125	100,000	1944
	126	500,000	1944
	127	1,000,000	1944
	128	5,000,000	1944
	129	10,000,000	1944
	130	25,000,000	1944
	131	200,000,000	1944
	132	500,000,000	1944
2 billion drachma, 1944, Numismatic Museum of Athens	133	2,000,000,000	1944
	134	10,000,000,000	1944
100 billion drachmas, 1944, Numismatic Museum of Athens	135	100,000,000,000	1944

== Second modern drachma ==
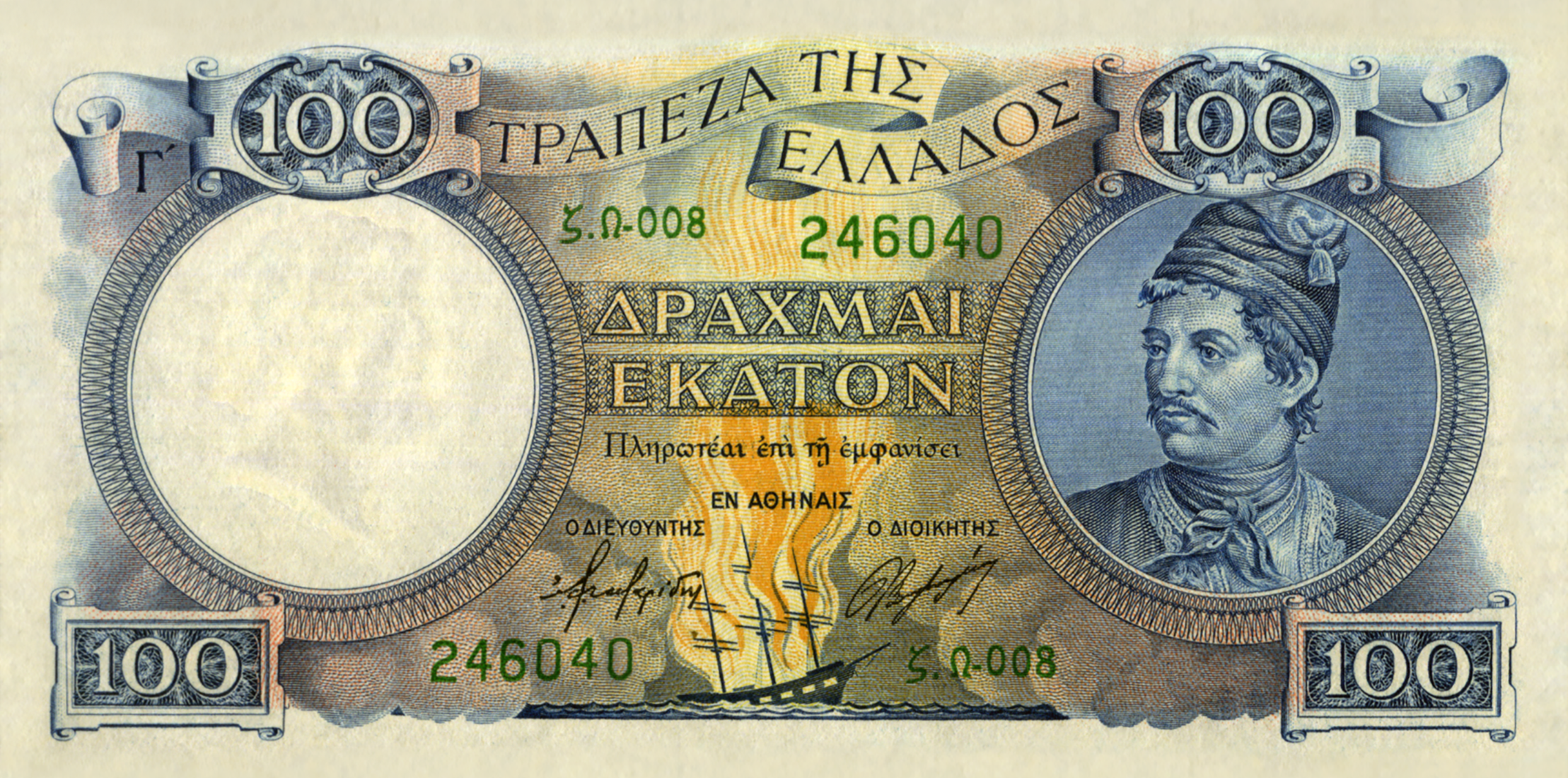
Banknote of 1944 issued by the NBG

On 11 November 1944, following the liberation of Greece from Nazi Germany, old drachma were exchanged for new ones at the rate of 50,000,000,000 old drachmas to 1 new drachma. Only paper money was issued for the second drachma. The government issued notes of 1, 5, 10 and 20 drachmas, with the Bank of Greece issuing notes of 50, 100, 500, 1,000, 5,000 and 10,000 drachmas. This drachma also suffered from high inflation. The government later issued 100-, 500- and 1,000-drachma notes, and the Bank of Greece issued 20,000- and 50,000-drachma notes.

== Third modern drachma ==
On 9 April 1953, in an effort to halt inflation, Greece joined the Bretton Woods system. On 1 May 1954, the drachma was revalued at a rate of 1,000 old drachmas to 1 new drachma, and small change notes were abolished for the last time. The third drachma assumed a fixed exchange rate of 30 drachmas per dollar until 20 October 1973: over the next 25 years, the official exchange rate gradually declined, reaching 400 drachmas per dollar. On 1 January 2002, the Greek drachma was officially replaced as the circulating currency by the euro, and it has not been legal tender since 1 March 2002.

=== Third modern drachma coins ===
The first issue of coins minted in 1954 consisted of holed aluminium 5-, 10- and 20-lepton pieces, with 50-lepton, 1-drachma, 2-drachma and 5-drachma pieces in cupro-nickel. 10-drachma coins of a brighter alloy were issued in 1959 and a silver 20-drachma piece was issued in 1960, replacing the corresponding banknotes. Coins in denominations from 50 lepta to 20 drachmas carried a portrait of King Paul (1947–1964). New coins were introduced in 1966, ranging from 50 lepta to 10 drachmas, depicting King Constantine II (1964–1974). A silver 30-drachma coin for the centennial of Greece's royal dynasty was minted in 1963. The following year a non-circulating coin of this value was produced to commemorate the royal wedding. The reverse of all coins was altered in 1971 to reflect the military junta which was in power from 1967 to 1974. This design included a soldier standing in front of the flames of the rising phoenix replacing the (royal) coat of arms and the date of the coup d'état, April 21, 1967.

A 20-drachma coin in cupro-nickel with an image of Europa on the obverse was issued in the first series of 1973, alongside unholed aluminium lepta coins (10 and 20 lepta). Following the abolition of the monarchy by the junta in June 1973, several new coin types were introduced: nickel-brass (50 lepta, 1 and 2 drachmas) and cupro-nickel (5, 10 and 20 drachmas). These coins carried the design of the phoenix rising from the flame on the obverse—but now without the soldier, a nod to the "liberalization plan" pursued by Papadopoulos—and used the country's new designation as the "Hellenic Republic", replacing the coins also issued in 1973 as the Kingdom of Greece with King Constantine II's portrait.

Following the downfall of the dictatorship, a new series of all 8 denominations was introduced in 1976 carrying images of Pericles, Democritus and Aristotle on the 20-, 10- and 5-drachma coins respectively and Georgios Karaiskakis, Konstantinos Kanaris and Markos Botsaris on the 1-drachma, 2-drachma and 50-lepton coins re,spectively. The 20- and 10-lepton coins would be the only circulating, non-commemorative coins to bear the post-1975 Coat of arms of Greece on the obverse.

Cupro-nickel 50-drachma coins were introduced in 1980, featuring Solon. Starting in 1982, all coins now bore the inscription drachmes (δραχμές) rather than the katharevousa drachmai (δραχμαί) type, reflecting the resolution of the Greek language question. In 1986, aluminium-bronze 50-drachma coins were introduced (Homer), followed by new, smaller copper 1-drachma (Laskarina Bouboulina) and 2-drachma (Manto Mavrogenous) pieces in 1988 and aluminium-bronze coins of 20 drachmas (Dionysios Solomos) and 100 drachmas (Alexander the Great) in 1990. In 2000, a set of six themed 500-drachma coins was issued to commemorate the 2004 Athens Olympic Games.

==== Subdivision ====
5-lepton coins were discontinued in the first series of 1973. 10- and 20-lepton coins were last minted in 1978, and the 50-lepton (half drachma) coin was last minted in 1986. By 1990, the lepton as a subdivision had become practically obsolete, and the drachma itself was now used for small change—the prices of sundries were in the hundreds; its size and weight had been reduced in 1988 from 21 mm, 4.1 grams to 20 mm, 2.75 grams. The 2-drachma coin experienced similar changes.

Coins in circulation at the time of the adoption of the euro were

- 50 lepta (€0.0015) (Note: Minted but rarely used. Usually, prices were rounded up to the next multiple of 10 drachmes.)
- 1 drachma (€0.0029) (Note: Not minted but remained legal tender (not in actual use in 2002).)
- 2 drachmas (€0.0059)
- 5 drachmas (€0.0147)
- 10 drachmas (€0.0293)
- 20 drachmas (€0.0587)
- 50 drachmas (€0.147)
- 100 drachmas (€0.293)
- 500 drachmas (€1.47)

Up until the introduction of the euro, the Greek government did not attempt to redenominate the drachma (to a simple 100 old drachmas = 1 new drachma rate), which could have contributed to a smoother transition to the new currency. The transition proved challenging because the exchange rate (340.75 to 1 euro) included lepta, even though they were not used in physical transactions. Additionally, the 20- and 50-cent coins (also known as “lepta”) were very similar in size and composition (Nordic gold) to the 20-, 50-, and 100-drachma coins. Initially, these lepta coins were considered worthless, similar to the “pp” of their drachma predecessors. This practice allowed vendors to take advantage of psychological pricing. The most obvious example is the retail price of a 500ml bottle of water: once costing 50 drachmas (€0.147 in 2002), the price was driven by inflation to 100 drachmas (€0.293); but the introduction of the euro would increase the price to 0.50 euros, where it stands to date.

=== Gallery ===
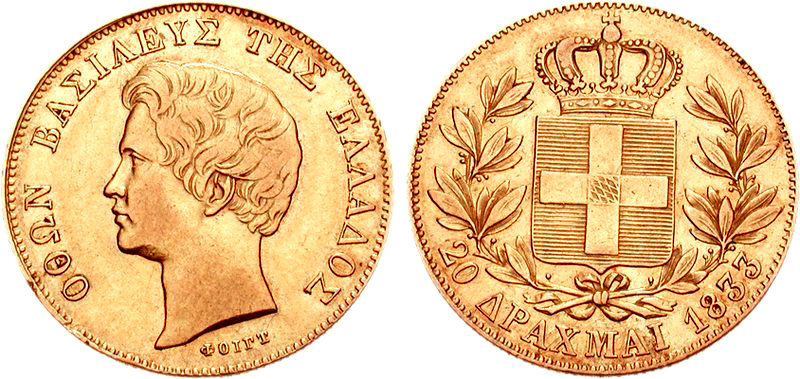
Gold 20-drachma coin depicting king Othon I, 1833

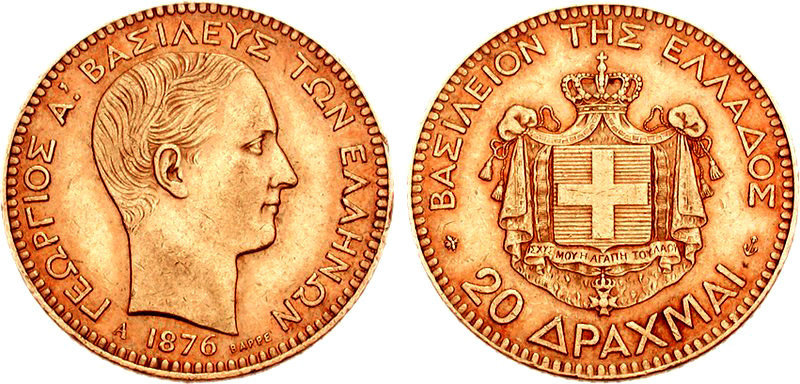
Gold 20-drachma coin depicting king Georgios I, 1876

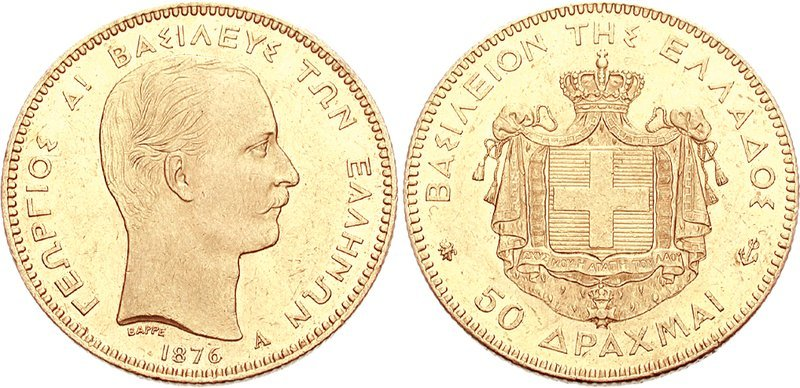
Gold 50-drachma coin depicting king Georgios I, 1876

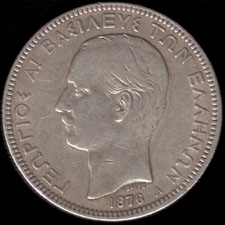
5-drachma coin, 1876

1-drachma coin during the 1973–1974 military controlled Republic, 1973

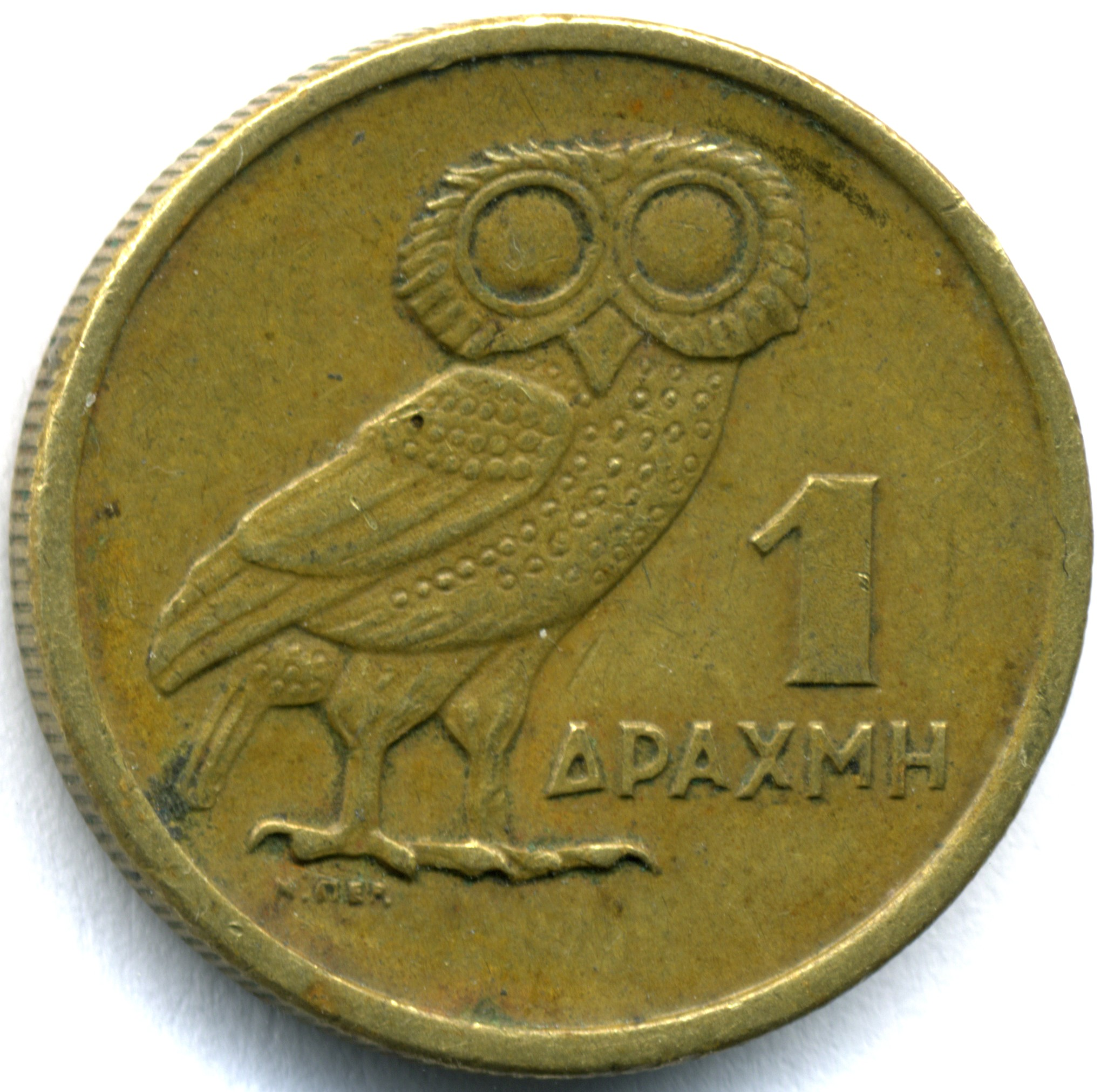
1-drachma coin depicting the Owl of Athena

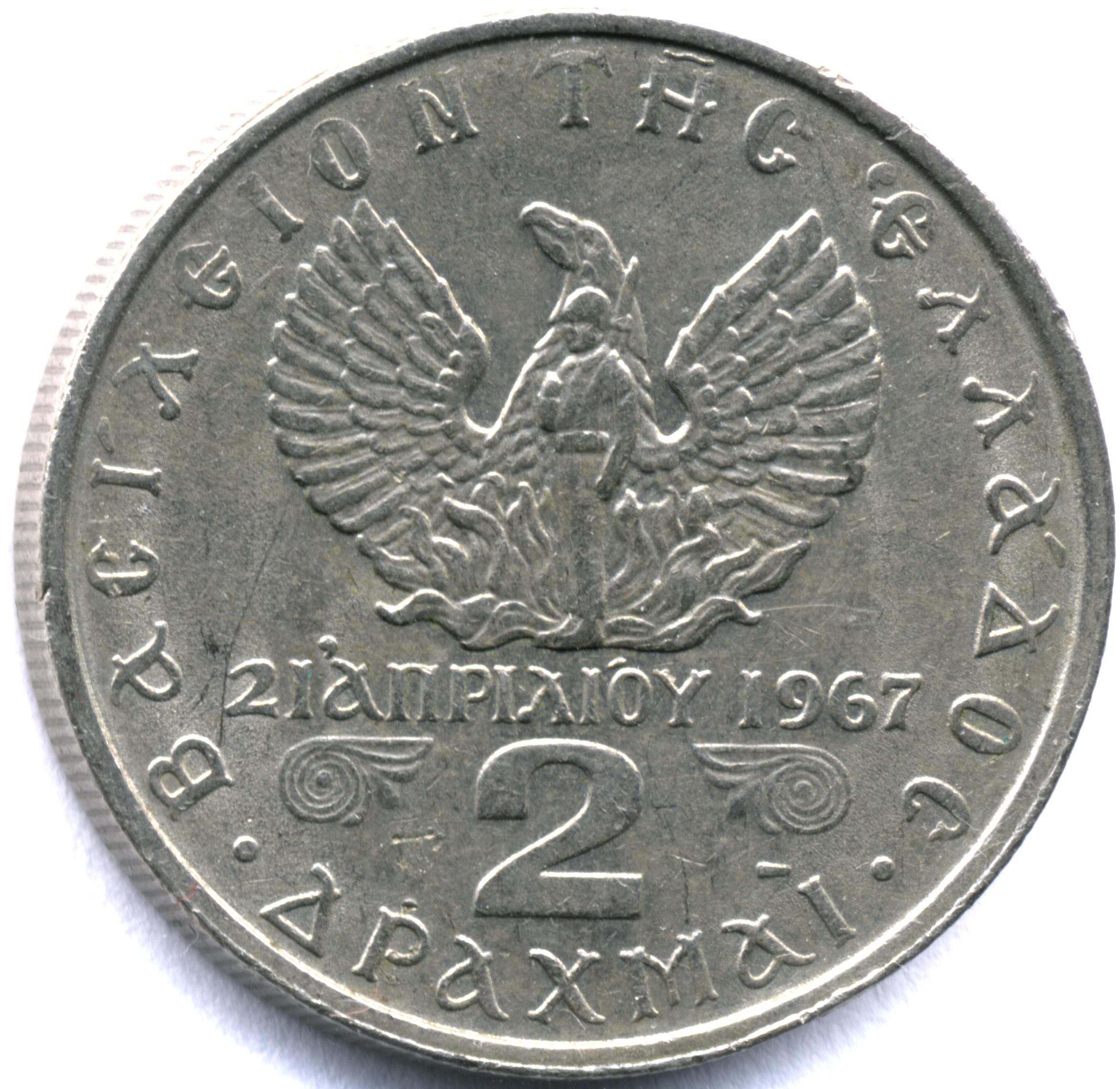
2-drachma coin with a soldier standing in front of a Phoenix

=== Banknotes ===
The first issues of banknotes were in denominations of 10, 20 and 50 drachmas, soon followed by 100, 500 and 1,000 drachmas by 1956. 5,000-drachma notes were introduced in 1984, followed by 10,000-drachma notes in 1995 and 200-drachma notes in 1997.

Banknotes in circulation at the time of the adoption of the euro were

- 100 drachmas (€0.2935), depicting Athena and Adamantios Korais
- 200 drachmas (€0.5869), depicting Rigas Feraios
- 500 drachmas (€1.47), depicting Ioannis Capodistrias
- 1,000 drachmas (€2.93), depicting Apollo
- 5,000 drachmas (€14.67), depicting Theodoros Kolokotronis
- 10,000 drachmas (€29.35), depicting George Papanicolaou and Asclepius

Banknotes of the Greek drachma (circa AD 2000)
Image	Value	Equivalent in Euro (€)	Main Color	Obverse	Reverse	Watermark
	50 δρ.	€0.1467	Blue	Head of Poseidon	Laskarina Bouboulina directing cannon fire at two Ottoman ships at Palamidi during the Greek War of Independence	Head of the Charioteer of Delphi
	100 δρ.	€0.2935	Brown and violet (obverse); Maroon, green and orange (reverse)	Head of Piraeus Athena; Christian Hansen's National and Kapodistrian University of Athens building	Adamantios Korais; Arkadi Monastery, Crete	Head of the Charioteer of Delphi
	200 δρ.	€0.5869	Deep orange	Rigas Feraios; Feraios singing his patriotic song at lower right	Nikolaos Gyzis's Krifo scholio ("secret school")	Bust of Philip of Macedonia
	500 δρ.	€1.47	Deep green	Ioannis Kapodistrias; Capodistrias's home on Corfu	Old Fortress, Corfu City	Head of the Charioteer of Delphi
	1,000 δρ.	€2.93	Brown	Bust of Apollon of Olympia	Myron's Discobolus; Temple of Hera, Olympia	Head of the Charioteer of Delphi
	5,000 δρ.	€14.67	Deep Blue or Purple and yellow-green	Theodoros Kolokotronis; Church of the Holy Apostles, Kalamata	Karytaina, Arcadia	Bust of Philip of Macedonia
	10,000 δρ.	€29.35	Deep purple	Georgios Papanikolaou; microscope	Asclepius	Bust of Philip of Macedonia

=== Gallery (banknotes) ===
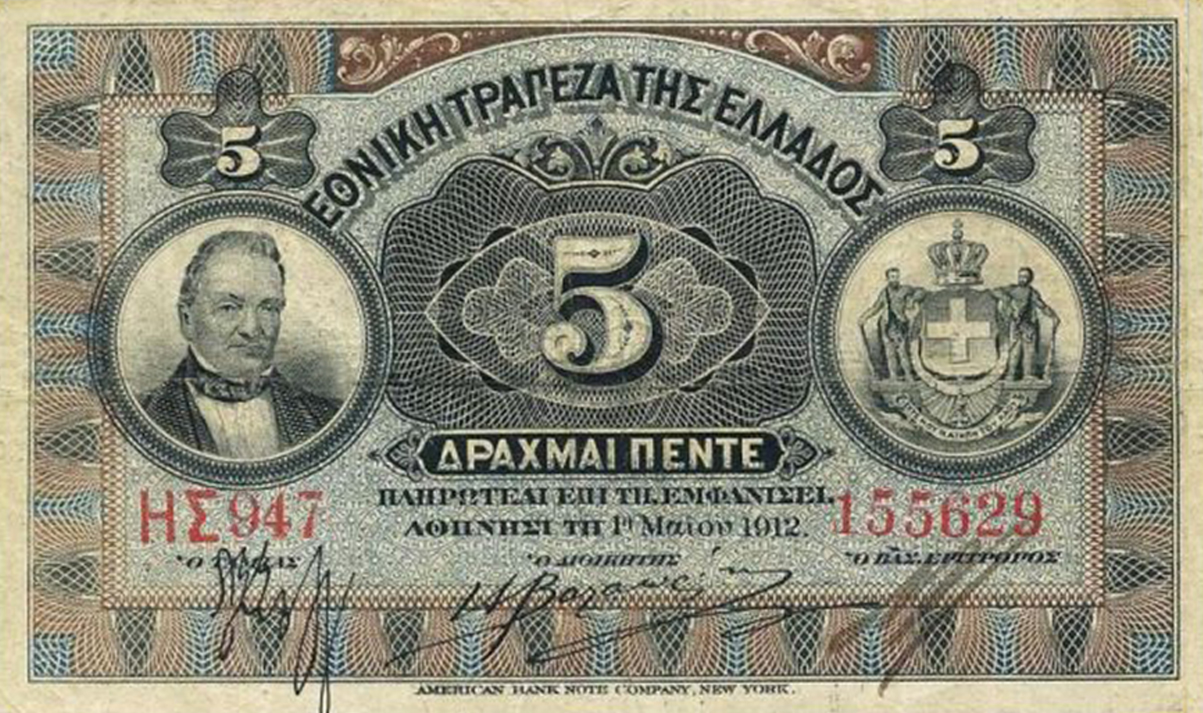
5-drachma banknote, 1912

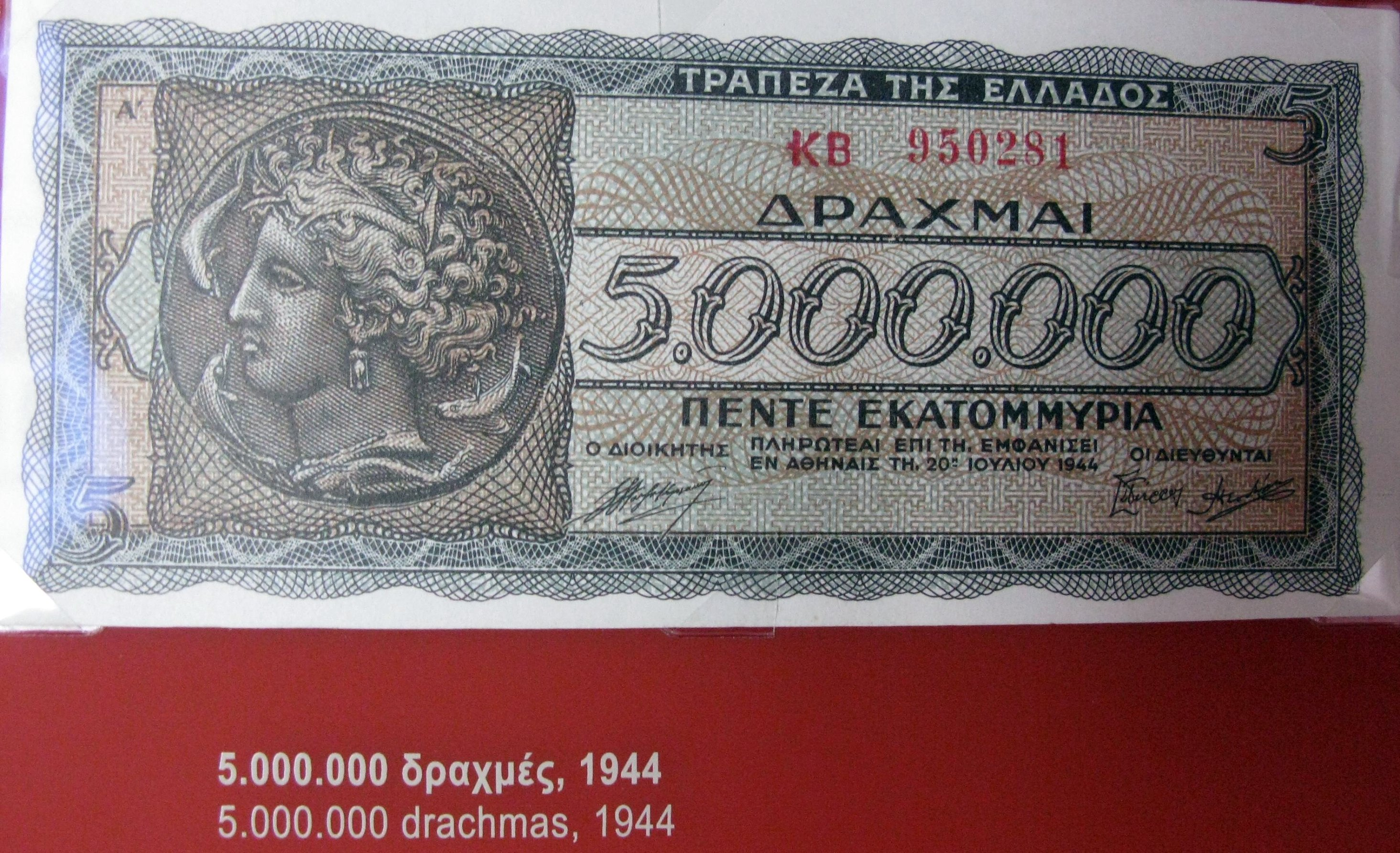
5,000,000-drachma banknote during the Axis Occupation hyperinflation period, 1944

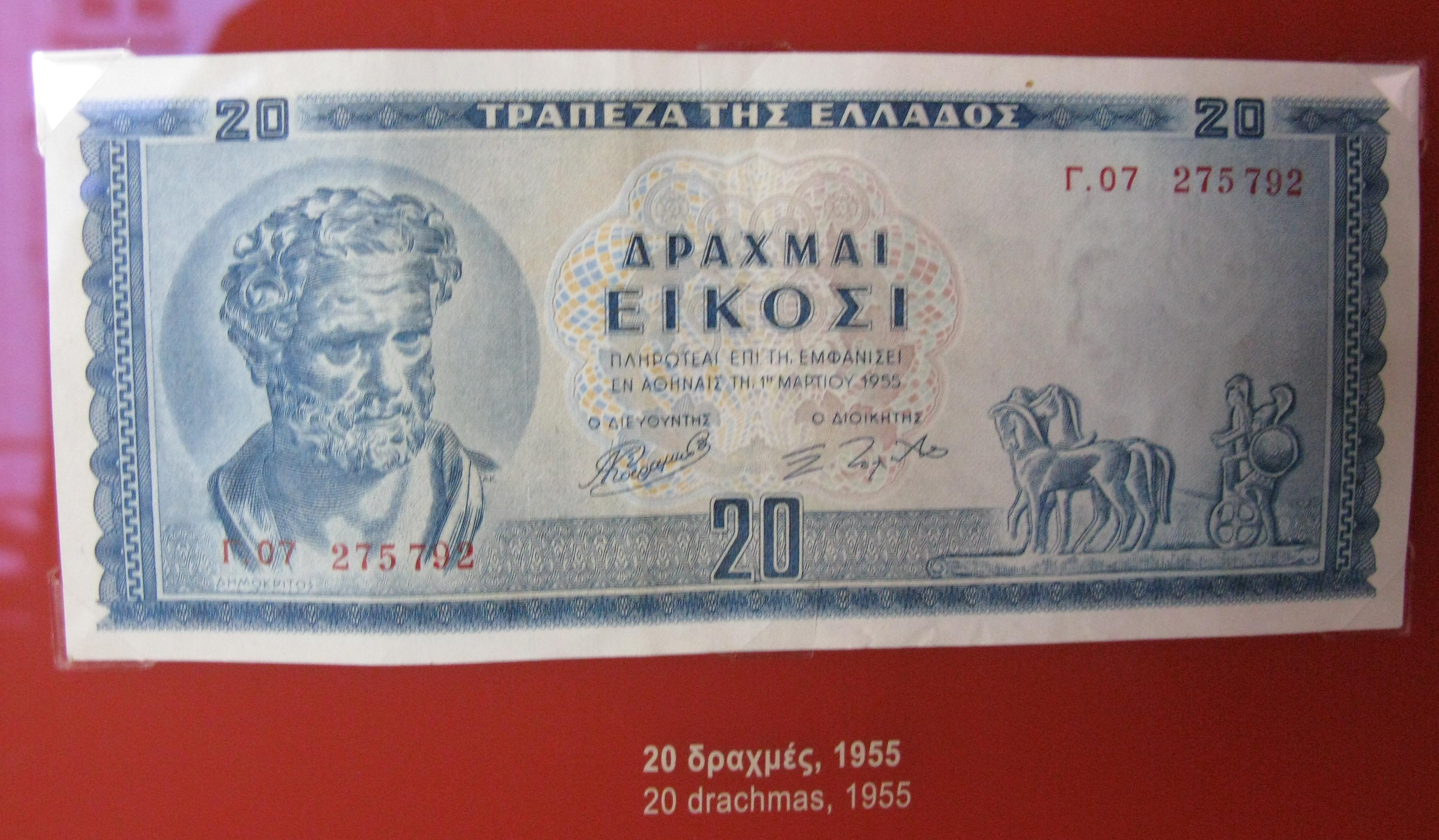
20-drachma banknote, 1955

== Encoding ==
₯ drachma sign

A currency symbol consisting of a cursive delta and rho was created in 1999, but was never used in practice. It has been included in Unicode since version 3.0 as U+20AF ₯ DRACHMA SIGN. This character should not be confused with the Attic numeral, U+10142 𐅂 GREEK ACROPHONIC ATTIC ONE DRACHMA, representing the ancient drachma.

== Restoration ==
Several parties during the Greek government-debt crisis proposed leaving the Euro and reinstating the drachma as Greece's currency. Examples include the Drachmi Greek Democratic Movement Five Stars, which was founded in 2013 and dissolved in 2015, and Popular Unity, which was founded in the wake of the 2015 Greek bailout referendum.

== See also ==
- Commemorative coins of Greece
- Economic history of Greece and the Greek world
- Economy of Greece
- Greek euro coins
- Phoenix (currency)

== Notes and references ==
Notes

Preceded by Greek phoenix	Greek currency 1832–2001	Succeeded by euro
