= Greek lepton =

Fractional units of Greek currency

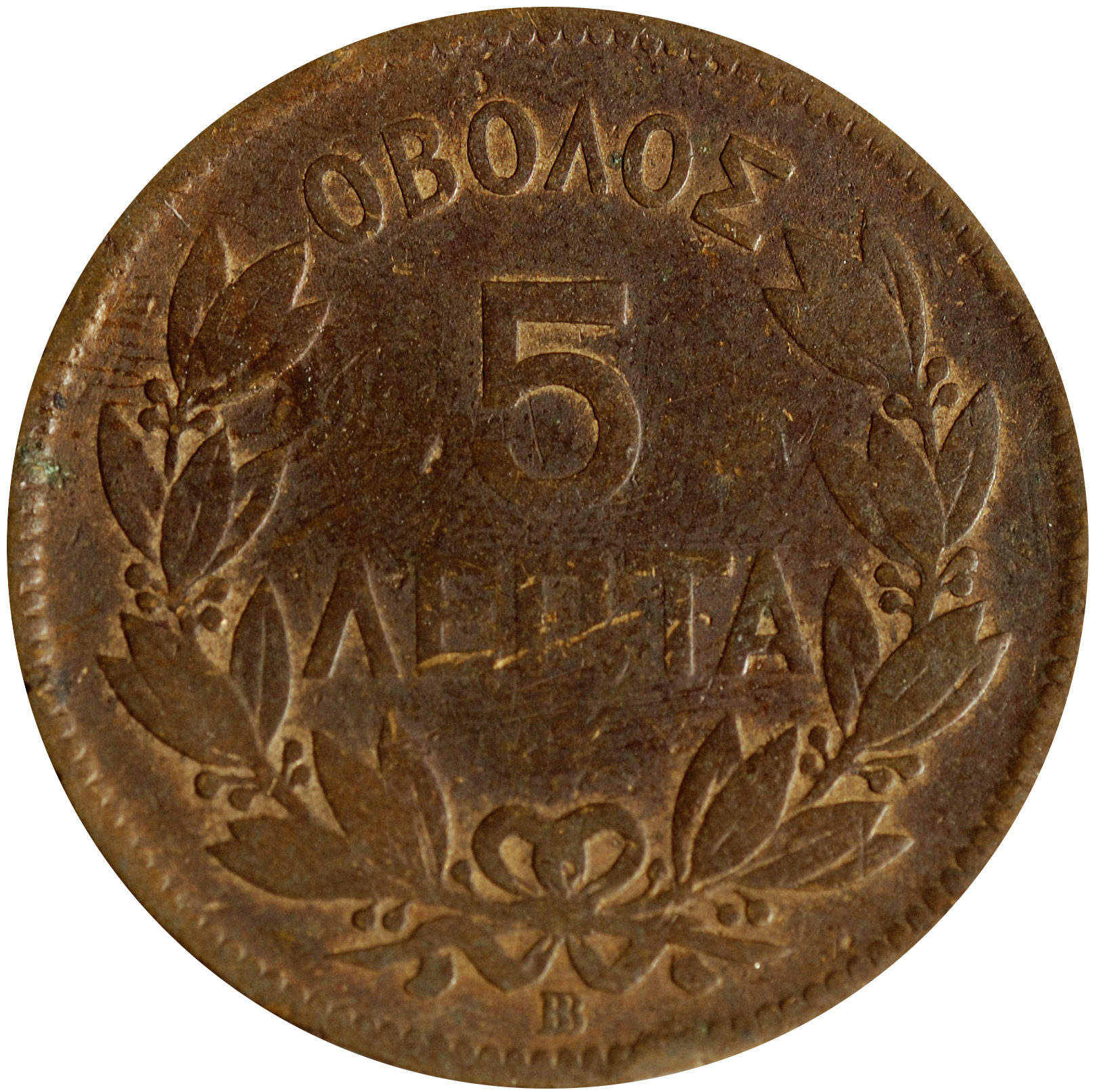
Reverse of a Greek 5 lepta coin (termed "obolos") of 1869.

The lepton, dual lepto, plural lepta (Greek: λεπτόν, λεπτώ, λεπτά), is the name of various fractional units of currency used in the Greek-speaking world from antiquity until today. The word means "small" or "thin", and during Classical and Hellenistic times a lepton was always a small value coin, usually the smallest available denomination of another currency.

The coin in the lesson of the widow's mite (Mark 12:41–44, Luke 21:1–4) is referred to as a lepton and Luke's Gospel also refers to the lepton or mite when stating that a person who does not make peace with his adversary in good time will be required to pay 'to the very last mite' before being released from prison. (The coin was originally a Flemish copper coin (Dutch mijt) worth one-third or, according to some authorities, a smaller fraction of the Flemish penning, penny. It has become a common expression in English for a coin of the smallest value, and, therefore, this term was used in the English translation of the Bible)

In the Hasmonean Kingdom the lepton was first minted under Alexander Jannaeus prior to 76 BCE.

In modern Greece, lepton (modern form: lepto, λεπτό) is the name of the 1/100 denomination of all the official currencies of the Greek state: the phoenix (1827–1832), the drachma (1832–2001) and the euro (2002–current) – the name is the Greek form of "cent". Its unofficial currency sign is Λ (lambda). Between the late 1870s and the introduction of the euro in 2001, no Greek coin was minted with a denomination lower than 5 lepta.

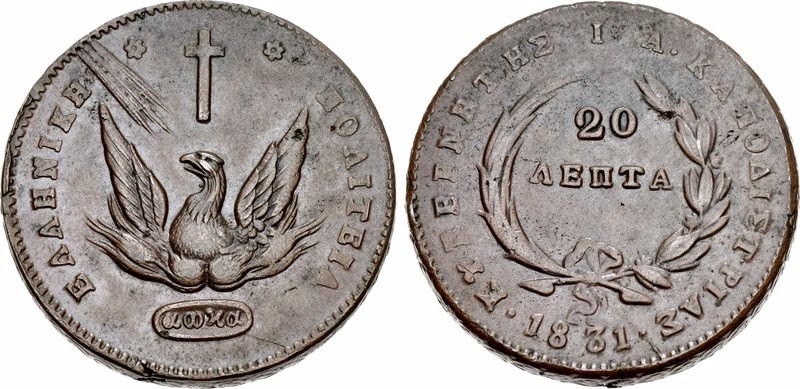
20-lepton coin, Phoenician subdivision, 1831.

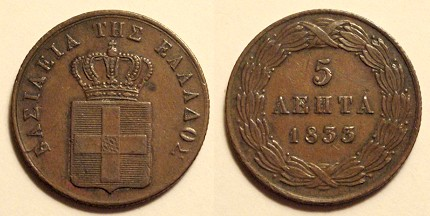
5-lepton coin, drachma subdivision, 1833.

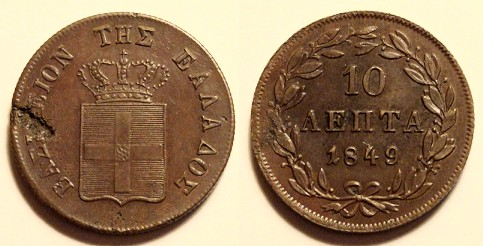
10-lepton coin, drachma subdivision, 1849.

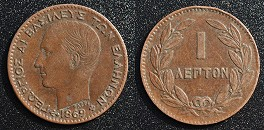
One-lepton coin of 1879, the last one-lepton coin of the drachma issued.

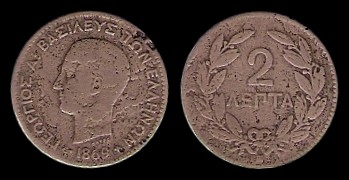
2-lepton coin 1869. The last two-lepton coins were minted in 1878.

An ancient mite of a type still circulating in Jesus' time, typical of what might have appeared in the Bible's lesson of the widow's mite.

== See also ==
- Sou, a small unit of currency, especially in France and French expressions
