= Kapodistrias =

Kapodistrias may refer to:

- Members of the Kapodistrias family:
  - Antonios Maria Kapodistrias (1741–1819), Count of Istria and politician
  - Viaros Kapodistrias (1774–1842), Politician, lawyer and member of the Filiki Eteria
  - Ioannis Kapodistrias (1776–1831), Greek diplomat and Foreign Minister of the Russian Empire and later the first head of state of independent Greece
  - Augustinos Kapodistrias (1778–1857), Greek soldier and politician
  - Maria Desylla-Kapodistria (1898–1980), Mayor of Corfu
- Capodistria, the Italian name of the city of Koper, Slovenia
- the 1997 Kapodistrias reform of local government in Greece
- Kapodistrias Museum located in Corfu

== See also ==
- Capodistria (disambiguation)
