= Kapodistrias (surname) =

Kapodistrias (Greek: Καποδίστριας) is a Greek form of Italian surname Capodistria, which signified a person from Capo d"Istria, the old Italian (and original) name of the Slovenian city which in modern times is called Koper, a port on the Adriatic near Venice, Italy. Notable people with the surname include three brothers:

- Ioannis Kapodistrias, Greek diplomat and Foreign Minister of the Russian Empire and later the first head of state of independent Greece
- Augustinos Kapodistrias, Greek soldier and politician
- Viaros Kapodistrias

== See also ==
- Koper, Slovenian city –historically a Venetian city– known in Italian as Capo d'Istria or Capodistria
