= Kapodistrias family =

The Kapodistrias family or Capodistrias (Greek: Καποδίστριας) is a Greek family, whose members distinguished themselves in politics and diplomacy.

== History ==
The origin of the Kapodistrias is from the Istrian cape of the Adriatic (Capo d'Istria) while according to others from Venice. They settled in Corfu in 1375 and were registered in the Libro d'Oro of Corfu in 1477.

All descendants of Nikolaos and Antonios Kapodistrias had the right to bear the title of count, which had been granted to them by Charles Emmanuel II, Duke of Savoy and King of Cyprus, in 1689. The recognition of the title by the Republic of Venice did not take place until 1 July 1796. Charles Emmanuel II had already died in 1675, which makes it impossible for him to have granted a title of nobility to the Kapodistrias in 1689, fourteen years after his death.

This error was not noticed by anyone until 1968, when Ricaldone pointed it out. Research in the historical archives of the House of Savoy has not made it possible to find any evidence regarding the granting of a title of nobility to the Kapodistrias. It is possible that this is either an error in the document or that the title was never granted.

During the 15th century, they acquired vast areas of land on the island and gradually the family was distinguished into three branches: the Sufis, the Mouragios contrada and the Agios Dimitrios. Most of the politicians who bear the surname Kapodistrias came from the Mouragios, while Lorentzos Mavilis came from the Sufis. The members of the family were connected by intermarriage with important families on the island such as the Vlasopoulos family, the Gonemi family, the Vassilaki family and others.

== Notable people ==
- Nikolaos Kapodistrias (1655-?), Corfu noble
- Antonios Maria Kapodistrias (1741–1819), Count of Istria and politician
- Viaros Kapodistrias (1774–1842), Politician, lawyer and member of the Filiki Eteria
- Ioannis Kapodistrias (1776–1831), Count of Istria and Governor of Greece
- Augustinos Kapodistrias (1778–1857), Soldier and politician
- Georgios Kapodistrias (1783–1841), Businessman
- Maria Desylla-Kapodistria (1898–1980), Mayor of Corfu
