= Ioannis Kolettis =

Greek politician (1773 or 1774 – 1847)

- Ἰωάννης Κωλέττης
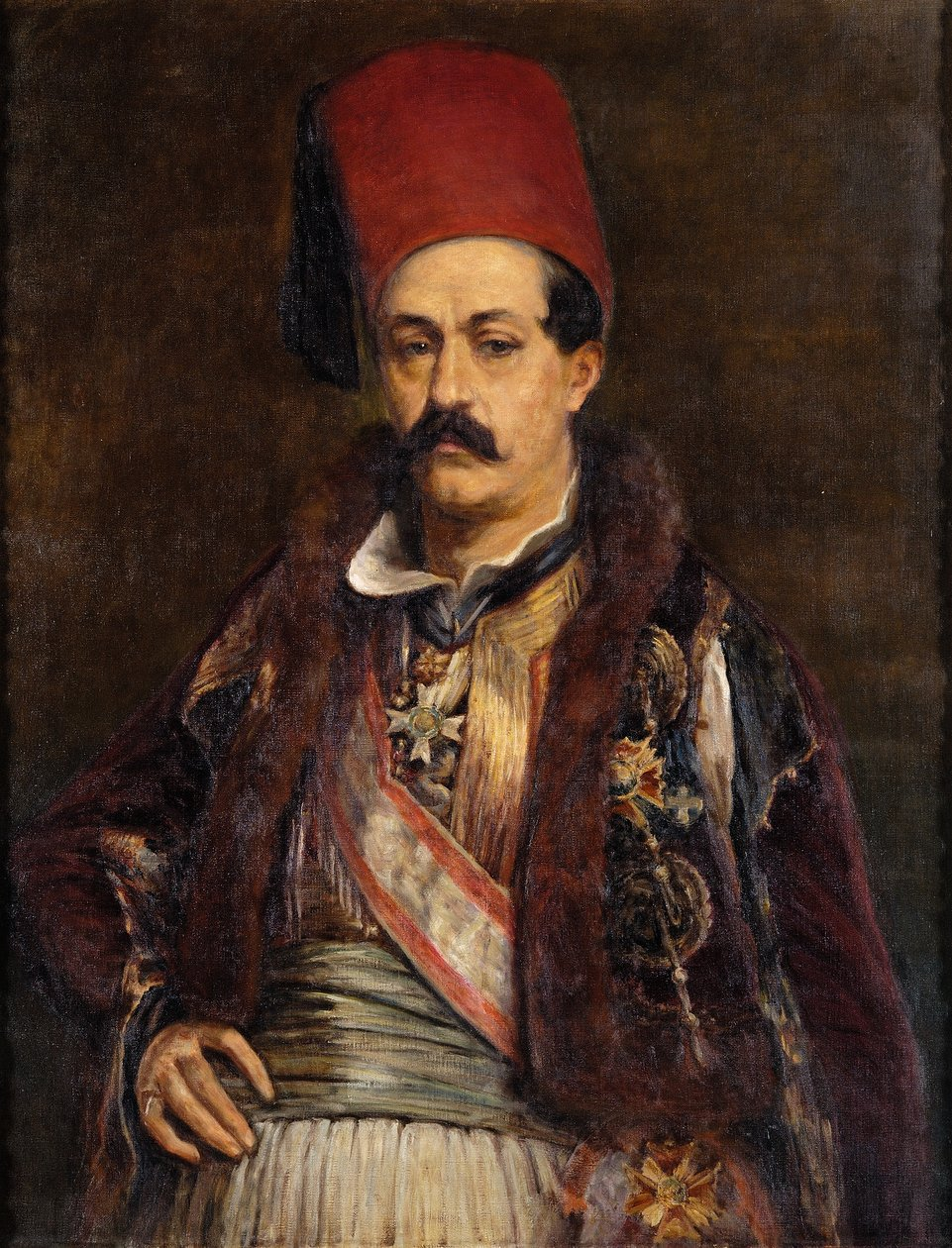
- A portrait of Ioannis Kolettis, National Historical Museum, Athens

Prime Minister of Greece
- In office 6 August 1844 – 5 September 1847
- Monarch: Otto
- Preceded by: Alexandros Mavrokordatos
- Succeeded by: Kitsos Tzavelas
- In office 31 May 1834 – 9 May 1835
- Monarch: Otto
- Regent: Josef Ludwig von Armansperg
- Preceded by: Alexandros Mavrokordatos
- Succeeded by: Josef Ludwig von Armansperg

Personal details
- Born: 1773 or 1774 Syrrako, Ioannina Eyalet, Ottoman Empire
- Died: 5 September 1847 (aged 73–74) Athens, Kingdom of Greece
- Resting place: First Cemetery of Athens (Section 2)
- Party: French Party
- Domestic partner(s): Maria Palaska; Marquise de Pouizeron
- Children: Maria Xanthi Koletti
- Education: University of Pisa
- Occupation: Physician; revolutionary; politician
- Awards: Order of the Redeemer

Military service
- Allegiance: First Hellenic Republic; Kingdom of Greece
- Branch/service: Hellenic Army
- Battles/wars: Greek War of Independence; Greek Civil Wars

Ioannis Kolettis (Greek: Ἰωάννης Κωλέττης; 1773 or 1774 – 5 September 1847) was a Greek politician who played a significant role in Greek affairs from the Greek War of Independence through the early years of the Greek Kingdom, including as Minister to France and serving twice as Prime Minister. Kolettis is credited with conceiving the Byzantine restorationist and irredentist Megali Idea or "Great Idea" which became the core of Greek foreign policy until the early 20th century.

== Early life ==
Kolettis was a hellenized Aromanian, with a strong sense of Greek identity. He was born in Syrrako, Epirus and played a leading role in the political life of the Greek state in the 1830s and 1840s. Kolettis studied medicine in Pisa, Italy and was influenced by the Carbonari movement and started planning his return to Epirus in order to participate in Greece's independence struggles.

In 1813, he settled at Ioannina, where he served as a doctor and after gaining standing he was recruited as the personal doctor of Ali Pasha's son, Muhtar Pasha. He remained in Ioannina till March 1821, when he entered Filiki Eteria and left for Syrrako, together with chieftain Raggos, in order to spread the revolution into Central Greece (Rumeli), but his efforts quickly failed because of the rapid reaction of the Ottoman army. Kolettis was the leader of the pro-French party and based his power on his relations with the leaders of Central Greece but also on his ability to eliminate his adversaries by acting behind the scenes.

== Greek War of Independence ==
In the First Greek National Assembly, at Epidavros, he participated as the representative of Epirus and in January 1822 he became Minister of Internal Affairs. After the Second Greek National Assembly, at Astros in May 1823 he was appointed sub-prefect of Euboea and managed to remove Turkish troops off the island. At the same time, he continued his political activities, resulting in his election as member of the Legislative Body (Νομοθετικόν), a position that he held till 1826.

At the end of 1824, during the civil war between the rebel factions, he was in charge of the Roumeliot (Central Greece) party and defeated the Moreot or Peloponnesian party, which opposed the Kountouriotis government. Nonetheless, in the Third Greek National Assembly, he supported the Peloponnesian party and with its support was assigned to train troops from Thessaly and Macedonia, with the aim of destroying Ottoman resource depots at Atalanti. However, the whole operation failed because of his inexperience in military affairs, which ruined his reputation.

== Political career after 1821 ==
When Ioannis Kapodistrias landed at Nafplio in January 1828 as governor, he was appointed as governor of Samos and later, in July 1829 as Minister of Defense. In October 1831, Kapodistrias was assassinated; in the ensuing civil war, which lasted until 1832, Kolettis was once again leader of the Roumeliot Party. He tried, along with Theodoros Kolokotronis and Augustinos Kapodistrias to form a government but due to severe disagreements the coalition was dissolved. To assume leadership after 1821, he is considered responsible for the death of a great Greek Independence Hero, Odysseus Androutsos, and also responsible for the separation ("divide and conquer") of a legendary couple of the Greek Independence: Prince Demetrios Ypsilantis and Manto Mavrogenous.

== Political career during Otto's reign ==
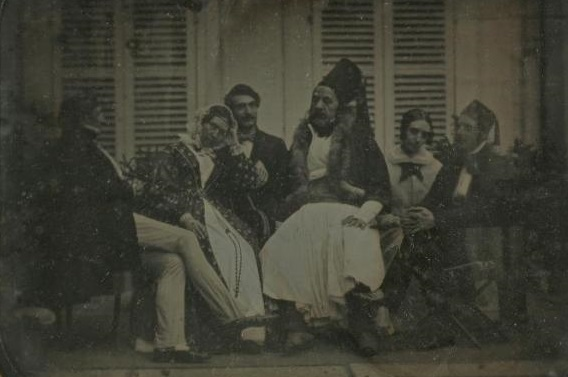
Ioannis Kolettis (centre) in Paris, photographed with Jean-Gabriel Eynard (far left) and Anna Eynard-Lullin (second from left), 1842.

Until Otto of Greece reached adulthood, Kolettis was Minister of the Navy and Minister of Defense. In 1835, he was sent to France as the ambassador where he created connections with French politicians and intellectuals. He returned to Greece after the coup that broke out in Athens in September 1843, which forced King Otto to grant a constitution and Kolettis took part in the subsequent Constitutional Assembly. To contest the elections in 1844, he formed a party, the French Party (Γαλλικό Κόμμα) and together with Andreas Metaxas, leader of the Russian Party formed a government. When Metaxas resigned, he became Prime Minister and served as such until his death in 1847. He is credited with conceiving the Megali Idea or "Great Idea" which became the core of Greek foreign policy until the early 20th century.

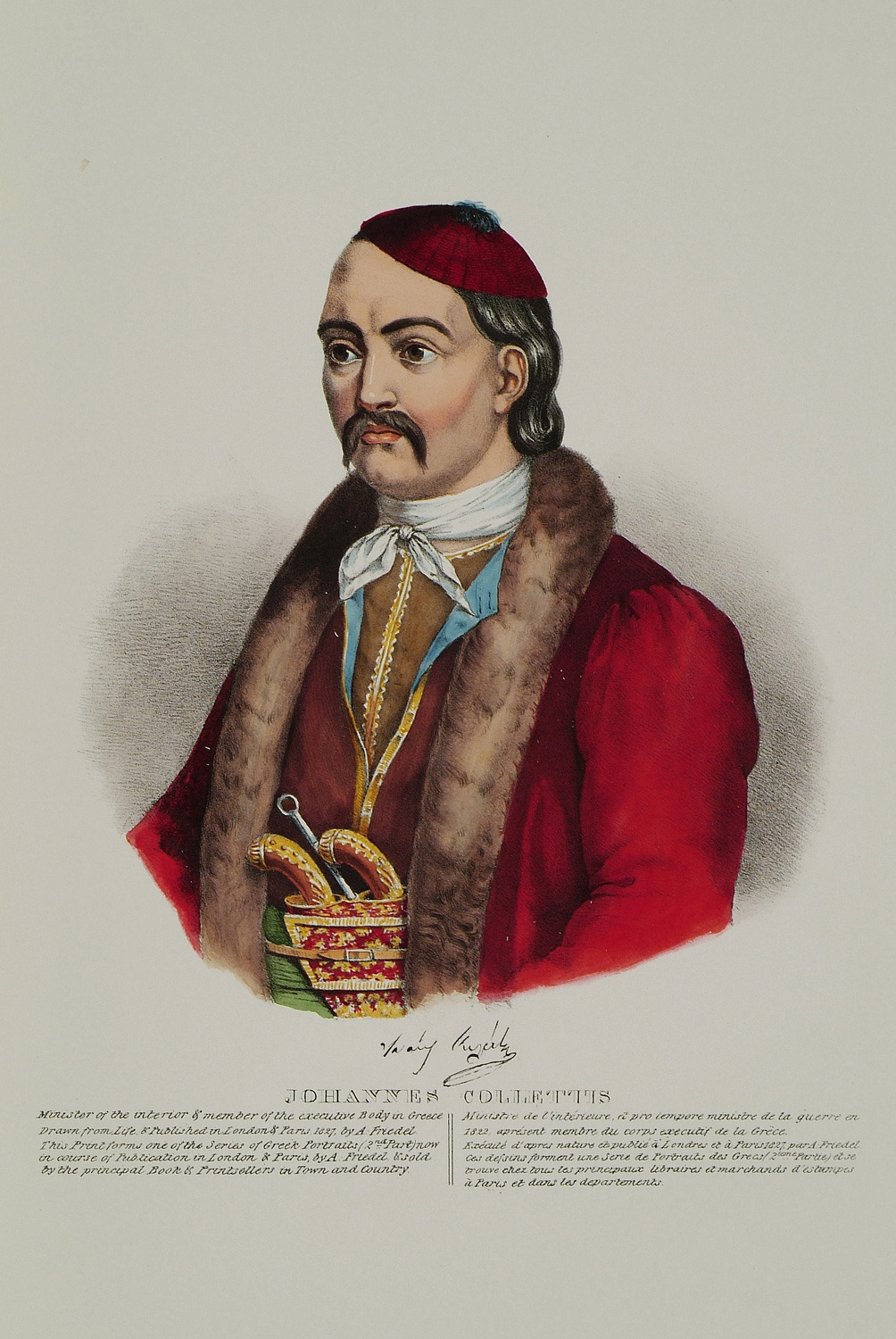
Ioannis Kolettis by Adam Friedel

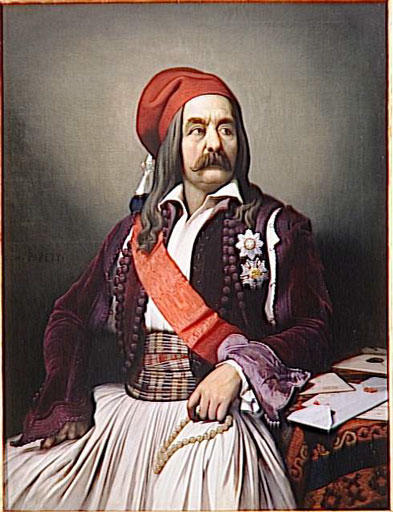
Ioannis Kolettis by Dominique Papety

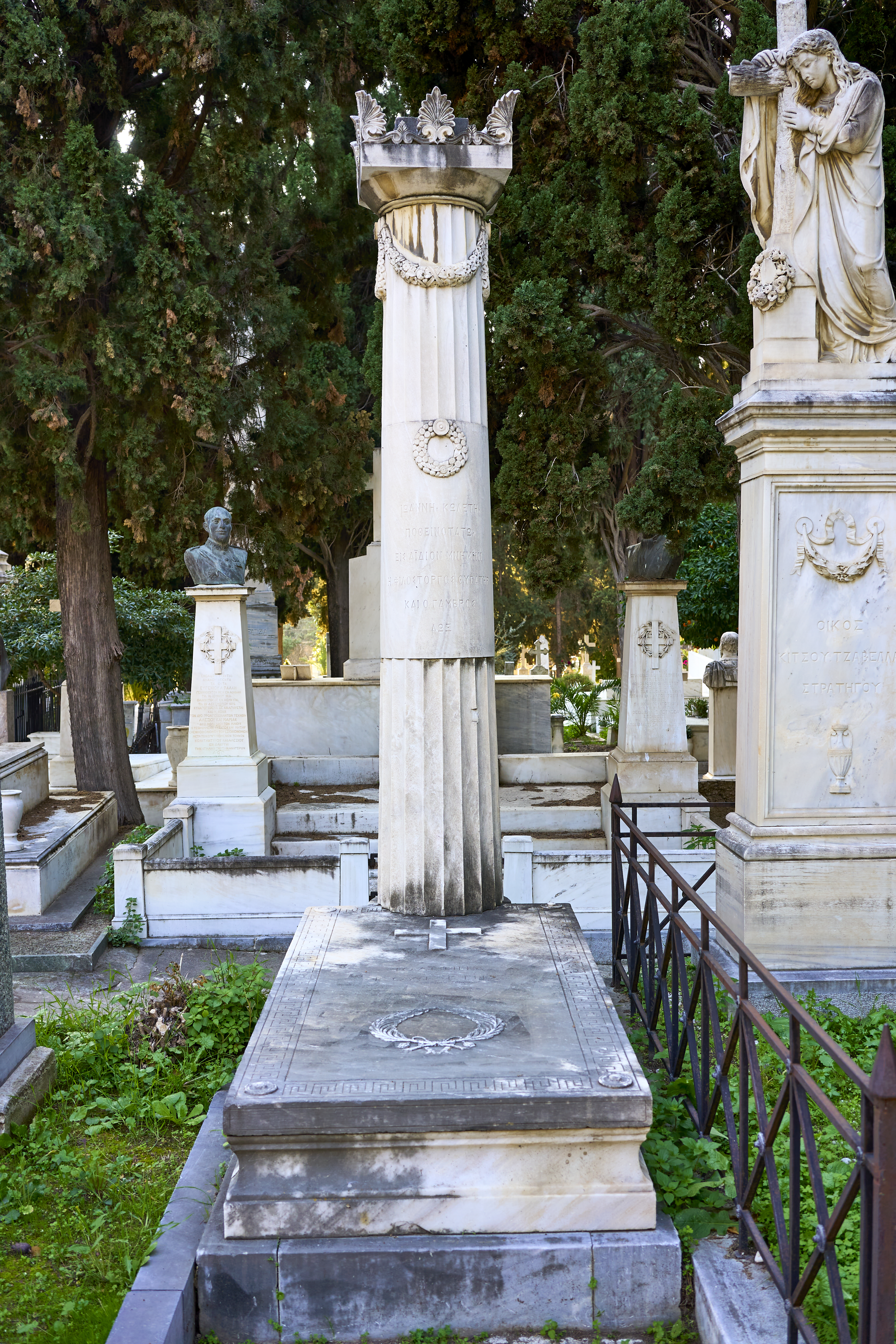
The grave of Ioannis Kolettis in the First Cemetery of Athens. Immediately to the right is the grave of Kitsos Tzavelas.

Political offices
Preceded by Alexandros Mavrokordatos	Prime Minister of Greece; 31 May 1834 - 9 May 1835	Succeeded by Graf von Armansperg
Preceded by Alexandros Mavrokordatos	Prime Minister of Greece; 6 August 1844 – 5 September 1847	Succeeded by Kitsos Tzavelas
