= Administrative Committee of Greece (1831) =

The Administrative Committee of Greece (Greek: Διοικητική Επιτροπή της Ελλάδος) of 1831 was a committee that was created to temporarily assume the executive powers that had been left vacant with the assassination of Governor Ioannis Kapodistrias. The Committee came into being in December 1831 and was dissolved in February or March 1832.

The Committee was presided over by Kapodistrias' brother Augustinos. The other members of the Committee were Theodoros Kolokotronis and Ioannis Kolettis. The Committee was dissolved in March 1832 after Augustinos left to return to Corfu.

The committee received and responded to a letter from the Kingdom of Sweden and Norway offering formal recognition of an independent Greece marking one of the first such recognitions by a non-great power.

On 28 March 1832, a new five-person Administrative Committee was created with Georgios Kountouriotis, Alexander Ypsilantis, Andreas Zaimis, Markos Botsaris, and Spyridon Trikoupis.

== See also ==
- Greek Senate (1829)
