= Capodistria =

Capodistria or Capo d'Istria may refer to:

- Giovanni Capo d'Istria or Capodistria, the Italian name of the Greek statesman Ioannis Kapodistrias
- Capo d'Istria or Capodistria, the Italian name of the city of Koper

== See also ==
- Kapodistrias (disambiguation)
