= Platytera Monastery =

Monastery in Corfu, Greece

Coordinates: 39°37′19.23″N 19°54′37.47″E

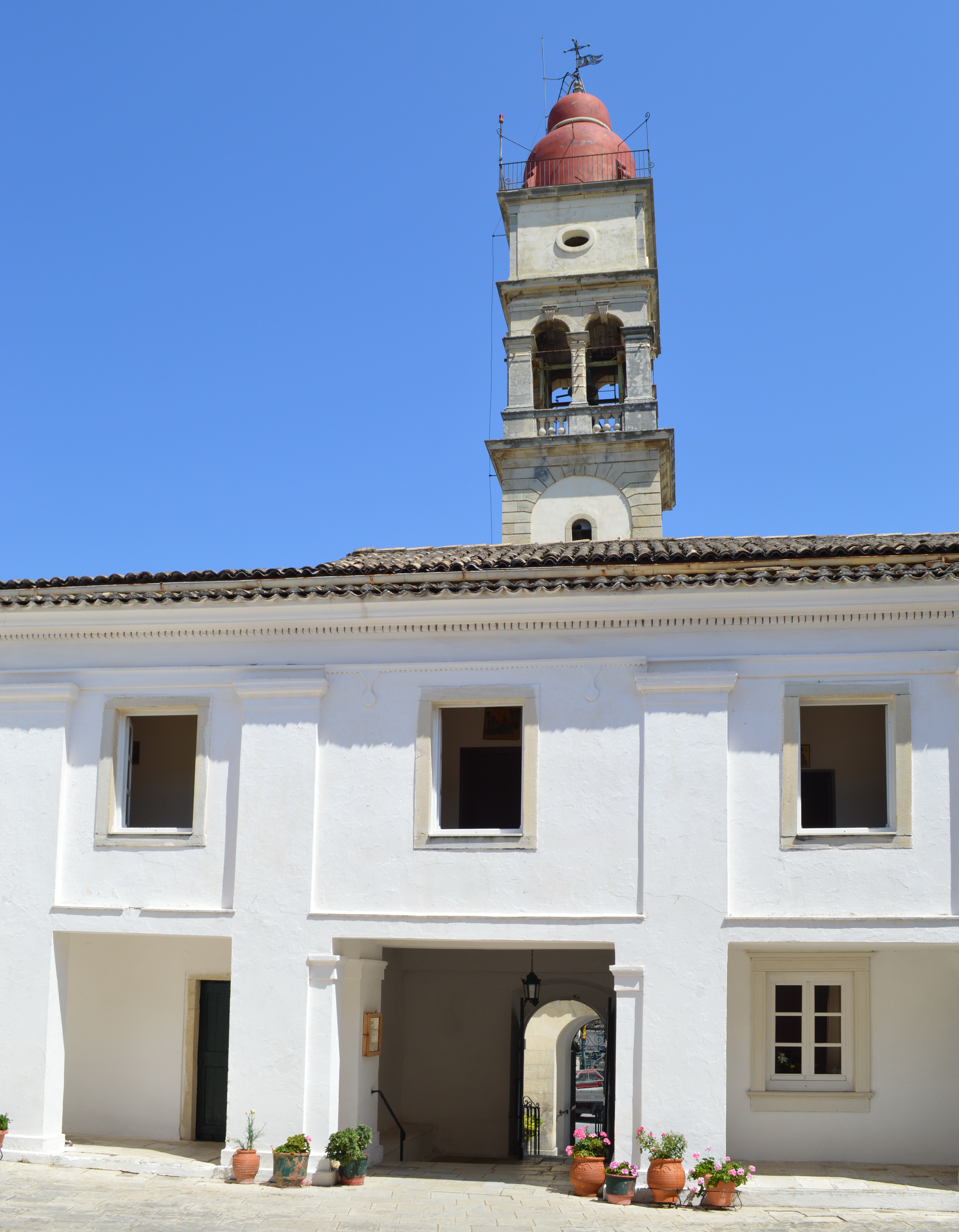
Courtyard and belltower of the monastery

The Platytera Monastery (Greek: Μονή Πλατυτέρας), formally the Holy Monastery of the Most Holy Mother of God Platytera (Ιερά Μονή Υπεραγίας Θεοτόκου Πλατυτέρας), is a Greek Orthodox monastery in the city of Corfu in Greece.

It was founded in 1741 and finished in 1743, during the last period of Venetian rule. It was then rebuilt after being almost destroyed in the Siege of Corfu (1798–1799). It is notable as the burial place of the first governor of independent Greece, Ioannis Kapodistrias.
