= Jean-Gabriel Eynard =

Swiss banker and philhellene (1775–1863)

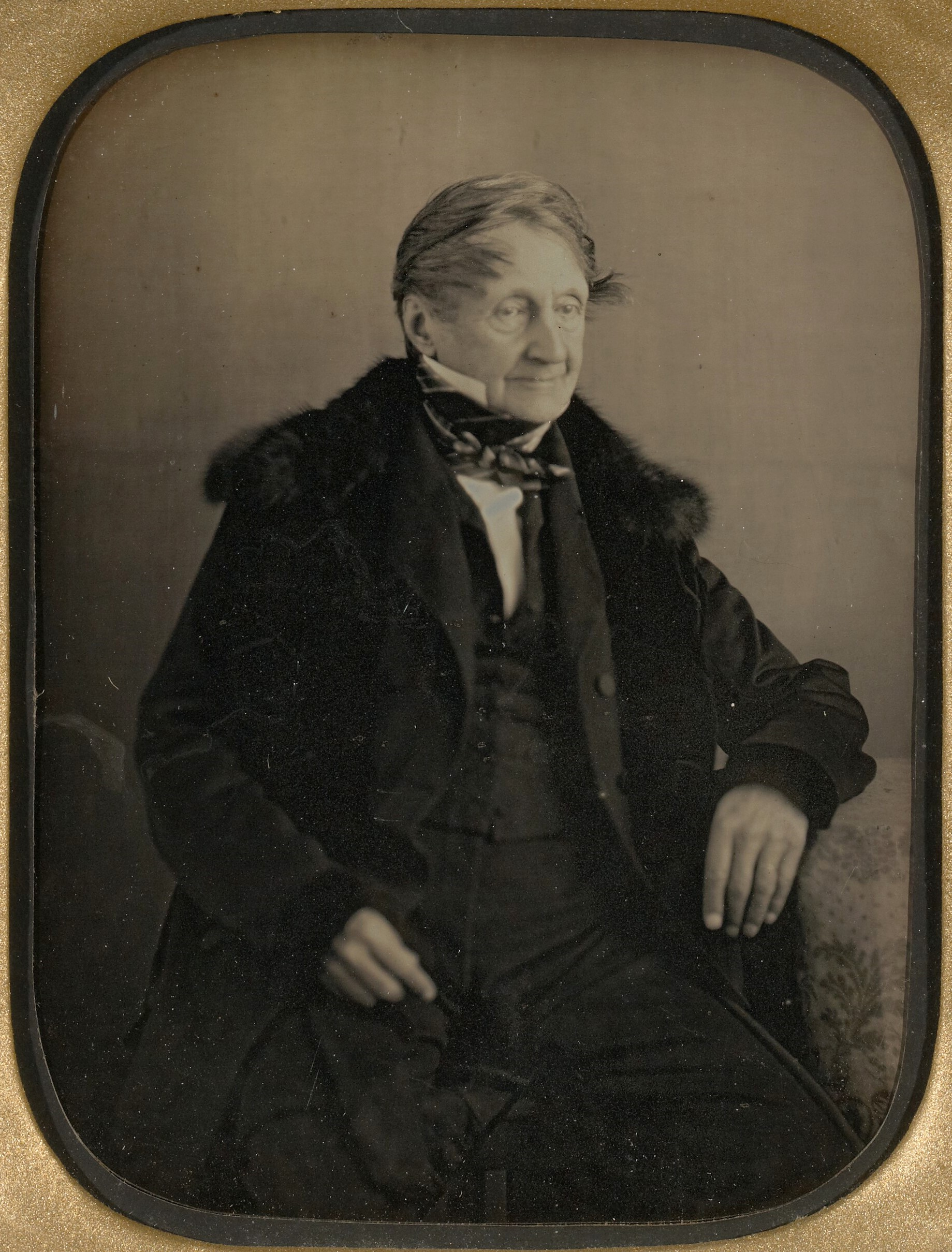
Jean-Gabriel Eynard

Jean-Gabriel Eynard (28 December 1775 – 5 February 1863) was a Swiss banker and significant benefactor of the Greek independence movement.

== Biography ==
Jean-Gabriel Eynard although belonging to a family who had settled in Switzerland since the 17th century was actually born in Lyon, France - where his father owned a business - on 28 December 1775. During the French Revolution the family fled France and took refuge in Rolle, Switzerland.

In 1795, Jean-Gabriel and his brother Jacques went to Genoa and both were soon heading a flourishing commercial concern. In 1800 Massena's troops entered the town and Jean-Gabriel was entrusted with their supply. In particular he furnished them with uniforms cut from the blue cloth called "bleu de Genes" whence later derives the famous garment known worldwide as "blue jeans".

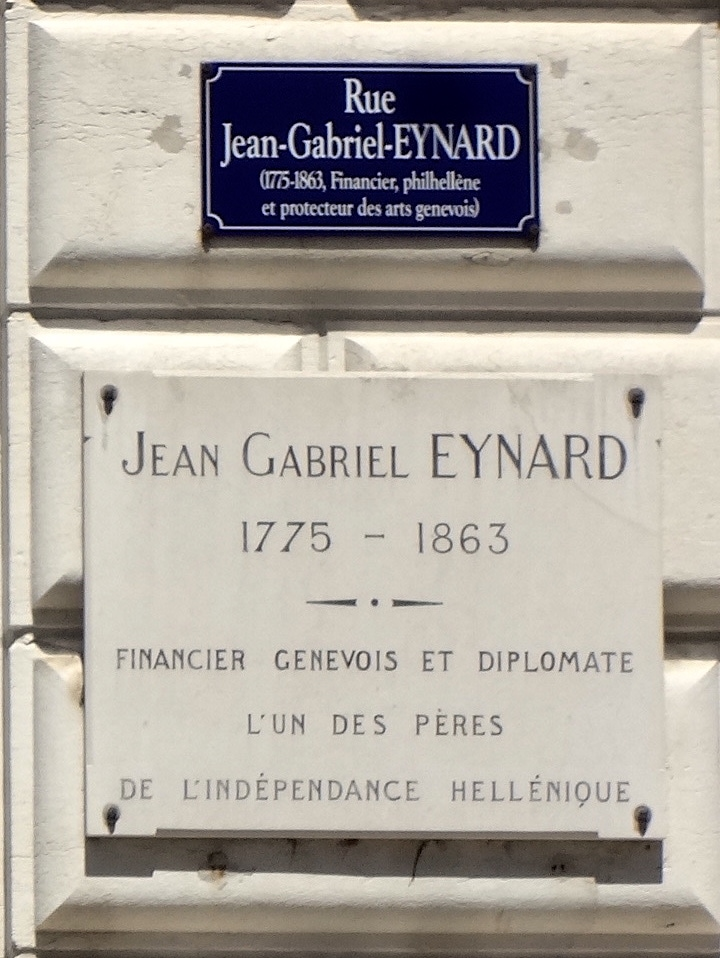
Rue Eynard in Geneva

In 1801, he entered in a speculative and hazardous financial venture becoming the sole subscriber to a bond issued by the king Louis I of Etruria. That move succeeded and constituted the foundation of his fortune.

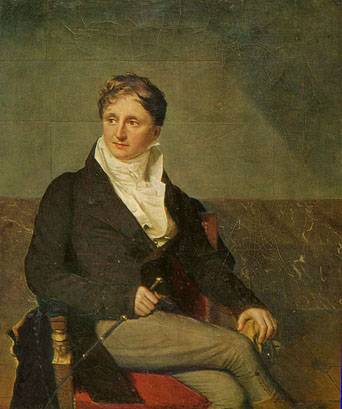
Portrait of Eynard by Firmin Massot.

In 1803, he moved to Florence called forth by the Queen of Etruria, and thence he devoted much zeal and talent to the reformation and improvement of the finances of the Principality of Lucca and Piombino and he was also successful with those of the Tuscan state. Under the reign of Elisa Bonaparte, Napoleon's sister, as Grand-Duchess of Tuscany he continued his work with much success and was showered with honours and privileges.

In 1809, he spent a long time in Paris in order to await the Emperor's return having been entrusted with the mission of thanking him, on behalf of both the Mediterranean Department and the Chamber of Commerce of Livorno, for the nomination of Elisa as Grand Duchess.

In 1810 he moved to Geneva. He was ambassador of the Republic of Geneva at the Congress of Vienna in 1815. In the following year he helped to organize the administration of Tuscany, which he represented at the Congress of Aix-la-Chapelle in 1818.

Being a friend of Ioannis Kapodistrias, he was very enthusiastic for the cause of the Greeks during the Greek War of Independence. He was the chief of the philhellenes community in Europe, and aided the revolutionaries financially. For his services to this cause, he was made a Greek citizen. He advised the new state. His recommendation of Otho of Bavaria for the throne of Greece was adopted. In 1842, he became one of the co-founders of the National Bank of Greece.

In 1839, he was one of the first Swiss to use the daguerreotype. He had this passion until his death in 1863. He bequeathed his fortune to various charitable enterprises.

He was married to Anna Eynard-Lullin.

== Writing ==
- Lettres et documents officiels relatifs aux divers événements de Grèce (1831)
