= Kapodistrias Museum =

Museum in Corfu, Greece

Coordinates: 39°37′23.2″N 19°52′8.7″E

The Capodistrias Museum – Center of Capodistrian Studies (also known as: The Kapodistrias Museum or Kapodistrias Museum–Centre of Kapodistrian Studies) (Greek: Μουσείο Καποδίστρια–Κέντρο Καποδιστριακών Μελετών) is a museum dedicated to the memory and life's work of Ioannis Kapodistrias. It is located in the area Koukouritsa of Evropouli in Corfu, Greece. Ioannis Kapodistrias was the first governor of Greece, Minister of Foreign Affairs of the Russian Empire, and a great diplomat, politician, and physician. The property was donated by Maria Desylla-Kapodistria, great granddaughter of Georgios Kapodistrias, younger brother of Ioannis Kapodistrias, and the only one of the brothers who married. The museum was established in 1981. Ioannis Kapodistrias' summer home in the rural area of Koukouritsa in his birthplace of Corfu houses the museum showcasing exhibits commemorating his life and accomplishments. Maria Desylla-Kapodistria, a former mayor of Corfu (1956–1959) and the first female mayor in Greece, donated the residence to the three primary cultural societies of Corfu (the Reading Society of Corfu, the Philharmonic Society of Corfu and the Society of Corfiote Studies) specifically for that purpose. The museum also functions as a center for Kapodistrian and Corfiote studies.

== The museum's exhibition & collection ==
Maria Desylla-Kapodistria, grand niece of Ioannis Kapodistrias, donor of the museum, past mayor of Corfu and first female mayor of Greece. The museum was the summer home of Ioannis Kapodistrias, first governor of Greece.

In 2017, the Kapodistrias Museum reopened after five years of renovation, featuring a new permanent exhibition and enriched with research, educational, and entertainment services. The permanent exhibition presents personal items of Ioannis Kapodistrias, portraits of the Kapodistrias family, books from the personal collection of Ioannis Kapodistrias as well as works of art and furniture dating from his lifetime. In the Koukouritsa room, the history of the Koukouritsa estate and house of the Kapodistrias family and the transformation of this building into a museum dedicated to Ioannis Kapodistrias is presented. The Museum offers visitors a free audio-guided tour in four languages (Greek, English, Russian, French).

== The museum's garden ==
The historic garden of the Koukouritsa estate, an area of 1,3 acres, is characterized by its dense vegetation, as well as by the view it offers both towards the city of Corfu itself and towards Epirus. During the summer months cultural events are hosted in the garden. The garden also offers a free web based guided tour to its history and ecosystem and an open-air Cafe under the pine trees, open during between April & October.

== Museum awards ==
- In 2023, the Benaki Museum honored the Kapodistrias Museum in recognition of its contribution to the cultural life of the Greeks. The Kapodistrias Museum received the distinction at a special event held at the Benaki Museum – Greek Culture organized as part of the celebrations of the International Museum Day, on May 23, 2023.
- In 2022, the Kapodistrias Museum was the only museum from Greece which was a candidate for the European Museum of the Year Award (EMYA) for the year 2022. This award was organized by the European Forum for Museums.
- In 2018, the Kapodistrias Museum Cafe won a distinction by the Hellenic Institute of Architecture, as one of the most important examples of architectural projects of the 2016-2018 period, projects that acted as indicators for contemporary architecture in Greece. The Kapodistrias Museum Café project was presented in the 9th Biennale of Young Greek Architects at the Benaki Museum - Piraeos 138 (26/9 - 25/11/2018).
