= Anna Eynard-Lullin =

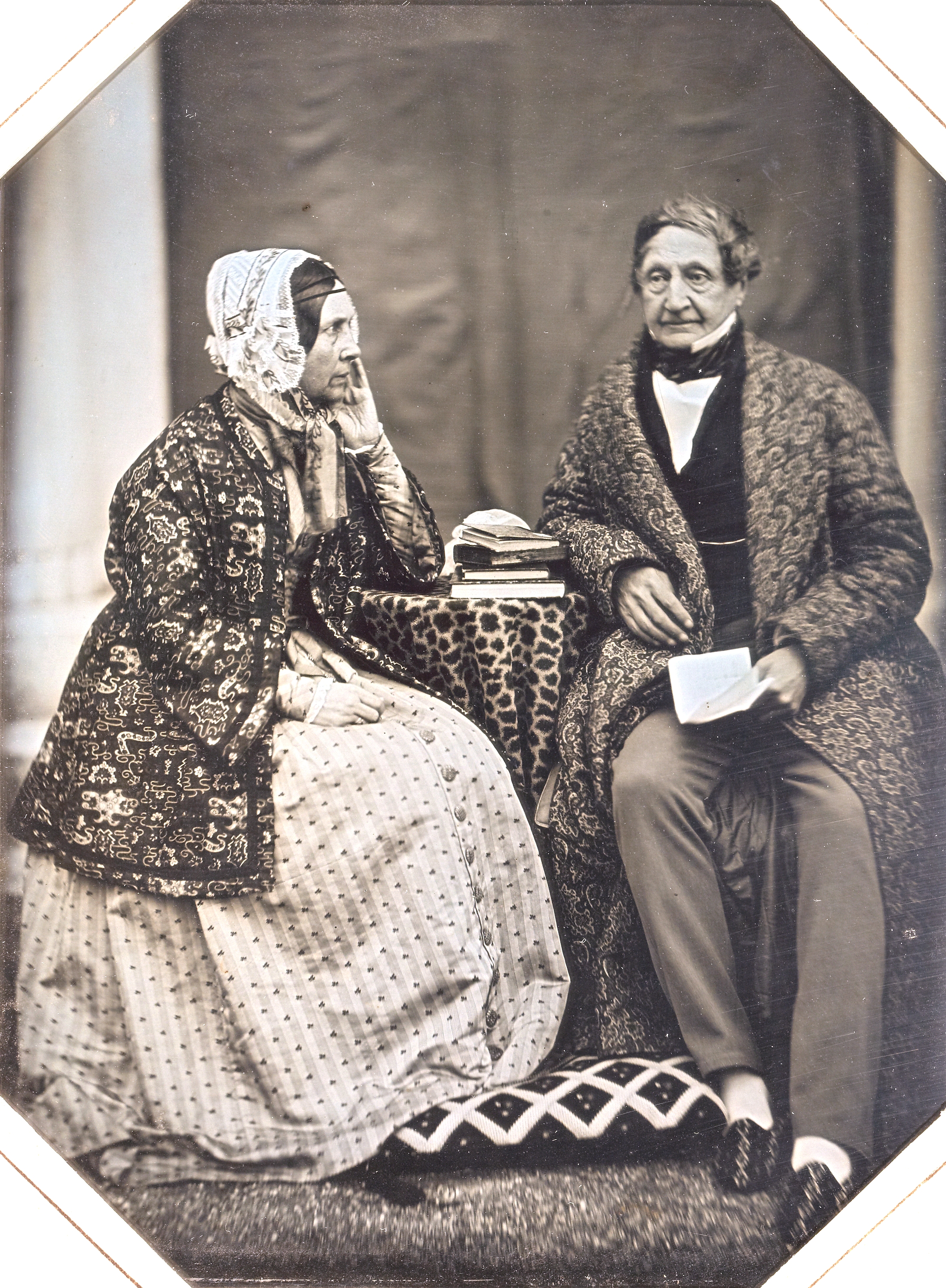
- Born: 26 May 1793
- Died: 30 October 1868 (aged 75)

Anna Eynard-Lullin (26 May 1793 - 30 October 1868), was a Swiss philanthropist, born a citizen of Republic of Geneva. She was married to the politician Jean-Gabriel Eynard and was known to have indirectly influenced the Treaty of Paris (1814), Congress of Vienna and the Congress of Aix-la-Chapelle (1818). In Switzerland, she was known for her charitable projects.
