= Maria Desylla-Kapodistria =

Greek politician

Mayor of Corfu
- In office 15 April 1956 – 9 May 1959

Personal details
- Born: 1898
- Died: 1980 (aged 81–82)
- Occupation: Greek politician

Maria Desylla-Kapodistria (Greek: Μαρία Δεσύλλα Καποδίστρια, 1898–1980) was the mayor of Corfu from 1956 until 1959. Her election as mayor on 15 April 1956 made her the first woman elected mayor of a city in the history of modern Greece. She donated the land on which the Kapodistrias Museum, established in 1981 in memory of her ancestor Ioannis Kapodistrias, considered the founder of the modern Greek state, lies today.
