= Viaros Kapodistrias =

Greek politician (1774–1842)

Viaros Kapodistrias (Greek: Βιάρος Καποδίστριας, 1774–1842) was a Greek politician, lawyer and member of the Filiki Eteria, a secret organization whose purpose was to overthrow the Ottoman rule of Greece and establish an independent Greek state. He was brother of Governors of Greece Ioannis Kapodistrias and Augustinos Kapodistrias.

== Biography ==
Viaros Kapodistrias was born in 1774 in Corfu. He was the eldest son of diplomat Count Antonios Maria Kapodistrias and of Diamantina, daughter of Christodoulos Gonemis. After studying general courses in his hometown, he studied law at the University of Padua. When he returned to the Ionian Islands, he served as a member of the Ionian Senate in 1818 in Corfu and was initiated into the Filiki Eteria by Aristeidis Pappas. During the Greek Revolution, having his base in Corfu, Viaros and the merchant Konstantinos Gerostathis were a link between philhellenic clubs of Western Europe and the revolutionaries. At the same time, he was helping and caring for refugees who fled to the Ionian Islands from the rebellious areas.

In March 1828, he and his brother Augustinos went to Greece, to assist their brother, Ioannis Kapodistrias, who was Governor of Greece. He was a member of the Panellinion advisory council and, together with Alexandros Mavrokordatos, was placed in charge of military affairs. He was also member of the General Intendancy, the main administrative body for the Army and the Navy, temporary commissioner of the Sporades and, from October 1829, Minister of Naval Affairs. At the same time, he was in charge of the secret police. He contributed to the Orphanage of Aegina and to the establishment of the Archaeological Museum of Aegina. Viaros was accused of nepotism, especially by the anti-Kapodistrian political faction, due to the fact that both he and Augustinos were promoted to senior state posts. Viaros was also accused of authoritarianism and various abuses of power.

In May 1831, after the fall of Augustinos Kapodistrias from power, Viaros fled to Corfu, where he died in 1842.
