= Augustinos Kapodistrias =

Greek soldier and politician (1778–1857)

Count Augustinos Kapodistrias
- Αυγουστίνος Καποδίστριας
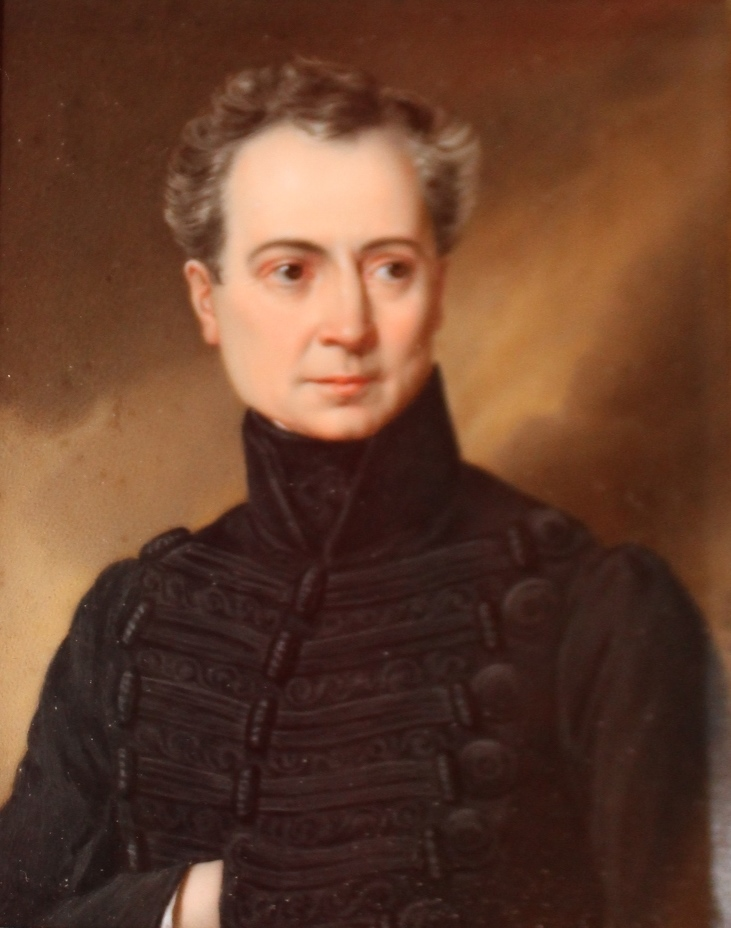
- Portrait, 19th century

Governor of Greece
- In office 27 September 1831 – 28 March 1832 (Note: As President of the Administrative Committee of Greece (1831) until 8 December 1831.)
- Preceded by: Ioannis Kapodistrias
- Succeeded by: Georgios Kountouriotis (as President of the Administrative Committee of Greece (1832))

Personal details
- Born: 1778 Corfu, Republic of Venice
- Died: 1857 (aged 78–79) St. Petersburg, Russia
- Party: Russian Party
- Relations: Viaros Kapodistrias (brother); Ioannis Kapodistrias (brother)

Count Augustinos Ioannis Maria Kapodistrias (Greek: Αυγουστίνος Ιωάννης Μαρία Καποδίστριας; 1778–1857) was a Greek soldier and politician.

== Early life and family ==
He was born in Corfu. He studied geology.

Augustinos Kapodistrias was the younger brother of Viaros Kapodistrias and Ioannis Kapodistrias, the first governor of Greece.

== Political career ==
After the assassination of his brother Ioannis Kapodistrias on 9 October 1831, Augustinos succeeded him as head of the governing council, and in the office of governor. His six-month rule was marked by political instability and the country's slide to anarchy.

== Later life ==
On 28 March 1832, Augustinos took his brother's embalmed body, his correspondence, and some of his personal belongings, boarded a Russian frigate, and left for Corfu. From there, he travelled on to Saint Petersburg, where he settled, receiving a pension from the Russian government. On 16 July 1840, the Ionian States, under British protection, confirmed his noble title of Count Kapodistrias. He died in 1857 in St. Petersburg, leaving no descendants.

The remains of Ioannis and Augustinos Kapodistrias and their father now rest in the Monastery of Our Lady of the Sign in Corfu.

== Sources ==
- "Каподистрия, Август" . Brockhaus and Efron Encyclopedic Dictionary (in Russian). 1906.
- Ελένη Γαρδίκα-Κατσιαδάκη, Ο ρόλος της Διάσκεψης του Λονδίνου στην πτώση του Αυγουστίνου Καποδίστρια, Μνήμων 10 (1985), p. 248-269. (in Greek)

Political offices
Preceded by Ioannis Kapodistrias	Governor of Greece	Succeeded by Administrative Committee of Greece (1832)
