= Ioannis Kapodistrias =

Greek statesman and diplomat (1776–1831)

His Excellency Count Ioannis Kapodistrias
- Ιωάννης Καποδίστριας
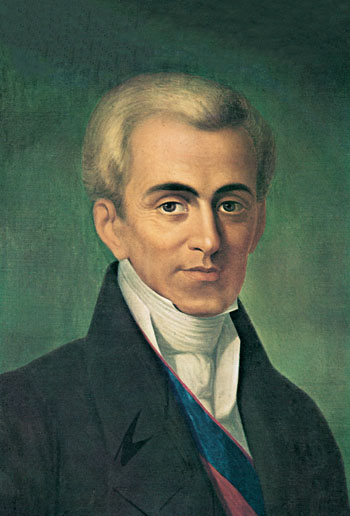
- Portrait by Dionysios Tsokos

Governor of Greece
- In office 18 January 1828 – 27 September 1831
- Preceded by: Vice-gubernatorial Committee of 1827; Andreas Zaimis (as President of the Provisional Administration of Greece)
- Succeeded by: Augustinos Kapodistrias

Foreign Minister of Russia
- In office 21 August 1816 – 8 August 1822 Serving with Karl Nesselrode
- Monarch: Alexander I
- Preceded by: Nikolay Rumyantsev
- Succeeded by: Karl Nesselrode

Personal details
- Born: 10 February 1776 Corfu, Ionian Islands, Venice
- Died: 27 September 1831 (aged 55) Nafplion, Greece
- Party: Russian Party
- Relations: Viaros Kapodistrias (brother); Augustinos Kapodistrias (brother)
- Education: University of Padua

Count Ioannis Antoniou Kapodistrias (Greek: Κόμης Ιωάννης Αντωνίου Καποδίστριας; (Note: romanized: Kómis Ioánnis Antoníou Kapodístrias; Russian: граф Иоанн Каподистрия, romanized: graf Ioann Kapodistriya; Italian: Giovanni Antonio Capodistria, Conte di Capo d'Istria) c. 10 February 1776 –27 September 1831), sometimes anglicized as John Capodistrias, was a Greek statesman who was one of the most distinguished politicians and diplomats of 19th-century Europe.

Kapodistrias's involvement in politics began as a minister of the Septinsular Republic in the early 19th century. He went on to serve as the foreign minister of the Russian Empire from 1816 until 1822, when he became increasingly active in supporting the Greek War of Independence that had broken out a year earlier.

After a long career in European politics and diplomacy, he was elected as the first head of state of independent Greece at the 1827 Third National Assembly at Troezen and served as the governor of Greece between 1828 and 1831. He is recognised as the founder of the modern Greek state, and the architect of Greek independence.

== Background and early career ==
Ioannis Kapodistrias was born to a distinguished family in Corfu, the most populous Ionian Island, then under Venetian rule.

Kapodistrias' father was Antonios Maria Kapodistrias (Αντώνιος Μαρία Καποδίστριας), a nobleman, artist, and politician. One of his ancestors had been made a conte (count) by Charles Emmanuel II, Duke of Savoy. In 1679, the title was inscribed in the Libro d'Oro of Corfu nobility. The coat of arms, a cyan shield with a diagonal strip, containing three stars and a cross, is on display in Corfu. The family originated in the city of Capodistria, also called Koper, in Slovenia, then part of the Republic of Venice. There, the family name was named Vitori or Vittori. They moved to Corfu in the 13th century, where they changed their denomination from Catholic to Orthodox and became completely hellenized. Origins of his ancestors can also be found in 1423 in Constantinople (with Victor/Vittor – or Nikiforos – Capodistrias).

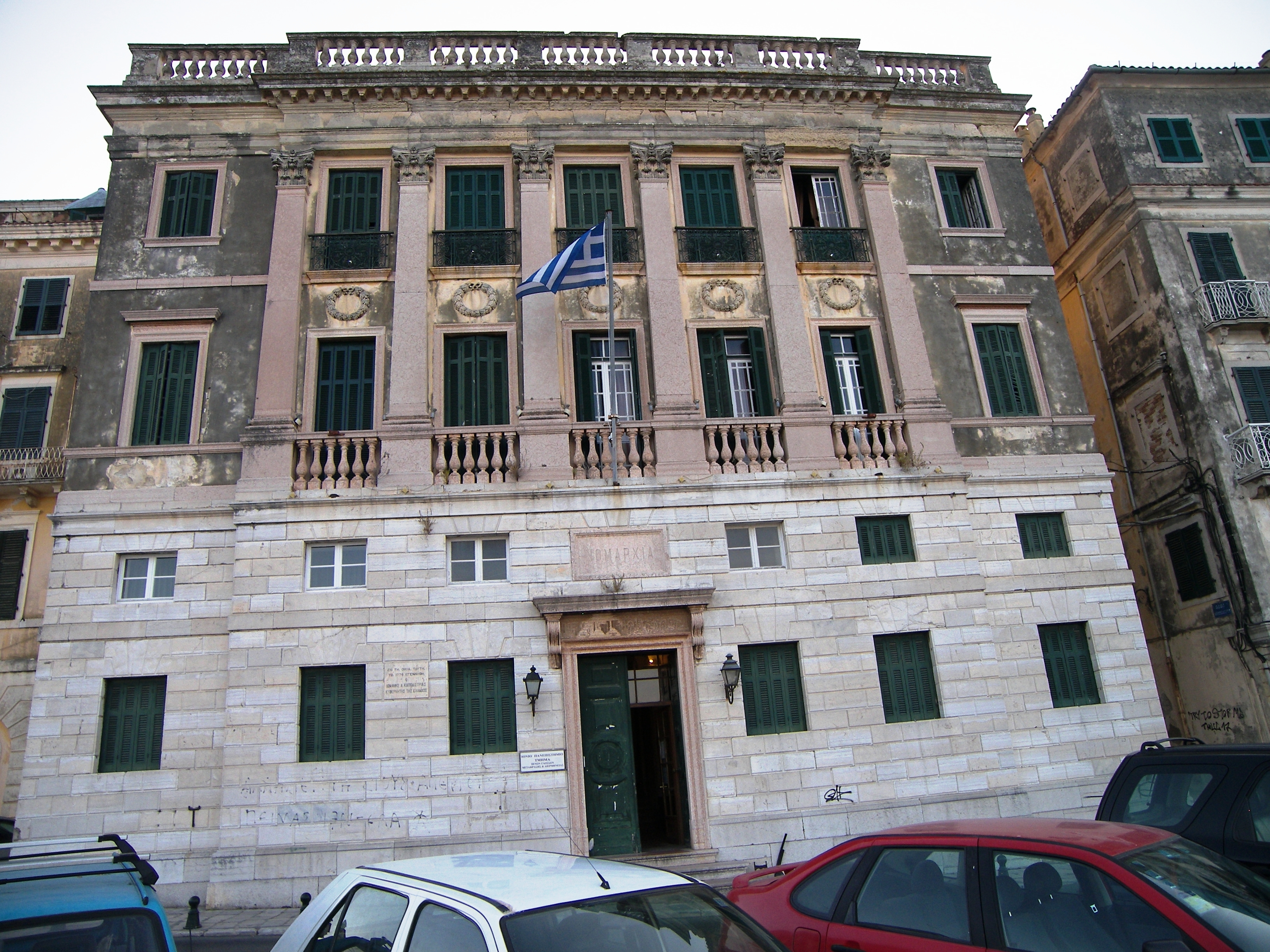
Kapodistrias family home in Corfu. The plaque between the two windows to the left of the entrance mentions he was born there.

Kapodistrias' mother was Adamantine Gonemis (Αδαμαντία "Διαμαντίνα" Γονέμη; Diamantina Gonemi), a countess. Her father was the noble Christodoulos Gonemis (Χριστόδουλος Γονέμης). The Gonemis family were originally Greek Cypriots. When Cyprus fell to the Ottomans in the 16th century, they migrated to the island of Crete. When Crete fell in the 17th century, they migrated to Epirus, near Argyrokastro. Later, they settled on the Ionian island of Corfu. During the Ottoman sieges of Corfu, they fought alongside the Venetians, who awarded them a title of nobility. Like the Kapodistrias family, they are listed in the Libro d'Oro (Golden Book) of Corfu.

Kapodistrias, though born and raised as a nobleman, was throughout his life a liberal thinker and had democratic ideals. He studied medicine, philosophy, and law at the University of Padua in 1795–1797. In 1797, at 21 years old, he started his medical practice on his native island of Corfu. In 1799, when Corfu was briefly occupied by the forces of Russia and Turkey, Kapodistrias was appointed chief medical director of the military hospital. In 1802 he founded an important scientific and social progress organisation in Corfu, the "National Medical Association", of which he was an energetic member.

Some scholars have suggested that Kapodistrias had a romantic affair with Roxandra Sturdza, prior to her marriage with Count Albert Cajetan von Edling in 1816.

== Minister of the Septinsular Republic ==
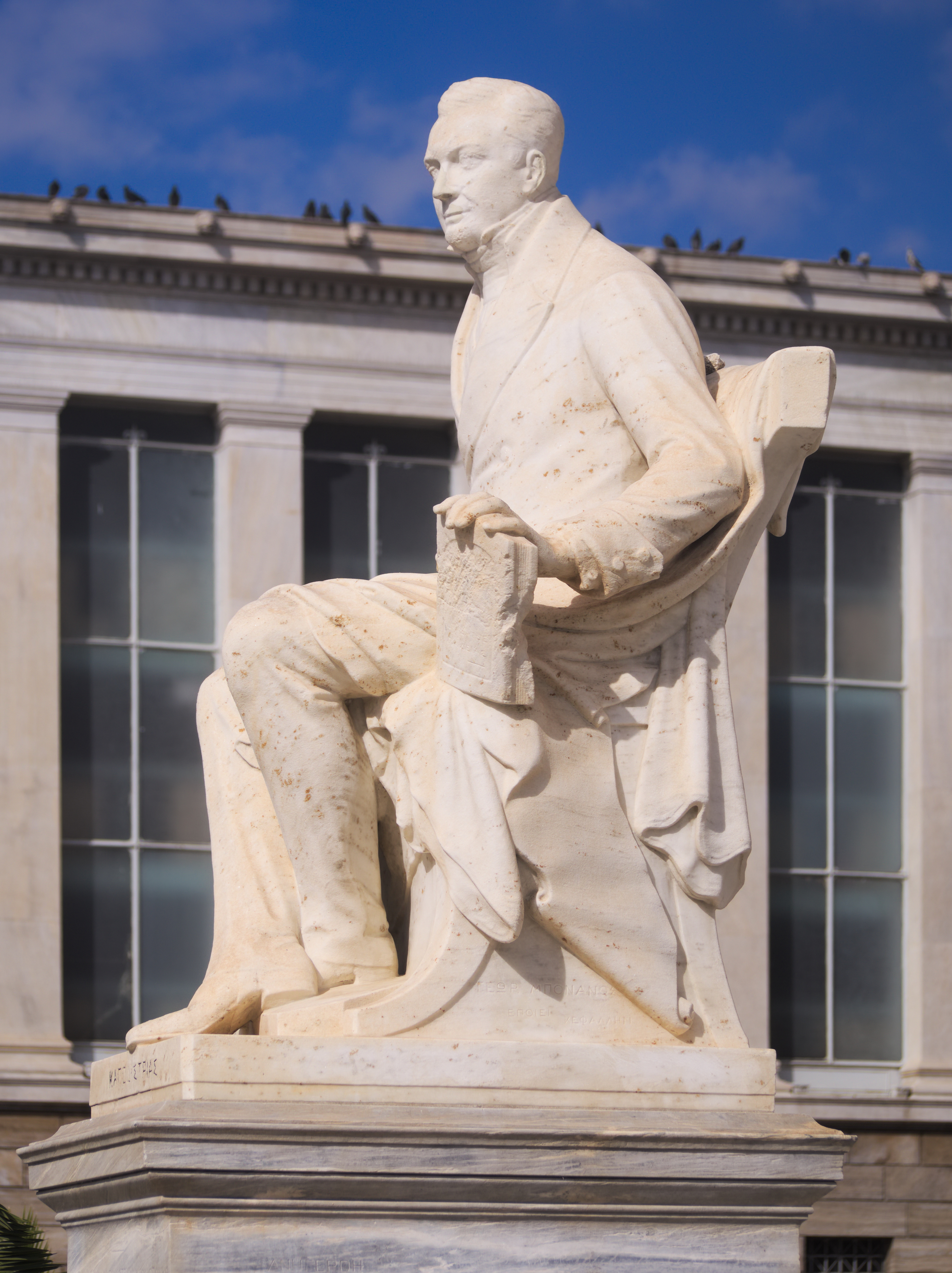
Statue of Ioannis Kapodistrias (by Georgios Bonanos) in Panepistimiou street, in front of the National and Kapodistrian University, Athens.

After two years of revolutionary freedom, triggered by the French Revolution and the ascendancy of Napoleon, in 1799 Russia and the Ottoman Empire drove the French out of the seven Ionian Islands and organised them as a free and independent state – the Septinsular Republic – ruled by its nobles. Kapodistrias, substituting for his father, became one of two ministers of the new state. Thus, at the age of 25, Kapodistrias became involved in politics. In Kefalonia he was successful in convincing the populace to remain united and disciplined to avoid foreign intervention. Through his use of argument and sheer courage, he faced and appeased rebellious opposition without conflict. With the same peaceful determination, he established authority in all seven islands.

Russia sent an envoy, Count George Mocenigo of Zakynthos (1762–1839), who had served as Russian Diplomat in Italy. Kapodistrias became his protégé. Mocenigo later helped Kapodistrias to join the Russian diplomatic service.

When elections were carried out for a new Ionian Senate, Kapodistrias was unanimously appointed Chief Minister of State. In December 1803, the Senate passed a new constitution, which was less feudal and more liberal and democratic. As minister of state, he organised the public sector, putting particular emphasis on education. In 1807, the French re-occupied the islands and dissolved the Septinsular Republic.

== Russian diplomatic service ==
In 1809 Kapodistrias entered the service of Alexander I of Russia. His first important mission, in November 1813, was as unofficial Russian ambassador to Switzerland, with the task of helping disentangle the country from the French dominance imposed by Napoleon. He secured Swiss unity, independence and neutrality, which were formally guaranteed by the Great Powers, and actively facilitated the initiation of a new federal constitution for the 19 cantons that were the component states of Switzerland, with personal drafts of the constitution.

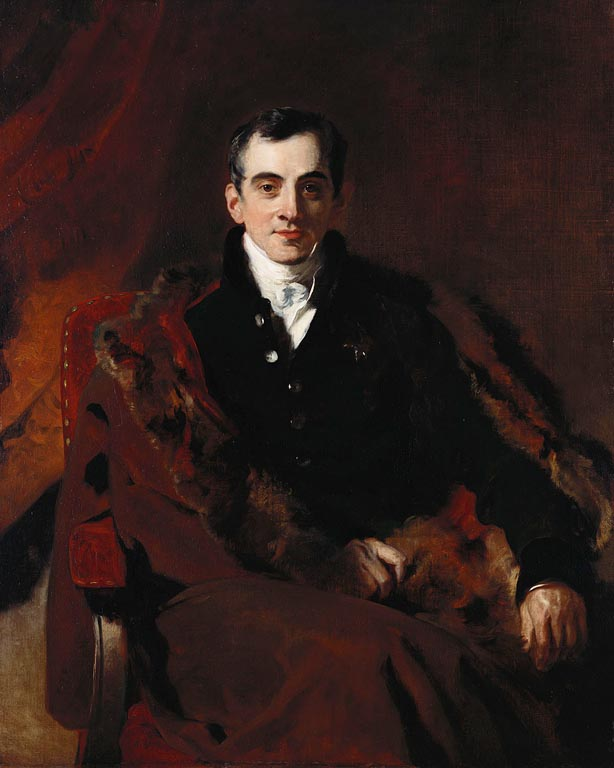
Portrait by Thomas Lawrence

Collaborating with Anthimos Gazis, in 1814 he founded in Vienna the "Philomuse Society", an educational organization promoting philhellenism, which included funding scholarships for Greeks in Europe.

In the ensuing Congress of Vienna, 1815, as the Russian minister, he counterbalanced the paramount influence of the Austrian minister, Prince Metternich, and insisted on French state unity under a Bourbon monarch. He also obtained new international guarantees for the constitution and neutrality of Switzerland through an agreement among the Powers. After these brilliant diplomatic successes, Alexander I appointed Kapodistrias joint Foreign Minister of Russia (with Karl Robert Nesselrode).

In the course of his assignment as Foreign Minister of Russia, Kapodistrias's ideas came to represent a progressive alternative to Metternich's aims of Austrian domination of European affairs. Kapodistrias's liberal ideas of a new European order so threatened Metternich that he wrote in 1819:

Kapodistrias is not a bad man, but honestly speaking he is a complete and thorough fool, a perfect miracle of wrong-headedness ... He lives in a world to which our minds are often transported by a bad nightmare.

— Metternich on Kapodistrias,

Realising that Kapodistrias's progressive vision was antithetical to his own, Metternich then tried to undermine Kapodistrias's position in the Russian court. Although Metternich was not a decisive factor in Kapodistrias's leaving his post as Russian Foreign Minister, he nevertheless attempted to actively undermine Kapodistrias by rumour and innuendo. According to the French ambassador to Saint Petersburg, Metternich was a master of insinuation, and he attempted to neutralise Kapodistrias, viewing him as the only man capable of counterbalancing Metternich's own influence with the Russian court.

More than anyone else he possesses the art of devaluing opinions that are not his own; the most honourable life, the purest intentions are not sheltered from his insinuations. It is thus with profound ingenuity that he knew how to neutralize the influence of Count Capodistrias, the only one who could counterbalance his own

— French ambassador on Metternich,

Metternich, by default, succeeded in the short term, since Kapodistrias eventually left the Russian court on his own, but with time, Kapodistrias's ideas and policies for a new European order prevailed. He was always keenly interested in the cause of his native country, and in particular the state of affairs in the Seven Islands, which in a few decades' time had passed from French revolutionary influence to Russian protection and then to British rule. He always tried to attract his Emperor's attention to matters Greek. In January 1817, an emissary from the Filiki Eteria, Nikolaos Galatis, arrived in St. Petersburg to offer Kapodistrias leadership of the movement for Greek independence. Kapodistrias rejected the offer, telling Galátis:

You must be out of your senses, Sir, to dream of such a project. No one could dare communicate such a thing to me in this house, where I have the honour to serve a great and powerful sovereign, except a young man like you, straight from the rocks of Ithaka, and carried away by some sort of blind passion. I can no longer continue this discussion of the objects of your mission, and I assure you that I shall never take note of your papers. The only advice I can give to you to is to tell nobody about them, to return immediately where you have come from, and to tell those who sent you that unless they want to destroy themselves and their innocent and unhappy nation with them, they must abandon their revolutionary course and continue to live as before under their present government until Providence decrees otherwise.

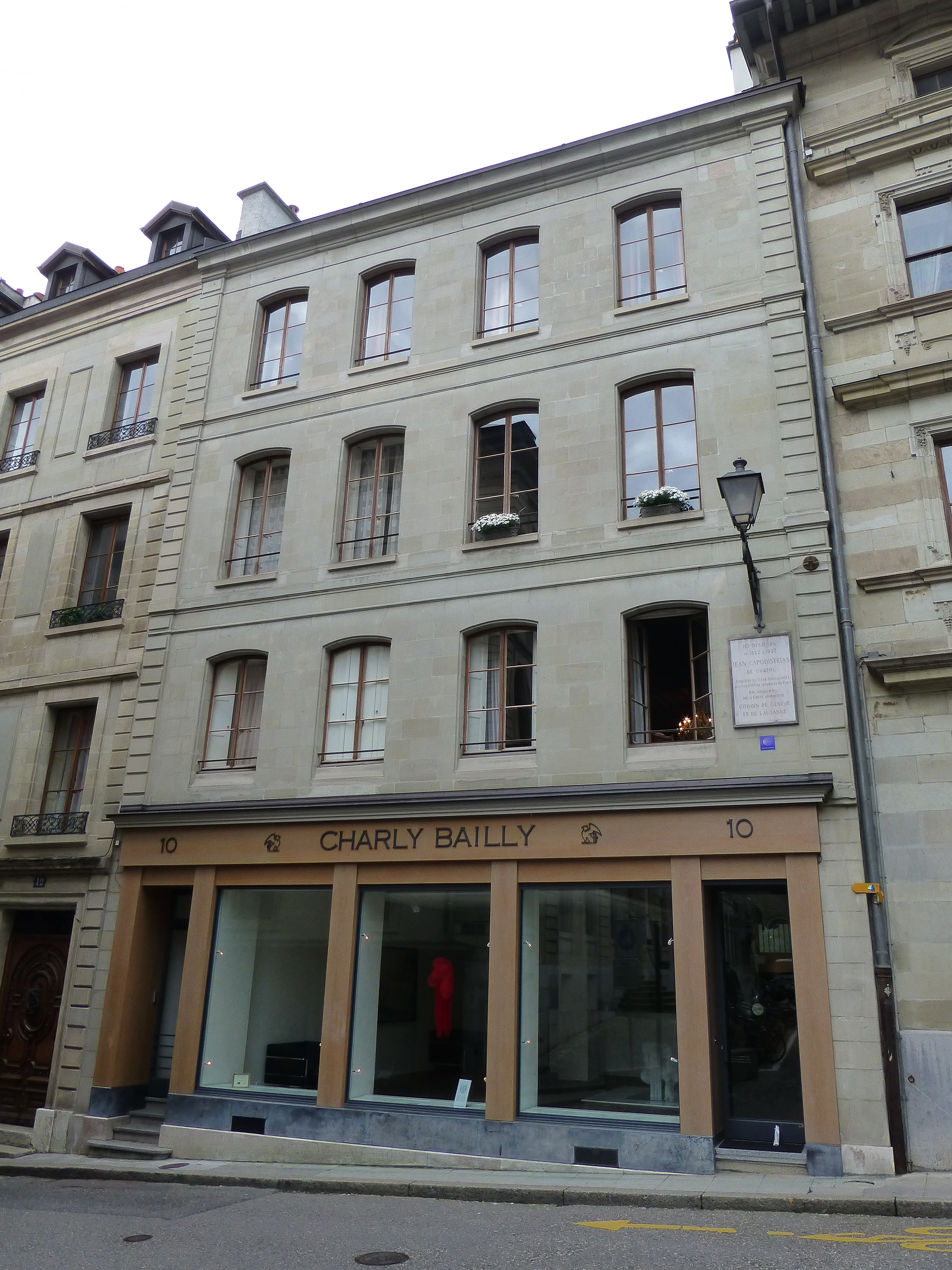
Residence of Kapodistrias in Geneva

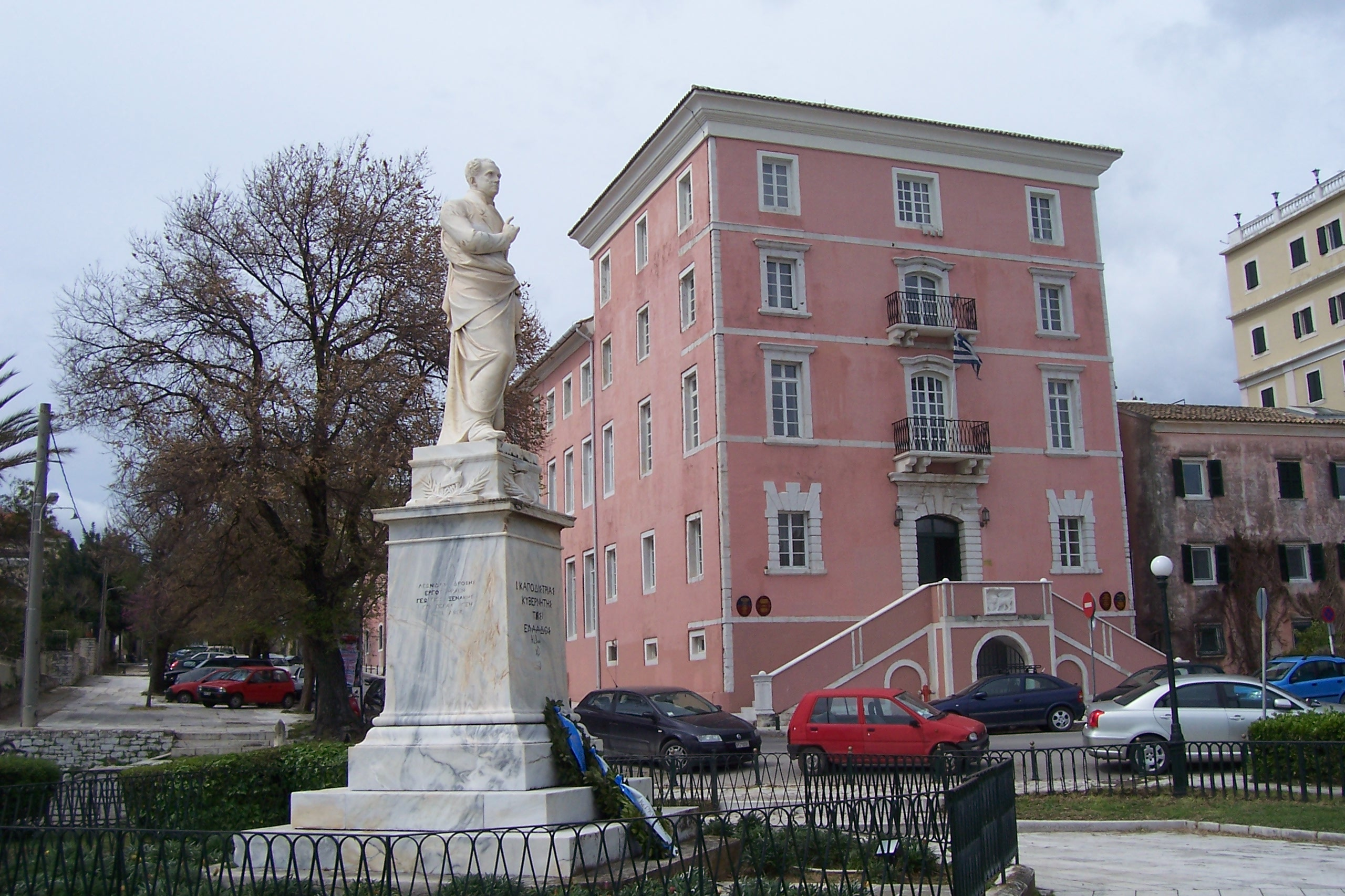
Statue of Kapodistrias in Corfu with the Ionian Academy in the background.

In December 1819, another emissary from the Filiki Eteria, Kamarinós, arrived in St. Petersburg, this time representing Petrobey Mavromichalis with a request that Russia support an uprising against the Ottomans. Kapodistrias wrote a long and careful letter, which while expressing support for Greek independence in theory, explained that at present it was not possible for Russia to support such an uprising and advised Mavromichalis to call off the revolution before it started. Still undaunted, one of the leaders of the Filiki Eteria, Emmanuel Xánthos arrived in St. Petersburg to again appeal to Kapodistrias to have Russia support the planned revolution and was again informed that the Russian Foreign Minister "... could not become involved for the above reasons and that if the arkhigoi knew of other means to carry out their objective, let them use them". When Prince Alexander Ypsilantis asked Kapodistrias to support the planned revolution, Kapodistrias advised against going ahead, saying: "Those drawing up such plans are most guilty and it is they who are driving Greece to calamity. They are wretched hucksters destroyed by their own evil conduct and now taking money from simple souls in the name of the fatherland they do not possess. They want you in their conspiracy to inspire trust in their operations. I repeat: be on your guard against these men". Kapodistrias visited his Ionian homeland, by then under British rule, in 1818, and in 1819 he went to London to discuss the islanders' grievances with the British government, but the British gave him the cold shoulder, partly because, uncharacteristically, he refused to show them the memorandum he wrote to Emperor Alexander I of Russia about the subject.

In 1821, when Kapodistrias learned that Prince Alexander Ypsilantis had invaded the Ottoman protectorate of Moldavia (modern north-eastern Romania) with the aim of provoking a general uprising in the Balkans against the Ottoman Empire, Kapodistrias was described as being "like a man struck by a thunderbolt". Emperor Alexander, committed to upholding the established order in Europe, had no interest in supporting a revolt against the Ottoman Empire, and it thus fell to Kapodistrias to draft a declaration in Alexander's name denouncing Ypsilantis for abandoning "the precepts of religion and morality", condemning him for his "obscure devices and shady plots", ordering him to leave Moldavia at once and announcing that Russia would offer him no support. As a fellow Greek, Kapodistrias found this document difficult to draft, but his sense of loyalty to Alexander outweighed his sympathy for Ypsilantis. On Easter Sunday, 22 April 1821, the Sublime Porte had the Patriarch Grigorios V publicly hanged in Constantinople at the gate of his residence in Phanar. This, together with other news that the Ottomans were killing Orthodox priests, led Alexander to have Kapodistrias draft an ultimatum accusing the Ottomans of having trampled on the rights of their Orthodox subjects, of breaking treaties, insulting the Orthodox churches everywhere by hanging the Patriarch and of threatening "to disturb the peace that Europe has bought at so great a sacrifice". Kapodistrias ended his ultimatum:

"The Ottoman government has placed itself in a state of open hostility against the Christian world; that it has legitimized the defense of the Greeks, who would thenceforth be fighting to save themselves from inevitable destruction; and that in view of the nature of that struggle, Russia would find herself strictly obliged to offer them help because they were persecuted; protection, because they would be in need of it; assistance, jointly with the whole of Christendom; because she could not surrender her brothers in religion to the mercy of a blind fanaticism".

As the Sublime Porte declined to answer the Russian ultimatum within the seven day period allowed after it was presented by the ambassador Baron Georgii Stroganov on 18 July 1821, Russia broke off diplomatic relations with the Ottoman Empire. Kapodistrias became increasingly active in support of Greek independence from the Ottoman Empire, but did not succeed in obtaining Alexander I's support for the Greek revolution of 1821. This put Kapodistrias in an untenable situation and in 1822 he took an extended leave of absence from his position as Foreign Minister and retired to Geneva where he applied himself to supporting the Greek revolution by organising material and moral support.

== Return to Greece and the Hellenic State ==
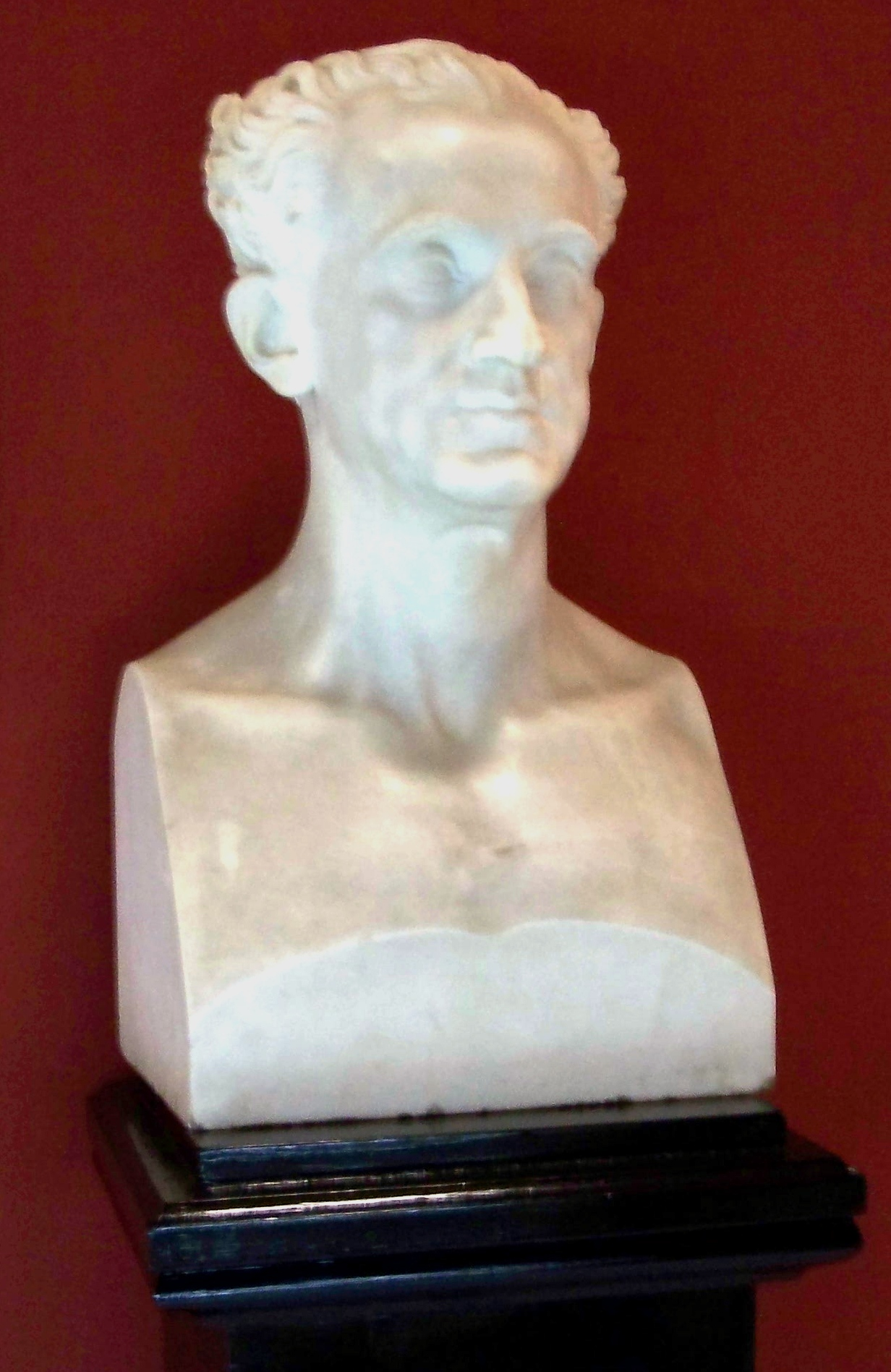
Bust of Ioannis Kapodistrias, National Historical Museum, Athens.

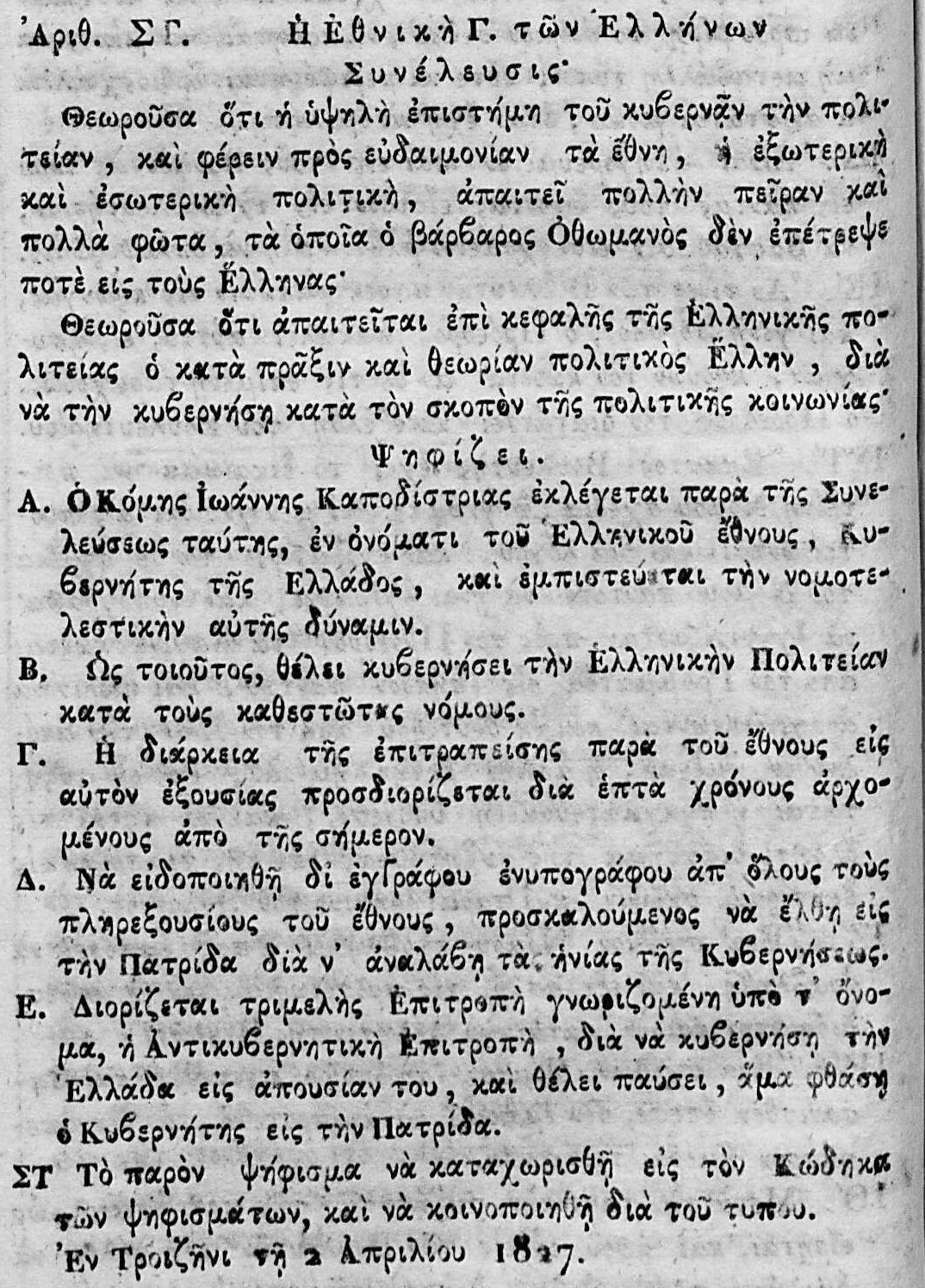
The election of Kapodistrias at the Third National Assembly at Troezen

Kapodistrias moved to Geneva, where he was greatly esteemed, having been made an Honorary Citizen for his past services to Swiss unity and particularly to the cantons. In 1827, he learned that the newly formed Greek National Assembly had, as he was the most illustrious Greek-born statesman in Europe, elected him as the first head of state of newly liberated Greece, with the title of Kyvernetes (Κυβερνήτης – Governor) for a seven-year term. A visitor to Kapodistrias in Geneva described him thus: "If there is to be found anywhere in the world an innate nobility, marked by a distinction of appearance, innocence, and intelligence in the eyes, a graceful simplicity of manner, a natural elegance of expression in any language, no one could be more intrinsically aristocratic than Count Capo d'Istria [Kapodistrias] of Corfu". Under the aristocratic veneer, Kapodistrias was an intense workaholic, a driven man and "an ascetic bachelor" who worked from dawn until late at night without a break, a loner whom few really knew well. Despite his work ethic, Kapodistrias had what the British historian David Brewer called an air of "melancholy fatalism" about him. Kapodistrias once wrote about the cause of Greek freedom that "Providence will decide and it will be for the best".

After touring Europe to rally support for the Greek cause, Kapodistrias landed in Nafplion on 7 January 1828, and arrived in Aegina on 8 January 1828. The British didn't allow him to pass from his native Corfu (a British protectorate since 1815 as part of the United States of the Ionian Islands) fearing a possible unrest of the population. It was the first time he had ever set foot on the Greek mainland, and he found a discouraging situation there. Even while fighting against the Ottomans continued, factional and dynastic conflicts had led to two civil wars, which ravaged the country. Greece was bankrupt, and the Greeks were unable to form a united national government. Wherever Kapodistrias went, in Greece, he was enthusiastically welcomed by large crowds.

Kapodistrias asked the Senate to give him full executive powers and to have the constitution suspended while the Senate was to be replaced with a Panhellenion, whose 27 members were all to be appointed by the governor. All requests were granted. Kapodistrias promised to call a National Assembly for April 1828. But, in fact, it took 18 months for the National Assembly to meet.

He declared the foundation of the Hellenic State and from the first capital of Greece, Nafplion, he ushered in a new era in the country, which had just been liberated from centuries of Ottoman occupation. In September 1828, Kapodistrias at first restrained General Richard Church from advancing into the Roumeli, hoping that the French would intervene instead. However, a French presence in Central Greece was refused and caused a veto by the British, who favoured the creation of a smaller Greek state, mainly in Peloponnese (Morea). The new British ambassador Edward Dawkins and admiral Malcolm asked from Kapodistrias to retreat the Greek forces to Morea, but he refused to do so and abandon central Greece.

Kapodistrias ordered Church and Ypsilantis to resume their advance, and by April 1829, the Greek forces had taken all of Greece up to the village of Kommeno Artas and the Makrinóros mountains. Kapodistrias insisted on involving himself closely in military operations, much to the intense frustration of his generals. General Ypsilantis was incensed when Kapodistrias visited his camp to accuse him to his face of incompetence, and later refused a letter from him, stating that it was "a monstrous and unacceptable communication". Church was attacked by Kapodistrias for being insufficiently aggressive, as the governor wanted him to conquer as much land as possible, to create a situation that would favor the Greek claims at the conference tables of London. In February 1829, Kapodistrias made his brother Agostino lieutenant-plenipotentiary of Roumeli, with control over pay, rations and equipment, and a final say over Ypsilantis and Church. Church wrote to Kapodistrias: "Let me ask you seriously to think of the position of a General in Chief of an Army before the enemy who has not the authority to order a payment of a sou, or the delivery of a ration of bread". Kapodistrias also appointed another brother, Viaro, to rule over the islands off eastern Greece, and sent a letter to the Hydriots reading: "Do not examine the actions of the government and do not pass judgement on them, because to do so can lead you into error, with harmful consequences to you".

== Administration ==
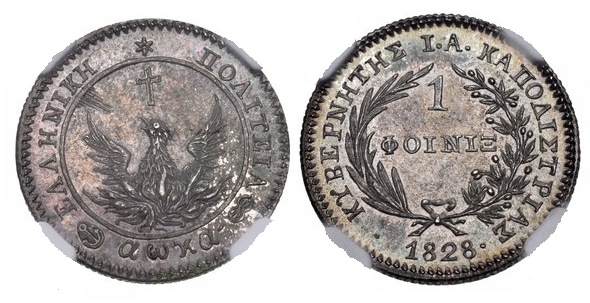
The phoenix, the first currency of the modern Greek State

The most important task facing the governor of Greece was to forge a modern state and, with it, a civil society. Kapodistrias worked long hours — from 5 am until 10 pm daily. Upon his arrival, Kapodistrias launched a major reform and modernisation programme that covered all areas. Kapodistrias distrusted the men who led the war of independence, believing them all to be self-interested, petty men, whose only concern was power for themselves. He saw himself as the champion of the common people, long oppressed by the Ottomans, but also believed that the Greek people were not ready for democracy. He said that, to give the Greeks democracy at present would be like giving a boy a razor; the boy did not need the razor and could easily kill himself, as he did not know to use it properly. Kapodistrias argued that the Greek people initially needed an enlightened autocracy, to lift the nation out of the backwardness and poverty caused by the Ottomans. Once a generation or two had passed, with the Greeks educated and owning private property, democracy could then be established. Kapodistrias's role model was Emperor Alexander I of Russia who, Kapodistrias argued, had been gradually moving Russia towards Western European norms but died before finishing this work.

Kapodistrias often expressed his feelings towards the other Greek leaders in harsh language. At one point, he said he would crush the revolutionary leaders: "Il faut éteindre les brandons de la revolution". The Greek politician Spyridon Trikoupis wrote: "He [Kapodistrias] called the primates, Turks masquerading under Christian names; the military chiefs, brigands; the Phanariots, vessels of Satan; and the intellectuals, fools. Only the peasants and the artisans did he consider worthy of his love and protection, and he openly declared that his administration was conducted solely for their benefit". Trikoúpis described Kapodistrias as átolmos (cautious), a man who liked to move methodically and carefully with as little risk as possible, which led him to micro-manage the government by attempting to be the "minister of everything" as Kapodistrias only trusted himself to govern properly. Kapodistrias alienated many in the Greek elite with his haughty, high-handed manner together with his open contempt for the Greek elites, but he attracted support from several of the captains, such as Theodoros Kolokotronis and Yannis Makriyannis who provided the necessary military force to back up Kapodistrias's decisions. Kapodistrias, an elegant, urbane diplomat, educated in Padua and accustomed to the polite society of Europe, formed an unlikely but deep friendship with Kolokotronis, a man of peasant origins and a former klepht (bandit). Kolokotronis described Kapodistrias as the only man capable of being president, as he was not tied to any of the Greek factions. He admired Kapodistrias for his concern for the common people, who had suffered so much in the war, and liked Kapodistrias's interest in getting things done, regardless of legal niceties. As Greece had no means of raising taxes, money was always in short supply. Kapodistrias was constantly writing letters to his friend, the Swiss banker Jean-Gabriel Eynard, asking for yet another loan. As a former Russian foreign minister, Kapodistrias was well connected to the European elite and he attempted to use his connections to secure loans for the new Greek state and to achieve the most favorable borders for Greece, which were being debated by Russian, French, and British diplomats.

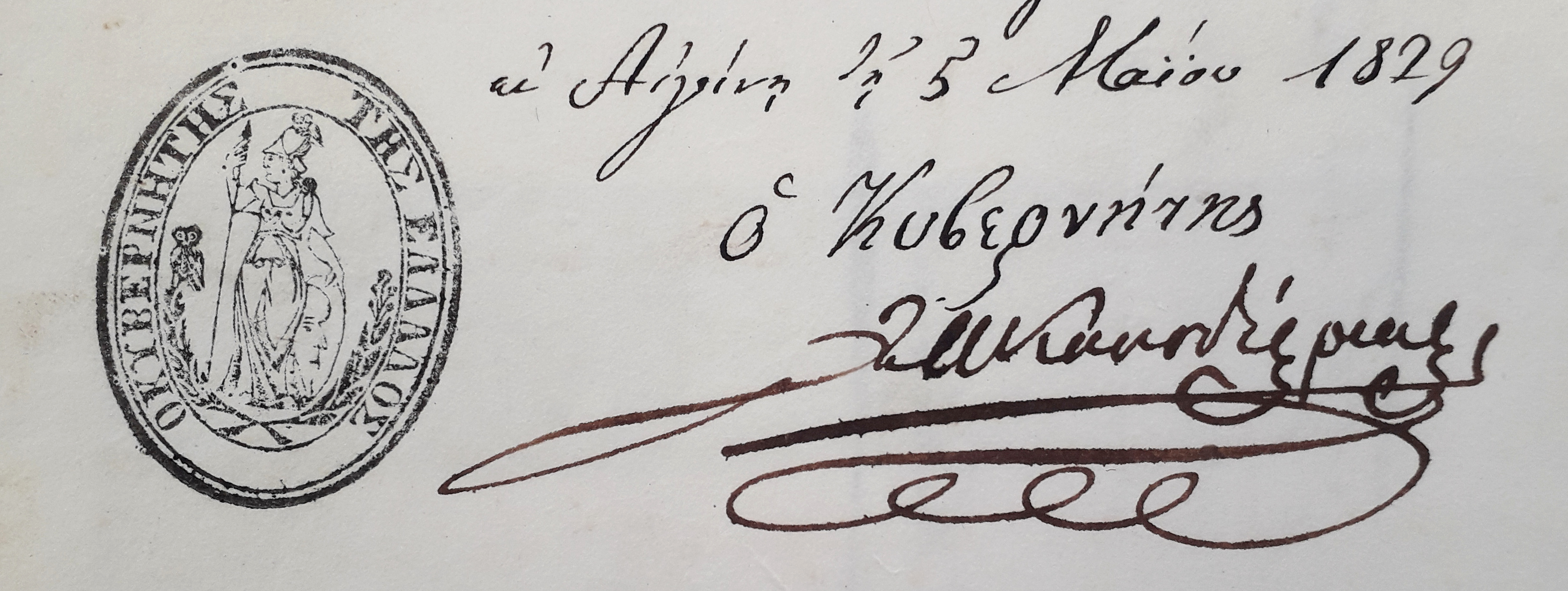
Seal and signature of Ioannis Kapodistrias (1829)

Kapodistrias re-established military unity, ending fractures, and re-organised the military, establishing regular Army corps in the war against the Ottomans, taking advantage also of the Russo-Turkish War (1828–29). The new Hellenic Army was then able to reconquer much territory lost to the Ottoman army during the civil wars. The Battle of Petra, in September 1829, ended military operations and secured Greek dominion in Central Greece. He supported also two unfortunate naval expeditions, to Chios and to Crete, but the Great powers decided that these islands were not to be included within the borders of the new state.

He adopted the Byzantine Hexabiblos of Armenopoulos as an interim civil code, he founded the Panellinion, as an advisory body, and a Senate, the first Hellenic Military Academy, hospitals, orphanages and schools for the children, introduced new agricultural techniques, while he showed interest for the establishment of the first national museums and libraries. In 1830 he granted legal equality to Jews in the new state; being one of the first European states to do so.

Interested in urban planning for the destroyed Greek cities after the war, he assigned Stamatis Voulgaris to present a new urban plan for the cities of Patras, Argos, such as the Prónoia quarter in Nafplio as settlement for war refugees.

He introduced also the first modern quarantine system in Greece, which brought epidemics like typhoid fever, cholera, and dysentery under control for the first time since the start of the War of Independence; negotiated with the Great Powers and the Ottoman Empire the borders and the degree of independence of the Greek state and signed the peace treaty that ended the War of Independence with the Ottomans; introduced the phoenix, the first modern Greek currency; organised local administration; and, in an effort to raise the living standards of the population, introduced the cultivation of the potato into Greece. According to legend, although Kapodistrias ordered that potatoes be handed out to anyone interested, the population was reluctant at first to take advantage of the offer. The legend continues, that he then ordered that the whole shipment of potatoes be unloaded on public display on the docks of Nafplion, and placed it under guard to make the people believe that they were valuable. Soon, people would gather to look at the guarded potatoes and some started to steal them. The guards had been ordered in advance to turn a blind eye to such behaviour, and soon the potatoes had all been "stolen" and Kapodistrias's plan to introduce them to Greece had succeeded.

Furthermore, as part of his programme, he tried to undermine the authority of the traditional clans or dynasties which he considered the useless legacy of a bygone and obsolete era. However, he underestimated the political and military strength of the capetanei (καπεταναίοι – commanders) who had led the revolt against the Ottoman Turks in 1821, and who had expected a leadership role in the post-revolution Government. When a dispute between the capetanei of Laconia and the appointed governor of the province escalated into an armed conflict, he called in Russian troops to restore order, because much of the army was controlled by capetanei who were part of the rebellion.

== Opposition and the Battle of Poros ==
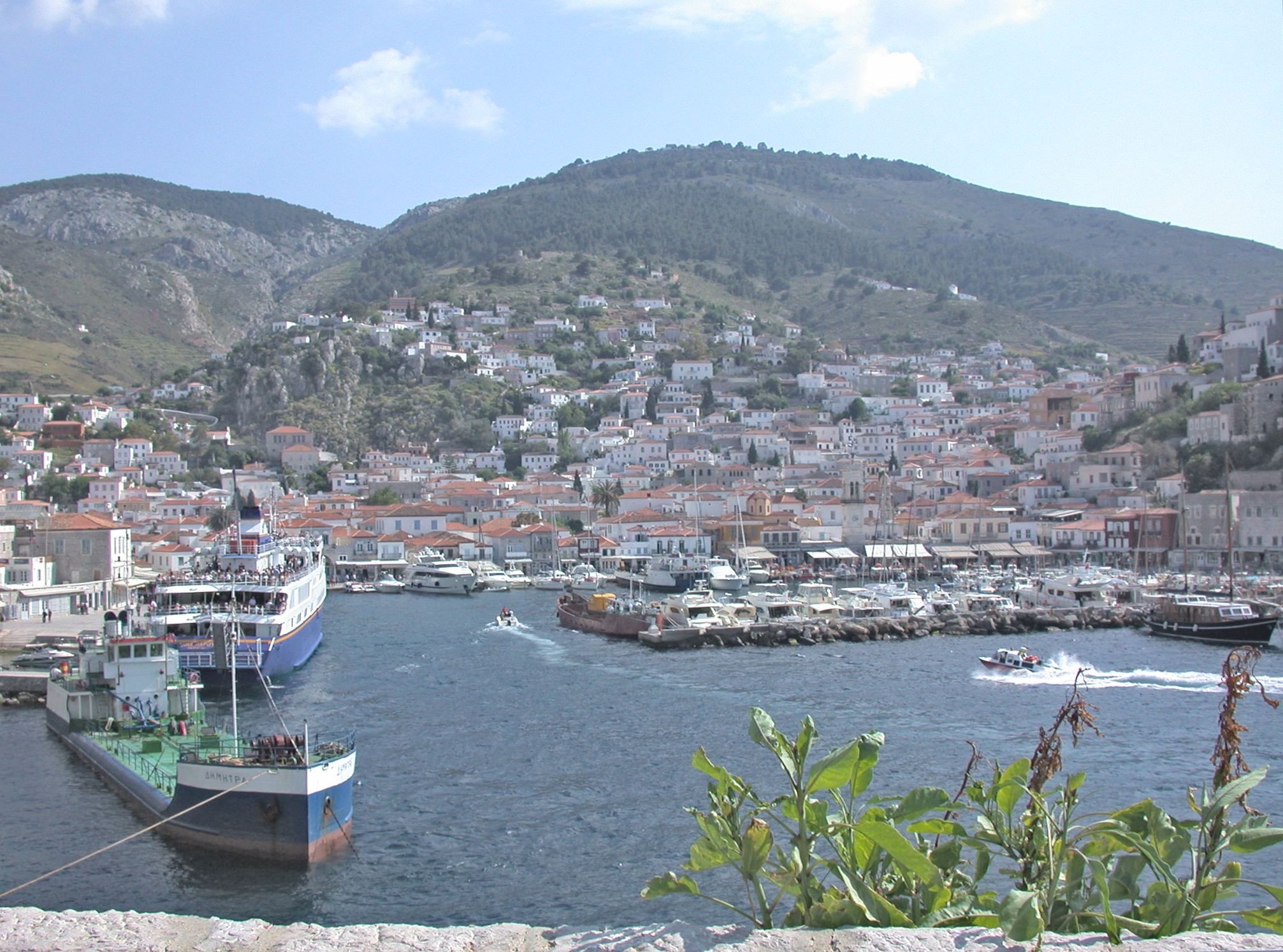
Hydra became one of the centers of the opposition to the Kapodistrias's policies

George Finlay's 1861 History of Greek Revolution records that by 1831 Kapodistrias's government had become hated, chiefly by the independent Maniates, but also by part of the Roumeliotes and the rich and influential merchant families of Hydra, Spetses and Psara. Their interests gradually were identified with the English policy and the most influential of them formed the core of the so-called English Party.

The French stance, which was in general moderate towards Kapodistrias, became more hostile after the July Revolution in 1830.

The Hydriots' customs dues were the chief source of the municipalities' revenue, so they refused to hand these over to Kapodistrias. It appears that Kapodistrias had refused to convene the National Assembly and was ruling as a despot, possibly influenced by his Russian experiences. The municipality of Hydra instructed Admiral Miaoulis and Mavrocordatos to go to Poros and to seize the Hellenic Navy's fleet there. This Miaoulis did, the intention being to prevent a blockade of the islands, so for a time it seemed as if the National Assembly would be called.

Kapodistrias called on the British and French corps to support him in putting down the rebellion, but they refused to do so, and only the Russian Admiral Pyotr Ivanovich Ricord took his ships north to Poros. Colonel (later General) Kallergis took a half-trained force of Hellenic Army regulars and a force of irregulars in support. With less than 200 men, Miaoulis was unable to make much of a fight; Fort Heideck on Bourtzi Island was overrun by the regulars and the corvette Spetses (once Laskarina Bouboulina's Agamemnon) was sunk by Ricord's force. Encircled by the Russians in the harbor and by Kallergis's force on land, Poros surrendered. Miaoulis was forced to set charges in the flagship Hellas and in the corvette Hydra, blowing them up, when he and his handful of followers returned to Hydra. Kallergis's men were enraged by the loss of the ships and sacked Poros, carrying off plunder to Nafplion.

The loss of the best ships in the fleet crippled the Hellenic Navy for many years, but it also weakened Kapodistrias's position. He did finally call the National Assembly but his other actions triggered more opposition, leading to his downfall.

== Assassination ==
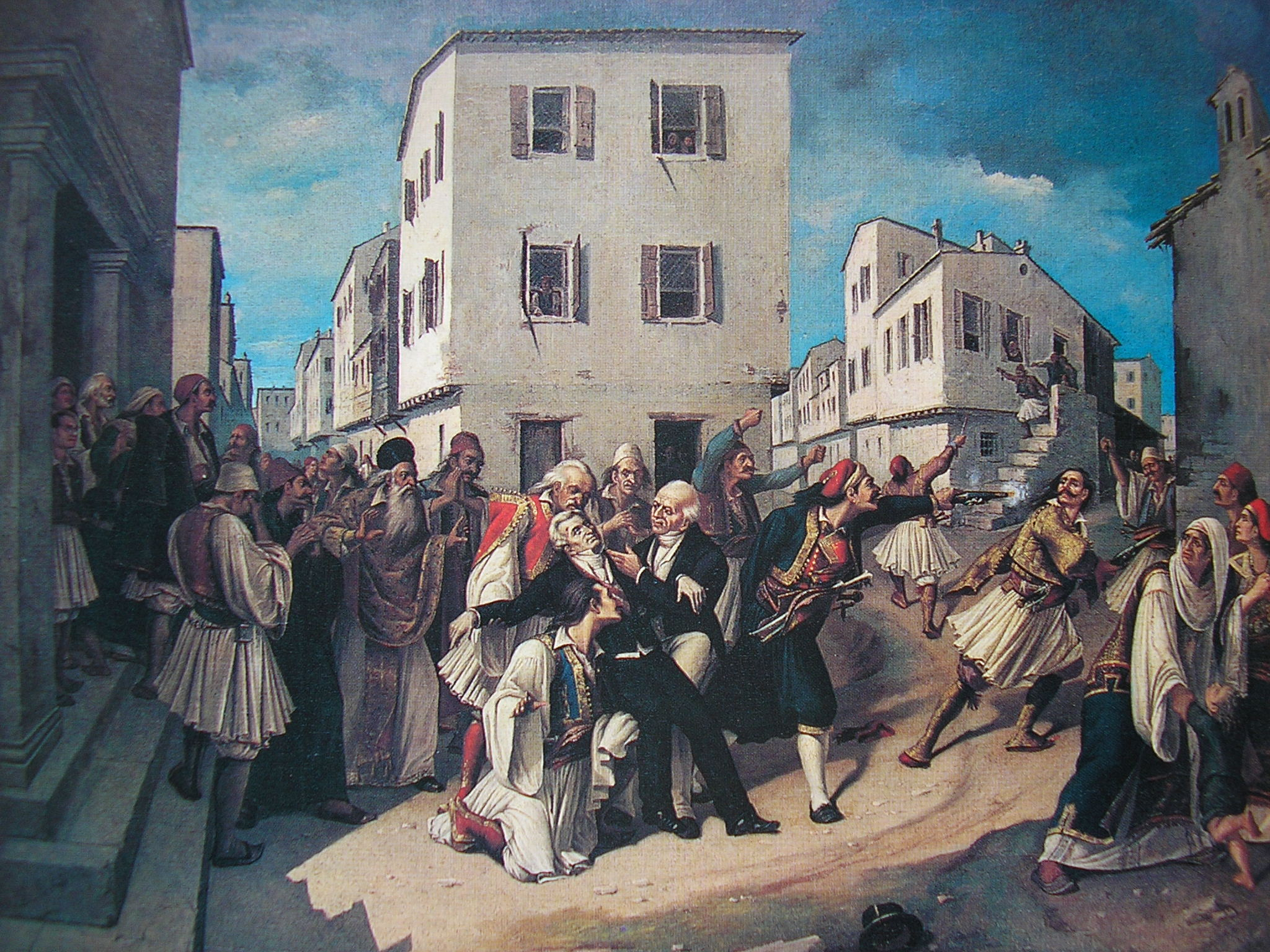
The murder of Kapodistrias by Charalambos Pachis.

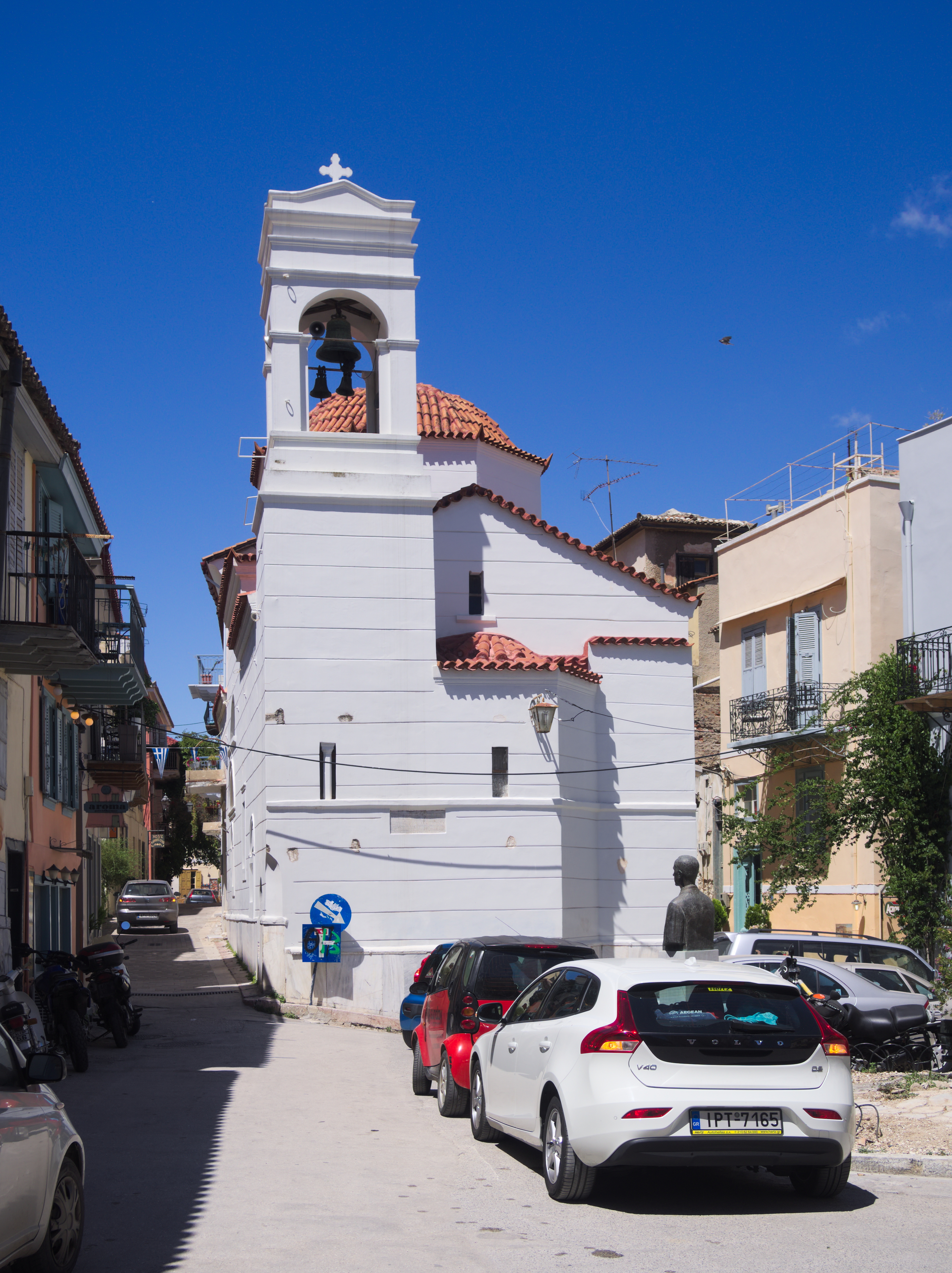
St Spyridon church in Nafplion, murder site of Kapodistrias

In 1831, Kapodistrias ordered the imprisonment of Petrobey Mavromichalis, who had been the leader of the successful uprising against the Turks. Mavromichalis was the Bey of the Mani Peninsula, one of the wildest and most rebellious parts of Greece – the only section that had retained its independence from the Ottoman Empire and whose resistance had spearheaded the successful revolution. The arrest of their patriarch was a mortal offence to the Mavromichalis family and, on September 27, Petrobey's brother Konstantis and son Georgios Mavromichalis determined to kill Kapodistrias that morning at the Church of Saint Spyridon in Nafplion.

Kapodistrias woke up early in the morning and decided to attend mass, although his servants and bodyguards urged him to stay home. When he reached the church, he saw his assassins waiting. When he reached the church steps, Konstantis and Georgios came close, as if to greet him. Suddenly, Konstantis drew his pistol and fired, missing, the bullet sticking in the church wall, where it is still visible today. Georgios plunged his dagger into Kapodistrias's chest while Konstantis shot him in the head. Konstantis was shot by General Fotomaras, who watched the murder scene from his own window. Georgios managed to escape and hide in the French Embassy. After a few days, he surrendered to the Greek authorities. He was sentenced to death by a court-martial and was executed by firing squad. His last wish was that the firing squad not shoot his face. His last words were "Peace Brothers!"

Ioannis Kapodistrias was succeeded as Governor by his younger brother, Augustinos Kapodistrias. Augustinos ruled for six months, during which the country was plunged into chaos. Subsequently, King Otto was given the throne of the newly founded Kingdom of Greece.

== Legacy and honours ==
=== Greece ===
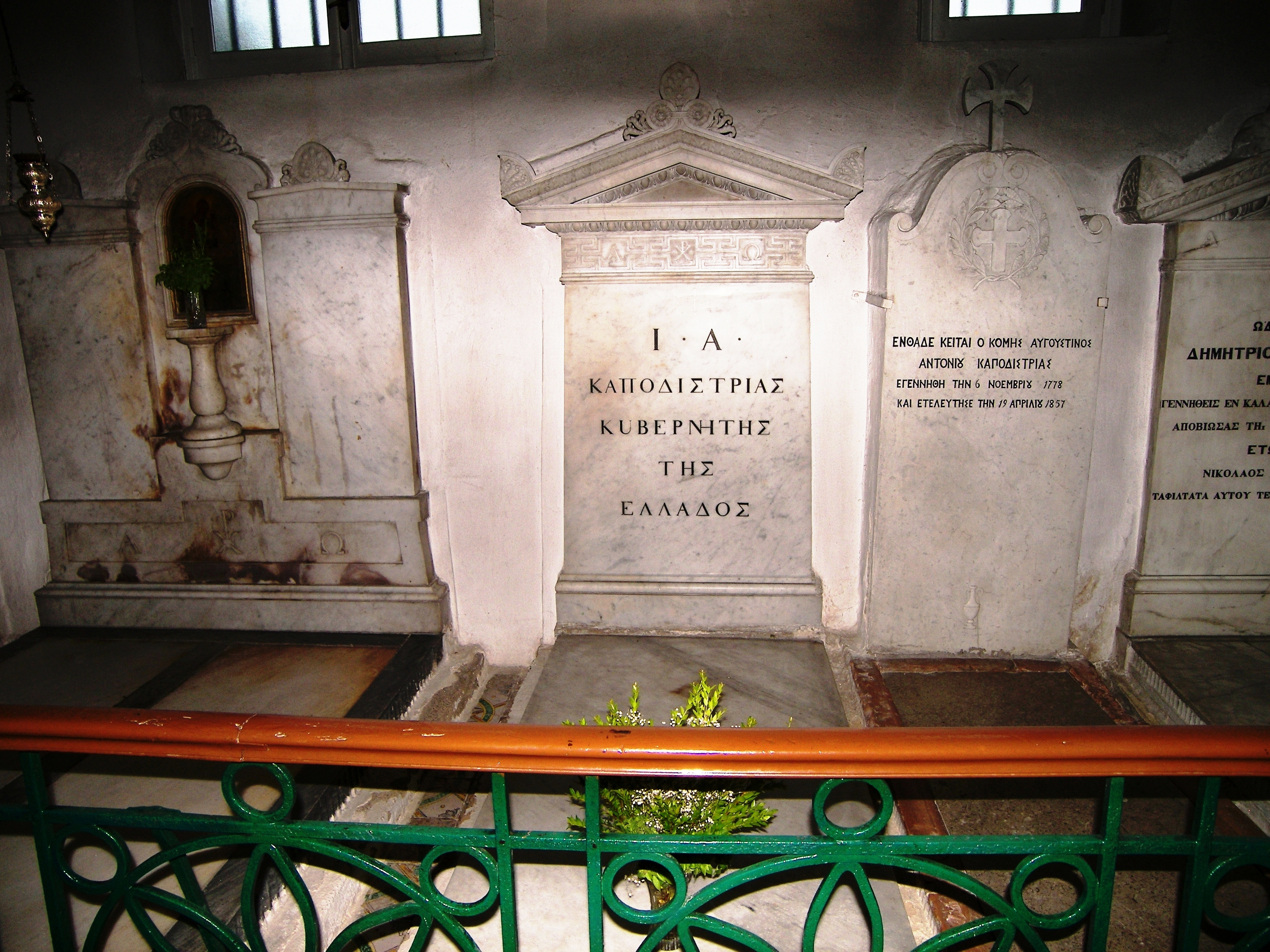
Kapodistrias's grave at the Platytera Monastery of Corfu. To the right is the grave of his brother Augustinos.

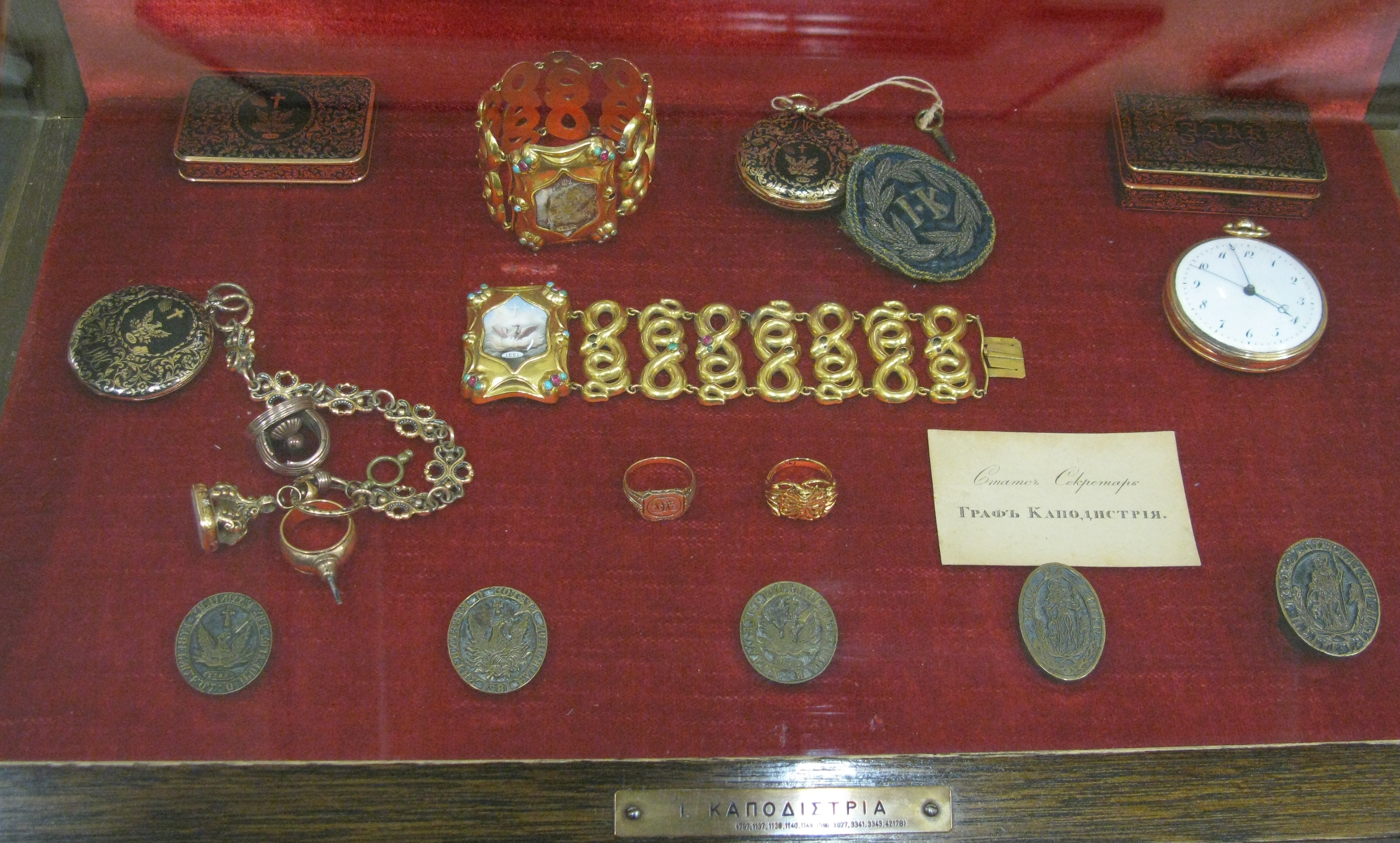
Personal items at the National Historical Museum, Athens

Kapodistrias is greatly honoured in Greece today. In 1944 Nikos Kazantzakis wrote the play "Capodistria" in his honour. It is a tragedy in three acts and was performed at the Greek National Theatre in 1946 to celebrate the anniversary of 25 March. The University of Athens is named "Kapodistrian" in his honour; the Greek euro coin of 20 cent bears his face and name, as did the obverse of the 500 drachmas banknote of 1983–2001, before the introduction of the euro. A major administrative reform of the late 1990s, which reduced the number of municipalities, is named the Kapodistrias reform. The fears that Britain, France, and Russia had of any liberal and Republican movement at the time, because of the Reign of Terror in the French Revolution, led them to insist on Greece becoming a monarchy after Kapodistrias's death. His summer home in Koukouritsa, Corfu, was converted to a museum that commemorates his life and accomplishments. It was donated by his late grand niece Maria Desylla-Kapodistria, to three cultural societies in Corfu specifically for the aforementioned purpose. Society – Political Party of the Successors of Kapodistrias was a political party in Greece from 2008 to 2020.

=== Slovenia ===
On 8 December 2001 in the city Capodistria (Koper) of Slovenia a lifesize statue of Ioannis Kapodistrias was unveiled in the central square of the municipality. The square was renamed after Kapodistrias, since Koper was the place of Kapodistrias's ancestors before they moved to Corfu in the 14th century. The statue was created by Greek sculptor K. Palaiologos and was transported to Koper by a Greek naval vessel. The ceremony was attended by the Greek ambassador and by Eleni Koukou, a scholar on Kapodistrias, and professor at the National and Kapodistrian University of Athens.

While meeting the Economy minister of Slovenia, Andrej Vizjak, on 24 April 2007, the Greek minister for Development, Dimitris Sioufas, mentioned: "Greece has a special sentimental reason for these relations with Slovenia, because the family of Ioannis Kapodistrias, the first Governor of Greece, hails from Koper of Slovenia. And this is especially important for us."

=== Switzerland ===
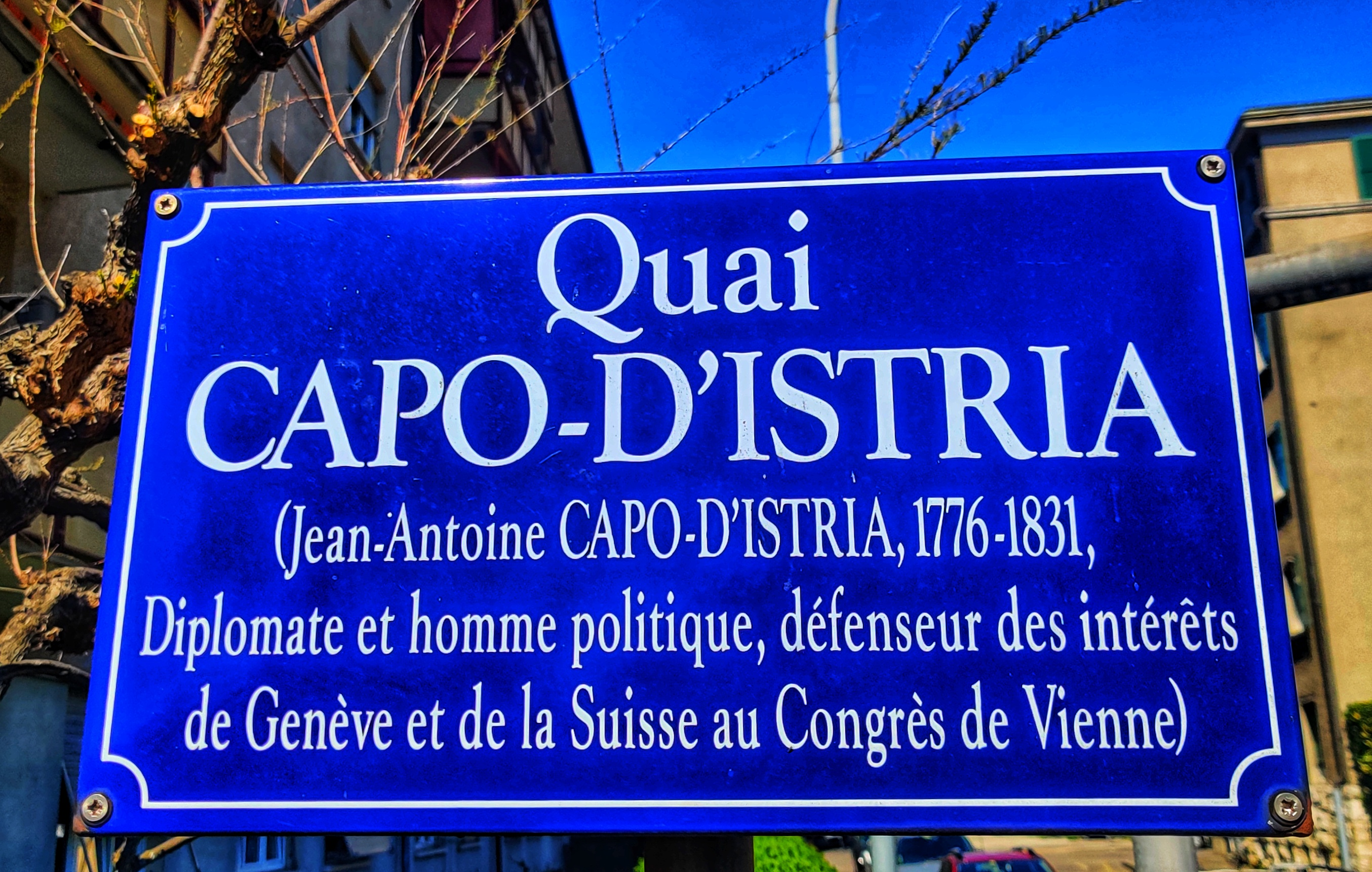
Road sign at the Quai Capo-d'Istria in Geneva, Switzerland

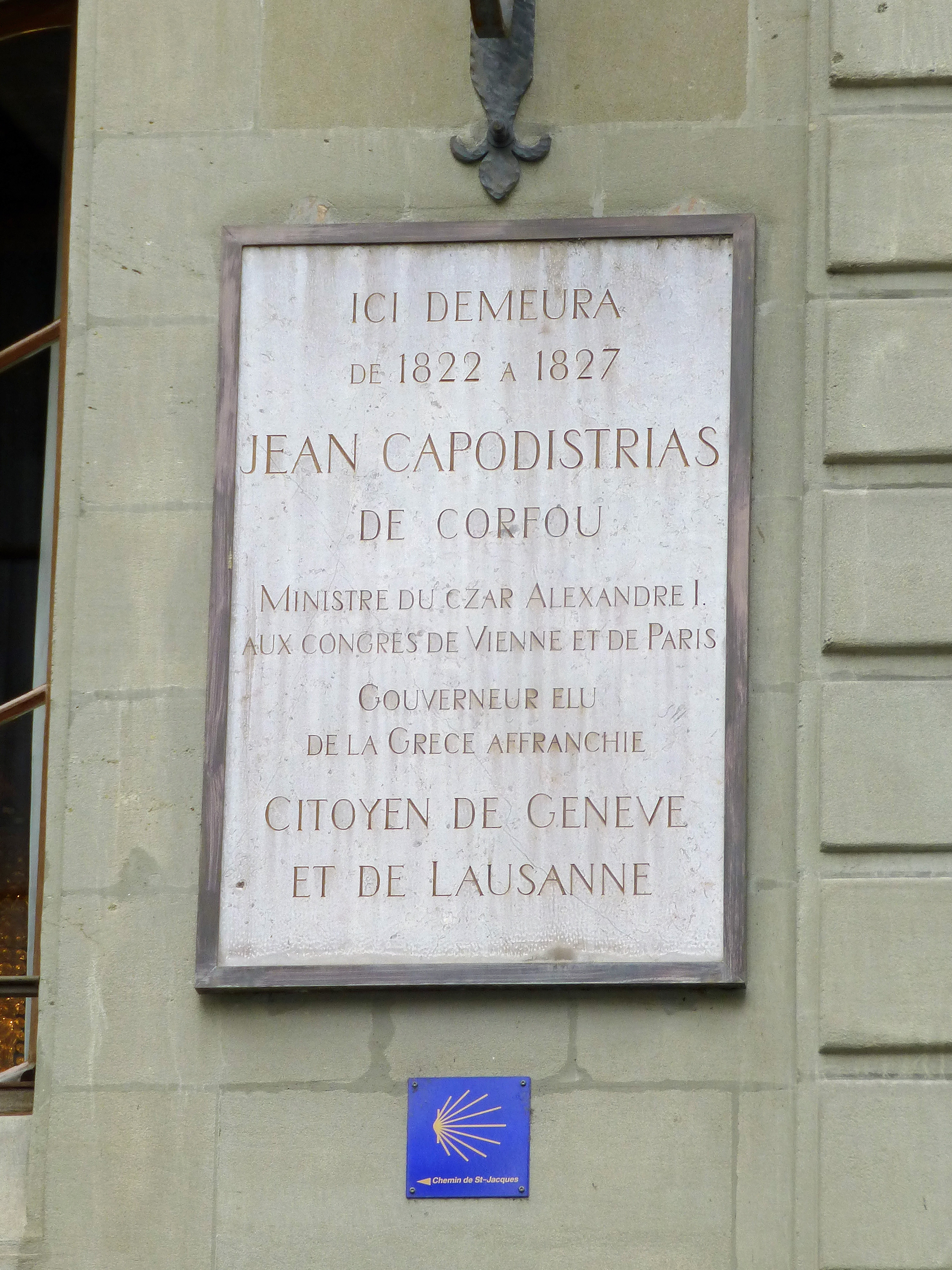
Commemorative plaque at the house of Kapodistrias in Geneva, Switzerland

On 21 September 2009, the city of Lausanne in Switzerland inaugurated a bronze statue of Kapodistrias in Ouchy. The ceremony was attended by the Foreign Ministers of the Russian Federation, Sergei Lavrov and of Switzerland, Micheline Calmy-Rey. In addition, the allée Ioannis-Capodistrias in Ouchy at Lausanne was named after him.

The cantons of Geneva and Vaud in Switzerland awarded Kapodístrias honorary citizenship.

In the City of Geneva, the quai Capo d'Istria is named after Kapodistrias. The city also features a bust of Kapodistrias in Parc des Bastions, positioned alongside the monument to Jean-Gabriel Eynard. Additionally, a commemorative plaque marks his former residence in the city.

=== Russia ===
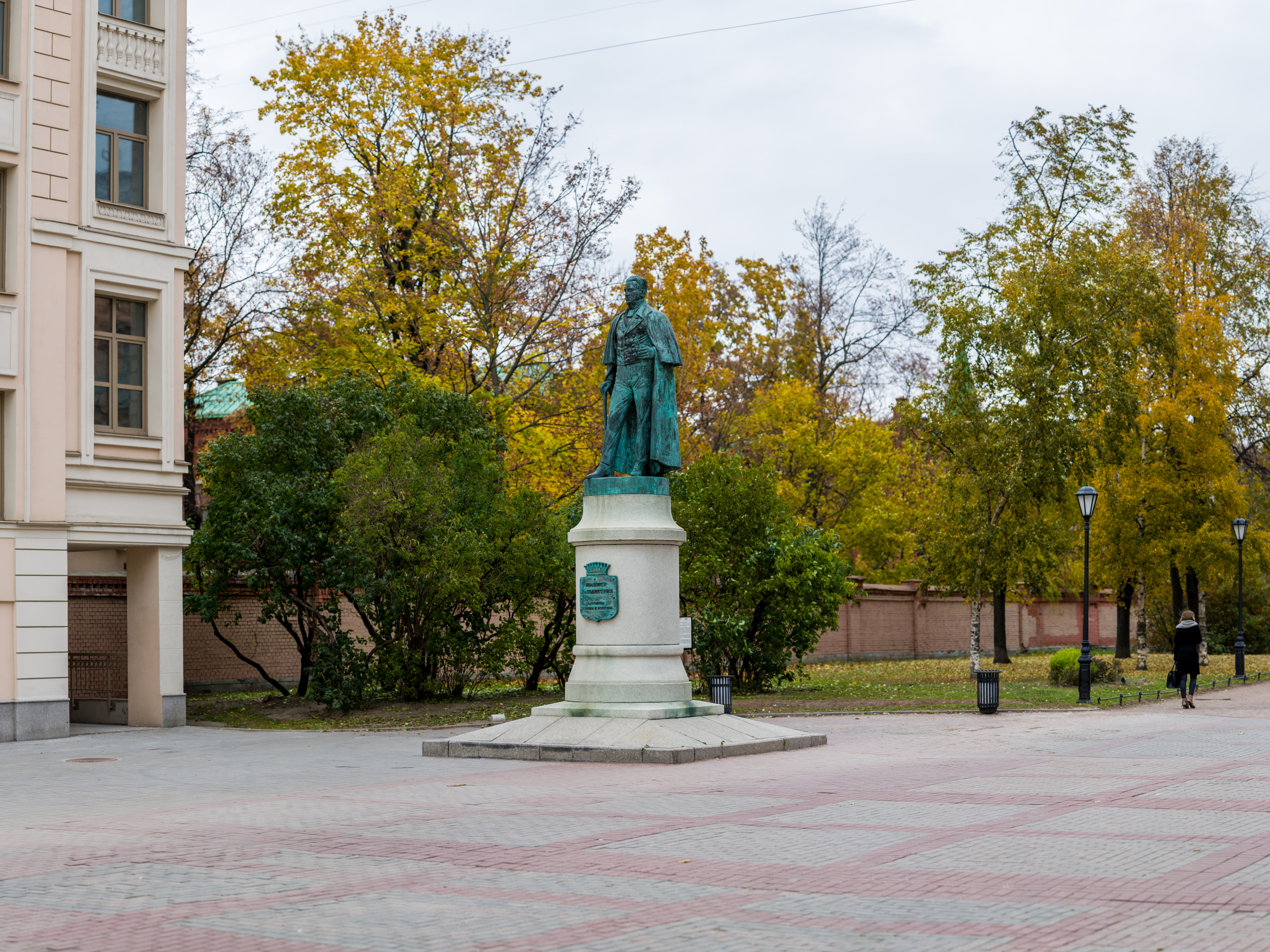
Statue in Saint Petersburg

On 19 June 2015, Prime Minister of Greece Alexis Tsipras, in the first of that day's activities, addressed Russians of Greek descent at a statue of Ioannis Kapodistrias in St. Petersburg.

=== International network ===
On 24 February 2007, the cities of Aegina, Nafplion, Corfu, Koper-Capodistria, and Famagusta (one of the notable families of Famagusta was the Gonemis family, from whom Ioannis Capodistrias mother, Adamantine Gonemis, was descended) created the Ioannis Kapodistrias Network, a network of municipalities which are associated with the late governor. The network aims to promote the life and vision of Ioannis Kapodistrias across borders. The presidency of the network is currently held by the Greek municipality of Nafplion.

== Notes ==
Government offices
Preceded by Nikolay Rumyantsev	Foreign Minister of Russia; 1816–1822 with Karl Nesselrode	Succeeded by Karl Nesselrode
Political offices
Preceded by Vice-gubernatorial Committee of 1827	Governor of Greece; 1827–1831	Succeeded by Augustinos Kapodistrias
