= Tousias Botsaris =

Souliot commander and fighter

- Τούσιας Μπότσαρης
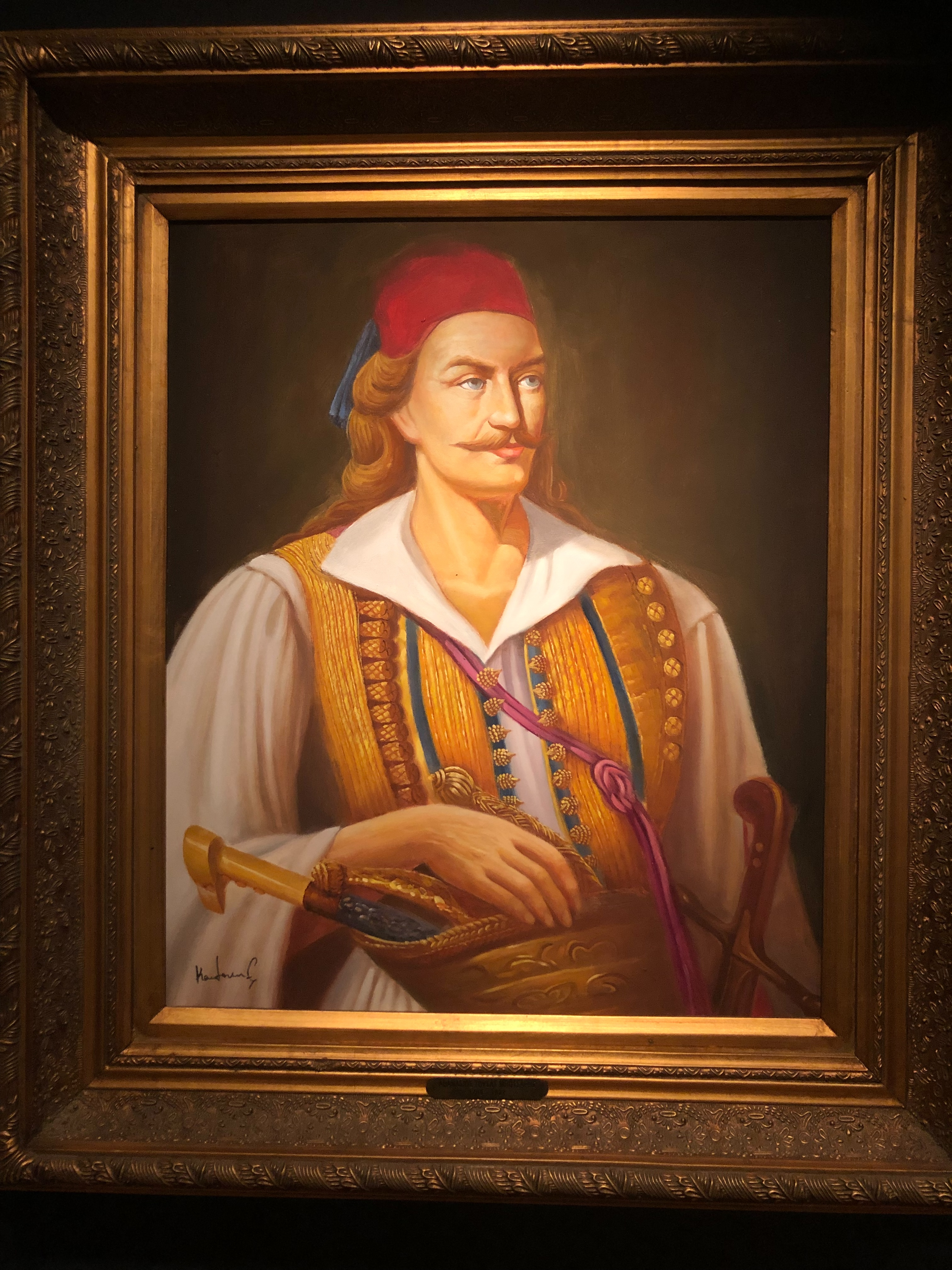
- A portrait of Tousias Botsaris
- Born: Athanasios Tousias Botsaris; Αθανάσιος Τούσιας Μπότσαρης c. 1792; Souli, Pashalik of Yanina, Ottoman Empire (now Greece)
- Died: 22 April 1827 (aged 34-35); Phaleron, Sanjak of Eğriboz, Ottoman Empire (now Greece)
- Relatives: Kitsos Botsaris (uncle); Notis Botsaris (uncle); Markos Botsaris (cousin); Kostas Botsaris (cousin); Dimitrios Botsaris (nephew); Katerina Botsari (niece)
- Military career
- Allegiance: (Greece) First Hellenic Republic
- Branch: Hellenic Army
- Conflicts: Greek War of Independence; Battle of Karpenisi; Second Siege of Missolonghi; Battle of Phaleron †

Tousias Botsaris (1792–1827), was a Souliot commander and fighter of the Greek War of Independence. He was the cousin of Markos Botsaris and the grandson of Giorgis Botsaris. He took part in many battles and enjoyed the admiration of Philhellenes.

== Life ==
Tousias was born in Souli in 1792, two months after the death of his father whom he was named after. He distinguished himself in all cases of involvement of the Souliotes. Later in his life, he became deputy leader of the corps of Souliots commanded by his cousin Markos Botsaris. He fought with him both in the defense of Souli and in Western Greece as well as at the Battle of Karpenisi. He was the leader of the Legislative Corps in Nafplio.

He also took part in the siege of Messolonghi where he excelled in the battles fought there. Later he followed Georgios Karaiskakis to Nafplio and from there to his campaign in Attica where he finally fell fighting in Phaleron on April 22, 1827.

He was admired by general Richard Church and admiral Lord Thomas Cochrane.

It was ordered that his body be buried with honours next to Karaiskakis in Salamis.
