= Vasileios Goudas =

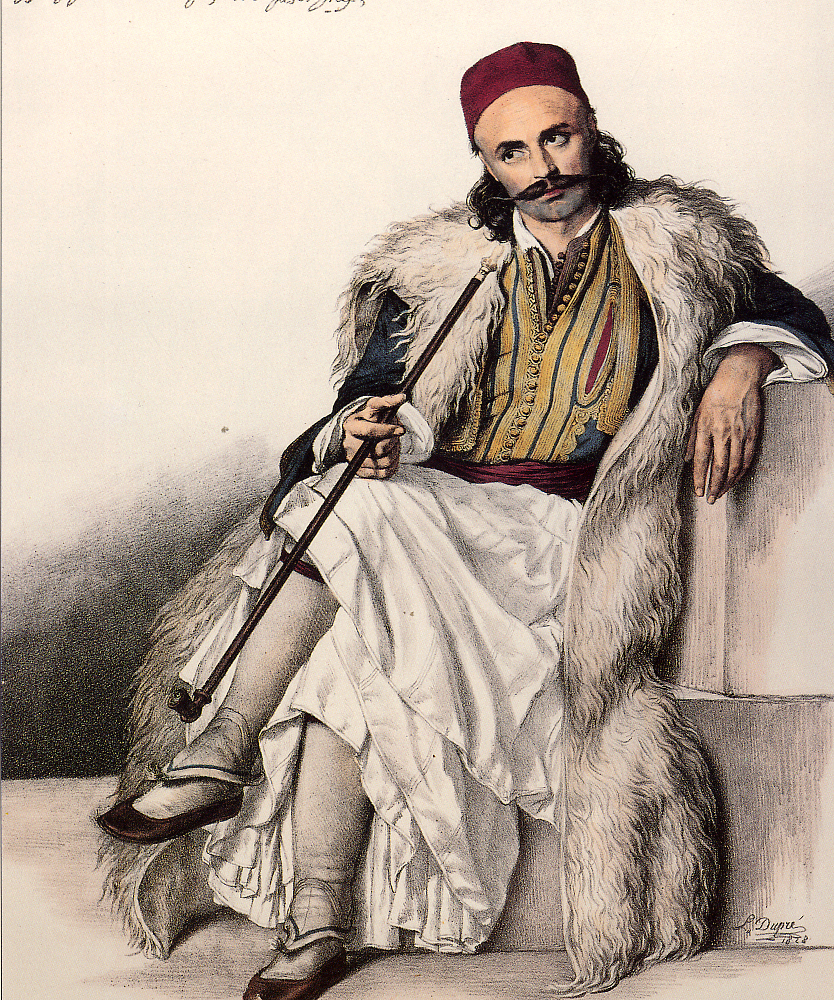
- Vasileios Goudas by Louis Dupré
- Native name: Βασίλειος Γούδας
- Born: c. 1779 Ioannina or Grammeno, Ioannina Eyalet, Ottoman Empire (now Greece)
- Died: 1845 (aged 65–66) Athens, Kingdom of Greece
- Allegiance: First Hellenic Republic; Kingdom of Greece
- Branch: Hellenic Army
- Rank: Lieutenant
- Battles / wars: Greek War of Independence; First Siege of Missolonghi; Battle of Peta; Battle of Karpenisi

Vasileios Goudas (Greek: Βασίλειος Γούδας; c. 1779 – 1845) was a fighter of the Greek War of Independence and an officer of the Greek Army from Epirus.

== Biography ==
Goudas was born in Ioannina or Grammeno around 1779. He took part in the Greek War of Independence, being closely associated with the Souliot clan of Botsaris. At first he served as a secretary and adjutant of Markos Botsaris and he fought in several battles under Botsaris' command. In July 1821, he contributed to the uprising of the area of Grammeno. In 1823 he oversaw on behalf of the revolutionary government the liquidation of the assets following the requisition of an Italian ship, which resulted in proceeds of 8000 kuruş. After Markos Botsaris' death, Goudas served as secretary of his brother Kostas Botsaris.

In September 1824, after the report of Kostas Botsaris that described very positively Goudas’ contribution to the revolution so far, the latter was promoted to chiliarch. In early January 1826, he went to the headquarters of the Legislative Corps in Nafplio as envoy of the guard of the monastery of Mega Spilaion which was under the leadership of Tousias Botsaris.

From late 1827 until mid-1828, because of a serious health problem, Goudas, starting from the Ionian Islands, travelled to various European cities (Ancona, Pisa, Marseille, Geneva, Paris, etc.) meeting various important people of the time like Ioannis Kapodistrias, Metropolitan Ignatius of Hungary-Wallachia, the French General Lafayette and Jean-Gabriel Eynard.

Vasileios Goudas died in Athens in 1845 having the military rank of Lieutenant. His brother, Stavros Goudas, was a fighter of the Revolution as well, but later he became a monk. His nephew was the doctor, writer and politician Anastasios Goudas.

== Bibliography ==
- Nikolaos Spiliadis, Απομνημονεύματα, Εκ του Τυπογραφείου Χ. Ν. Φιλαδελφέως, Αθήνησιν, 1851.
- Σύγχρονος Εγκυκλοπαίδεια Ελευθερουδάκη, vol.7.
- Περιοδικό Ζωσιμάδες, issue 43.

== Sources ==
- Αρχεία της Ελληνικής Παλιγγενεσίας, Έκδοσις της Βιβλιοθήκης της Βουλής των Ελλήνων, vol. 7, 10, 13.
- Γενική Εφημερίς της Ελλάδος, 30 June 1828.
