= Notis Botsaris =

Souliote commander and fighter

Notis Botsaris Νότης Μπότσαρης Noti Boçari
- Noti Boçari (Albanian)
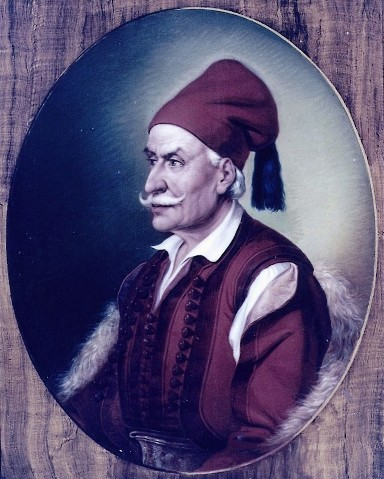
- A portrait of Notis Botsaris
- Born: c. 1756; Souli, Eyalet of Yanina, Ottoman Empire (now Greece)
- Died: 26 March 1841 (aged 84-85); Nafpaktos, Kingdom of Greece
- Relatives: Kitsos Botsaris (brother); Markos Botsaris (nephew); Kostas Botsaris (nephew); Tousias Botsaris (nephew); Dimitrios Botsaris (great-nephew); Katerina Botsari (great-niece)
- Military career
- Allegiance: (Greece) First Hellenic Republic
- Branch: Hellenic Army
- Rank: Lieutenant General
- Conflicts: Greek War of Independence; Third Siege of Missolonghi

Notis Botsaris (Greek: Νότης Μπότσαρης, 1756 – March 26, 1841) was a Souliote fighter and general in the Greek Revolution of 1821. He was the son of the late Giorgis Botsaris and was the leader of the Souliote fara of the Botsari.

== Life ==
Notis Botsaris was born in Souli in 1756. He was a member of the Botsaris (Albanian: Boçari; Greek: Botsaraioi, Μποτσαραίοι) clan of the Souliotes. His clan emerged as the strongest clan in Souli and the one which Ali Pasha, the ruler of the Pashalik of Yanina where Souli was located, recognized as its lawful representative. He was a son of George Botsaris and as such brother of Kitsos Botsaris and uncle of the latter's son, Markos.

After the death of his brother Kitsos, he took over the leadership of the Botsari clan. During skirmishes with Ottomans in Agrafa he was wounded and captured, but after six months he managed to escape from the fortress of Këlcyrë where he was imprisoned.

After the mediation of Ibrahim Pasha of Berati, a relative of Ali Pasha, he accepted to enter the service of Ali, on the condition that he stays in Kakolakkos Pogoniou. Ali Pasha invited him to Ioannina and allegedly sent him on a mission to Larissa, with the intention of setting an ambush for him in order to kill him on the way. However, Veli, son of Ali Pasha, warned him, and so Botsaris fled to Corfu. There he gathered the local Souliotes and incited them to head to Parga and from there to Preveza, to fight with the Ottoman troops against Ali Pasha. When after the fall of Preveza (1820) it was decided to besiege Ioannina, Botsaris and the Souliotes also took part, as revenge for Ali Pasha. The Sultan's commander-in-chief, however, did not keep the promise he had made to Botsaris, and instead of giving land to the Souliotes, he capitulated with Ali Pasha, turning his arms towards the Sultan's army and marching towards Souli.

He took part in the 3rd Assembly of Western Greece in the East. In Preveza, the house of Notis Botsaris, which he had acquired in 1806, was preserved until 1970. Notis Botsaris was honored by Othon with the rank of Lieutenant General.

He died in Nafpaktos in 1841.

== Sources ==
- Ψιμούλη, Βάσω Δ. (2006). Σούλι και Σουλιώτες. Ιστορία και Πολιτική (4th ed.). Athens: Βιβλιοπωλείον της Εστίας.
  - Psimuli, Vaso Dh. (2016). Suli dhe suljotët [Souli and the Souliots]. Toena. ISBN 9789928205728.
