= Song of Marko Boçari =

The Song of Marko Boçari from Suli (Albanian: Kënga e Marko Boçarit nga Suli) is an Albanian polyphonic song of the early 19th century, narrating the death of Markos Botsaris, a Souliot leader.

== History ==
Markos Botsaris was a leader of the Souliotes. After the beginning of Greek War of Independence he became one of its central figures. He died in Karpenisi, modern western Greece in 1823 during a battle between Ottoman and Souliot forces.

== Song ==
The Song of Marko Boçari from Suli is a narrative and lament of his death. It contains more than 70 octosyllabic lines and was published about fifty years after the event by Thimi Mitko, an Albanian folklorist in his book Bleta Shqipëtare (Albanian: The Albanian Bee).

== Lyrics ==
Part of the lyrics:

Albanian

Një harap me karabinë
u ngulë e shtroi synë
Goditi bajrakn' e mirë
Marko Boçari shahinë!

Erdhi Kosta vet i tretë
"More shokë, gjithë erdhët
S'prit të vinja edhe unë,
Vriti, shokë, Shqipëtarë,
biru qënet, se më vrane
Mermëni sa jam i gjallë
më muarë plumbi ndë ballë

English

A moor with a carbine
kneeled and took aim,
He struck the goodly banner,
Marko Boçari the falcon!

Kosta himself came with two others.
"Hey, comrades, have you all come?
Didn't you wait for me as well?
Kill them, oh Albanian comrades
Shoot the dogs, cause they have slain me.
Take me while I am alive,
The shot has struck my forehead!

== See also ==
- Music of Albania
