= Kostas Botsaris =

Greek general and senator (c. 1792 – 1853)

Kostas Botsaris Κώστας Μπότσαρης Kosta Boçari
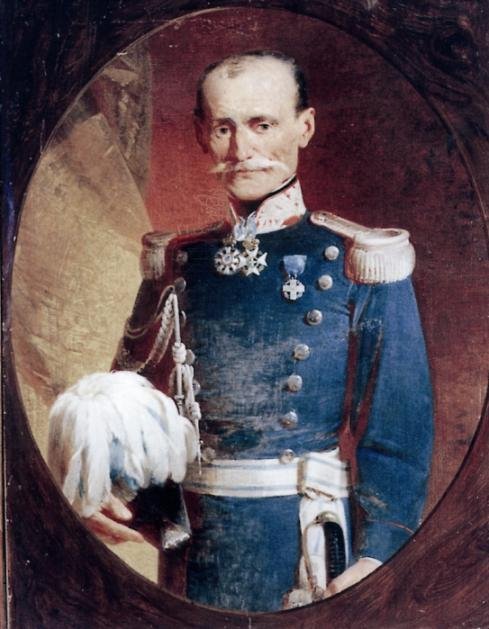
- A portrait of Kostas Botsaris in uniform

Senator
- In office 1844–1847
- Monarch: Otto
- Prime Minister: Ioannis Kolettis

Personal details
- Born: Konstantinos Botsaris; Κωνσταντίνος Μπότσαρης; Kosta Boçari c. 1792 Souli, Pashalik of Yanina, Ottoman Empire (now Greece)
- Died: 13 November 1853 (aged 60–61) Athens, Kingdom of Greece
- Spouse: Eleni Iskou
- Relations: Kitsos Botsaris (father); Notis Botsaris (uncle); Markos Botsaris (brother); Tousias Botsaris (cousin); Dimitrios Botsaris (nephew); Katerina Botsari (niece)
- Awards: Commander of the Order of the Redeemer
- Nickname(s): Kitsos; Κίτσος

Military service
- Allegiance: First French Empire; First Hellenic Republic; Kingdom of Greece
- Branch/service: Imperial French Army; Hellenic Army
- Years of service: 1814–1850
- Rank: General (Hellenic Army)
- Unit: Albanian Regiment
- Battles/wars: Greek War of Independence; Battle of Karpenisi; Battle of Arachova; Battle of Phaleron

Kostas (Kitsos) Botsaris (Greek: Κώστας (Κίτσος) Μπότσαρης; c. 1792 – 1853), also known as Constantine Botzaris, was a Greek general and senator. He was also a captain and a hero of the War of Greek Independence. He fought at the Battle of Karpenisi and completed the victory of his brother, the renowned Markos Botsaris.

== Early life ==
Kosta Botsaris was born in 1792 near Paramythia.

== Greek War of Independence ==
In 1803 Kostas Botsaris and the remnants of the Souliotes crossed over to the Ionian Islands, where they ultimately took service in the French-raised Albanian Regiment. In 1814, he joined the Greek patriotic society known as the Filiki Eteria. In 1820, he fought to the end on Ali Pasha's side against the Ottoman army.

On the night of 21 August 1823 Kostas, under the leadership of his brother Markos participated in the celebrated attack on Karpenisi by 350 Souliotes, against around 1000 Ottoman troops who formed the vanguard of the army with which Mustai Pasha was advancing to reinforce the besiegers. The Souliotes were victorious, however his brother was fatally wounded in the attack.

== Later life ==
After the death of his brother Markos Botsaris, Kostas lived on to become a respected Greek general and parliamentarian in the Greek Kingdom. Fifteen years after the death of his brother, the American traveller and author Mr. John Lloyd Stephens visited Kostas Botsaris, then a colonel in the service of King Otto of Greece in Missolonghi, and described him as:

A man of about fifty years of age, of middle height and spare build, who, immediately after the formal introduction, expressed his gratitude as a Greek for the services rendered his country by America; and added, with sparkling eye and flushed cheek, that when the Greek revolutionary flag sailed into the port of Napoli di Romania, among hundreds of vessels of all nations, an American captain was the first to recognize and salute it.

— John Lloyd Stephens, 1838

Botsaris continued to serve in the Greek kingdom until his death in Athens on 13 November 1853.

== See also ==
- Markos Botsaris
- Battle of Karpenisi
- Souliotes
- Greek War of Independence

== Bibliography ==
- Stathis, Panagiotis (2007). "From Klephts and Armatoloi to Revolutionaries". In Anastasopoulos, Antonis; Kolovos, Elias (eds.). Ottoman rule and the Balkans, 1760-1850: Conflict, Transformation, Adaption (PDF). University of Crete.
- Incidents of Travel in Greece, Turkey, Russia and Poland (1838)
