= Siege of Missolonghi =

The siege of Missolonghi may refer to one of three different sieges of the town of Missolonghi during the Greek War of Independence:

- The First Siege of Missolonghi (1822)
- The Second Siege of Missolonghi (1823)
- The Third Siege of Missolonghi (1825–26), leading to the fall of the town. This is the most famous of the three, and typically an unqualified reference to the "Siege of Missolonghi" will be about it
