= Markos Botsaris =

General and hero of the Greek War of Independence and more

General Markos Botsaris Μάρκος Μπότσαρης Marko Boçari
- Marko Boçari (Albanian)
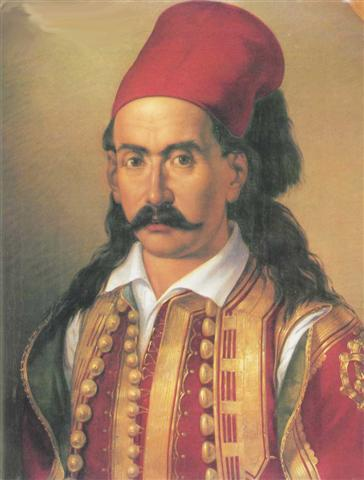
- A portrait of Markos Botsaris.
- Born: 1790; Souli, Pashalik of Yanina, Ottoman Empire (now Greece)
- Died: 21 August 1823 (aged 32–33); Karpenisi, Sanjak of Inebahti, Ottoman Empire (now Greece)
- Burial place: Garden of Heroes, Missolonghi, Greece
- Spouses: Eleni Karakitsou (m. 1806; div. 1810); Chrysoula Kalogerou
- Children: Dimitrios Botsaris (son); Katerina Botsari (daughter)
- Relatives: Kitsos Botsaris (father); Notis Botsaris (uncle); Kostas Botsaris (brother); Tousias Botsaris (cousin)
- Military career
- Allegiance: First French Empire (Greece) First Hellenic Republic
- Branch: Imperial French Army; Hellenic Army
- Service years: 1804–1823
- Rank: General of the Greek Army
- Units: Albanian Regiment (French Army); Souliot Forces; Revolutionary Army of Western Central Greece
- Commands: Chieftain of the Souliot Forces; Commanding General of Western Central Greece
- Conflicts: Siege and Fall of Souli (1820); Ali Pasha's Rebellion; Siege of Ioannina; Greek War of Independence; Battle of Peta; First Siege of Missolonghi; Battle of Karpenisi †
- Other work: Author of a Greek–Albanian lexicon

Markos Botsaris (Greek: Μάρκος Μπότσαρης; 1790 – 21 August 1823) was a Souliot chieftain, general of the Greek revolutionary army and hero of the Greek War of Independence. He played a key role in relieving the First Siege of Missolonghi in 1822–1823 and was awarded the title of General of Western Greece by the revolutionary Greek government. He was killed during the Battle of Karpenisi and was buried in Missolonghi with full honors. Botsaris is among the most revered national heroes in Greece.

== Family and early life (1790–1820) ==
Markos was born in 1790 in Souli, the fifth child of Kitsos Botsaris from his first marriage with Chrysoula, one of the daughters of Papazotos Yotis, the priest of Variades, a village of Lakka (Tsarkovista). The Souliotes spoke Albanian originally, but during the eighteenth century they learnt to also use Greek via communication with their mostly Greek-speaking surroundings. Marko's native language was a dialect of Albanian and not Greek, as such, he was known by his Albanian name, Marko Boçari (IPA: [ˈmaɾko boˈtʃaɾi]), rather than by Markos Botsaris, though he certainly also spoke Greek. Markos was born into the most powerful Souliot fara, the Botsaris clan (Albanian: fara Boçari, Greek: γένος Μπότσαρη), which up until the end of the Greek Revolution was known in Greek as "Botsarates" (Greek: Μποτσαράτες, Albanian: Boçarenjtë). According to an unclear narrative recorded by Christoforos Perraivos, which is considered implausible by contemporary historiography, the Botsaris clan came from the village of Dragani (today Ambelia), near Paramythia. Botsaris clan were one of the oldest clans from Souli. Their name may be related to the Albanian word buzë as hinted by written variants of the name in the 19th century. The patron saint of the clan was Donatus of Euroea. The Botsaris had built a church dedicated to Saint Donatus in the areas of Souli they directly controlled.

They were the biggest of the Souliot clans which negotiated and eventually collaborated with Ali Pasha. Perraivos (1815) is one of the contemporary historians who recorded the collaboration with Ali Pasha since the spring of 1800. Perraivos attributes this shift to the "madness of greed" of George Botsaris (grandfather of Markos Botsaris) whom he calls a "paid traitor". Other historians of the 19th century follow the same assessment. In modern historiography, the explanation of his political stance through "greed" is considered an oversimplification. Like all other Souliot clans, the Botsaris first and foremost worked for the interests of their own clan, and sought to improve the wealth and political position of their clan, hence the stance of George Botsaris and all Souliot leaders is interpreted in this framework. For the Botsaris clan, since 1799 when Ali Pasha took control of the villages of Lakka Souli which were previously under the sphere of influence of the Botsaris clan, integration in the Ottoman system was the only viable political option. In 1800, George Botsaris received a large sum and the position of the armatolos of Tzoumerka, and the Botsaris clan left Souli and settled in Vourgareli of Arta. This was the first time that a Souliot clan became part of the Ottoman political system. The departure of the Botsaris clan weakened Souli as they were a significant part of its force and Souli was led to surrender to Ali in 1803, after a three-year siege. Thirteen year-old Markos used his limited literacy to record his anguish for the besieged Christians of Souli in a remembrance note of 3 November on the book cover of a Menaion of a chapel of Palaiokatouna (Voulgareli).

After the surrender of Souli, Souliot clans chose divergent paths but many were ultimately led to move to the Ionian Islands and in south Greece. Kitsos Botsaris who had succeeded his father as armatolos of Tzoumerka became a target. Botsaris gathered his clan and 1,200 Souliots who retreated to Agrafa. In January 1804, they were attacked by Ali Pasha's army under Beqir Bey with support from the local armatoloi Zikos Michos, Tzimas Alexis and Poulis. As the Botsaris clan was given the important armatolik of Tzoumerka, other armatoloi had targeted them. The Souliots were besieged for 3 months on the grounds of the monastery of the Assumption of Mary. In the final battle, on 7 April, most Souliotes were killed and of those who survived many were taken hostage. About 80 escaped from this battle. Ali Pasha at the same time published a firman which targeted the Botsaris clan which was hunted down. Kitsos Botsaris and his family with a few others managed to escape to Parga and later settled in the Ionian Islands. He returned to the Pashalik of Yanina in 1813 when Ali Pasha gave him again the armatolik of Tzoumerka but as soon as he returned he was murdered by a Gogos Bakolas.

Markos Botsaris lived since the age of fourteen in the Ionian Islands, in particular in Lefkada where the family resettled. In Lefkada he lived in the same household (corporate household/extended patrilineage) like his father Kitsos who headed the household even after Markos was married, his father's third wife, his own wife (Eleni Karakitsou), his brothers and sisters, his deceased uncle's widow (Zoitsa Bakopani) and their housemaid. Kitsos was married three times and had in total 18 children; 12 of them survived into adulthood. Markos was married for the first time in 1806 to the daughter of A. Karakitsos, Eleni. They were divorced a few years later ca. 1810. Botsaris accused his wife of cheating in the petition to get a divorce, she defended herself by claiming that her father-in-law (Kitsos) would have killed her as is the custom of the Albanians (nomos eis tous Alvanitas) if such an accusation was true. The real reason of the divorce possibly had to do with her not being able to bear children, which was seen as extremely important in Souliot society. Markos eventually was remarried, this time to Chrysoula Kalogerou, the daughter of Christos Kalogeros, commander of the third order of the Albanian Regiment, where Markos's father served as a major.

Markos Botsaris had joined with other Souliots the Albanian Regiment of the French army at an early age. He served the regiment until 1813 and also became one of the regiment's officers. In 1815 he returned to Epirus, and settled with his family at Kakolakkos Pogoniou, which was granted to him by Ali Pasha.

== Epirus (1820–1821) ==
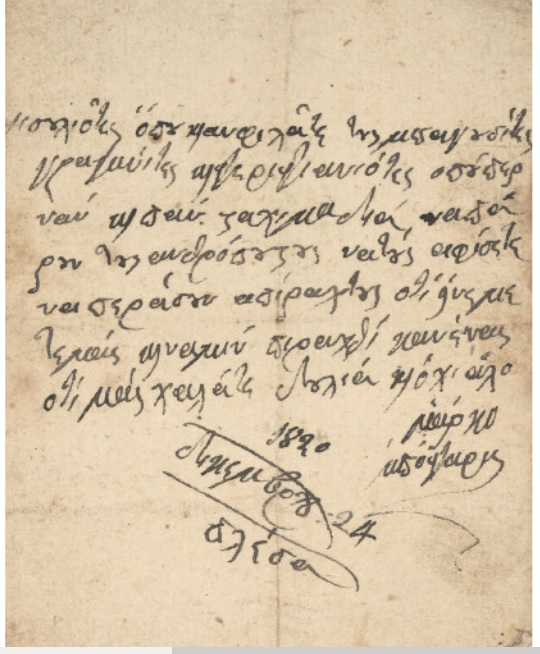
Letter written personally by M. Botsaris, 1820, that contains orders to certain Souliote guardians to allow the free passage of shepherds.

In 1820, with other Souliotes and his uncle Notis Botsaris, he came back to Epirus and fought against Ali Pasha and the Ottoman army at the Siege of Ioannina, but soon the Souliotes changed side and fought the Ottoman army together with the troops of Ali Pasha, in exchange for a promise of regaining their former region, Souli.

Botsaris, with about 300–350 men appeared on Mount Satovetza, opposite the sultan's camp, and attacked in December 1820. Then, he captured the fortress of Variades and fortified himself in it (7 December 1820). From there, at the head of 200 horsemen, he attacked a sultan's convoy at Kompsades (22 December 1820). Immediately afterwards he occupied the position of "Pente Pigadia", a junction between Arta and Ioannina, where he crushed a force of 5,000 Albanians sent against him. In January 1821, an anti-Ottoman coalition was formed between the Souliot chieftains and Ali Pasha's lieutenants, aiming to break the siege of Ioannina. Negotiations began with the Ottomans and continued until March 1821, when Christoforos Perraivos arrived at Epirus and informed the Souliotes about the existence of Filiki Eteria and the upcoming war of independence.

== Greek War of Independence ==
Flag raised by Markos Botsaris, in Souli, October 1820, depicting Saint George and with the words: Freedom-Religion-Fatherland in Greek.

In 1821, Botsaris took part in the revolution against the Ottoman Empire. He and other Souliot captains, including Kitsos Tzavelas, Notis Botsaris, Lampros Veikos, and Giotis Danglis only enlisted fellow Souliot kin into their bands. At the outbreak of the Greek War of Independence, he distinguished himself by his courage, tenacity and skill as a leader of the Souliots. Several battles took place at Bogortsa, Variades, Pente Pigadia and Derviziana; in the latter, Botsaris used an elaborate plan to terminate a Turkish mercenary regiment from Macedonia. Meanwhile, several fortresses, such as those of Lelova and Riniassa, fell, and in early May 1821 even the city of Preveza was put in danger of the revolutionary operations.

Despite the pressure of Ali Pasha for the immediate breaking of the siege of Ioannina, Botsaris avoided for a few months more intensive actions, aiming the extension of the siege for the interest of the revolution. During autumn of 1821, Botsaris participated in the siege of Arta, which eventually led to the termination of the cooperation between Ali and the Souliots, when the lieutenants of the former were informed of the atrocities committed by the Greek revolutionaries against Muslim populations.

Ali's lieutenants eventually deserted to the Ottomans, and during winter of 1822 he was put to death. Shortly after his demise, Hurshid Pasha's troops besieged Souli. Botsaris sought reinforcements from the Greek revolutionaries and gained the support of Alexandros Mavrokordatos. The latter's expedition that followed resulted in the battle of Peta, which proved to be disastrous for the revolutionary cause. By September 1822, Souli surrendered once more and Botsaris fled to Missolonghi.

On 12 October 1822, Botsaris was promoted to general of Western Central Greece upon the request of Alexandros Mavrokordatos. On 25 October 1822, Missolonghi was besieged for the first time by the forces of Omer Vrioni and Kütahı. Instead of attacking at once, the Ottomans preferred to negotiate for the city's surrender. Botsaris exploited this and prolonged the negotiations, thus giving time to reinforcements coming from Morea. In early November, Moreot troops disembarked in the city, the negotiations ceased, and the Ottoman leaders found themselves in a difficult situation since winter was approaching and their troops wanted to return to their homeland. After their failed attempt to take the city by assault on Christmas Eve, the siege was lifted.

=== Death ===
During summer of 1823, Mustafa Pasha of Shkodër, leading 10,000 Ottoman Albanian soldiers, campaigned against Western Greece to conquer Missolonghi per the sultan's orders. At this time, the revolutionaries were divided because many unranked chieftains and warlords (most notably the Tzavellas clan) were infuriated with Botsaris's promotion to generalship. In order to end all the disputes, the prefect of Aetolia-Acarnania, Konstantinos Metaxas, promoted all the chieftains to generals. In protest, Botsaris tore apart his own certificate of rank, also stating that he never sought higher commanding offices, but solely the revolution's success.

Finally, Botsaris moved northwards, to Karpenisi, where Mustafa Pasha and his army were located, to halt the Ottoman advance before it reached Missolonghi. The rest of the Greek revolutionary chieftains followed him soon afterwards, thus assembling a force of about 1,200 men. On 9 August 1823 (21 August N.S.), shortly after midnight, Botsaris assaulted with 350–450 men Mustafa's vanguard of approximately 5,000 soldiers. Mustafa Pasha's army was ill-prepared for an attack and suffered serious casualties by the Souliots. However, Botsaris was killed by being shot in the head and the revolutionaries were forced to withdraw. His body was carried back to Missolonghi and buried with full honors. After the Ottomans captured the city, in 1826, his grave was desecrated by Ottoman Albanian groups.

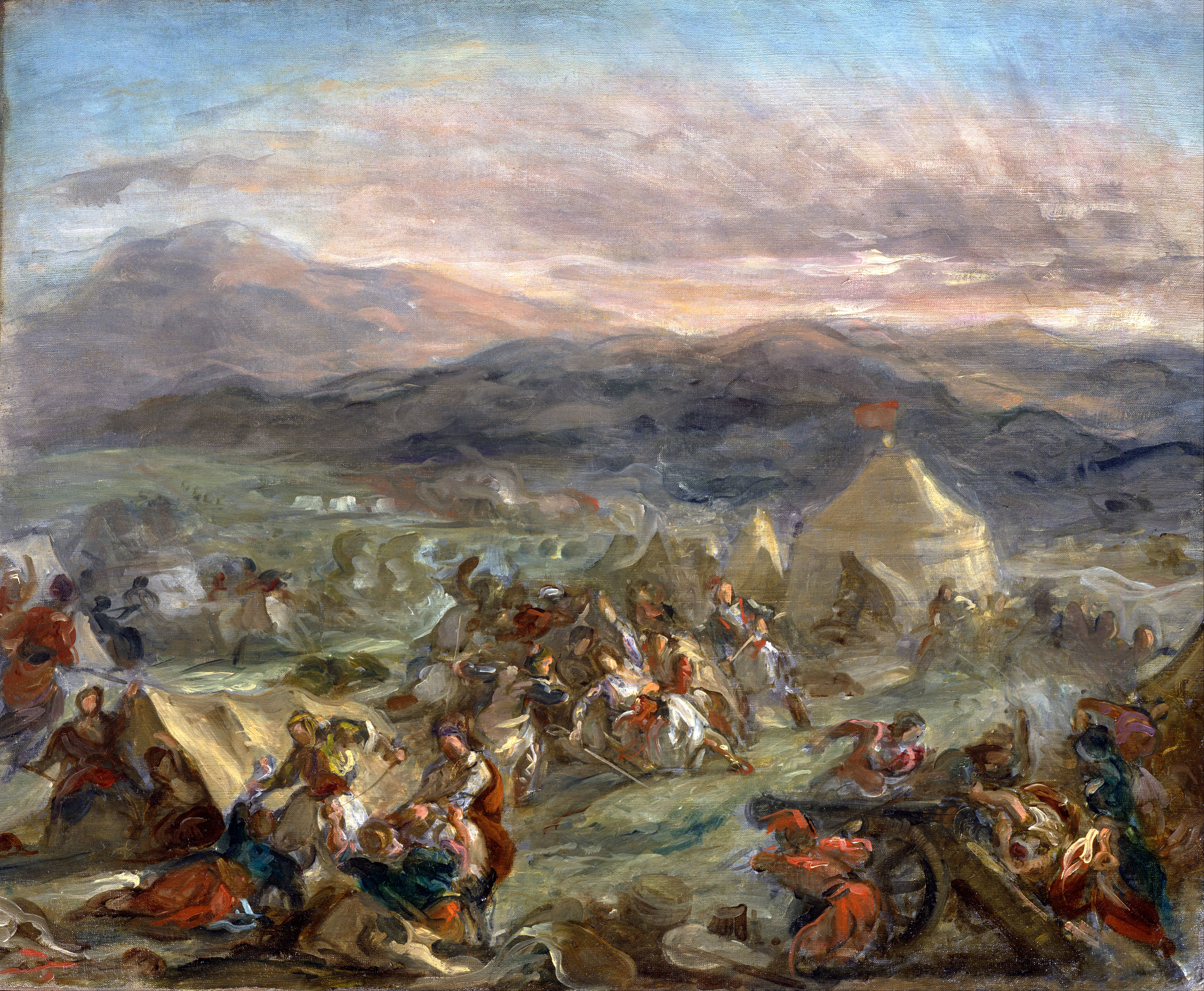
Botsaris surprises the Turkish camp and falls fatally wounded by Eugène Delacroix

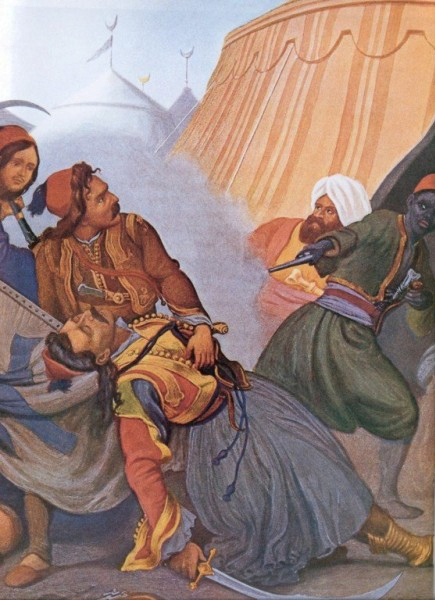
Botsaris dying in Karpenisi by Peter von Hess

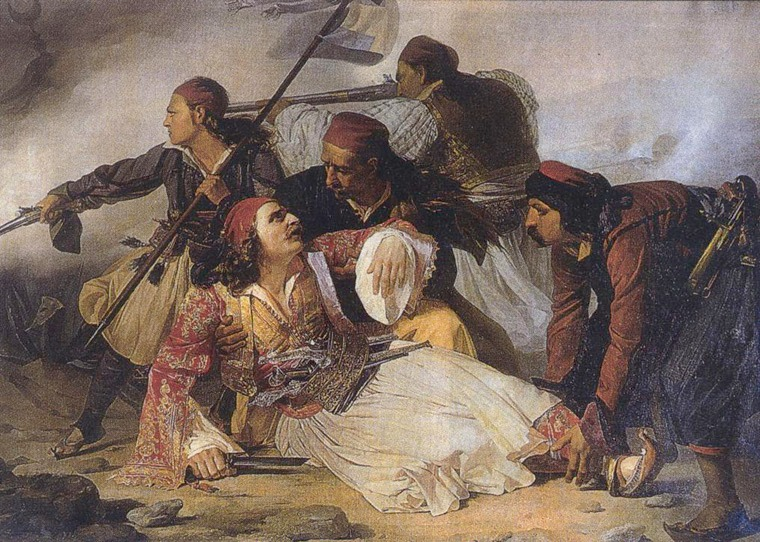
The death of Markos Botsaris. Painting by Ludovico Lipparini, Civico Museo Sartorio, Trieste, Italy.

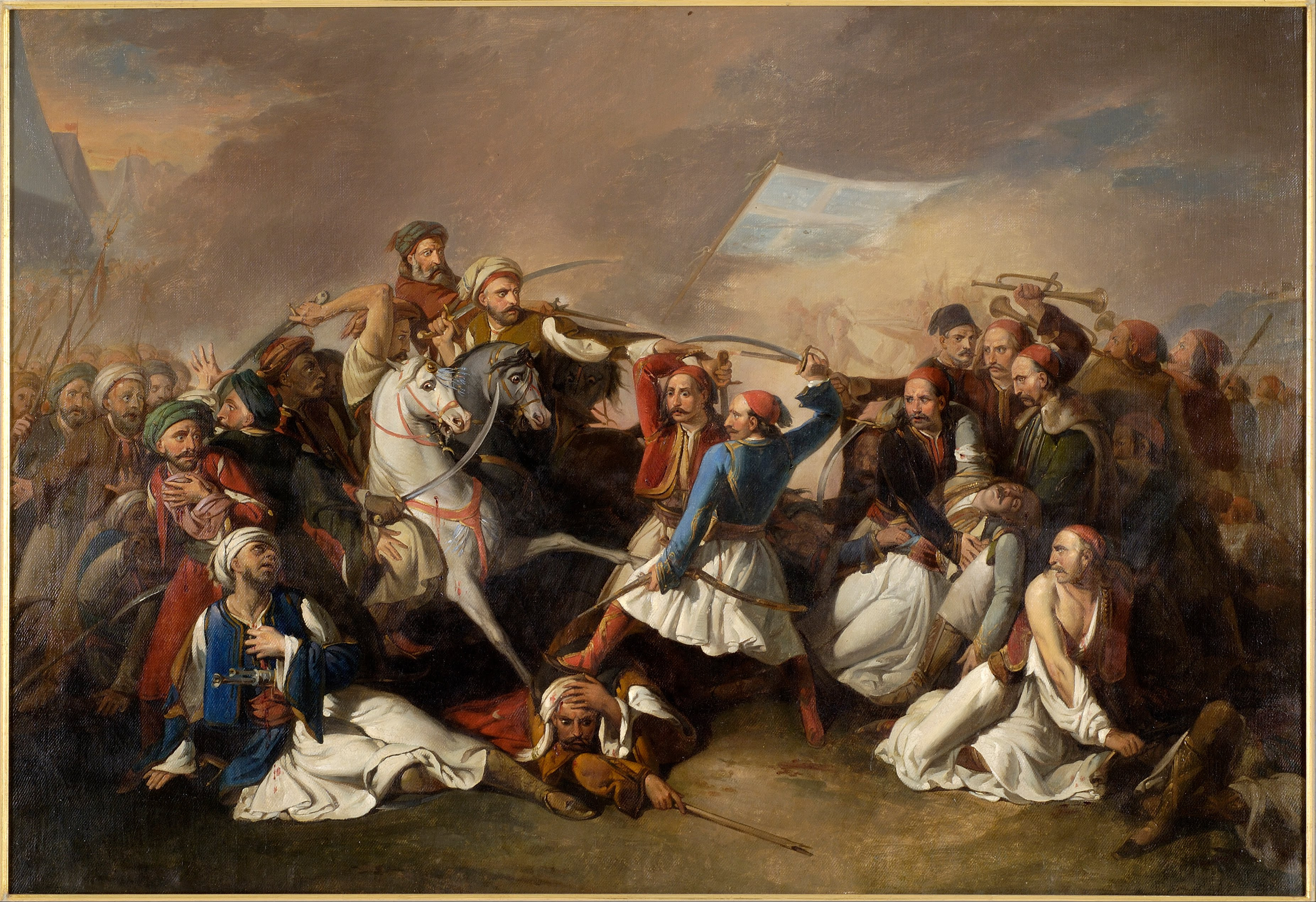
The death of Markos Botsaris. Painting by Marsigli Filippo, Benaki Museum, Athens.

== Family and companions ==
Many of his family members became key figures of the Greek political establishment. Markos' brother Kostas (Constantine) Botsaris, who also fought at Karpenisi and completed the victory, lived on to become a respected Greek general and parliamentarian in the Greek kingdom. He died in Athens on 13 November 1853. His daughter, Katerina "Rosa" Botsari, was in the service of Queen Amalia of Greece. Markos's son, Dimitrios Botsaris, born in 1813, was three times minister of war Kings Otto and George I. He died in Athens on 17 August 1870.

Evangelis Zappas, the renowned benefactor and founder of the modern Olympic Games, was the aide-de-camp and close friend of Markos Botsaris.

== Dictionary ==
Botsaris is also widely considered to be the author of a Greek–Albanian lexicon written in Corfu in 1809, at the insistence of François Pouqueville, Napoleon Bonaparte's general consul at the court of Ali Pasha in Ioannina. The dictionary is of importance for the knowledge of the extinct Souliot dialect. However, although the book is known as the Botsaris dictionary, linguist Xhevat Lloshi has argued in several works that Botsaris couldn't have possibly written that dictionary by himself, both because of his young age, and because of a note of Pouqueville that clearly says that the dictionary was drafted under the dictation of Marko's father, uncle, and future father-in-law. According to Doris Kyriazis, Botsaris transcribed the lexicon, but he was not the author of it. All of the dictionary's Greek entries are copies of the Greek translations of Italian words from an Italian-Greek dictionary of book publisher Antonio Bortoli, probably the 1775 Venice edition, which was ordered alphabetically in Italian. Botsaris's dictionary includes Greek entries corresponding to the translation of Italian entries from Bortoli's dictionary up to letter "r" in the same sequence as the translations are found in Bortoli's dictionary. Lexicologist Dinos Georgoudis concludes that Botsaris was not responsible for compiling the dictionary, but for writing down what was dictated to him and for contributing information about its Albanian part, and that the dictionary is not useful as a proof of the language spoken in Souli in the early 19th century or of Botsaris's Greek education.

The Albanian part is connected to the Tosk Albanian dialect with many archaic elements which are related to Arbëresh dialects of southern Italy. The closest existing variant of Souliotic Albanian is that of the village Anthousa (Rapëza) and also Kanallaki. This dialect is spoken only by few people in modern times. The Greek part of the dictionary is influenced both by the Greek of Epirus and the Greek of Corfu and the Ionian Islands, where the dictionary was written and Botsaris lived for many years. Jochalas notes that the presence of phenomena of Greek syntax in part of the Albanian phrases of a Greek-Albanian dictionary co-authored by Botsaris could be interpreted as evidence either of Markos and his co-contributors having Greek as their mother tongue or of the great influence of Greek on the Albanian spoken in Souli, although lack of further documents by Botsaris make the investigation of influence of Greek in Souliotic Albanian difficult. For Jochalas who edited and published the dictionary, despite the influence of Greek on Souliotic Albanian in the entries, it is evident that Botsaris and his family members who helped him lacked structural knowledge of Greek and were very inexperienced in writing. Similar lack of knowledge of Greek grammar, syntax and spelling is observed for all of the very few written documents by Souliotes.

According to Doris Kyriazis, the dictionary of Botsaris belongs to the pre-ethnic phase of the history of the Balkans. Jochalas noticing that some Greek words are translated into Albanian in more than one way, believes that Botsaris was writing the Greek words and the elders were translating into Albanian. He thinks that many of the entries seem unlikely to be useful for the Souliotes or the Albanians of that time and circumstances, and as such the dictionary was composed after Pouqueville's initiative, possibly as a source for a future French-Albanian dictionary.

== Legacy ==
Many Philhellenes visiting Greece had admired Botsaris' courage and numerous poets wrote poems about him. American poet Fitz-Greene Halleck wrote a poem entitled Marco Bozzaris, Juste Olivier also wrote an award-winning poem for him, in 1825. The national poet of Greece, Dionysios Solomos, composed a poem titled "On Markos Botsaris", in which he likens the mourning over Botsaris' body to the lamentation of Hector, as described in the last book of the Iliad. Markos is honoured in poems of Kalvos, Palamas, Balaorites as well as in plays of Zampelios, Alkeos and Soutsos. In Greek music, the Zakynthian composer Pavlos Carrer composed in 1858 the opera "Marco Bozzari" to his honour. In 1858 excerpts from the opera were performed in Athens in the presence of King Otto. The monthly periodical Apollon, based in Piraeus, published a poem in May 1889 in honour of the Princess Alexandra on the occasion of her engagement to the son of the Russian emperor, Alexander II. The 13-pages poem was written in Albanian, with the Greek translation placed in the adjacent column and with the following frontispiece: "I extol you in Albanian, in a heroic language, which was spoken by the admiral Miaoulis, Botsaris and all of Souli'".

His memory is still celebrated in popular ballads in Greece. The Greek Vlachs also sing the heroic deeds of Markos Botsaris, in Greek language. Another mid 19th c. Greek song from Epirus mentions Botsaris' widow lamenting the loss of her husband. Also, there are several folk songs dedicated to Botsaris, including a Tsamiko from Central Greece, named (Song) Of Markos Botsaris (Greek: του Μάρκου Μπότσαρη), and from the Greek minority of southern Albania (Καημένε Μάρκο Μπότσαρη). Popular dramas and school plays were written soon after his death. The Song of Marko Boçari is an Albanian folk song of the 19th century that narrates and laments his death.

Botsaris was depicted on the reverse of the Greek 50 lepta coin of 1976–2001. He often adorns posters in Greek classrooms, government offices, and military barracks, as a member of the Greek pantheon of national heroes.

Botzaris station in Paris, France is named after him.

== Gallery ==
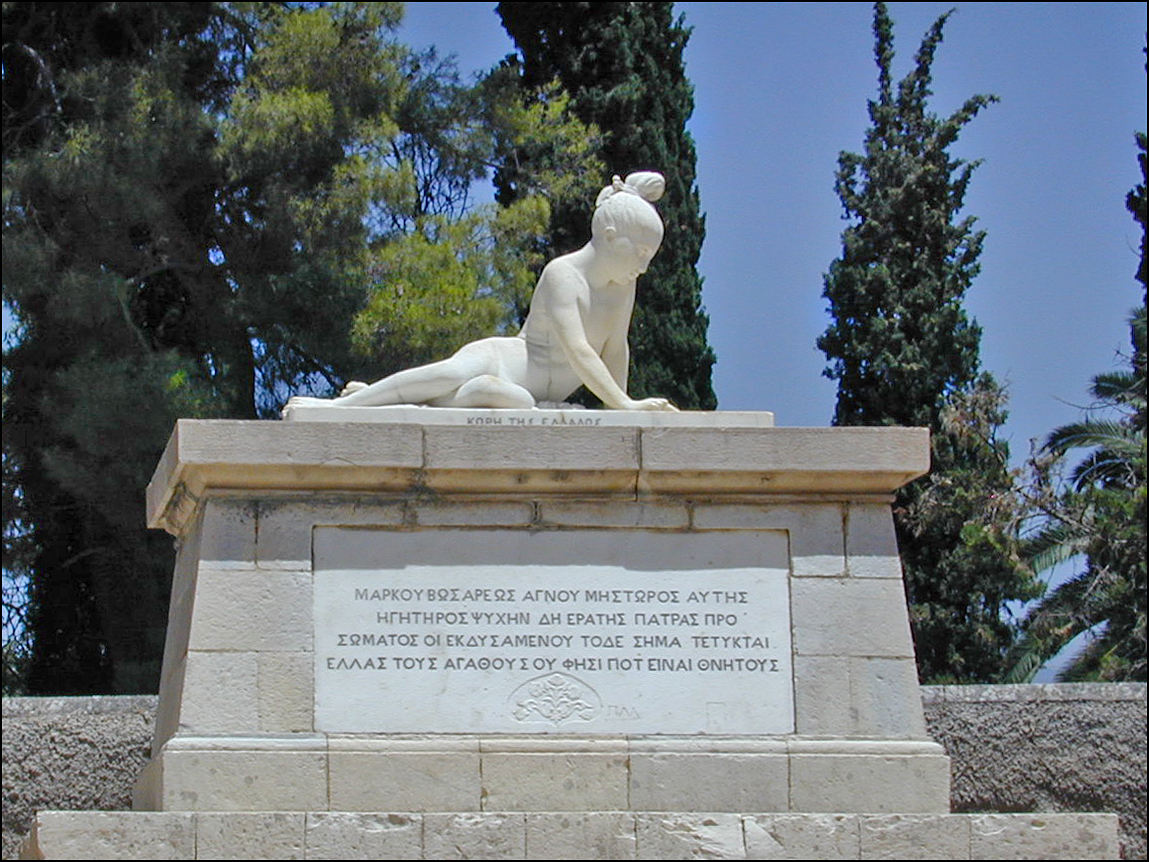
Tomb of Markos Botsaris in Missolonghi, copy by Georgios Bonanos. The original by French sculptor David d'Angers is in Athens.

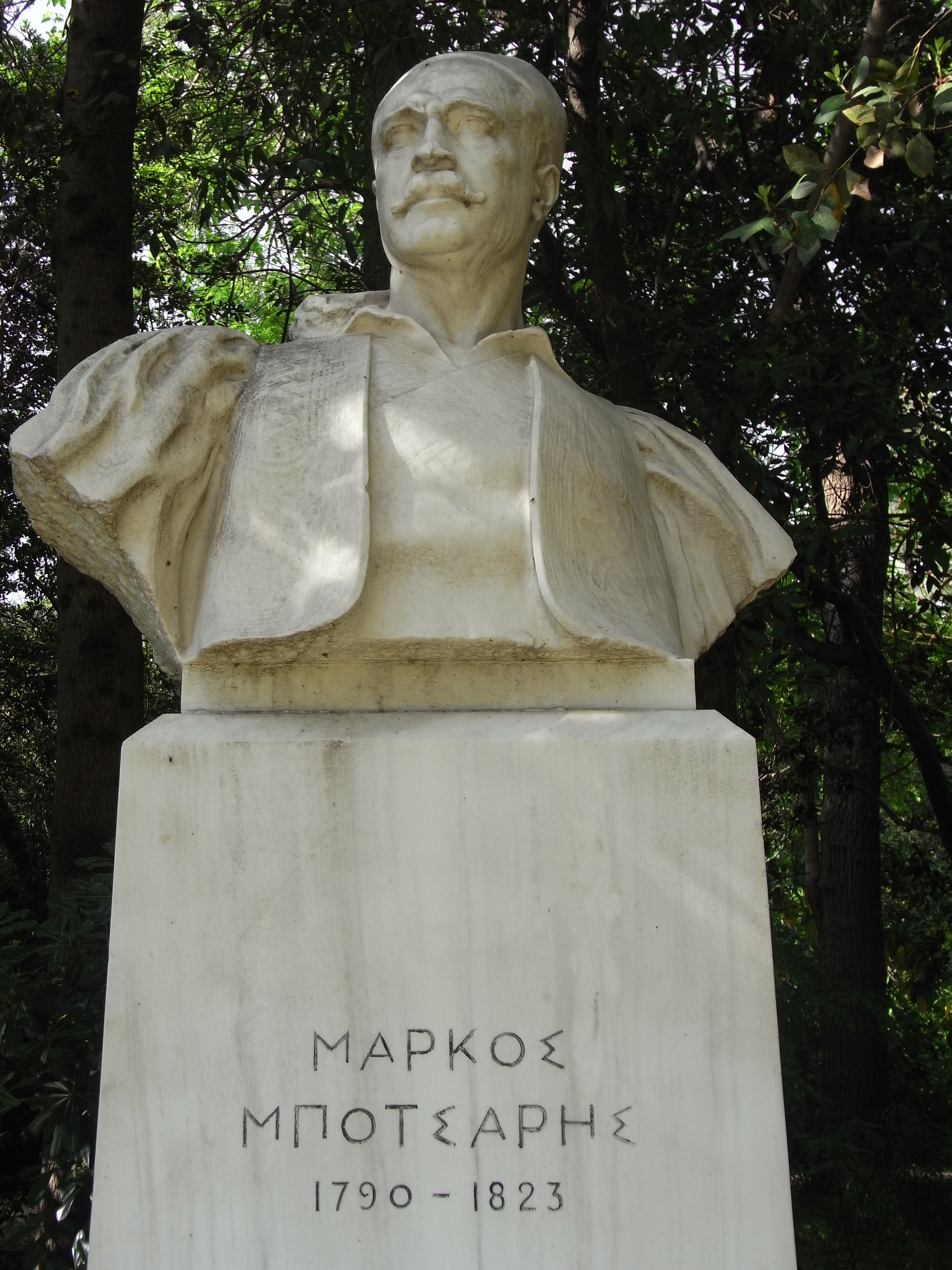
Bust in Pedion tou Areos

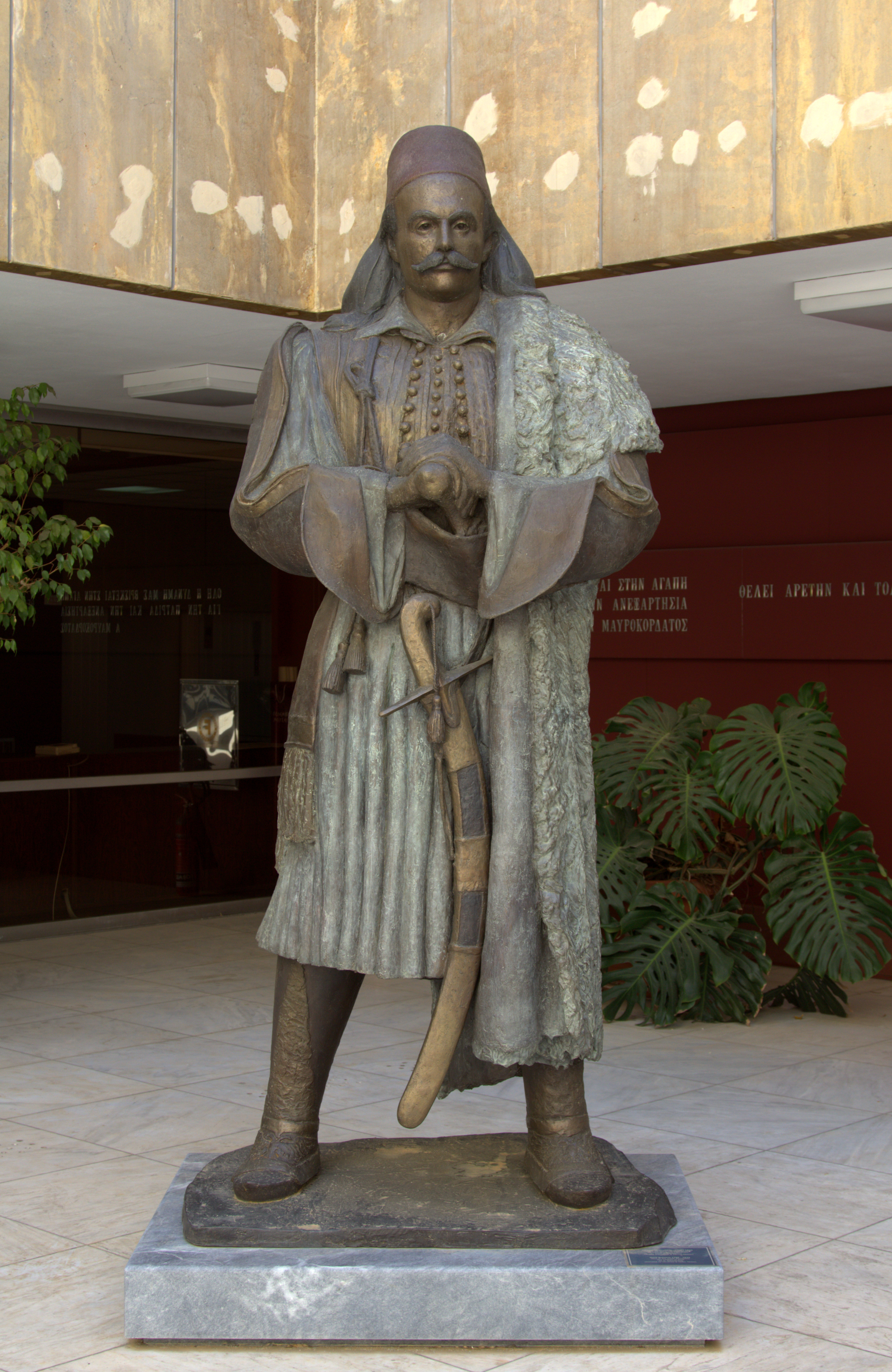
A statue of Markos Botsaris at the Athens War Museum

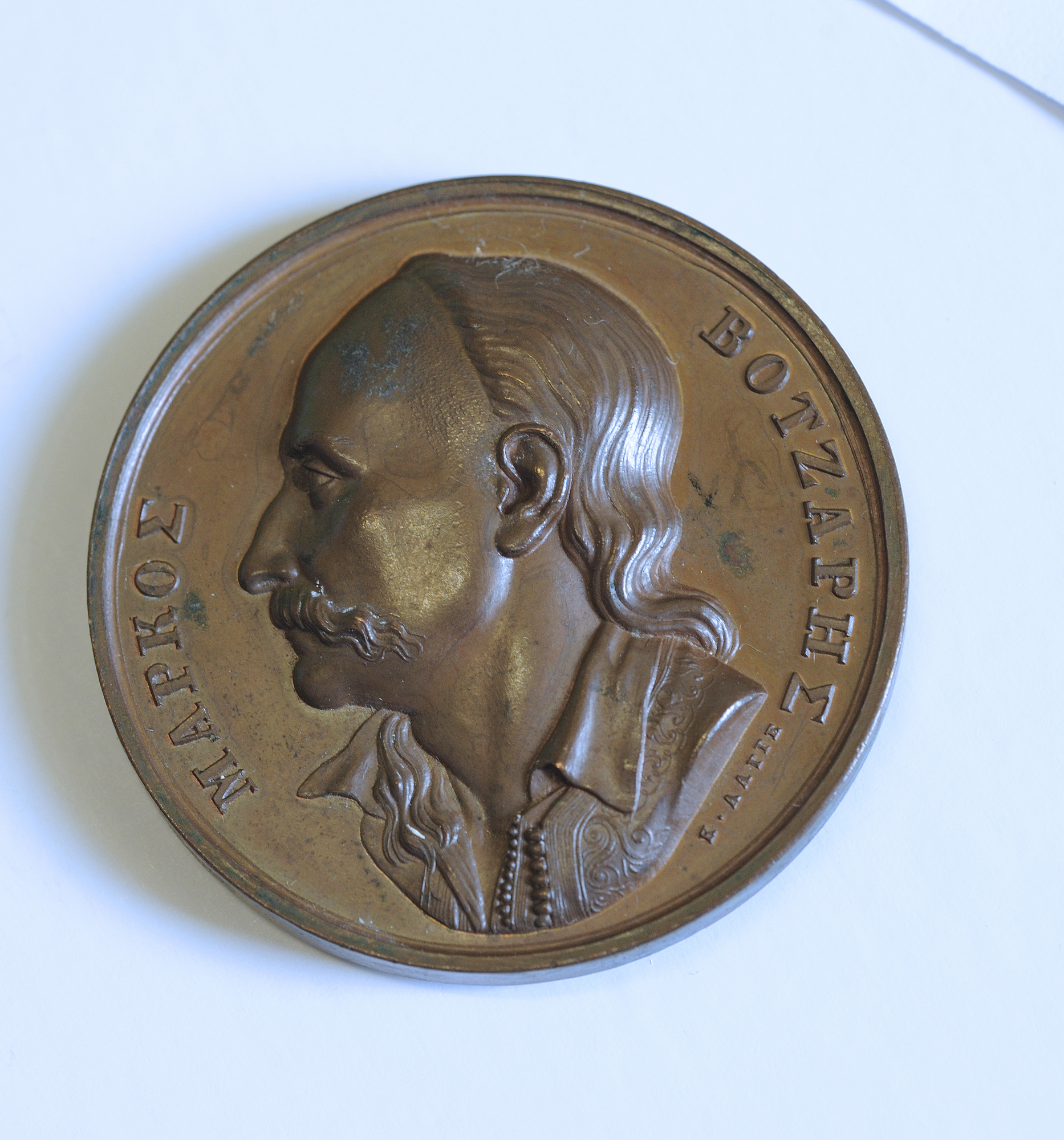
A medal depicting Markos Botsaris

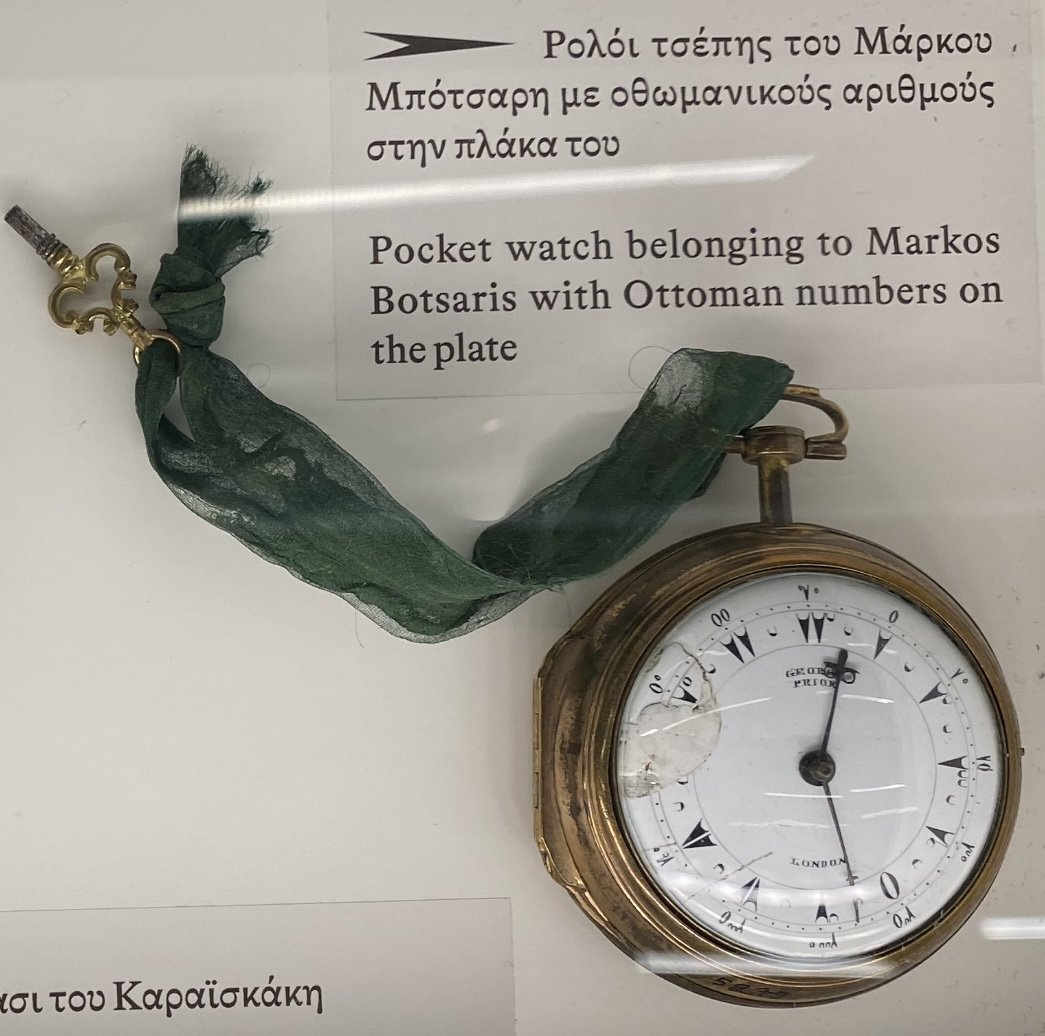
The pocket watch of Markos Botsaris at the National Historical Museum, Athens

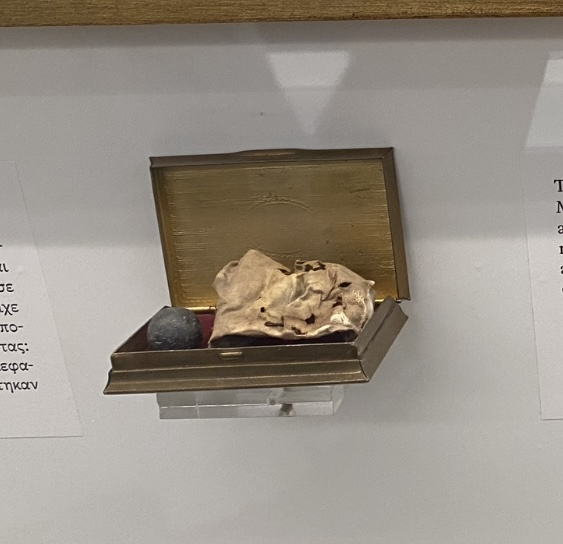
The musket ball that killed Markos Botsaris at the National Historical Museum, Athens

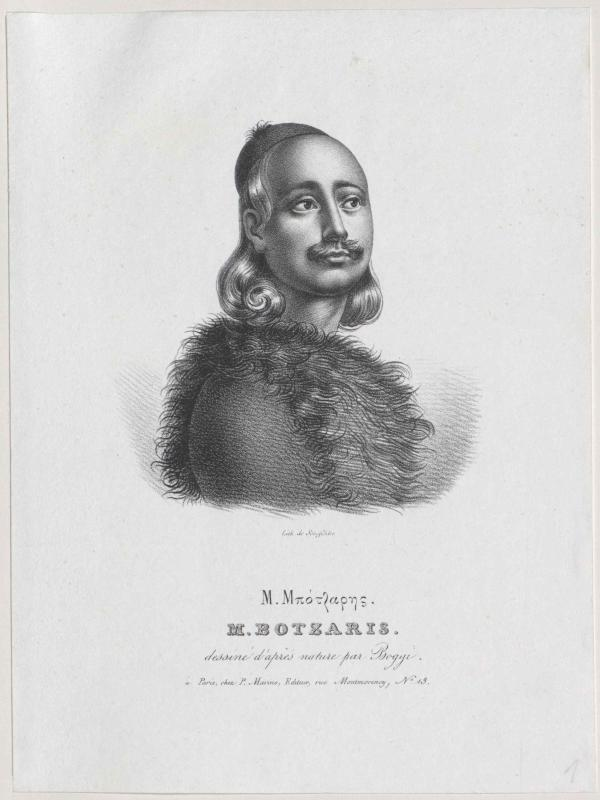
Markos Botsaris by Giovanni Boggi, 1826.

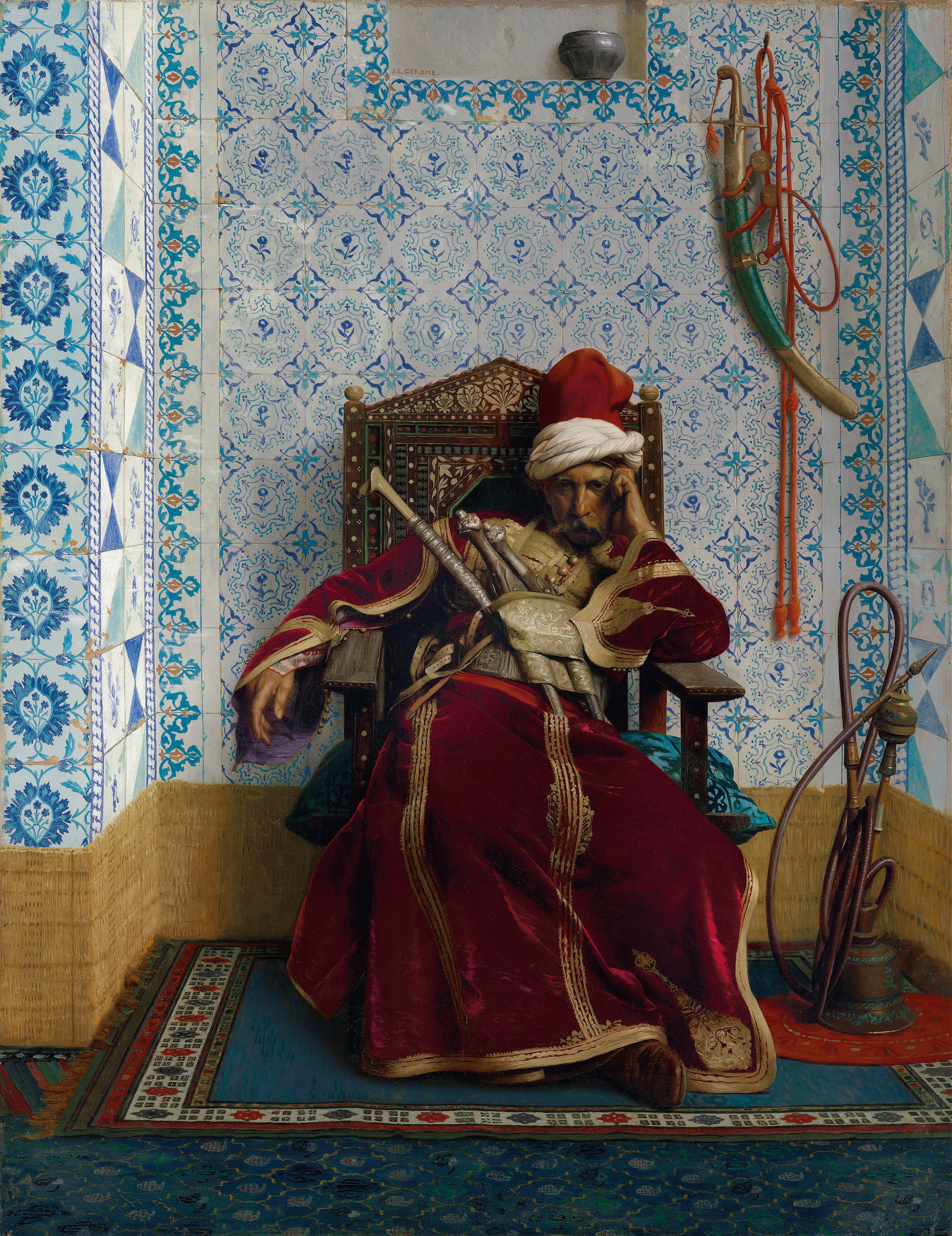
Markos Botsaris by Jean-Léon Gérôme (1874)

== Sources ==
- Γεωργούδης, Ντίνος (1995). "Περὶ τὸ Ἑλληνο-αλβανικὸ Λεξικὸ τοῦ Μάρκου Μπότσαρη". Νεοελληνική παιδεία και κοινωνία: Πρακτικά διεθνούς συνεδρίου αφιερωμένου στη μνήμη του Κ. Θ. Δημαρά. Athens: Ομιλος Μελέτης Ελληνικού Διαφωτισμού. pp. 221–226.
- Ψιμούλη, Βάσω Δ. (2006). Σούλι και Σουλιώτες. Ιστορία και Πολιτική (4th ed.). Athens: Βιβλιοπωλείον της Εστίας.
  - Psimuli, Vaso Dh. (2016). Suli dhe suljotët [Souli and the Souliots]. Toena. ISBN 9789928205728.
- Ψιμούλη, Βάσω (2010). Βασίλης Παναγιωτόπουλος (ed.). Μάρκος Μπότσαρης. Ιστορική Βιβλιοθήκη - Οι Ιδρυτές της Νεότερης Ελλάδας. Athens: Τα Νέα.
- Botsaris, 180 Years from the Greek Revolution
- Lloshi, Xhevat (2008). Rreth Alfabetit te Shqipes. Logos. ISBN 9789989582684.
