= Giovanni Boggi =

Italian painter

Giovanni Boggi (c.1770 - 1832) was an Italian engraver and painter, in his artistic prime in the 1820s. Several of his works are on display at the Bibliothèque Nationale, Paris. He was especially noted for his portraits of important Greek people, particularly from the War of Greek Independence, including Markos Botsaris, a Souliote captain, and Theodoros Kolokotronis (1825). He also made portraits of Francesco Algarotti and Luigi Lanzi.

== Gallery ==
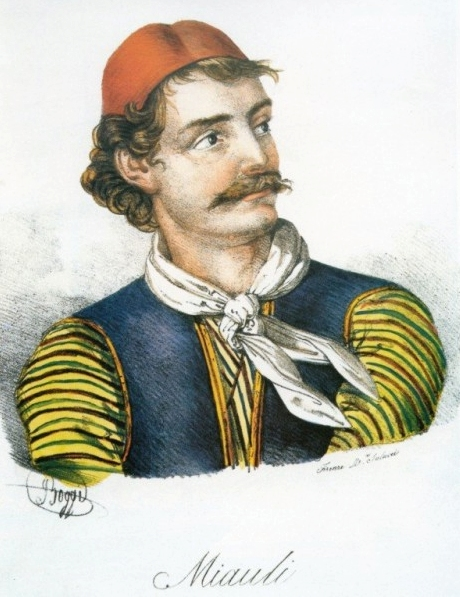
Andreas Miaoulis by Boggi

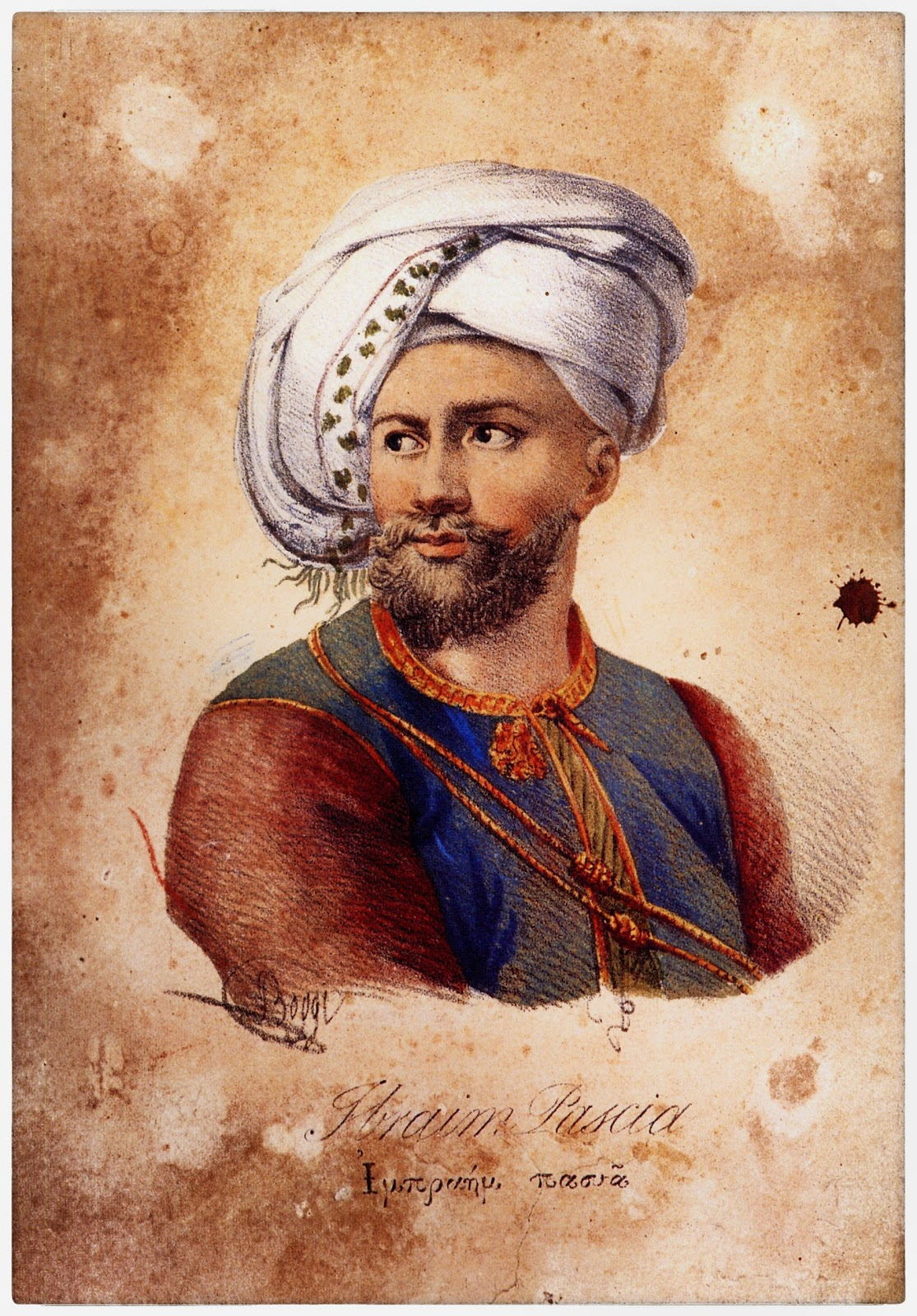
Ibrahim Pasha of Egypt
