= Acherontas =

Acherontas Αχέροντας
- Municipal unit
- Location within the regional unit

- Location within Greece
- Coordinates: 39°21′N 20°34′E
- Country: Greece
- Administrative region: Epirus
- Regional unit: Thesprotia
- Municipality: Souli

Area
  - Municipal unit: 67.3 km^{2} (26.0 sq mi)

Population (2021)
  - Municipal unit: 1,947
  - Municipal unit density: 28.9/km^{2} (74.9/sq mi)
- Time zone: UTC+2 (EET)
  - Summer (DST): UTC+3 (EEST)
- Vehicle registration: ΗΝ

Acherontas (Greek: Αχέροντας) is a former municipality in Thesprotia, Epirus, Greece. Since the 2011 local government reform it is part of the municipality Souli, of which it is a municipal unit. The municipal unit has an area of 67.343 km^{2}. It was named after the river Acheron. Population 1,947 (2021). The seat of the municipality was in Gardiki Souli.
