= First siege of Missolonghi =

1822 battle of the Greek War of Independence

Coordinates: 38.3680°N 21.4280°E

- Part of the Greek War of Independence
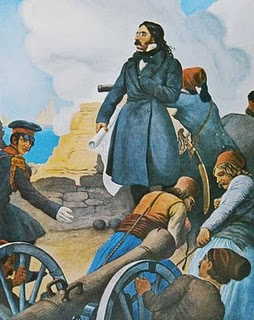
- Alexandros Mavrokordatos defends Missolonghi by Peter von Hess
Date	25 October – 31 December 1822 (2 months and 6 days)
Location	Missolonghi, Sanjak of Karli-Eli, Ottoman Empire (now Aetolia-Acarnania, Greece)
Result	Greek victory

Belligerents
(Greece) First Hellenic Republic: Souliot Forces	Ottoman Empire

Commanders and leaders
(Greece) Alexandros Mavrokordatos (Greece) Athanasios Razi-Kotsikas; Markos Botsaris	Omer Vrioni; Reşid Mehmed Pasha; Yusuf Pasha

Strength
2,000; 14 guns	11,000

Casualties and losses
4	More than 500

The first siege of Missolonghi (Greek: Πρώτη πολιορκία του Μεσολογγίου) was an attempt by Ottoman forces to capture the strategically located port town of Missolonghi during the early stages of the Greek War of Independence.

== Siege ==
After the Battle of Peta and the fall of Souli, the road to Missolonghi for the Ottomans was clear. An Ottoman force of 11,000 troops, led by Omer Vrioni and Reşid Mehmed Pasha, alongside part of the Ottoman fleet led by Yussuf Pasha of Patras besieged the town on 25 October 1822. Inside the fortified town, there were Alexandros Mavrokordatos, Markos Botsaris, Athanasios Razi-Kotsikas and around six hundred men with fourteen guns. The food and ammunition they possessed would last for only a month. The Ottomans could have easily taken the city with an attack, but they instead started negotiations with the besieged. The Greeks took advantage of this, dragging the negotiations out until reinforcements from the south arrived in November. The Greek fleet targeted the Ottoman ships. More than 1,000 soldiers with food disembarked, relieving the besieged Greeks who subsequently ceased the negotiations. Upon realising their mistake, the Ottomans resumed the siege in earnest.

After a month of bombardment and sorties, the main Ottoman assault was set for the night of 24 December, just before Christmas, expecting that the Greeks would be caught by surprise. Unbeknownst to the Ottomans, the Greeks were warned by Vrioni's Greek secretary, allowing them to make preparations and causing the Ottomans to lose the element of surprise. In the upcoming conflict, the Turks were defeated and the siege was subsequently lifted on December 31. The Ottoman army, while retreating, passed through the flooded Achelous River, where more than five hundred men drowned.

== Aftermath ==
Missolonghi remained under Greek control, and resisted another Ottoman attempt at its capture a year later. Its resistance achieved wider fame when Lord Byron arrived there, dying in the town of fever in April 1824. The city was besieged for a third and final time, resisting both Ottoman and Egyptian armies for almost a year, until its final fall on 10 April 1826.

== See also ==
- Dimitrios Deligeorgis, a battery commander during the first siege
- Second siege of Missolonghi
- Third siege of Missolonghi
