= Kitsos Botsaris =

Leader of the Souliotes

Kitsos Botsaris (Albanian: Kiço Boçari; Greek: Κίτσος Μπότσαρης); 1741 in Souli – 1813, in Arta), was a leader of the Souliotes, an autonomous community in Ottoman-ruled Epirus. He played a leading role during the 1789 Souliote War, which was fought by the Souliotes against Ali Pasha of Ioannina. He was the father of Kostas Botsaris and Markos Botsaris, who would later fight against the Ottomans in the Greek War of Independence.

== Activity during the Souliote War ==
Kitsos Botsaris was a prominent figure of the Botsaris Souliote clan, which originated from Ampelia, south of Paramythia. He was the son of Georgios Botsaris and the brother of Notis Botsaris. He was the leader of the Souliotes during the wars against Ali Pasha at the end of 18th century. In 1792, Ali Pasha planned a second expedition against Souli. He tried to deceive and arrest the Souliote warriors, by pretending that he was going to attack Gjirokastër and would need their assistance. Ali sent a letter to Kitsos written in Greek, which was published in its entirety by William Eton:

My friends Captain Bozia (Botsaris) and Captain Giavella (Tzavellas), I, Ali Pasha, salute you and kiss your eyes because I well know your courage and heroic minds. It appears to me that I have great need of you, therefore, I entreat you immediately, when you receive my letter, to assemble all your heroes, and come to meet me, that I may go to fight my enemies. This is the hour and the time that I have need of you. I expect to see your friendship, and the love which you have for me. Your pay shall be double that which I give to the Albanians, because I know that your courage is greater than theirs; therefore I will not go to fight before you come, and I expect that you will come foon. This only, and I salute you.

Kitsos understood the stratagem and professed to Ali that he could not help him because could not persuade his people. Captain Tzavellas, who did accept Ali's offer, was soon arrested along with his 70 warriors by Ali Pasha’s army. After this incident, Ali marched against Souli, which was under Kitsos' general command. Soon Tzavellas managed to escape from Ali by offering his 12-year-old son, Fotos Tzavelas, as hostage, and joined the Souliotes. Kitsos ordered the Souliotes to withdraw to inaccessible mountainous fortresses with provisions for 6 months. At the same time, he poisoned the local wells so that the Ottomans would have no easy access to water. After some battles, the main body of the Ali's army was lured into an ambush and was annihilated. The rest retreated in panic back to Ioannina, while Ali himself escaped with difficulty, exhausting to death two of his horses while fleeing.

== See also ==
- Greek War of Independence
- Markos Botsaris
- Kostas Botsaris
- Souliotes

== Bibliography ==
- Hughes, T.S. (2014). Travels in Sicily, Greece and Albania. Cambridge Library Collection - European History. Cambridge University Press.
- Asiatic Journal and Monthly Register for British and Foreign India, China and Australasia. Vol. 25. Black, Parbury, & Allen. 1828. p. 762.
- Sakellariou, M. V. (1997). Epirus, 4000 years of Greek history and civilization (in Greek). Ekdotikē Athēnōn. ISBN 978-960-213-371-2.
- Eton, William (1799). A survey of the Turkish empire. Bodleian Library.
