= Second siege of Missolonghi =

1823 siege

Coordinates: 38.4472°N 21.3692°E

- Part of the Greek War of Independence
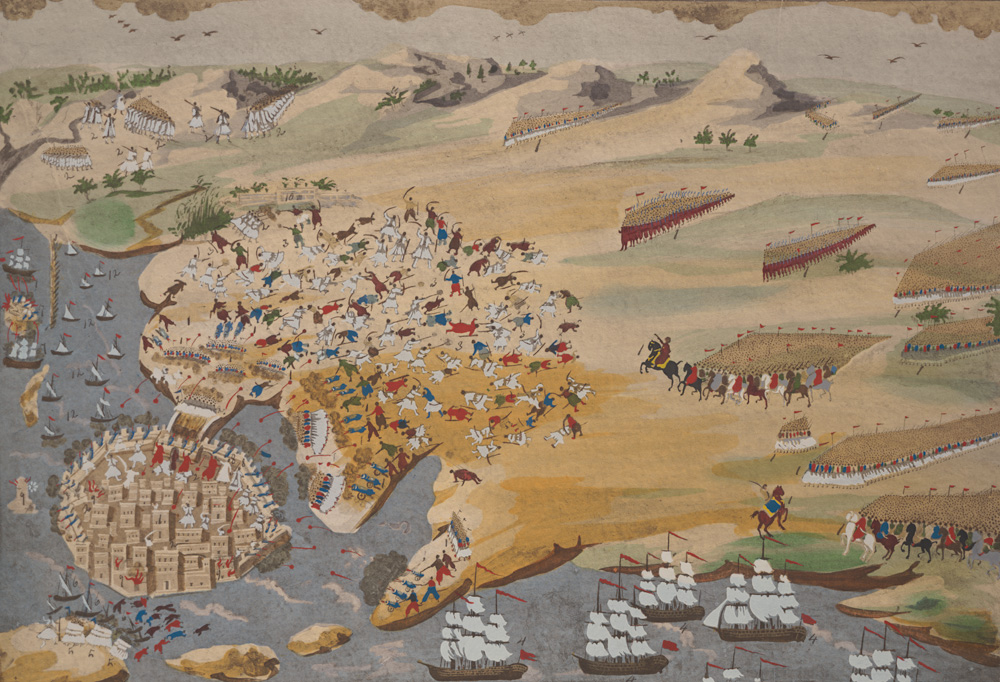
Date	20 September – 30 November 1823 (2 months, 1 week and 3 days)
Location	Missolonghi, Sanjak of Karli-Eli, Ottoman Empire (now Aetolia-Acarnania, Greece)
Result	Greek victory

Belligerents
(Greece) First Hellenic Republic: Souliot Forces	Ottoman Empire: Pashalik of Scutari

Commanders and leaders
(Greece) Konstantinos Metaxas; Kitsos Tzavelas	Omer Vrioni; Mustafa Pasha Bushatli

Strength
3,500	Unknown

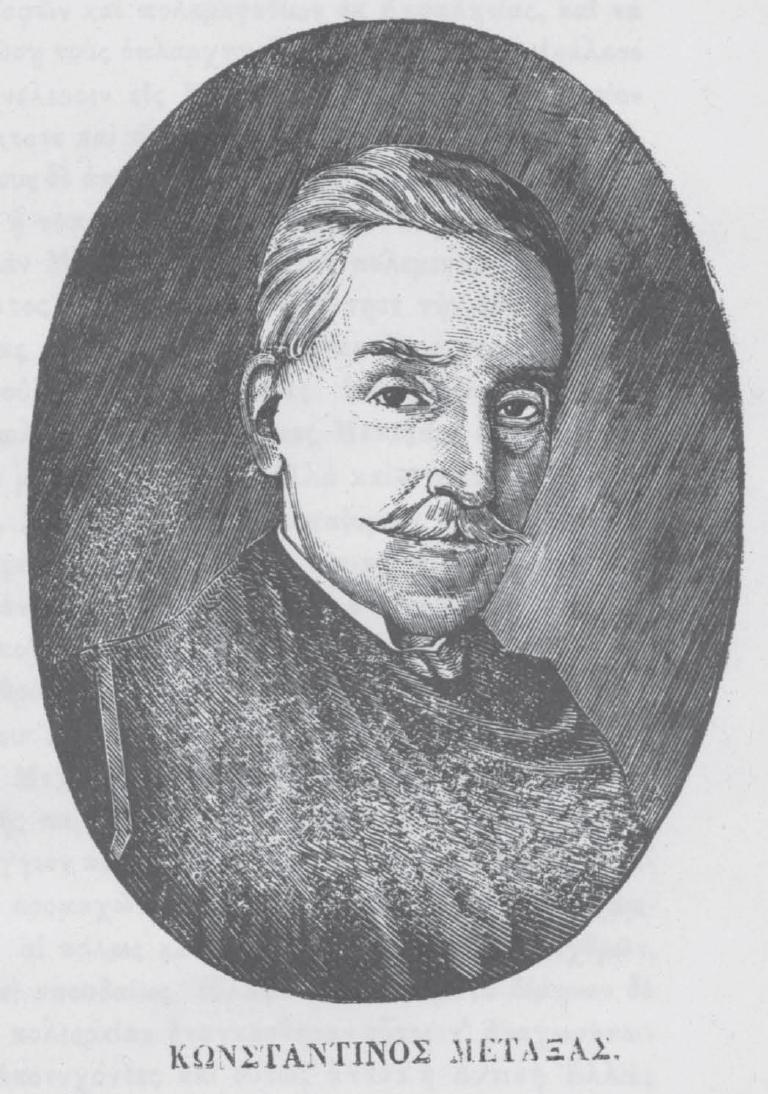
Konstantinos Metaxas

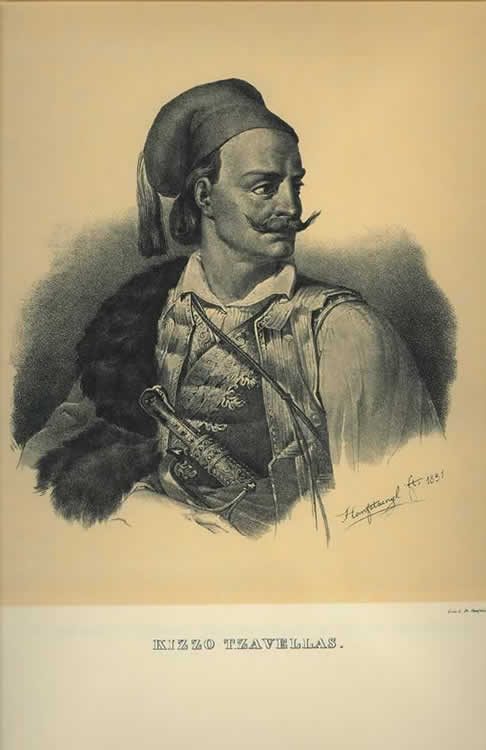
Kitsos Tzavelas

The second siege of Missolonghi was the second attempt by Ottoman forces to capture the strategically located port town of Missolonghi during the third year of the Greek War of Independence (1823). The second siege is usually ignored however, and the name is often applied to the greater siege of 1825–1826.

== Background ==
After the first unsuccessful attempt to take the town in 1822, another expedition to western Central Greece was undertaken, this time by Mustafa Pasha of Scutari. Mustafa proceeded through the city of Trikala to Karpenisi, where a first Greek attempt to stop his advance resulted in the Battle of Karpenisi. During this battle, the Albanian casualties were 1,000 troops, but the Greeks lost their commander, Markos Botsaris. The second unsuccessful Greek attempt to stop Mustafa at Mount Kaliakouda, on 29 August 1823, resulted in 200 Greek casualties.

== Siege ==
On 17 September the Albanian army was joined by Omer Vrioni and his troops. The two pashas decided to cooperate and siege Missolonghi and Aitoliko, an island which controlled the seaways of the Missolonghi lagoon. The Albanian army arrived before Missolonghi and began the siege on 20 September with a bombardment of Aitoliko. The subsequent attack on Aitoliko failed however. Thousands of cannonballs were fired against the island and only a few of them found their target.

On 17 November, Ottoman food supplies were seized by 250 Souliotes under command of Kitsos Tzavelas. Soon, inside the Albanian camp, clashes between Ghegs and Mirdites occurred due to the lack of food.

Meanwhile rumors arrived that the Ottoman campaign in Eastern Central Greece had failed and damaged the morale of those laying siege. As a result of food shortages and disease, on 20 November Mustafa Pasha lifted the siege, withdrew and retreated to modern-day North Albania. The siege had taken place in early winter, so its premature end was inevitable.

== Aftermath ==
Missolonghi remained under Greek control. Its resistance achieved wider fame when Lord Byron arrived there, dying in the town of fever in April 1824. The city was besieged for a third and final time, resisting both Ottoman and Egyptian armies for almost a year, until its final fall on 10 April 1826.

== See also ==
- First siege of Missolonghi
- Third siege of Missolonghi

== Sources ==
- Δημήτρη Φωτιάδη,Ιστορία του 21,ΜΕΛΙΣΣΑ,1971,σελ.350-353.
- Μεταξά Κώστα,Ιστορικά Απομνημονέυματα εκ τής Ελληνικής Επανασταστάσεως, Αθήνα 1878 (εκδ.Β, Τσουκαλά 1956),σελ.96,97,107,111
- Κουτσονίκα Λ.,Γενική Ιστορία της Ελληνικής Επαναστάσεως, Αθήνα 1863-1864 (εκδ.Β, Τσουκαλά 1956) σελ.186
