= Albanian Regiment (France) =

- Active: 1807–1814
- Allegiance: French Empire
- Branch: French Imperial Army
- Type: Irregular light infantry
- Engagements: Napoleonic Wars: Adriatic Campaign; Siege of Santa Maura

Commanders
- Commander: Jean-Louis Toussaint Minot

The Albanian Regiment (French: Régiment albanais) was a military unit of the First French Empire formed in 1807 in Corfu. Consisting mainly of Albanians, but also Greeks, Italians and Dalmatians, it was commanded by Colonel Jean-Louis Toussaint Minot and served mainly as a defense unit in the French-ruled Ionian Islands. It was disbanded in 1814.

== History ==
=== Background ===
The Albanian regiment traces its origins back to a previous Venetian regiment that was transferred to French service in 1797, along with an Albanian militia that was raised by the Russians in 1799 and that was transferred to the French in 1807.

In 1804, after the Ottoman Albanian ruler Ali Pasha of Ioannina conquered their homeland, some 3,000 Souliotes settled in the Ionian Islands, i.e. the islands of Corfu, Paxoi, Lefkada (Santa Maura), Ithaca, Cephalonia, Zakynthos (Zante) and Kythira (Cerigo), then comprising the Russian-dominated Septinsular Republic. In view of the rapprochement between the Ottoman Empire and Napoleon's French Empire, the Russians began to recruit the Souliotes, both for local defence, as well as for a potential offensive against Ali Pasha. Soon the Souliotes, along with Himariotes, Acarnanians, and Moreotes, were recruited into the Greek Legion, which was placed under the command of the Greek-born Russian Major-General Emmanouil Papadopoulos. In autumn 1805 the Greek Legion participated in the Anglo-Russian invasion of Naples, and in 1806 it fought against the French at the Bay of Kotor. However, in the Treaty of Tilsit, Russia returned the Septinsular Republic to France and the legion was disbanded on 30 August 1807. The majority of the legionnaires received recommendation letters from the Russian army and were recruited into the French Albanian Regiment under the condition of never fighting against Russia.

=== Establishment ===
The return of French rule found some 3,000 Albanian armed members of the Legion and other Greek military formations in the Ionian Islands. As they were mostly recruited from mainland refugees, they posed a problem for the new authorities. To keep them disciplined and maintain order, the new French Governor-General, César Berthier, recruited these men into French service, but the exact manner of their employment was left open. Berthier initially suggested creating independent Greco-Albanian companies to serve alongside regular French line infantry regiments as skirmishers (tirailleurs) or light mountain infantry (chasseurs de montagne), and even proposed that two such companies be attached to the royal guards of Napoleon and his brother Joseph Bonaparte, the King of Naples.

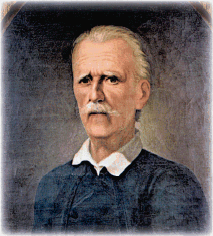
Christoforos Perraivos

This plan was soon shelved, and Berthier decided to form a single corps, under the command of Christakis Kalogeros from Preveza. This choice provoked much opposition from the former Legion members, however. This agitation may have resulted in part because the Souliotes, whose loyalty was determined by ties of kinship rather than any formal military hierarchy, were unwilling to accept being subordinated to a commander not of their own clan. The French scholar Auguste Boppe also adds an element of ethnic rivalry, since the Souliotes were Albanian-speakers and Kalogeros was Greek, but this is unlikely to be the main reason when the Greek Papadopoulos had commanded the same men for over two years. A prominent member of the corps, Christoforos Perraivos, provides an entirely different explanation in his memoirs, whereby Kalogeros had incurred the enmity of his fellow officers after denouncing his previous allegiance to the Russian Emperor to the French. The Souliotes in particular saw this as contrary to their code of honour; according to Perraivos, having once sworn allegiance to the Tsar, they intended to honour that promise, and insisted that they would fight for the French against all enemies, except Russia.

The French authorities initially tended to view this mutiny with hostility, and the difficulty of dealing with the intransigent former Legion members led to Berthier having a very low opinion of them. In the end, on 12 December, the French established the Albanian Regiment (Régiment albanais) with a nominal strength of 3,254 men in three battalions of nine companies each, and a 14-member command staff. The terms 'Greek' and 'Albanian' were used somewhat indiscriminately by the French at the time—the Albanian Regiment included Albanians, among whom Souliotes and Himariotes, as well as mainland Greeks, and even Dalmatians and Italians.

The first three battalion commanders were the Moreote Anagnostaras, the Himariote Konstantinos Androutsis (a veteran of the Neapolitan Army), and Kalogeros, although by February 1808 he was replaced by the Souliote Fotos Tzavellas. To command the regiment, the French chose Colonel Jean-Louis Toussaint Minot, a veteran of the campaigns of Italy and Egypt, who approached his task with zeal and diligence, investigating the qualities and loyalties of each of the officers under his command. However, the French failed to attach to the regiment any Greek officers serving in the French regular regiments, who might have been able to better handle matters of discipline, language, and customs, and help integrate the unit better with the regular forces. In part this is probably due to the relative scarcity of such men in the French army, unlike the Russians who had a longer history of Greeks serving in their army.

Kalogeros was moved to command the eight companies of Greek Foot Chasseurs (Chasseurs à pied Grecs), also known as Pandours of Albania (Pandours de Albanie), comprising eight companies with 951 men in total. According to the historian Nicholas Pappas, their creation may have been solely a means of separating the supporters of Kalogeros from his opponents within the Albanian Regiment. At any rate, this distinction did not last long, for the Chasseurs à pied Grecs were again amalgamated into the Albanian Regiment in July 1809. In its new form, the Albanian Regiment numbered 150 officers and 2,934 other ranks in six battalions, an organization very similar to that of the former Legion. Each battalion was placed under the command of a prominent chieftain: Konstantinos Androutsis, Christos Kalogeros, Fotos Tzavellas, Christakis Kalogeros, Kitsos Botsaris, and Anagnostaras. Surviving lists of the members of the battalion of Fotos Tzavellas show that, in line with Souliote customs, the officers were drawn from the main members of his clan and allied or related families. Auguste Boppe mentions that the regiment had a chaplain (Arsenio Yanucco from the Morea) and a surgeon (Ducca Zappa).

=== Service ===
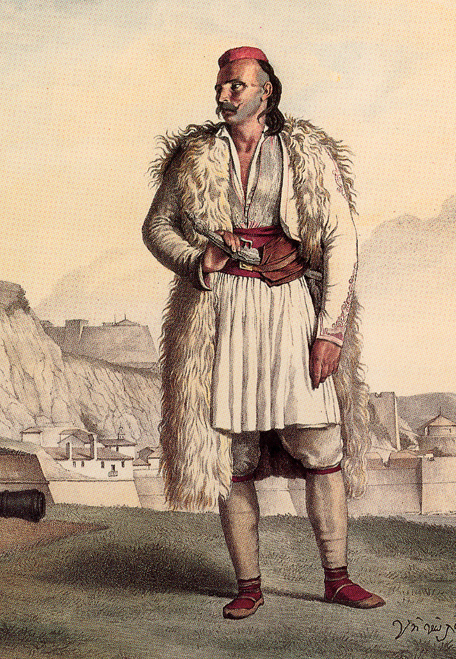
A Souliote warrior in Corfu

From the outset, the Albanian Regiment was intended for garrison duties on the Ionian Islands, so as to minimize the need to deploy French troops, apart from Corfu itself. For this purpose, the Regiment was complemented by the 'Septinsular Battalion' (Bataillon Septinsulaire), drawn from the native militia of the Ionian Islands, and a 146-strong cavalry unit, the 'Ionian Horse Chasseurs' (Chasseurs à cheval ioniennes). From 1809, to these were added the remnants of the earlier Chasseurs d'Orient regiment of Greek volunteers.

==== Plans for employment against Ali Pasha ====
As their relations with Ali Pasha deteriorated over his ambitions against the mainland exclave of Parga, the French twice considered using the men of the Regiment to against the mainland, but nothing came of these plans. The first and more ambitious plan is related in the memoirs of the Greek chieftain Theodoros Kolokotronis, subsequently one of the main leaders of the Greek War of Independence: the Albanian Regiment, along with French artillerymen and Cham Albanians to be recruited by his Muslim Albanian blood brother, Ali Farmaki, were to land in the Morea and overthrow Ali Pasha's son Veli Pasha. In his place they would install a joint Christian-Muslim government, while the French mediated with the Porte to secure its approval. According to Kolokotronis, the plan was about to be carried out in 1809, when it was thwarted by the British occupation of Zakynthos, Cephalonia, Kythira, and Ithaca.

The second attempt involved a detachment of 25 men of the Regiment, under Lt. Colonel Androutsis, who were sent to aid the Himariotes against Ali Pasha's forces in October 1810. Their ship foundered near Porto Palermo, however, and when attacked by Ali's forces, they were captured and taken prisoner to his capital, Ioannina. According to Pappas, this expedition may have been a reconnoitring action in view of then current French designs for an invasion of the Balkans. The French applied diplomatic pressure to have Androutsis and his men released, but Androutsis was found dead, allegedly after falling from his cell window, just after the French secured his release. Ali Pasha was also suspected to be behind the deaths of Fotos Tzavellas, who died on 4 November 1810 of a sudden illness, as well as the murder of Kitsos Botsaris by Gogos Bakolas in Arta in 1813. According to Souliote custom, Tzavellas was succeeded in his rank and command by his twenty-year old firstborn son, Nikolaos Tzavellas. The rapid rise of the young man to this post over older and more experienced men, caused problems both with the other officers and men, and with Colonel Minot. In the end, in December Nikolaos was replaced by the veteran Thanasis Fotomaras.

==== British landings on the southern Ionian Islands and defections ====
In October 1809, the British attacked and captured Zakynthos, Cephalonia, Kythira, and Ithaca. These islands were defended by small garrisons, with a few dozen regular French soldiers and larger numbers of men of the Albanian Regiment (400 on Zakynthos, 145 on Cephalonia, 46 on Ithaca, and 27 on Kythira) on each island. These forces were completely inadequate to offer anything but a token resistance; the captured men were transferred to Italy as prisoners of war, but more than a few of the Regiment's men—up to about half in Zakynthos—simply scattered into the countryside and resumed their traditional guerrilla habits. Most of these escapees, as well as those taken prisoner, were soon induced to enter British service in what eventually became the 1st Regiment Greek Light Infantry. Over 70% of the Albanian Regiment's men on the four islands switched to the British, including most of the officers.

==== Fall of Lefkada ====
These defections made the French increasingly distrustful towards the remaining men of the Regiment, doubts which were enhanced further after the entire detachment of 823 men on Lefkada, apart from 13 men the French held as hostages, defected to the British when the latter landed there in March 1810. The remaining officers of the Regiment justified this desertion by the neglect shown to their colleagues by the local French commander, General Camus, who had retired with his French troops to the Castle of Santa Maura, while leaving the Albanian Regiment men outside to confront the British. This decision not only left the lightly equipped men of the Albanian Regiment exposed to the elements, but Camus also refused to give shelter to their families in the fortress. Indeed, from the reports of the British and the memoirs of the Greeks already enlisted to fight in their ranks, it is clear that the men of the Albanian Regiment resisted the initial offer to defect, and only surrendered after their situation had become hopeless. After the fall of Lefkada, Colonel Kitsos Botsaris, as the senior native Regiment officer, was court-martialled on suspicion of contacts with the British, but acquitted.

==== Departure of Minot and reduction of the Regiment ====
Nevertheless, these events led Napoleon to order the splitting of the Regiment in October 1810, with 1,000 men kept in the remaining French possessions (Corfu, Paxoi, and Parga on the mainland) and the rest either sent with their families to serve in southern Italy or to return them to the mainland. This decision was not implemented, as neither the Neapolitan government was willing to accept them, nor did the members of the Regiment accept being moved to Italy, citing their previous terms of service agreed with the Russians and confirmed by General Berthier.

With the capture and subsequent death of Androutsis at that time, the senior native officer once again became Christakis Kalogeros. His appointment again proved a source of discontent, as did Colonel Minot's increasing dissatisfaction with his "most distasteful command"; his ambitions were to command regular troops, but his attempts to impose strict discipline on his men only served to alienate them. This was in stark contrast to Minot's British counterpart, Richard Church, who enjoyed the respect and admiration of his men; his reputation was such that he was held in high esteem even among the men of the Albanian Regiment.

In 1812, Minot proposed splitting the unit in two, with an "elite" 500-man detachment intended for Napoleon's Imperial Guard (and which Minot hoped to accompany to the Emperor's presence) and the remaining men, about a thousand, either reduced to depots or returned to the mainland. The proposal was not supported by the French governor-general, François-Xavier Donzelot, who preferred to keep the Regiment in Corfu, albeit reducing it to the "best" elements, with the remainder used to form a depot. The possibility of merging the regiment with another, older Greek unit in French service, the Chasseurs d'Orient, was also raised. By late 1813/early 1814, the Regiment was re-organized and its force was reduced from six to two battalions of c. 600 men each, while the remainder were placed in a reserves depot. Minot was also transferred away with Kalogeros assuming interim command. Unlike Minot, Donzelot was keen to attend to the welfare of the Regiment's men, even going as far as taking a personal loan of 100,000 francs (for which he was never fully repaid by the French government) to cover their arrears in pay.

==== Defence and surrender of Parga and Paxoi ====
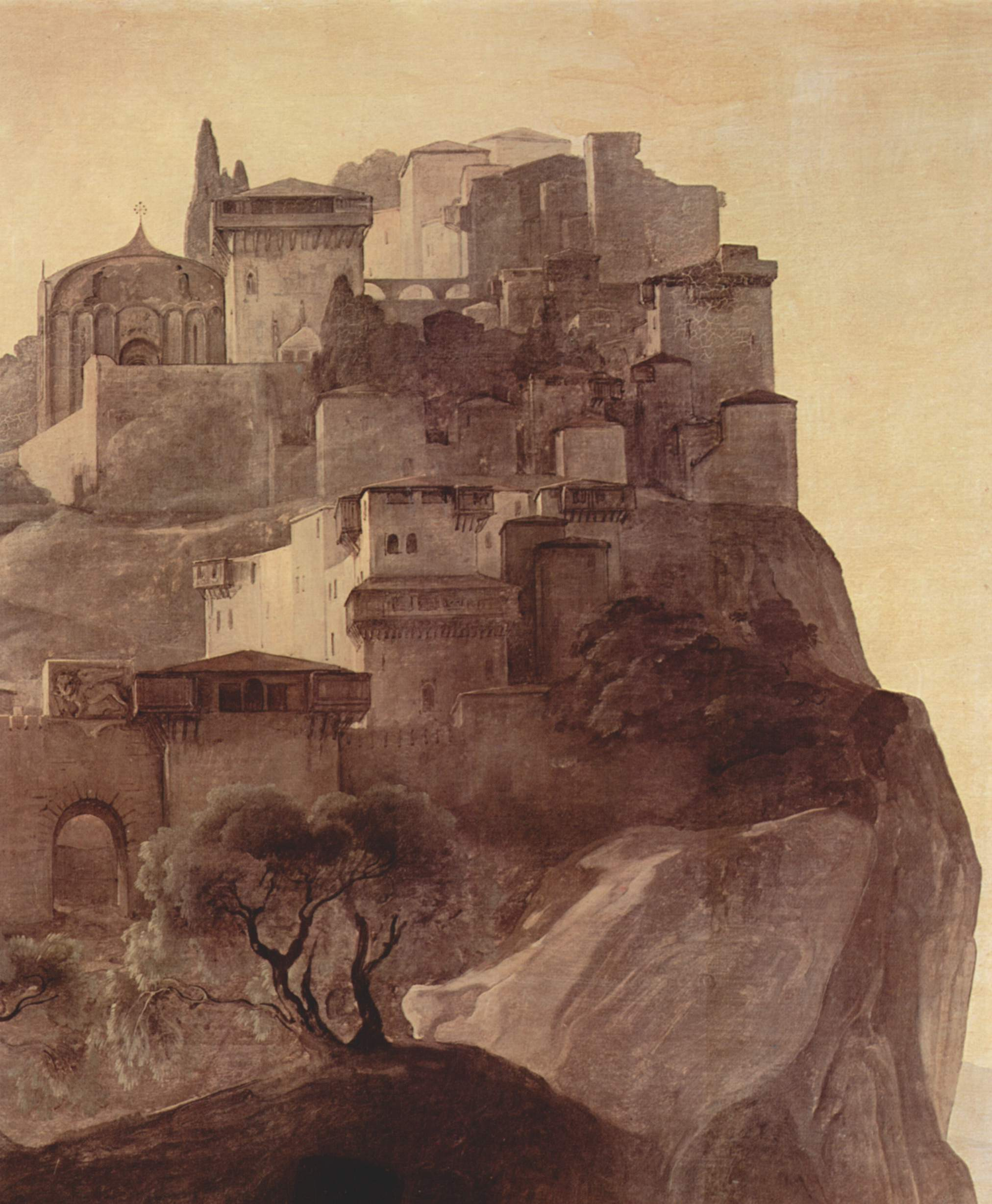
Depiction of the fortress of Parga, from a painting by Francesco Hayez (1791–1882)

In the meantime, two companies of the Regiment had been deployed in Parga, defending the exclave against Ali Pasha's forces, along with a small number of French and Italian regulars and a local militia, all under the command of Colonel Nicole Papas Oglou, the former commander of the Chasseurs d'Orient. Despite some successes in skirmishes around the town, by the end of 1813 the Pasha's men had reduced the defenders to the town itself, while British ships blockaded it from the sea, giving rise to hardship and dissension among the defenders during the first months of 1814, especially once the French and Italians withdrew to the town's fortress and left the native troops outside.

In February 1814, the British, including elements of the Greek Light Infantry Regiment landed on Paxoi. 35 men of the Albanian Regiment were sent to reconnoitre the British force, but in the meantime, the Greek troops in the garrison of the fortress mutinied and handed it over to the British. Caught between vastly larger British forces, the detachment, under Apostolis Levantakis and Andreas Ninas, surrendered and entered British service as well.

Soon after, in early March, the British at Paxoi were contacted by the men of the Albanian Regiment and the Pargians and offered the surrender of Parga. After two British frigates appeared outside the town, the Albanian Regiment detachment and the Pargian militia stormed the fortress, captured the defenders and raised the British flag.

=== Disbandment and aftermath ===
The loss of Paxoi and Parga left Corfu as the sole French possession. The island was heavily garrisoned, but after the abdication of Napoleon and the restoration of Louis XVIII in April 1814, Donzelot sought terms with the British. The British initially sought to disband the regiment, as with all the French forces on the island, and repatriate its men. Donzelot, however, intervened with the British, suggesting to either take the men of the Albanian Regiment into their service, or at least undertake to maintain them for two months, during which they could return to their homelands. The British commander, Sir James Campbell, provisionally agreed to provide the same rations as for the two Greek Light Infantry Regiments already in British employ.

The British kept their promise, but in late June they disbanded more than half of the remaining men of the Regiment, with the remainder incorporated as a battalion in the 2nd Greek Light Infantry Regiment. Finally, in September 1814, the two Greek Light Infantry Regiments were also disbanded, although the process lasted into 1816. This was not only because the French military threat had been removed, but also in reaction to Ottoman protests at the existence of Greek armed units, and the British hopes to secure their control over the Ionian Islands with the diplomatic assistance of the Sublime Porte. Conversely, the Islanders, including the members of the disbanded Albanian Regiment, turned to Russia for assistance. A three-man delegation comprising Perraivos, Major Dimos Doukas, and Kitsos Tzavellas, set out to meet the Corfiot noble Ioannis Kapodistrias, who had served with them in the defence of Lefkada in 1807 and now was the principal advisor on foreign affairs to Tsar Alexander I of Russia in the Congress of Vienna. However, they were intercepted by the Austrian authorities, and Kapodistrias' own proposals for the restitution of the Septinsular Republic foundered due to Austrian opposition. As a result, on 5 November 1815, the Ionian Islands passed under British rule as the protectorate of the "United States of the Ionian Islands".

All non-British military formations were disbanded and even forbidden, with the exception of police and militia, while the large proportion of mainlanders active in the various regiments raised by the Russians, French, and British were prohibited from holding any position in them by restricting eligibility to native Islanders. This left them not only destitute and forced to seek other means of providing for their livelihood but, especially in the case of the Souliotes, it left them exposed to the reprisals of Ali Pasha, abetted by the harassment of the British authorities, who were eager to please the Ottomans and secure recognition of their rule. Nevertheless, left with no alternative, many former members of the Regiment made their peace with Ali Pasha and entered his service, including even some of the Souliotes. Other veterans of the Albanian Regiment, as well as the Greek Light Infantry Regiments, served in the Neapolitan army under Richard Church, who established the Battaglione dei Cacciatori Macedoni for the purpose, until its disbandment in 1820. Still others entered the armed bodyguards of the Phanariote rulers of Moldavia and Wallachia.

== Notable members of the Regiment ==
According to Boppe the Albanian Regiment deserves some attention only because it had in its ranks many heroes of the subsequent Greek Revolution of 1821 (Boppe, p. 3). Among the persons noted by this author and others are:

- Christoforos Perraivos, Greek major officer and author, fighter of the Greek Revolution (1821-1829) (Boppe, p. 11)(Perraivos, p. 77).
- Konstantinos Androutses from Himara. Commander of the 1st Battalion. He had served the French since 1799 when they occupied Naples as a commander and instructor. He recruited other Cheimariotes for the French army. He was given the rank of lieutenant colonel. He was arrested by the forces of Ali Pasha while aboard a French ship. The French authorities requested from the Ottoman Porte his release but he was murdered in an Ioannina prison. Ali Pasha tried to present his death as suicide. (Pappas, p. 48)(Boppe, p. 13, 15, 20)
- Kitsos Botsaris, the leader of the Botsaris souliotic clan, commander of the 5th Battalion (Boppe p. 15, Kallivretakis p. 193).
- Fotos Tzavellas, colonel, commander of the 3rd Battalion. A leader of the Tzavellas Souliote clan. Before the Regiment had participated in many battles of the Souliotes – Ali Pasha wars. He had also served in Corfou under the Russians. He was assassinated by agents of Ali Pasha in Corfou in 1809 (Boppe, p. 15).
- Lambros Gousis from Souli, second lieutenant of the 5th Company ("lochos") of the 1st Battalion, awarded the Saint Helena Medal (. Before the Regiment he had participated in many battles against Ali Pasha. After the Regiment he served in the foreign troops of the King of Naples, reason for which his compatriots gave him the nickname “Reginas”. He returned to Greece and formed his unit of Souliotes participating in the Greek Revolution of 1821-1829. After the Revolution he was promoted to Brigadier General and awarded the bronze “Aristeion of the War”, the first war medal (Cross) instituted by King Otto.

== See also ==
- 1st Regiment Greek Light Infantry, the unit's British counterpart
- Greek Legion (Septinsular Republic), the unit's Russian antecedent

== Sources ==
- Brnardic, Vladimir (2004). Napoleon's Balkan Troops. Illustrated by Darko Pavlovic. Bloomsbury. ISBN 9781841767000.
- Boppe, Auguste (1902). Le régiment Albanais (1807-1814) (in French). Paris: Berger-Levrault & Cie.
- Kallivretakis, Leonidas (2003). "Ένοπλα Ελληνικά σώματα στη δίνη των Ναπολεοντείων πολέμων (1798-1815)" [Greek armed corps in the throes of the Napoleonic wars (1798-1815)]. Ιστορία του Νέου Ελληνισμού 1770-2000, Τόμος 1: Η Οθωμανική κυριαρχία, 1770-1821 [History of Modern Hellenism 1770-2000, Volume 1: Ottoman rule, 1770-1821] (in Greek). Athens: Ellinika Grammata. pp. 185–200. hdl:10442/8780. ISBN 960-406-540-8.
- McNab, Chris (2009). Armies of the Napoleonic Wars: An Illustrated History. Osprey Publishing. ISBN 978-1-8460-3470-1.
- Pappas, Nicholas Charles (1991). Greeks in Russian Military Service in the Late 18th and Early 19th Centuries. Thessaloniki: Institute for Balkan Studies.
- Psimouli, Vaso (2006). Σούλι και Σουλιώτες [Souli and the Souliotes] (in Greek). Athens: Estia. ISBN 960-05-1207-8.
