= Dimitrios Botsaris =

Greek politician and Army officer

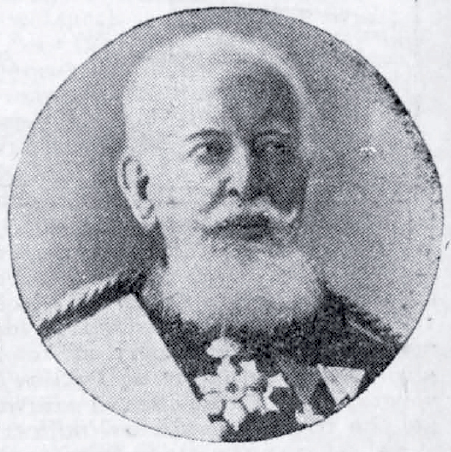
Dimitrios Botsaris

Dimitrios Botsaris (Greek: Δημήτριος Μπότσαρης; 1813–1871) was a Greek Army officer and politician. He served three times as Minister for Military Affairs.

== Life ==
Dimitrios Botsaris was the son of Markos Botsaris, hero of the Greek War of Independence and captain of the Souliotes. After his father's death (1823) and the independence of Greece (1828) he studied in the military academy of Munich, Germany. He was part of the Greek delegation by the approval of the King of Greece, Otto. He graduated there in 1833.

Botsaris then became an artillery officer in the Greek Army. In 1855 he became aid de camp of the king of Greece.

Dimitrios Botsaris served as Minister for Military Affairs (Greece) three times under kings Otto and George I. During his service there he founded the 'Officer's retirement fund' and the 'Fund for the treatment of non-commissioned officers and soldiers'.

Botsaris was promoted to Colonel at June 1, 1871, and became general inspector of the Army. He died at August 19 of the same year.

== See also ==
- Markos Botsaris
- Kostas Botsaris

== Bibliography ==
- Nikolaidou, Eleftheria Ι (1973). "Ο Δημήτριος Μάρκου Μπότσαρης (1814-1871) και η ανέκδοτη αλληλογραφία του με τον Κυβερνήτη Καποδίστρια". Dodoni. doi:10.26268/heal.uoi.9875.
