= Christoforos Perraivos =

Greek revolutionary and author (1773–1863)

- Χριστόφορος Περραιβός
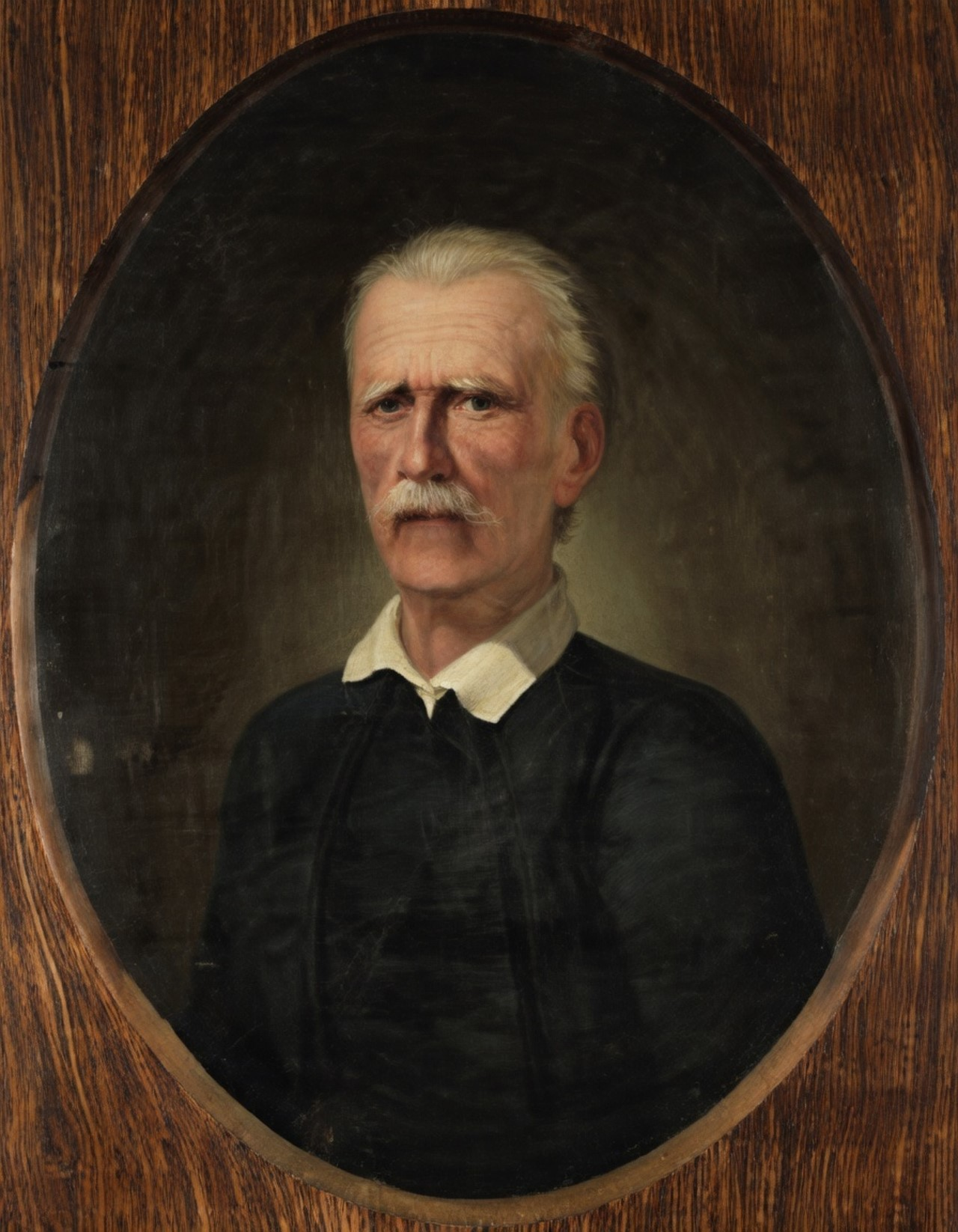
- Portrait at the National Historical Museum, Athens
- Born: Χριστόφορος Χατζηβασιλείου (Christoforos Hatzivasiliou); 3 April 1773; Palioi Poroi, Ottoman Greece
- Died: 4 May 1863 (aged 90); Athens, Kingdom of Greece
- Education: Princely Academy of Bucharest
- Military career
- Allegiance: French First Republic; Russian Empire; First French Empire; First Hellenic Republic; Kingdom of Greece
- Service years: 1798–1844
- Rank: General
- Conflicts: Greek War of Independence
- Other work: Teacher; Member of the Fourth National Assembly at Argos

Christoforos Perraivos (Greek: Χριστόφορος Περραιβός; 1773–1863) was a Greek officer of the Greek War of Independence, member of the Filiki Eteria, politician, educator and author. In non-Greek sources his name is usually found as Per(r)evo(s).

== Biography ==
Perraivos was born on 3 April 1773 in the village of Palioi Poroi, Pieria. His family name was Hatzivasiliou (Χατζηβασιλείου), but adopted the nickname “Perraivos” alluding to the Perrhaebi, an ancient Greek tribe of Thessaly. It is believed that he was an illegitimate son of a certain monk Hieronymos, an official at the Metropolis of Larissa.

In 1793, with the help of the said Hieronymos, he left Greece to study at the Greek School in Bucharest, and in 1796 to study medicine in Vienna. There he met the Greek humanist and revolutionary Rigas Feraios and entered an underground revolutionary organization. In 1797, Perraivos was arrested with Rigas and others by the Austrian authorities in Trieste but, unlike Rigas Feraios who was handed over to the Turks, Perraivos was released.

Afterwards, he left for Corfu, then under French administration, and enlisted in the foreign units of the French army. He remained there when the Russians took over the Ionian Islands in 1798. He fell into disfavour with the Russians but he managed to stay in Corfu and to serve in the army, thanks to the protection of the Greeks Eleftherios Benakis (a Russian agent) and Georgios Palatinos (secretary of the Russian Admiral). In Corfu, he worked also as a teacher in Greek schools from 1804. During 1805–1806, he was attached to the Russian admiral Mikhail Dolgorukov and later was given the rank of major by the Russian admiral Dmitry Senyavin. As a commander of 4 units of 100 men ("hekatontarchies") he defended the island of Lefkada (one of the Ionian islands, then "Santa Maura") that was threatened by Ali Pasha.

When the French occupied the Ionian Islands for a second time in 1807, he retained his rank and became a member of the Albanian Regiment, established the same year (Boppe, p. 11). Memoirs of his service under the Russians and the French are included in his “History of Souli and Parga”. This work was written in Corfu in 1801, where he stayed till 1817. Its first volume was published in Greek in 1803 in Paris and includes the earliest historical essay on Souli based on first-hand informations gathered from Souliotes refugees fighters in the island. It also includes information on the activities of Russia, France and Britain in the Ionian and Adriatic during the Napoleonic Wars and the wars against Ali Pasha and the Ottomans. It was translated into Italian by C. Gherardini in 1815 and from Italian to English in 1823.

In 1817, after the departure of French from Corfu, he emigrated to Russia. In Odessa he met the leaders of the Filiki Eteria and became a member of this organization. Following the orders of the Eteria he travelled to the semi-autonomous Mani Peninsula to organize the revolution against the Ottoman Empire. In Wallachia, he met Alexander Ypsilantis, the political and military head of the Greek revolution, in 1820 and tried to persuade him to postpone the uprising. However, Ypsilantis, resolved to begin the revolution in March 1821, sent Perraivos to Epirus to coordinate with the Souliotes and other captains whom he knew from Corfu. He was in Epirus on the outbreak of the revolution (March 1821) and fought with the Souliotes in various battles, as in the siege of the Riniassa castle. After the treaty between Souliotes and Ottomans and the evacuation of Souli, he went to Missolonghi and then to other parts of Greece, participating in many military campaigns and political missions. In 1829, he participated in the Fourth National Assembly at Argos as a representative of Thessaly. After independence, he authored his "War memoirs".

He served in the regular army of the new Greek Kingdom as a lieutenant general, and was promoted to General by King Otto of Greece in 1844.

He died on 4 May 1863 in Athens.

== Works ==
- History of Souli and Parga, Venice, 1815. In Greek.
- “History of Suli and Parga, containing their chronology and their wars …” A. Constable & Company, London, 1823. In English
- War Memoirs of various battles between Greeks and Ottomans in Souli and East Greece from 1820 till 1829. Written by colonel Christoforos Perraivos from Olympus of Thessaly, in two volumes. Athens, 1836. In Greek.
- Short biography of the celebrious Rigas Feraios the Thessalian. Athens, 1860. In Greek.
- Hymn of praise from whole Greece to general-in-chief Bonaparte, Poem by Christofors Perraivos, Corfu, civil year 6 (1798). In Greek. Ύμνος εγκωμιαστικός παρ' όλης της Γραικίας προς τον αρχιστράτηγον Μποναπάρτε, ποίημα Χριστοφόρου Περραιβού. Εν Κερκύρα, χρόνος έκτος πολιτικός (1798).

== Sources ==
- Kordatos G.K., article “Περραιβός” in the "Μεγάλη Ελληνική Εγκυκλοπαίδεια" (Great Greek Encyclopedia), c. 1939, vol. 20, p. 65.
- Boppe Auguste, Le régiment Albanais (1807-1814)
