= Battle of Karpenisi =

1823 Greek-Ottoman military conflict

Coordinates: 39.0560°N 21.5723°E

- Part of the Greek War of Independence
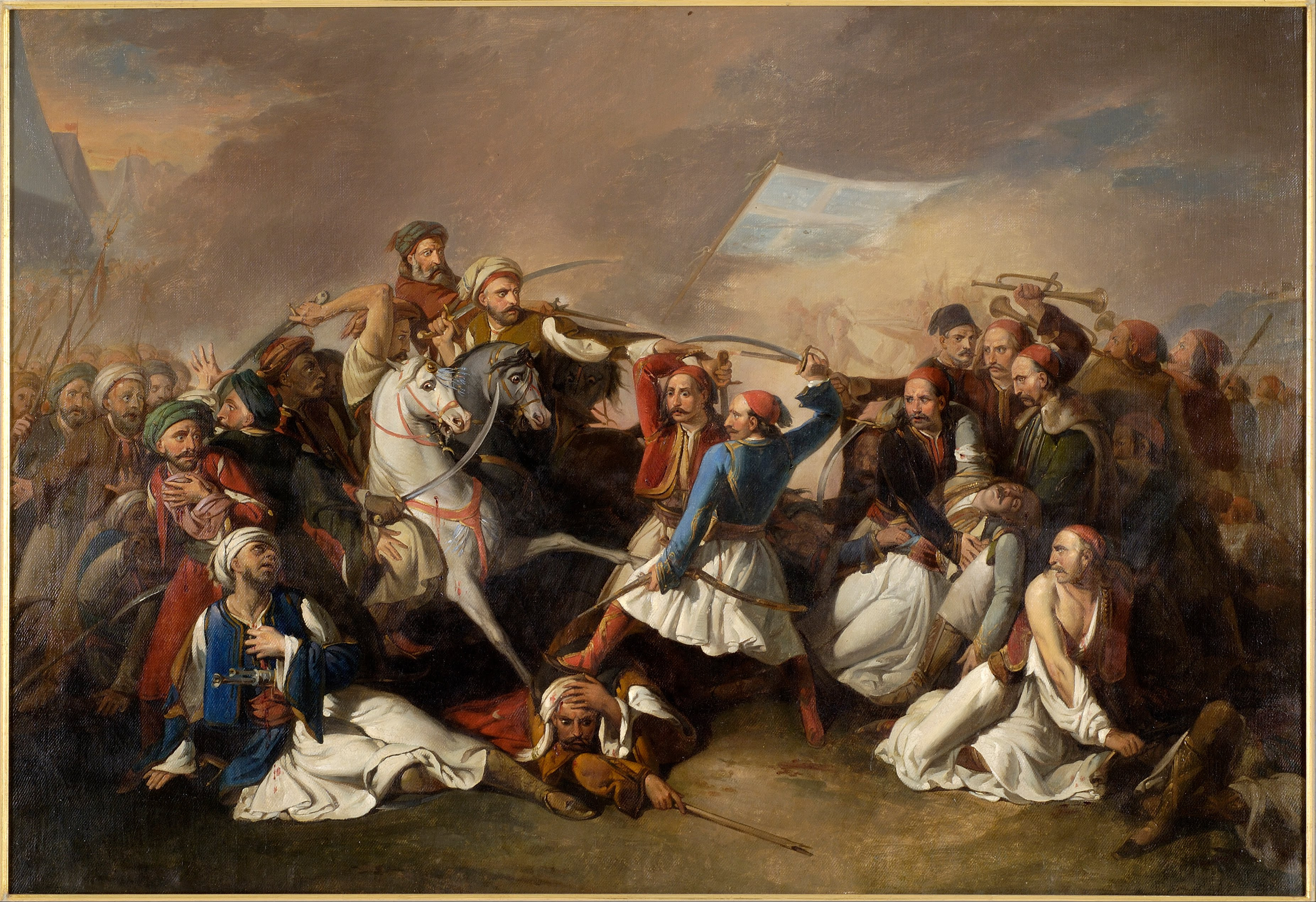
- The death of Markos Botsaris by Marsigli Filippo
Date	21 August 1823
Location	Karpenisi, Sanjak of Inebahti, Ottoman Empire (now Evrytania, Greece)
Result	Inconclusive

Belligerents
(Greece) First Hellenic Republic: Souliote Forces; Other Greek forces	Ottoman Empire: Pashalik of Scutari

Commanders and leaders
Markos Botsaris †	Mustafa Pasha Bushatli; Djelaledin Bey

Strength
1,200	10,000

Casualties and losses
Minimal	~1,000 casualties

The Battle of Karpenisi took place near the town of Karpenisi (in Evrytania, central Greece) on the night of 21 August 1823, between units of the Greek revolutionary army and Ottoman troops.

== Background ==
After the Ottoman failures of 1822, the Sultan Mahmud II devised a plan of invading Greece in 1823. An army was destined to invade Peloponnese not by the eastern side of Central Greece, but by its west side and Patras. The leadership of this expedition was taken over by the Albanian pasha of Shkodër, Mustafa Bushati. Mustafa assembled his army at Ohrid, and it consisted of 10,000 Albanian mercenaries (according to others there were 8,000 or 13,000). During July, the Ottoman forces headed south, but instead of following the direct road, from Ioannina to Missolonghi, they moved diagonally, arrived at Trikala, continued their march through Pindus, and encamped at Karpenisi.

The first resistance against the campaign of Mustafa Pasha was carried out by the Souliote captain Markos Botsaris. The latter moved from Missolonghi to Karpenisi with 350 men. On his way to Karpenisi he persuaded more Greek revolutionaries to follow him, and he eventually managed to muster 1,200 soldiers. His forces, however, were too small to meet Mustafa Pasha’s army in open battle, thus Botsaris convinced the other revolutionaries to assault their opponents’ camp during nighttime. Two days prior to the Greek assault, a unit of spies was sent by Botsaris, which infiltrated and scouted their enemies' positions without being noticed.

== Battle ==
At midnight of 21 August 1823, Markos Botsaris assaulted the Ottoman camp, believing surprise would secure their victory over Mustafa's larger army. Botsaris' men, even though they were eventually not supported by the majority of the Greek revolutionaries, managed to cause panic in the Ottoman camp, and inflicted severe casualties. Botsaris himself was wounded in his abdomen, but he continued on guiding his forces. Later, Botsaris raised his head above a walled enclosure in which many of his enemies were fortified, but he was shot dead. His men hid his death and continued the battle until dawn. The revolutionaries eventually retreated without stopping Mustafa Pasha’s expedition, but they looted nearly 700 pistols, 1,000 muskets and a large amount of horses, mules, and sheep. The army of Mustafa had lost 1,000 men while the Greeks had minimal casualties.

Botsaris’s corpse was transferred to Missolonghi, where he was buried with great honors. After the battle of Karpenisi, the Ottoman Albanian forces moved against Missolonghi and besieged it. However, they were finally defeated, and Mustafa Pasha retreated to Albania during December 1823.

== See also ==
- Kostas Botsaris
- Markos Botsaris
- Second Siege of Missolonghi

== Sources ==
- Paroulakis, Peter Harold. The Greeks: Their Struggle for Independence. Hellenic International Press, 1984. ISBN 0-9590894-0-3.
