= Souli =

Municipality in Epirus, Greece

Souli Σούλι
- Municipality
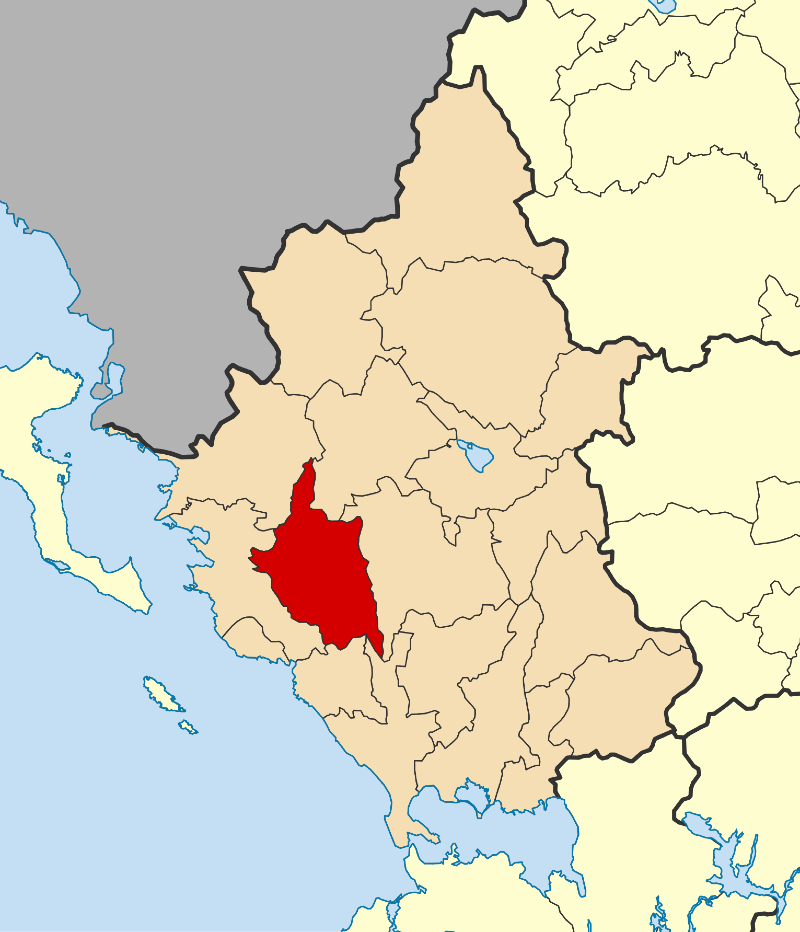

- Location within Greece
- Coordinates: 39°22′N 20°38′E
- Country: Greece
- Administrative region: Epirus
- Regional unit: Thesprotia
- Seat: Paramythia

Area
  - Municipality: 502.8 km^{2} (194.1 sq mi)
  - Municipal unit: 93.2 km^{2} (36.0 sq mi)

Population (2021)
  - Municipality: 8,759
  - Density: 17.42/km^{2} (45.12/sq mi)
  - Municipal unit: 349
  - Municipal unit density: 3.74/km^{2} (9.70/sq mi)
- Time zone: UTC+2 (EET)
  - Summer (DST): UTC+3 (EEST)

Souli (Greek: Σούλι) is a municipality in Epirus, northwestern Greece. The seat of the municipality is the town of Paramythia.

== Name ==
The origin of the name Souli is uncertain. In the earliest historical text about Souli, written by Christoforos Perraivos in 1803, an oral tradition of the locals is recorded. According to this, the first settlers of Souli were shepherds who came from a village called Gardiki trying to avoid the Ottoman oppression. A certain Muslim ("Turk" in the text) named Soulis attempted to expel the early Souliotes from there but the latter resisted with arms. In the battle they killed Soulis and since then the area was named Souli. However, Fourikis (1934) goes as far as proposing that Perraivos invented this explanation himself. The most commonly accepted theory in contemporary historiography, as suggested by Fourikis (1934), states that Souli derives from the Albanian term sul, which means "mountain peak", while it may also be interpreted as "watchpost, lookout, mountain summit".

== History ==
The municipality owes its name to the villages of Souli that are located in the southern part of this region. Those villages were originally settled by the Souliotes, a warlike community who sought refuge in the mountainous terrain from the Ottomans. Those villages in the early 19th century had a population of c. 12,000. After their expulsion, the population of the region was significantly reduced. In the 18th and 19th century, the citizens of Souli rebelled against the Ottoman rule. It was noted that in 1972 that there was still an Albanian minority in Souli.

Today, many Souliote villages, churches, and fortifications are left partially abandoned due to immigration to other countries, as well as moving to larger towns like Paramythia. Some examples of partly abandoned or sparsely populated villages are Koukoulii (sometimes referred to as Kouklious), Zotiko, and Tsaggario to a lesser extent. The Kiafa castle, constructed by Ali Pasha of the Ottoman Empire in order to hide his treasure and money, is completely abandoned and in ruin.

== Municipality ==
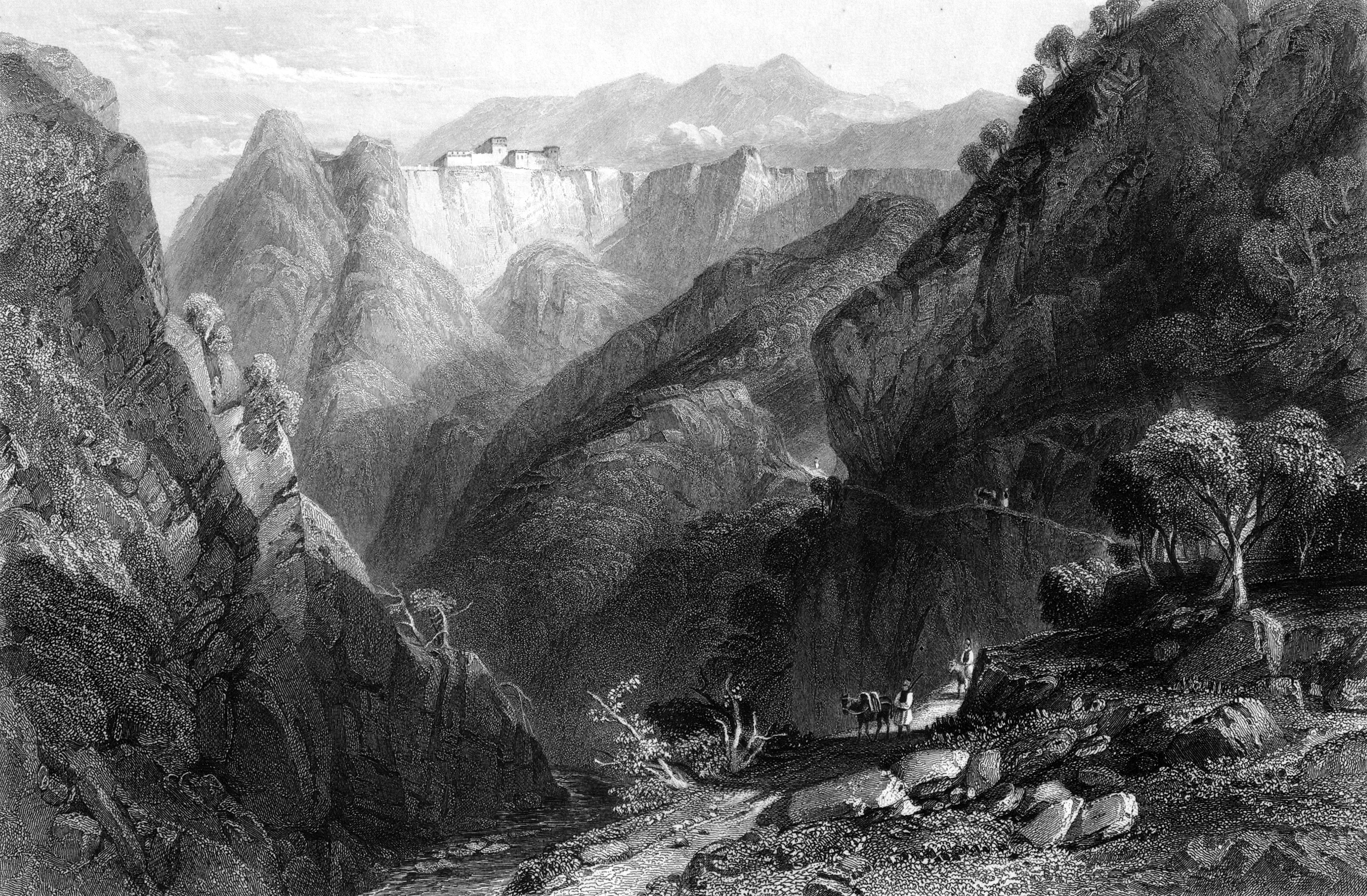
Souli, 1836

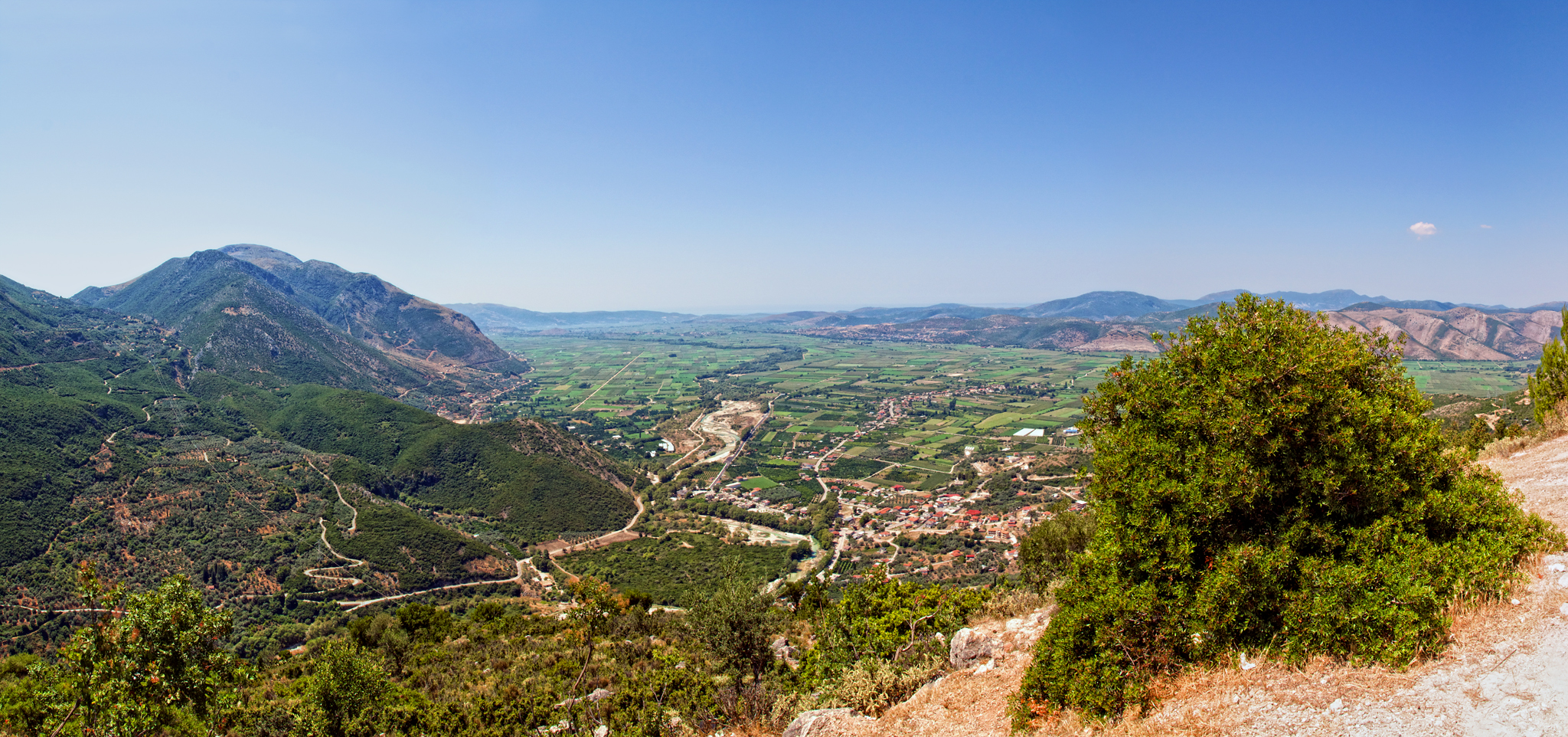
Valley of the Acheron viewed from the mountains of Souli

The present municipality of Souli was formed in the 2011 local government reform by the merger of the following 3 former municipalities, which became municipal units:

- Acherontas
- Paramythia
- Souli

The municipality has an area of 502.8 km^{2}, and the municipal unit 93.2 km^{2}.

== Province ==
The province of Souli (Greek: Επαρχία Σουλίου) was one of the provinces of Thesprotia. It had the same territory as the present municipality. It was abolished in 2006.
