= Bašić =

- Pronunciation: Serbo-Croatian: [bâʃitɕ]

Origin
- Meaning: chief
- Region of origin: Bosnia and Herzegovina, Croatia, Montenegro, Serbia, Slovenia

Other names
- Variant forms: Bassich, Bashich, Basic, Baschich, Baschitsch

Bašić is a South Slavic surname.

It is assumed that it derived from the word baša, meaning 'chief', itself a loanword from Turkish başı, meaning 'head'. Its literal meaning is 'little chief'.

It is one of the most common surnames in two Dalmatian counties of Croatia.

== Family crest ==
The first family crest can be described by the following text.

"In a blue background on a green ground, a warrior dressed in red with high black boots and a hat, left-handed sideways with gold with a belt to which black covers are fastened. In his raised right he holds a scimitar with a golden cross opposite the neck of a kneeling bearded Turk dressed in a rainbow white kaftan with a belt, which with raised hands begs for mercy."

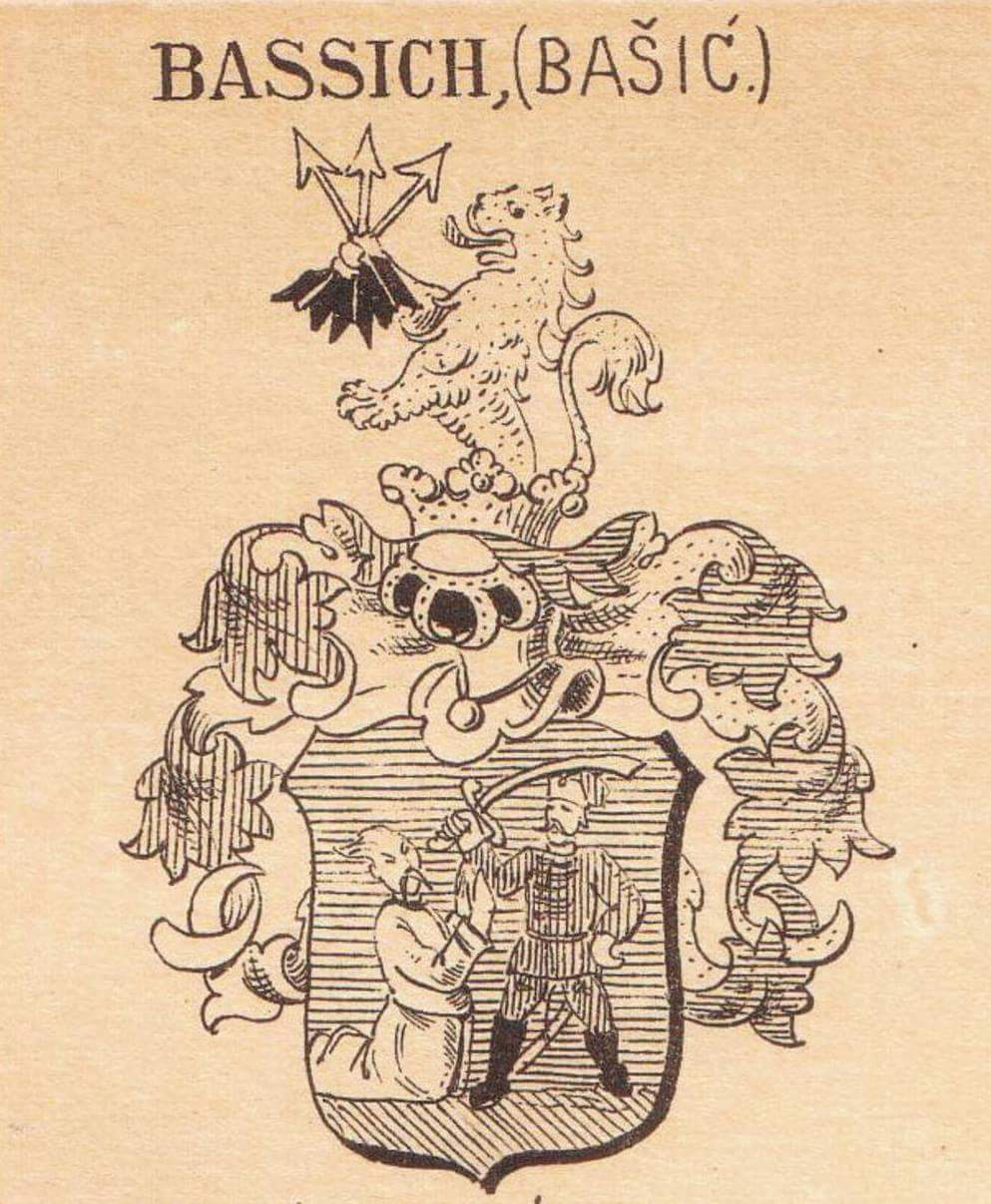
One of Bašić family crests from Croatia.

This description from the book is describing the conflicts that the Bassich family of Austria had against the Turks while defending Vienna.

The second family crest can be described by the following text.

"In a red background on a green ground, a leopard standing upright on its hind legs sideways. In its raised right paw it holds a silver dagger, and in its lower left paw it holds a golden crescent moon. Above the shield sits a silver helmet with a golden crown, from which rise two curved golden horns flanking a six-pointed golden star, flanked on the left by red and silver mantling and on the right by blue and gold mantling."

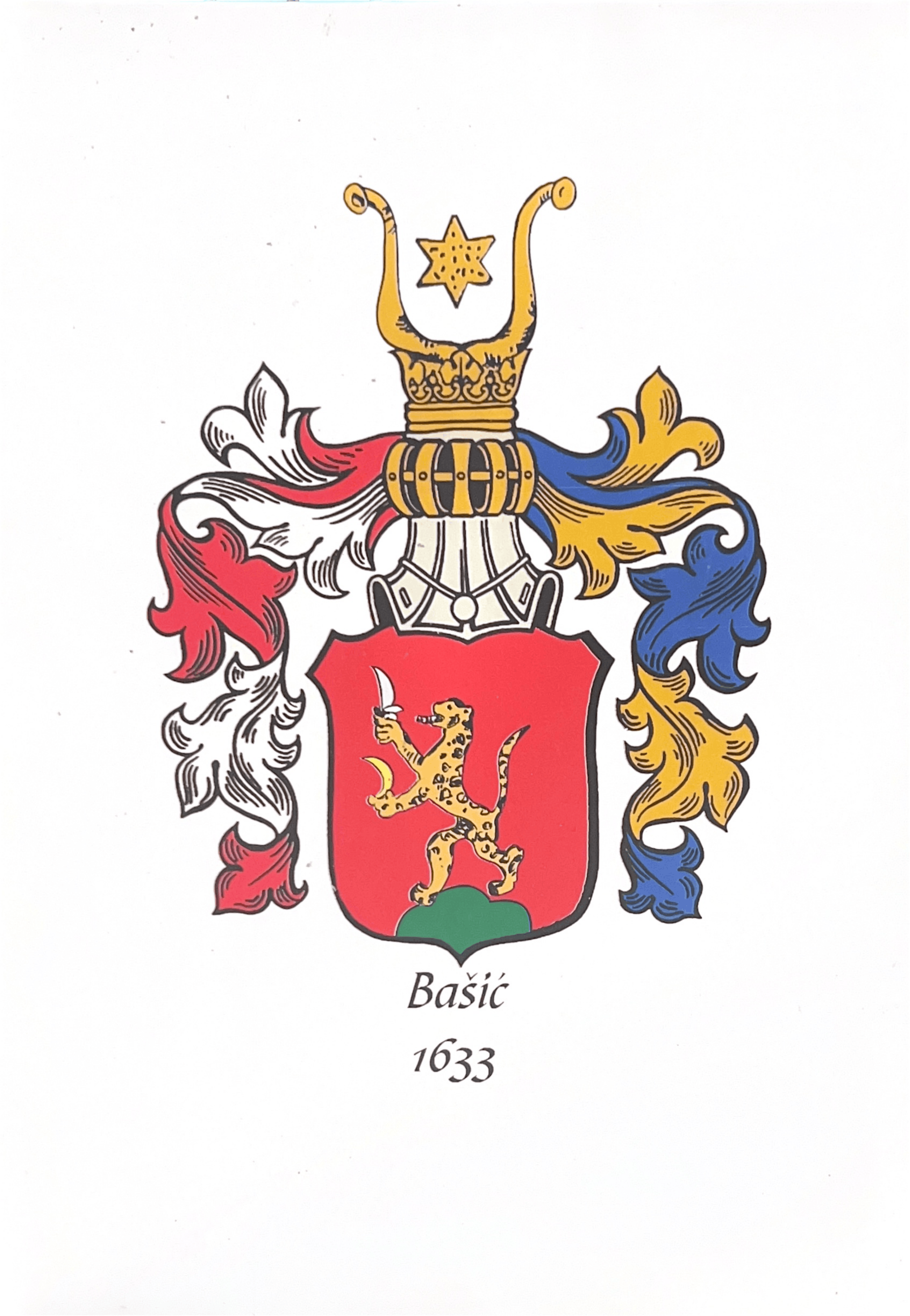
Another of Bašić family crests from Croatia.

== Notable people ==
=== Film and theater ===
==== Actors/Actresses ====
- Ivana Bašić (born 1976), Croatian actress
- Relja Bašić (1930–2017), Croatian actor
- Senad Bašić (born 1962), Bosnia and Herzegovina actor

=== Architects ===
- Nikola Bašić, Croatian architect

=== Arts ===
- Ivana Bašić (born 1986), Serbian artist

=== Music ===
==== Classical ====
- Elly Bašić (1908–1998), Croatian music teacher
- Jasmin Bašić (born 1971), Bosnian tenor
- Mladen Bašić (1917–2012), Croatian conductor

==== Folklore ====
- Vlado Bašić, Croatian singer

=== Science ===
- Nino Bašić, mathematician

=== Sports ===
- Andrija Bašić (born 1995), water polo player
- Alen Bašić (born 1980), football player
- Edin Bašić (born 1979), handball player
- Ivan Bašić (born 2002), football player
- Karlo Bašić (1911–2000), sailor
- Josip Bašić (born 1996), football player
- Lovre Bašić (born 1995), basketball player
- Luka Bašič (born 1989), ice hockey player
- Marko Bašić (footballer, born 1984)
- Marko Bašić (footballer, born 1988)
- Mirko Bašić (born 1960), handball player
- Mirza Bašić (born 1991), tennis player
- Nermin Bašić (born 1983), football manager
- Sonja Bašić (born 1987), handball player
- Toma Bašić (born 1996), football player
- Tomislav Bašić (born 1980), football player
- Tomislav Bašić (born 1975), sailor
- Tonči Bašić (born 1974), football player
- Zlatko Bašić (born 1975), football player and coach

=== Politics ===
- Đorđe Bašić (1946–2007), Serbian politician

=== Other ===
- Azra Bašić (née Alešević, born 1959), camp guard during Bosnian War

== See also ==
- Buljubašić
- Delibašić
- Harambašić
- Mehmedbašić
