= Souliotes =

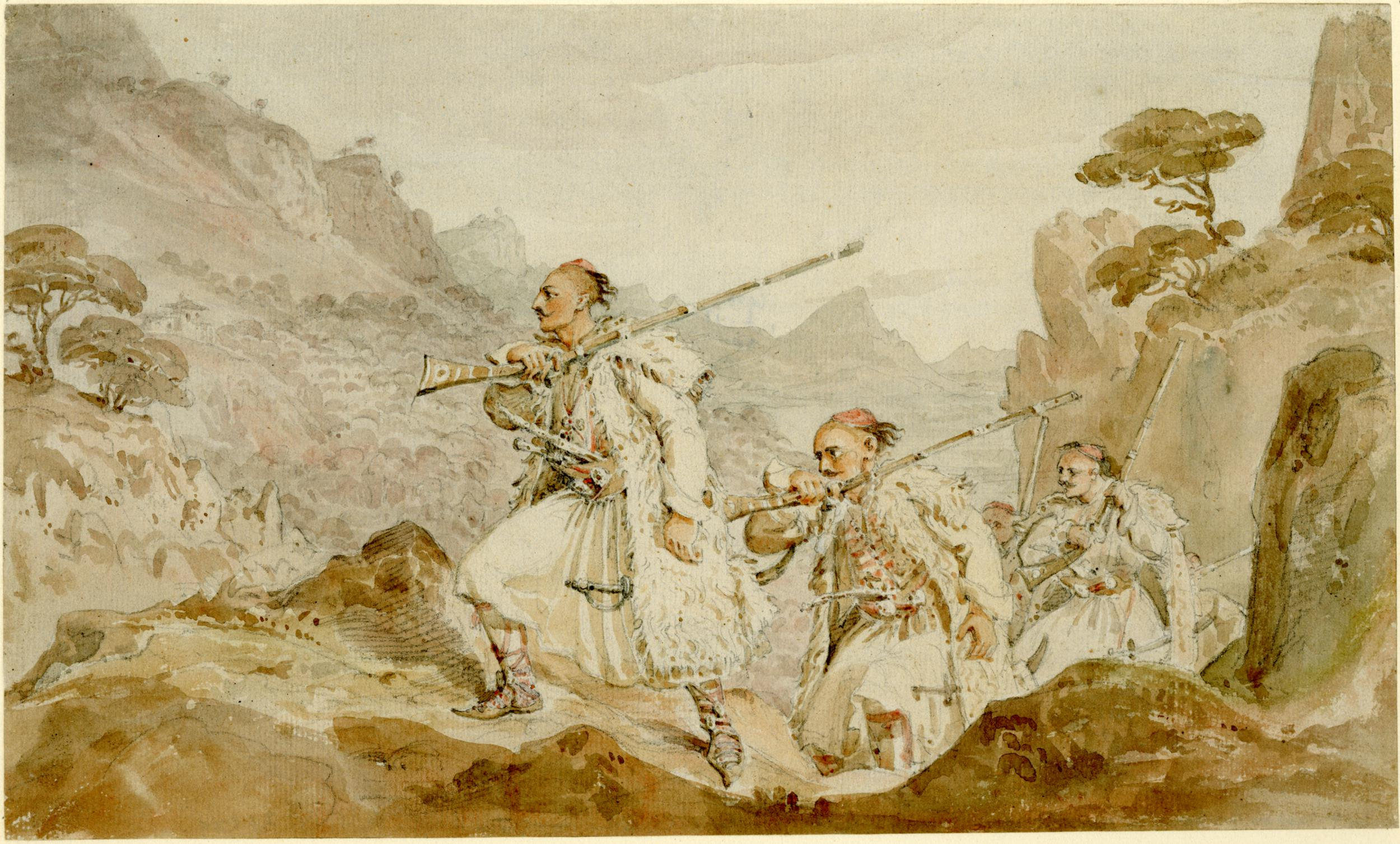
- Souliot warriors in a watercolour by Charles Robert Cockerell entitled Albanian palikars in pursuit of an enemy (1813–1814)

Total population
- c. 4,500 (1803, est.)

Regions with significant populations
- Souli
- Tetrachori: c. 3,250
- Eptachori: up to 1,250

Languages
- Albanian; Greek (from the 18th century onwards)

Religion
- Orthodox Christianity

The Souliotes were an Orthodox Christian Albanian tribal community in the area of Souli in Epirus from the 16th century to the beginning of the 19th century, who via their participation in the Greek War of Independence came to identify with the Greek nation.

They originated from Albanian clans that settled in the highlands of Thesprotia in the Late Middle Ages and established an autonomous confederation dominating a large number of neighbouring villages in the mountainous areas of Epirus, where they successfully resisted Ottoman rule for many years. At the height of its power, in the second half of the 18th century, the Souliote confederacy is estimated to have consisted of up to 4,500 inhabitants. After the revolution, they migrated to and settled in newly independent Greece, and assimilated into the Greek people. The Souliotes were followers of the Ecumenical Patriarchate of Constantinople and members of the Rum millet. They spoke the Souliotic dialect of Albanian language and learnt Greek through their interaction with Greek-speakers. They are known for their military prowess, their initial resistance to the Ottoman Albanian ruler Ali Pasha and final trusted alliance with him when he rebelled against the Ottoman Porte in the failed attempt to create an independent state, and later for their contribution to the Greek cause in the revolutionary war against the Ottoman Empire under leaders such as Markos Botsaris and Kitsos Tzavelas.

The first historical account of rebellious activity in Souli dates from 1685. During the 18th century, the Souliotes expanded their territory of influence. As soon as Ali Pasha became the local Ottoman ruler in 1789 he immediately launched successive expeditions against Souli. However, the numerical superiority of his troops was not enough. The siege against Souli was intensified from 1800 and in December 1803 the Souliotes concluded an armistice and agreed to abandon their homeland. Most of them were exiled in the Ionian Islands. On 4 December 1820, Ali Pasha constituted an anti-Ottoman coalition joined by the Souliotes, to which they contributed with 3,000 soldiers, mainly because he offered to allow the return of the Souliotes to their land, and partly by appeal to their shared Albanian origins. After the defeat of Ali Pasha and with the outbreak of the Greek War of Independence, the Souliotes were among the first communities to take arms against the Ottomans. Following the successful struggle for independence, they settled in parts of the newly established Greek state and assimilated into the Greek nation, with many attaining high posts in the Greek government, including that of Prime Minister. Members of the Souliote diaspora participated in the national struggles for the incorporation of Souli to Greece, such as in the revolt of 1854 and the Balkan Wars (1912–1913) with Ottoman rule ending in 1913.

== Geography ==
=== Name ===
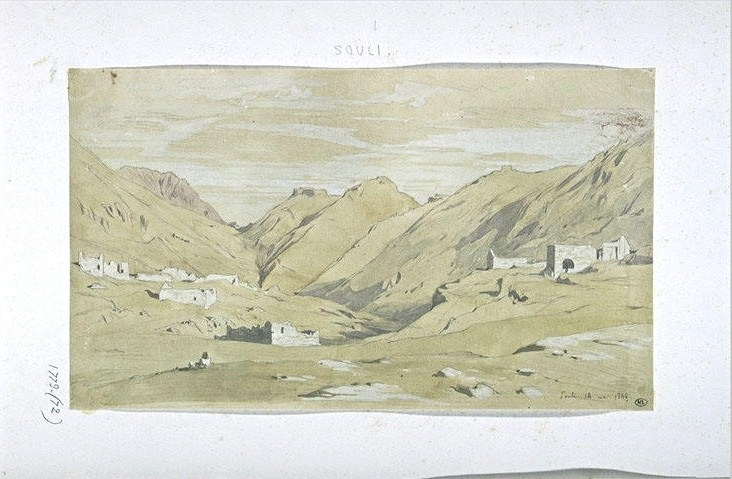
A painting of Souli.

The Souliotes (Albanian: Suljotë; Greek: Σουλιώτες) were named after the village of Souli (Greek: Σούλι, Albanian: Suli), a hilltop settlement in modern Thesprotia, Greece. Souli gradually became the name of the entire region where the four main Souliot settlements are located (Souli, Avariko, Kiafa, Samoniva). Souli as a region is not attested in any sources before the 18th century. François Pouqueville, the French traveler, historian and consul in Ioannina, and others in his era theorized that the area was the ancient Greek Selaida and its modern inhabitants descendants of the Selloi, an ancient Greek tribe that inhabited the region in antiquity. This hypothesis was fueled and proposed in the context of the rise of romanticism in Europe and the ideological return to the ancient past. Such views had little acceptance in historiography and were already rejected as early as the publication of the History of Souli (1815) by Christoforos Perraivos.

The origin of the toponym Souli is uncertain. Perraivos attributed the name to an Ottoman official in the region who was killed in a battle against the Souliotes, who gave his name to their village. In contemporary historiography, this theory is considered to be a constitutive myth designed to link the name of Souli with the narrative of struggles of its inhabitants against Ottoman officials. Historically, this view has been rejected as it would imply that the Souliotes had no name for their main village and region before the killing of a single Ottoman official. Fourikis (1934) goes as far as proposing that Perraivos invented this explanation himself. At the end of the 19th century Labridis proposed that Souli may derive from one of the earliest Cham Albanian clan leaders who settled in the area and gave his name to it as was the habit in tribal settlements. Fourikis (1934) rejected an origin of the toponym from a personal name and proposed that it simply derived from the Albanian word sul (mountain peak) which is found as a geographical toponym in other areas where medieval Albanian clans settled. It may also be interpreted as 'watchpost', 'lookout', or 'mountain summit'. The view of Fourikis is the most commonly accepted theory in contemporary historiography. Psimouli (2006) considers the etymological aspects in the theory of Fourikis acceptable, but rejects the view the toponym Souli emerged from the region's geomorphology, because none of the four settlements of the tetrachori is placed on a mountaintop or an outlook but at an altitude of no more than 600 m. The author notes that while the mountain peaks which surround Souli have Albanian toponyms, none of them was actually named sul by the clans which settled there. Hence, Psimouli (2006) proposes that "Souli" or "Siouli" refers to a personal name -the first name or cognomen of the progenitor of the Albanian immigrant group that settled there - as happened in other settlements like Spata or the neighbouring Mazaraki or Mazarakia. The name itself metaphorically may have referred to his height as a tall person.

=== Settlements ===
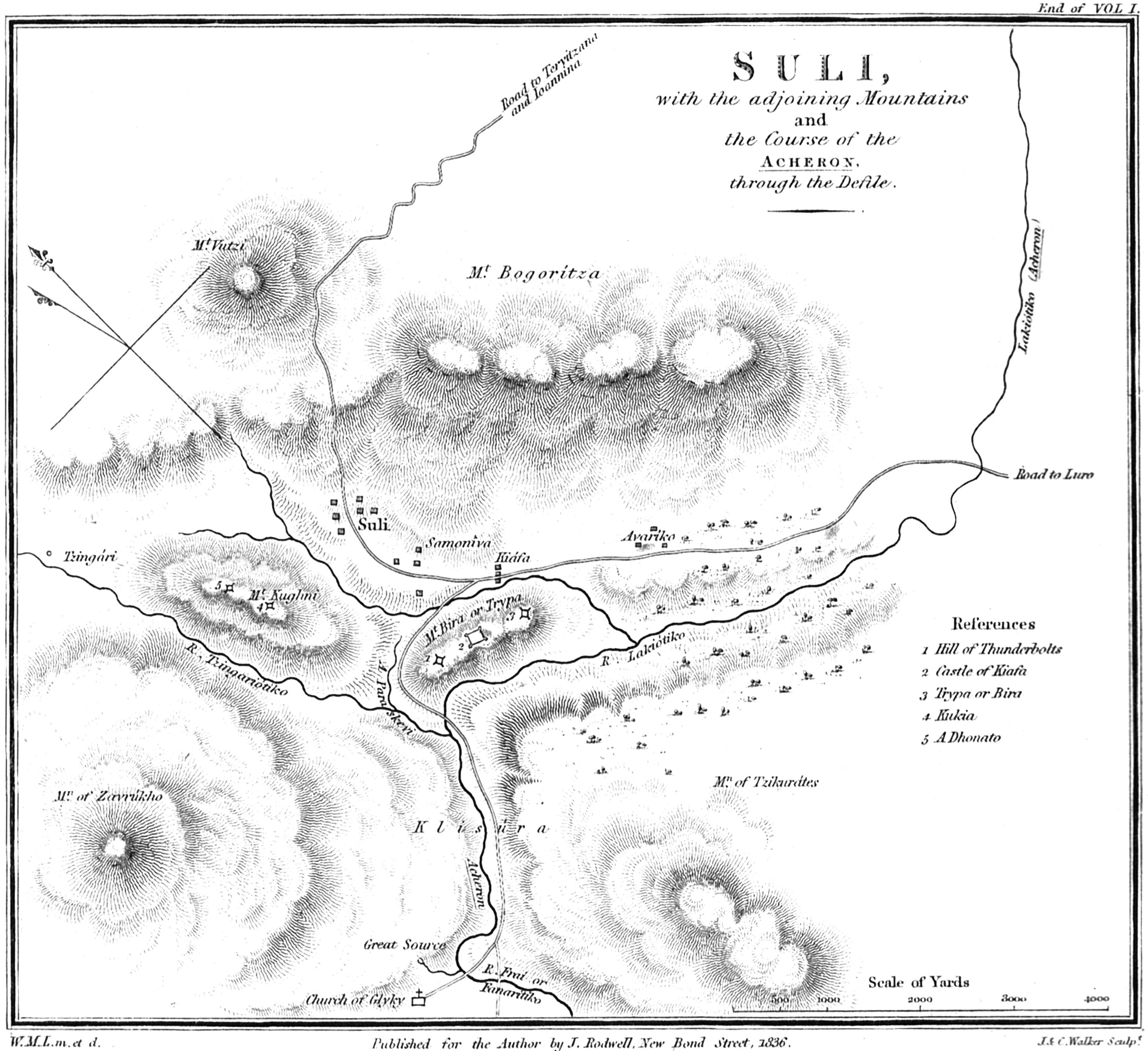
Map of Souli by William Martin Leake (1835)

The core of Souli consisted of four villages (Greek: Τετραχώρι), namely: Souli (also known as Kakosouli), Avariko (also known as Navariko), Kiafa and Samoniva. In time the confederation expanded and included additional seven villages (Greek: Επταχώρι). The latter became the outer defensive ring in case of an attack. Both groups of villages were also collectively called Souli. At the peak of their power, in 1800, Souliot leaders estimated that their community numbered c. 20,000 inhabitants. Vasso Psimouli estimates a total population of c. 4,500 for the Souliot villages. Of these, she estimates that up to 1,250 were living in the "eptachori", among whom 500 were armed, according to Perraivos, organized in 18 clans, while the other 3,250, in 31 clans, were living in the "tetrachori" and provided c. 1200 armed men.

Several surrounding villages, c. 50–66, which became part of the Souliote confederation were known as Parasouli. Parasouliotes could join the Souliotes to armed operations but they had no representation in the Souliote government. In case they displayed distinction in warfare they received permission to settle in Souliote villages and enjoyed the same rights and duties as the Souliotes.

== Early history ==
Most scholars agree that the first inhabitants of Souli settled there in the middle of the 16th century as groups of shepherds. The earliest inhabitants came from southern Albania and the plains of Thesprotia. Vasso Psimouli holds that Souli was chosen as a place of permanent settlement by a subgroup of one of the two Albanian immigrant pastoralist populations that arrived in the area organized in large kinship groups (Albanian: fis) in the mid-14th century, a time of power vacuum after the death of Stefan Dušan and demographic decline of the Greek agrarian population due to the plague. One Albanian immigrant group, that of the Mazreku, could reach the area from the north through Vagenetia, while the other from the south via Rogoi. Authors who traveled in the region in the late 18th and early 19th centuries argue that the initial core of clans which formed the Souliotes gradually grew and expanded in other settlements. George Finlay recorded that "the Chams reserve the name Suliote for 100 families who, by virtue of birth, belonged to the military caste of Suli". According to Finlay, this population increased from other immigrant clans which joined them. Modern sources argue that the gradual settlement of families and tribes of different origins in Souli unlikely, because of the lack of sources testifying the abandonment of villages in the 17th century and also due to the limited ability of the pastures of Souli to maintain superfluous population and to the closed character of tribal organization, which is not open to accepting outsiders in mass.

The Souliote population was located in inland Thesprotia and for much of the 16th century remained away from the plagues and military events which affected coastal Epirus. This was an era of demographic increase for the area. The Souliote clans were pastoralist communities. Demographic pressure, environmental conditions and lack of grazing grounds gradually created social conditions, which led many Souliote clans to engage in pillaging and raiding other Souliote clans and primarily the neighbouring, lowland peasant communities as a means to combat lack of means of subsistence. In the 18th century, the occasional use of raiding as a means of subsistence became an institutionalized activity of Souliote clans which systematically raided the lowland peasants. The price of weapons in the 17th century had decreased which made their acquirement much easier and the naturally defensive position of Souliote clans in their hilltop settlements made immediate intervention by the Ottoman authorities difficult.

== Society ==
=== Patrilineal clans ===
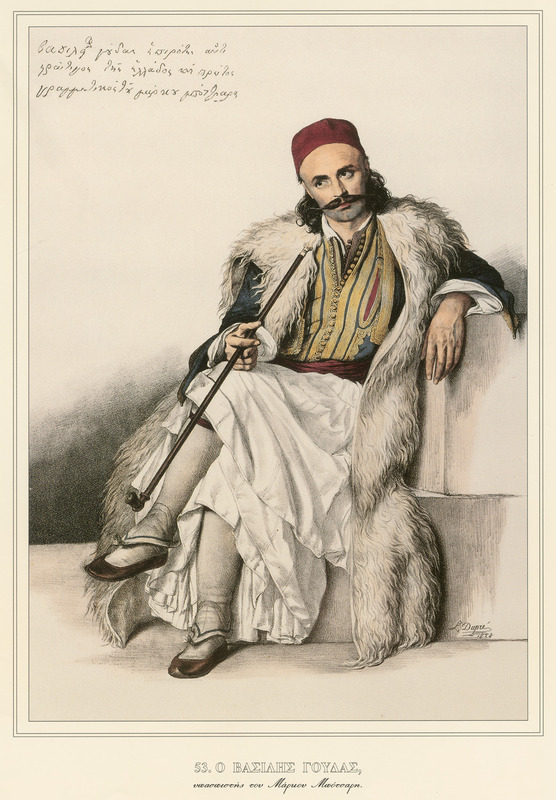
Vasilis Goudas, deputy to Markos Botsaris, by Louis Dupré

The Souliotes were organized in patrilineal clans which they called in Albanian farë (def. fara, pl. farat "tribe"). Membership in the fara was exclusively decided via patrilineality. Indicative of this condition is the translation of M. Botsaris of the Greek term genos which is the exact equivalent to fara as gjish which in Albanian means grandfather. Each fara was formed by the descendants of a common patrilineal progenitor whose personal name became the clan name of the entire fara. It was led by a single clan leader who was its representative, although this practice was under constant negotiation as a leader may not have been acceptable by all members of the fara. Each clan was further divided in brotherhoods. As such, in time, it had the tendency to branch out in new clans which were formed as the original one grew in size and could no longer hold its cohesion as one unit under one leader. Members of the fara enjoyed privileges of settlement in specific villages and had the right to use in common specific natural resources (water springs, grazing grounds) which had been assigned to it.

All heads of clans gathered in the general assembly which Lambros Koutsonikas (himself a Souliot) recorded in Greek as Πλεκεσία, a term that can be linked to the Albanian pleqësia (council of elders). This acted as the highest political structure of Souliot society which was responsible for solving disputes, formulating tribal laws, arbitrage between clans in dispute and the enforcement of decisions of the council against members of the community. It was a space where the different fara of Souliot society negotiated with each other their position in Souliotic society. The assembly was held in the open courtyard next to the church of St. George in Souli. The decisions of the pleqësia were not written down but agreed upon via the oral pledge of besë (def. besa) to which all heads of clans were bound. The concept of besa was the foundation for agreements not only within Souliot society but functioned as the basis for any agreements which Souliotes made with outsiders, including hostile forces in times of war. The significance of this concept is highlighted by the fact that M. Botsaris translates besë in Greek as threskeia (religion) and i pabesë ("without besë) as apistos (unbeliever). As each clan acted autonomously of the general assembly of their leaders, they could sign agreements with outsiders which contradicted the agreements which the Souliot community signed as a whole and this was a common cause of friction among the Souliot clans.

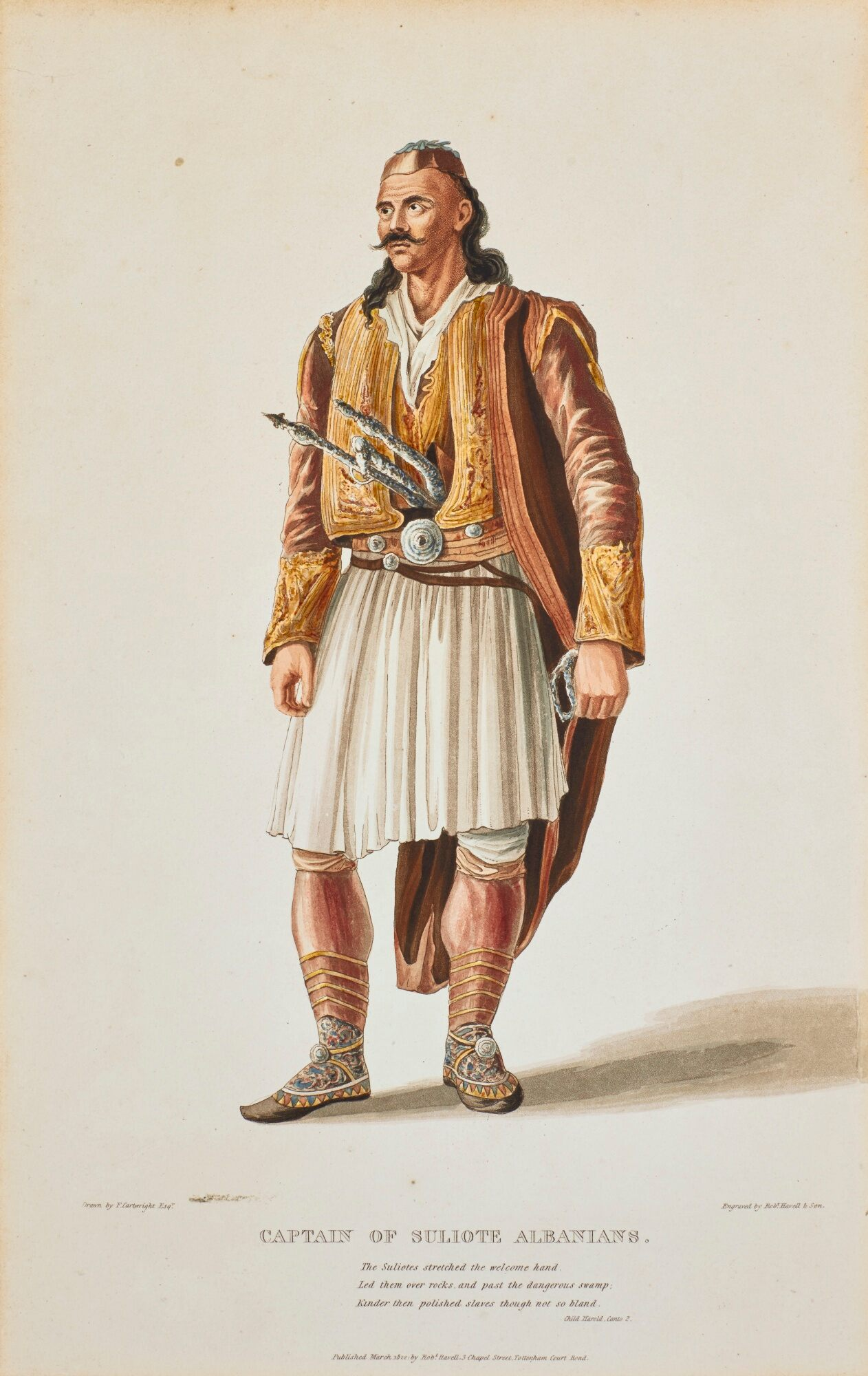
Captain of Suliote Albanians by Joseph Cartwright, published in March 1822.

A detailed recording of the Souliot clans appears for the first time by Perraivos. According to his notes, at the end of the 18th century, 450 families which belonged to 26 clans lived in the village of Souli. In Kiafa, there were 90 families which belonged to four clans. In Avariko, five families which belonged to three clans and in Samoniva 50 families which belonged to three clans. As the Souliot population, new clans were established from existing ones and formed the population of the seven villages around core Souli. There was an informal hierarchy among Souliot clans in the second half of the 18th century which was determined by the fighting power (men) of each fara and its size. The Botsaris clan was one of the oldest and most powerful in all four villages of core Souli. Georgios Botsaris in 1789 claimed that his clan could field 1,000 men against Ali Pasha followed by the Tzavellas and Zervas clans each of which could field 300 men and other smaller clans with 100 men each. George Botsaris presented himself as "the most respected individual among the Souliots" and his son Dimitris presented his father as the captain of the Souliots and himself as the commissioner of the Albanians (in Greek, ton Arvaniton epitropikos). It is evident that in this period of Souliot history, social stratification among the clans had created an environment which led weaker clans to coalesce around stronger ones and be represented by them. The role, however, of the pleqësia was to stop such differentiation and maintain relations of equality in the community. Until the fall of Souli in 1803, the Souliot community never accepted to have a single leader from one clan and even in times of war each clan chose its leader from its own ranks. Thus, the Souliot tribal organization remained one which preserved the collective autonomy of each clan until its end. Social stratification was expressed since the second half of the 18th century in social practices of the Souliots, but was never institutionalized.

Main Souliot clans at the end of the 18th century
Name in Albanian	Name in Greek	Settlement
Boçari	Botsaris	Souli (Sul)
Xhavella	Tzavellas	Souli
Kuçonika	Koutsonikas	Souli
Dhrako	Drakos	Souli
Danglli	Danglis	Souli, Samoniva
Buca	Boutzias	Souli
Sheho	Seos	Souli
Zharba	Zarbas	Souli
Vello	Velios	Souli
Kallojeri	Kalogeros	Souli
Thanasi	Thanasis	Souli
Kashkari	Kaskaris	Souli
Dora	Toras	Souli
Vaso	Vasos	Souli
Papajani	Papagiannis	Souli
Todi	Todis	Souli
Shahini	Sachinis	Souli
Manxho	Mantzos	Souli
Pallama	Palamas	Souli
Buzbu	Bousbos	Souli
Mati	Matis	Souli
Zerva	Zervas	Kiafa (Qafa)
Nika	Nikas	Kiafa
Foto	Fotos	Kiafa
Pandaziu	Pandazis	Kiafa
Sallatari	Salataris	Avariko (Navarik)
Bufi	Boufis	Avariko
Xhori	Tzoris	Avariko
Beka	Bekas	Samoniva
Hërra	Iras	Samoniva

The Souliotes wore red skull caps, fleecy capotes over their shoulders, embroidered jackets, scarlet buskins, slippers with pointed toes and white kilts.

=== Economy ===
In the mid-sixteenth century Souli is listed in an Ottoman tax register as a village inhabited by 244 taxpayers, located in the Christian nahiye of Ai-Donat, part of the homonymous kaza of the sanjak of Delvina. In a 1613 tax list, however, Souli is one of the settlements in which some taxpayers paid resm-i çift and resm-i bennak, taxes paid by Muslim subjects, newcomers or converts to Islam.

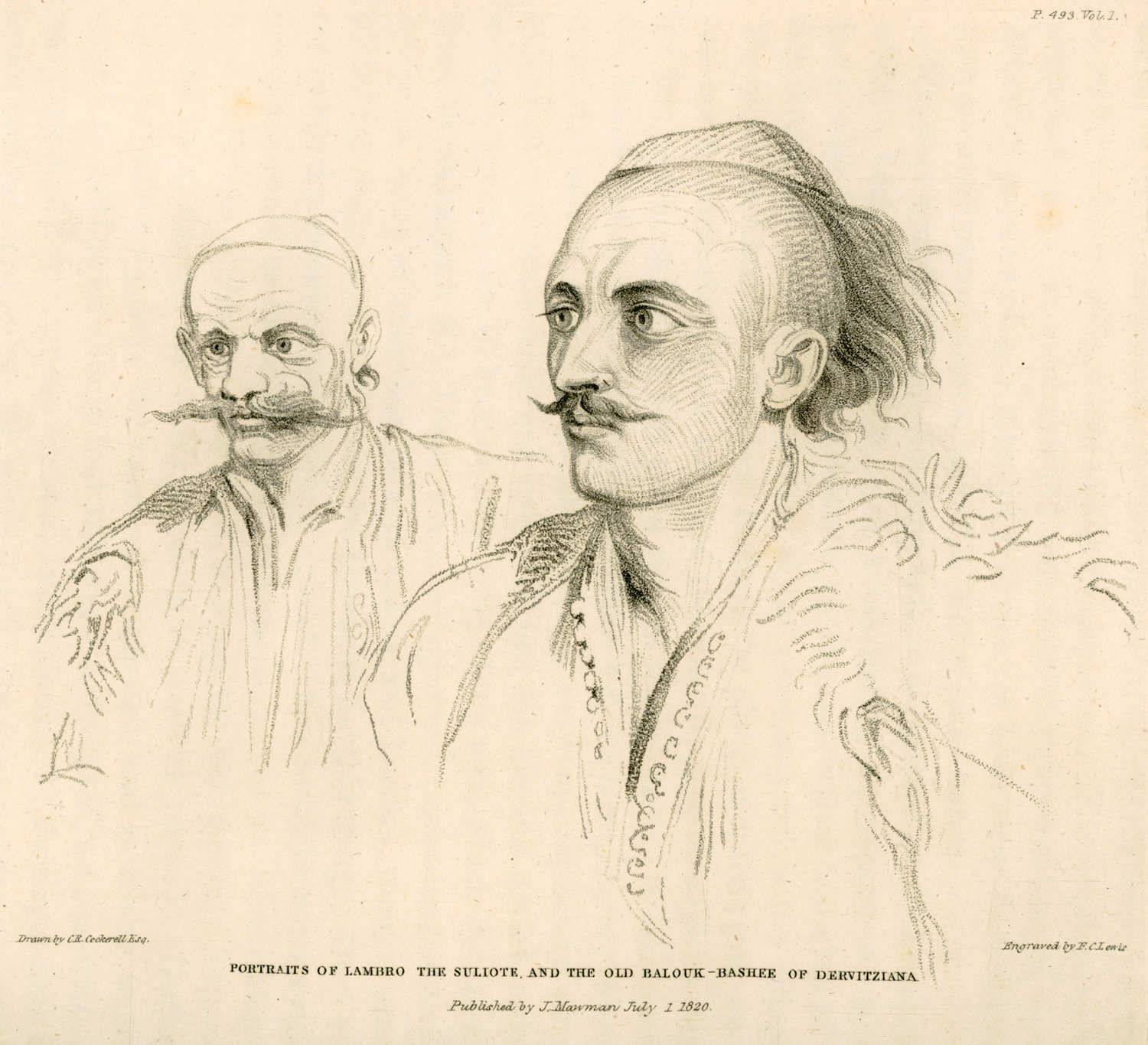
Portraits of Lambro the Suliote and the old Balouk-Bashee of Dervitziana (Thomas Smart Hughes, 1820).

The Souliots were subject to a sipahi, who had a degree of jurisdiction in Souli, represented them, as testified in a 1794 document, and collected a small amount of tax. The incorporation of the Souliots in the timariot system through the payment of taxes certified their legal standing, guaranteed them representation through the sipahi and allowed the continuation of their control and enrichment through activities such as brigandage and the provision of protection to subjugated populations. Perraivos records that the "sipahi of Soli", Beqir Bey, was settled in Yannina and went to Souli once every year to collect taxes.

Taxation archives show that the economy of the Souliotes was based on small-scale subsistence pastoralism which due to few available grazing grounds never increased enough to become a source of commercial activity. The spahis of Souli generated little profit from their position. It seems that no Ottoman official or timariot holder of Souli lived there. This likely happened not because of Souliot hostility but because of the extended practice of Ottoman officials since the 17th century to not live on the territories they were assigned to, but in the closest large urban settlement. All archival sources show that throughout its existence the Souliotic community paid its taxes regularly and complied with Ottoman economic laws in their transactions and as such was represented in the Ottoman system, but it was not integrally included in it as its remote position and lack of natural resources didn't lead to any Ottoman presence within Souli. As a result, Psimouli (2016) describes the status of Souli as a "community without Turkish presence, but not necessarily autonomous".

=== Blood vengeance ===
Blood vengeance was one of the core social practices in Souliot society. It regulated relations between clans, the social hierarchy of Souli and the attribution of customary justice in cases of violations of clan property. Blood vengeance was ideologically linked with the concepts of honour-dishonour which was a collective trait of the entire clan. The pervasiveness of blood vengeance in Souliot society is highlighted in Souli's architecture: all houses were essentially fortified towers which were placed in strategic positions which could be defended from attacks which started from other fortified towers of Souli and even the churches had embrasures. M. Botsaris uses the terms hasm (enemy) and hak which literally means vengeance in Albanian as the equivalent of Greek dikaiosyne (justice). The term linked to the actual practice of blood vengeance which he uses is gjak (Gjakmarrja).

=== Language ===
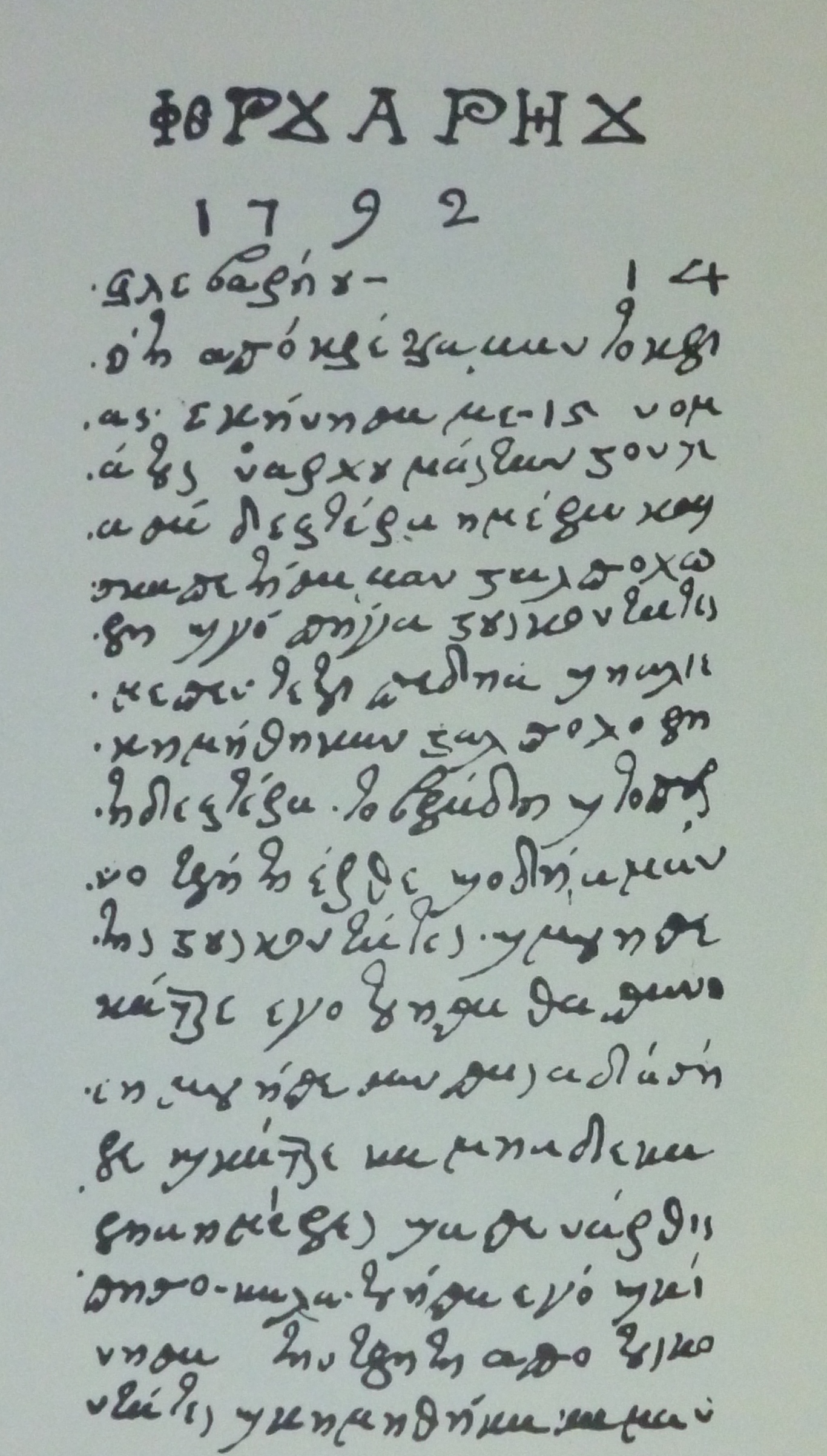
A page of the diary of Fotos Tzavellas, written in Greek. Header: ΦΕ[Β]ΡΟΥΑΡΙΟΥ (February) 1792

The Souliots spoke Albanian, being the descendants of an Albanian pastoral group that had settled in the area, while, due to their communication and exchanges with the mostly Greek-speaking population of surrounding areas and the importance of their economic and military presence during the eighteenth century, learnt to use also Greek. For the social use of each language, William Martin Leake writes that "Souliot men spoke Albanian at home and all men could speak Greek as they were their neighbours, while many women could speak Greek too". For the movements of Souliots to the villages of Lakka Souliou in the 18th century, the Greek Orthodox Bishop Serafeim Byzantios notes that "as the Souliotes speak Albanian, most villages of Lakka speak Albanian, but Greek is not unknown to them". The closest existing variant of Souliotic Albanian is that of the village Anthousa (Rapëza) and also Kanallaki. This dialect is spoken only by few people in modern times.

Further evidence on the language of the Souliotes is drawn from the Rhomaic (Greek)-Albanian dictionary composed in 1809 mainly by Markos Botsaris and his family members. The Albanian variant in the text shows lexical influence from Greek, Turkish and other languages. Of 1494 Albanian words of the vocabulary, 361 are loanwords from Greek, 187 from Turkish, 21 from Italian and two from other languages. The Albanian entries correspond to 1701 Greek entries. Many entries are related to religion and church organization. For Jochalas who edited and published the dictionary, despite the influence of Greek on Souliotic Albanian in the entries, it is evident that Botsaris and his family members who helped him lacked structural knowledge of Greek and were very inexperienced in writing. He also observes that the Albanian phrases are syntaxed as if were Greek (Yochalas, p. 53). Similar lack of knowledge of Greek grammar, syntax and spelling is observed for all of the very few written documents by Souliotes. Robert Elsie noted that the 1,484 Albanian lexemes "are important for our knowledge of the now extinct Suliot dialect of Albanian". In the early twentieth century among the descendants of Souliotes in the Kingdom of Greece, there was an example of Souliote still being fluent in Albanian, namely lieutenant Dimitrios (Takis) Botsaris, a direct descendant of the Botsaris' family.

The correspondence of the Souliotes to both Christian and Muslim leaders was either written in Greek or translated from Greek. Greek was commonly used in Ottoman Epirus for writing not just between Christians (including Souliotes) but even between Muslim Albanian-speakers who employed Greek secretaries as is, e.g., the case with the correspondence between the Cham beys and Ali pasha. A written account on the language Souliotes used is the diary of Fotos Tzavellas, composed during his captivity by Ali Pasha (1792–1793). This diary is written by F. Tzavellas himself in simple Greek with several spelling and punctuation mistakes. Emmanouel Protopsaltes, former professor of Modern Greek History at the University of Athens, who published and studied the dialect of this diary, concluded that Souliotes were Greek speakers originating from the area of Argyrkokastro or Chimara. Εmmanuel Protopsaltis asserted based on his reading of the texts that the national sentiment and the basic ethnic and linguistic component of Souli was Greek rather than Albanian. Psimouli criticizes the publication by Protopsaltis for its lack of critical analysis.

==== Toponyms ====
In a study by scholar Petros Fourikis examining the onomastics of Souli, most of the toponyms and micro-toponyms such as: Kiafa, Koungi, Bira, Goura, Mourga, Feriza, Stret(h)eza, Dembes, Vreku i Vetetimese, Sen i Prempte and so on were found to be derived from Albanian. A study by scholar Alexandros Mammopoulos (1982) concludes that not all the toponyms of Souli were Albanian and that many derive from various other Balkan languages, including quite a few in Greek. In a 2002 study, Shkëlzen Raça states that Souliote toponyms listed by Fourikis can only be explained through Albanian. Vasso Psimouli (2006) states that many of the placenames of the wider area of Souli are Slavic or Aromanian (Zavruho, Murga, Sqapeta, Koristiani, Glavitsa, Samoniva, Avarico), while those of the core of the four Souliotic settlements are mostly Albanian.

== Relations with Ottoman officials ==
=== 1685–1772 ===
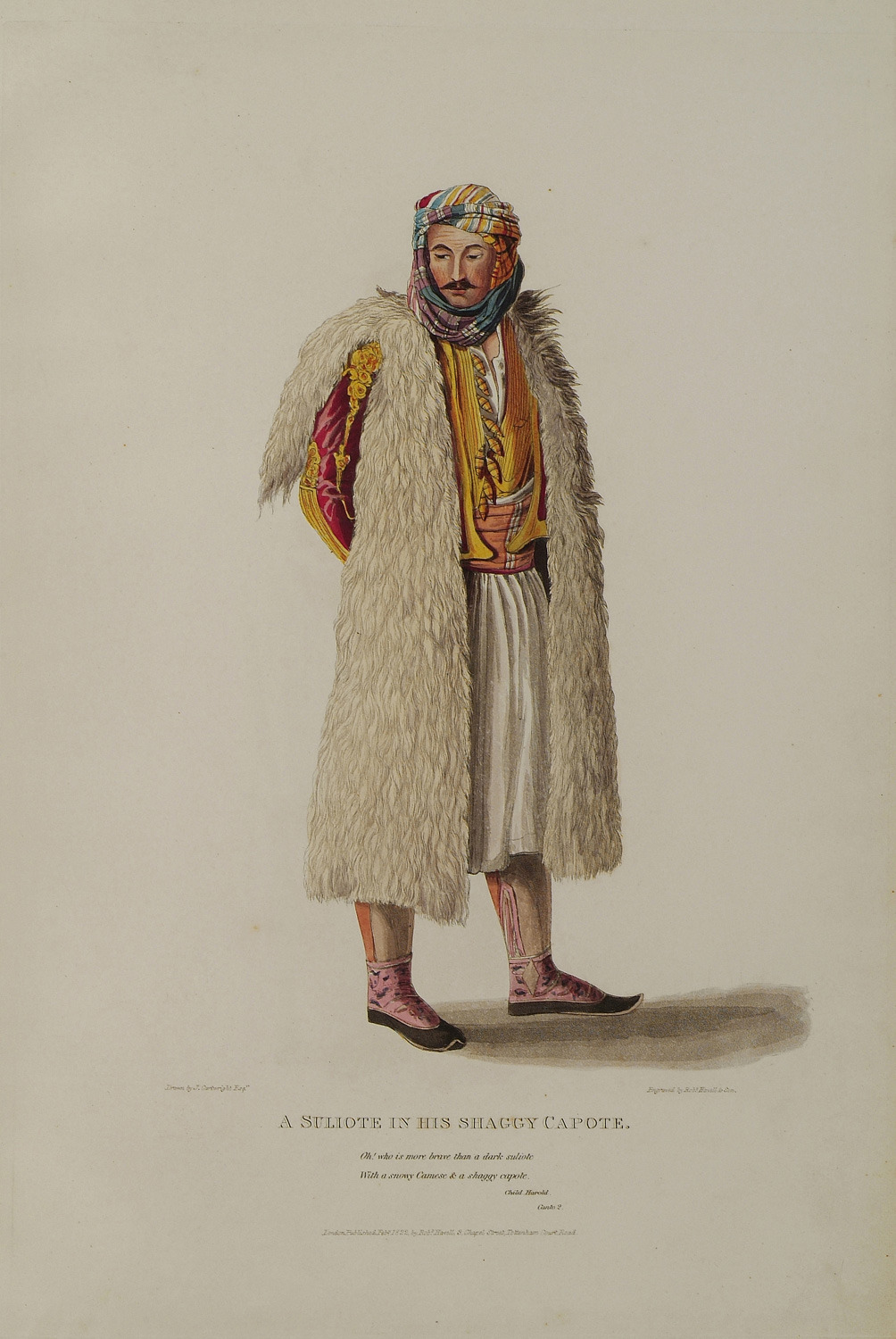
A Suliote in his shaggy Capote (Joseph Cartwright, 1822).

The first historical account of anti-Ottoman activity in Souli dates from the Ottoman-Venetian War of 1684–89. In particular in 1685, the Souliotes together with the inhabitants of Himara revolted and overthrew the local Ottoman authorities. This uprising was short-lived due to the reaction of the local Ottoman beys, agas and pashas.

Perraivos (1815) based on oral stories he collected proposed that the first attack against Souli by the Ottoman authorities occurred in 1721. Archival sources show that the campaign occurred more likely in 1731-33 and didn't have Souliotes as its specific target. In the early 18th century, the Muslim Cham beys of Margariti and the Souliotes promoted Venetian interests in certain areas of Epirus. In this context, an armatolos of Preveza known by the name Triboukis who supported French commercial interests was murdered. At the same time, the beys of Margariti launched a raid campaign as far as south as Acarnania. The Souliotes who also promoted Venetian goals, either jointly or independently of the Cham beys, launched their own pillaging raids. The local Ottoman authorities gathered 10,000 troops under Aslanzade Hadji Mehmet Pasha who attacked the Cham beys and the armatoloi who engaged in pillaging and destroyed Margariti. Souli itself wasn't attacked in this campaign.

The second recorded attack against Souli in oral history occurred in 1754 by Mustafa Pasha of Yanina. This oral story is confirmed in archival sources and has been recorded in a text in the Church of St. Nicholas of Ioannina. During the transfer of some brigands from Margariti to Yanina the Souliotes attacked the guards and freed them. The text preserved in the Church of St. Nicholas notes that the person who had captured them was a Muslim from Margariti who was collaborating with them as he was the buyer of the stolen goods. This network of brigandage which the Muslim agas and beys of Margariti and the Souliotes had created in the region was the cause of the attack by Mustafa Pasha.

Other attacks in the same era include that Dost Bey, commander of Delvinë (1759) and Mahmoud Aga, governor of Arta (1762). During 1721–1772 the Souliotes managed to repulse a total of six military expeditions. As a result, they expanded their territory at the expense of the various Ottoman lords. Souliotes participated in the Orlov revolt that broke out around 1770 against Ottoman Empire, with the help of Russia. Many of the joined the Russian fleet. Their revolt was connected with the acts of Russian agents in Epirus, which continued till the 2nd Russo-Turkish War (1787–1792). The Russian agent Ludovicos or Luigi Sotiri (a doctor from Lefkada) came to Souli probably in 1771, carrying a letter from Alexei Grigoryevich Orlov, guns and ammunition and urged Souliotes to revolt. The Turks, who got informed on the movements of Souliotes, in March 1772 sent against them an army of 5.000 Muslim Albanians, who were defeated and their leader Suleyman was captured. The hostilities lasted till mid 1772. According to other source the Souliotes were attacked by 9.000 men under Suleyman Tsapari. In 1775, Kurt Pasha sent a military expedition to Souli that ultimately failed. During the Russo-Turkish War (1768–74), the inhabitants of Souli, as well as of other communities in Epirus were mobilized for another Greek uprising which became known as Orlov Revolt. In 1785 it was the time of Bekir pasha to lead another unsuccessful attack against them. In March 1789, during the Russo-Turkish War (1787–1792) the chieftains of Souli: Georgios and Dimitrios Botsaris, Lambros Tzavellas, Nikolaos and Christos Zervas, Lambros Koutsonikas, Christos Photomaras and Demos Drakos, agreed with Louitzis Sotiris, a Greek representative of the Russian side, that they were ready to fight with 2,200 men against the Muslims of Rumelia. This was the time when Ali Pasha became the local Ottoman lord of Ioannina.

Perraivos (1815) notes that by the end of the 18th century the central settlement of Souli had increased to 26 clans with a total of 450 families. The Greek peasants who were farmers in the lands which the Souliots had acquired were distinguished by the name of the village in which they dwelt. Clan, class and territorial labels had significance in addition to religion.

=== Ali Pasha-Souliot relations ===
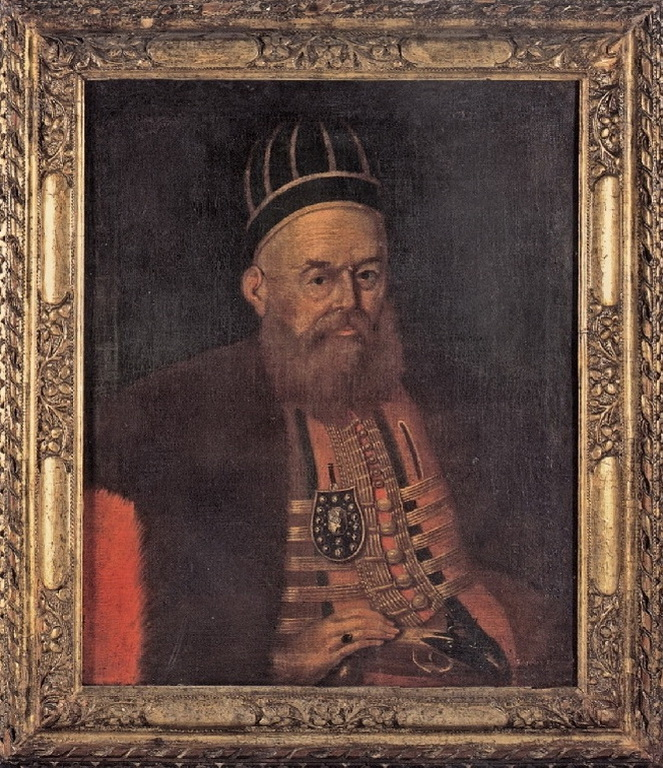
Ali Pasha of Yannina in a portrait by Spyridon Ventouras.

Relations between Ali Pasha and the Souliotes are documented since 1783 when the Souliotes had fought for Ali Pasha's army as allied mercenaries against Ahmet Kurt Pasha of the Pashalik of Berat. As soon as Ali Pasha became the local Ottoman ruler, all local factions which held power over tax collection were opposed to him. In February 1789, a coalition between the Muslim Albanian beys of Gjirokastër, Berat, Chameria and the Souliotes attempted to depose Ali Pasha. Clashes lasted for about 4 months and Ali Pasha was weakened but by May he signed an agreement with the Souliotes who abandoned the coalition and in exchange were given the right to act as armatoles in certain areas in Epirus and some of their clan leaders received wages from Ali Pasha. Ali Pasha managed to install as dervend agha (representative of the Pashalik of Yanina in Souli, one of his subordinates Andreas Iskos (relative of Georgios Karaiskakis) As part of the same agreement he held five children of prominent Souliote families as hostages. Ali Pasha launched successive spring-summer campaigns in 1789 and 1790. Although some Parasouliote settlements were captured, the defenders of Souli managed to repulse the attacks. Despite the end of the Russo-Turkish War, Ali Pasha was obsessed to capture this centre of resistance. Thus, he looked forward to implement indirect and long-term strategies since the numerical superiority of his troops proved inadequate.

In July 1792 Ali dispatched an army of c. 8,000–10,000 troops against the Souliotes. It initially managed to push the 1,300 Souliote defenders to the inner defiles of Souli and temporarily occupied the main settlement of the region. However, after a successful counterattack, the Ottoman Albanian units were routed with 2,500 of them killed. On the other hand, the Souliotes suffered minimal losses, but Lambros Tzavelas, one of their main leaders, was mortally wounded. The 1792 attack ended in Souliote victory and in the negotiations, the Botsaris clan managed to be recognized by Ali Pasha as the lawful representative of Souli and George Botsaris as the one who would enforce the terms of peace among the Souliotes.

During the following seven years Ali Pasha undertook preparations to take revenge for the defeat. Meanwhile, he besieged the French-controlled towns of the Ionian coast. Especially two of them, Preveza and Parga, were vital to Souli for the supply of livestock and ammunition. Perraivos records that, in his pursuit to gather all incomes of all large estate holders of the area in order to augment his political power, Ali tried to buy from Bekir bey, the sipahi of Souli, the timariot rights in Souli and, facing his obstinate refusal, killed him.

At the fall of Preveza in late 1798, Ali Pasha managed to secure the neutrality of Souliotes through bribery. The biggest of the Souliot clans which negotiated and eventually collaborated with Ali Pasha and integrated itself in the local Ottoman hierarchy were the Botsaris clan. Perraivos (1815) is one of the contemporary historians who recorded the collaboration of Botsaris with Ali Pasha since the spring of 1800. Perraivos attributes this shift to the "madness of greed" of George Botsaris (grandfather of Markos Botsaris) whom he calls a "paid traitor". Other historians of the 19th century follow the same assessment. In modern historiography, the explanation of his political stance through "greed" is considered an oversimplification. Like all other Souliot clans, the Botsaris first and foremost worked for the interests of their own clan, and sought to improve the wealth and political position of their clan, hence the stance of George Botsaris and all Souliot leaders is interpreted in this framework. For the Botsaris clan, since 1799 when Ali Pasha took control of the villages of Lakka Souli which were previously under the sphere of influence of the Botsaris clan, integration in the Ottoman system was the only viable political option. In 1800, George Botsaris received a large sum and the position of the armatolos of Tzoumerka, and the Botsaris clan left Souli and settled in Vourgareli of Arta. This was the first time that a Souliot clan became part of the Ottoman political system. The departure of the Botsaris clan weakened Souli as they were a significant part of its force.

In June–July 1800 a new campaign was mounted by Ali involving 11,500 troops. When this direct assault failed, Ali resorted to long-term measures to subdue the warrior community. In order to isolate the seven main villages of Souli from the Parasouliote villages as well as Parga and Preveza, Ali ordered the construction of tower fortifications around Souli. For two years the Souliotes were able to survive this encirclement by the smuggling of supplies from Parga and from nearby Paramythia and Margariti. Nevertheless, a lack of food and supplies was taking its toll. In April 1802 the Souliotes received a supply of food, weapons and ammunition by a French corvette stationed in Parga. This intervention by the French offered Ali the pretext for a new expedition against them with the support of the agas and beys of Epirus and southern Albania.

=== Fall of Souli (1803) ===
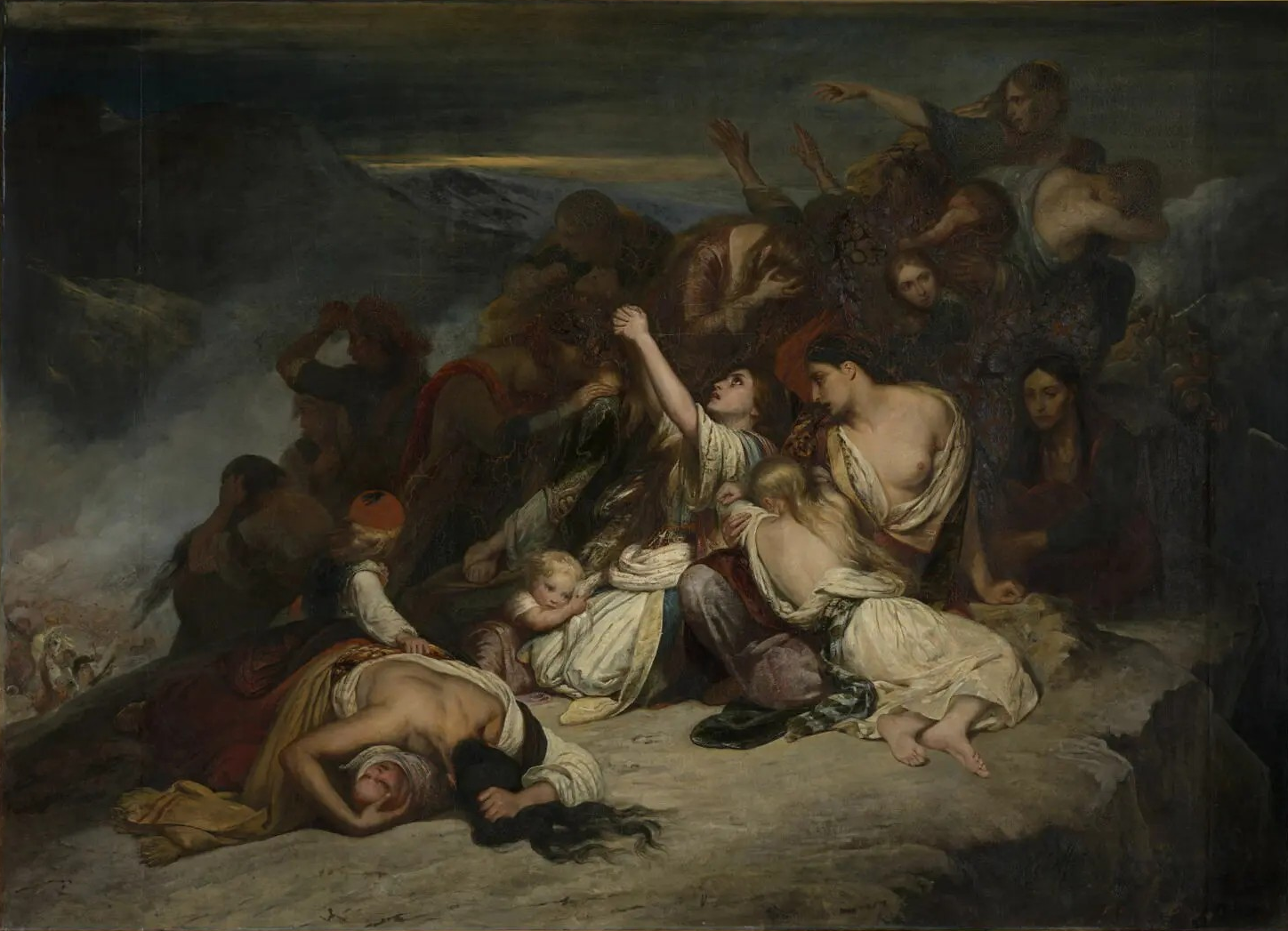
The Women of Souli. Romantic painting by Ary Scheffer (1795–1858), depicting the folklore suicide of Souliote women known as the Dance of Zalongo during the Souliote wars (1827, Oil on canvas, Musée du Louvre, Paris, France).

In 1803 the position of the Souliotes became desperate with the artillery and famine depleting their ranks. On the other hand, the defenders in Souli sent delegations to the Russian Empire, the Septinsular Republic and France for urgent action but without success. As the situation became more desperate in the summer of the same year, Ali's troops began assaults against the seven core villages of Souli. Meanwhile, the British turned to the Ottoman Empire in order to strengthen their forces against Napoleon, and the weapons and ammunition supplies were interrupted. Without support from outside and wearied by years of siege, the unity of the Souliote clans started to split. As such two chieftains, Athanasios Koutsonikas and Pilios Gousis, withdrew from the defense.

However, the rest in Souli gathered together in Saint George's Orthodox Church and decided either to fight or die. The remaining Souliotes numbered at no more than 2,000 armed men. The main leaders were Fotos Tzavellas, Dimos Drakos, Tousas Zervas, Koutsonikas, Gogkas Daglis, Giannakis Sehos, Fotomaras, Tzavaras, Veikos, Panou, Zigouris Diamadis, and Georgios Bousbos. They won all the decisive battles. Without food and ammunition, they were forced to withdraw to the fortresses of Kiafa and Kougi, where they lost the last battle on December 7, 1803. Following that, the Souliotes concluded an armistice with Veli Pasha, Ali's son and commander of the expedition. Finding their defense untenable in the long run, they agreed upon a treaty on 12 December which obliged them to abandon their homeland. They were allowed to leave with arms, the necessities of war, foodstuffs and whatever else they wished to take.

When the last Souliot tribes left, monk Samuel stayed with 5 Souliots in the fortified monastery of Saint Paraskevi in Kugi, in order to surrender war supplies to deputies of Veli, son of Ali, but the gunpowder exploded during the surrender. According to Perraivos, Samuel, enraged at the insult of one of Veli's deputies, set himself ablaze opting for death instead of surrender, while according to the Alipasiad and to a "remembrance" written on a fresco in a church of Seliani, the blow-up was an action of Fotos Tzavelas, in compliance with Ali's orders. The Ottoman Albanian troops violated this treaty and attacked groups of Souliotes. In one instance a group of Souliote women was attacked when heading to Zalongo and c. 22 of them being trapped decided to turn towards the cliff's edge together with their infants and children rather than surrender. According to tradition (see Dance of Zalongo) they did this one after the other while dancing and singing. Other Souliotes reached Parga, which was under Russian control at the time. They either settled down there or set off for the Ionian Islands.

== Exile (1803–1820) ==
After the surrender of Souli, Souliote clans chose divergent paths but many were ultimately led to move to the Ionian Islands and in south Greece. Kitsos Botsaris who had succeeded his father as armatolos of Tzoumerka became a target. Botsaris gathered his clan and 1,200 Souliotes who retreated to Agrafa. In January 1804, they were attacked by Ali Pasha's army under Beqir Bey with support from the local armatoloi Zikos Michos, Tzimas Alexis and Poulis. As the Botsaris clan was given the important armatolik of Tzoumerka, other armatoloi had targeted them. The Souliotes were besieged for 3 months on the grounds of the monastery of the Assumption of Mary. In the final battle, on April 7, most Souliotes were killed and of those who survived many were taken hostage. About 80 escaped from this battle. Ali Pasha at the same time published a firman which targeted the Botsaris clan which was hunted down. Kitsos Botsaris and his family with a few others managed to escape to Parga and later settled in the Ionian Islands. He returned to the Pashalik of Yanina in 1813 when Ali Pasha gave him again the armatolik of Tzoumerka but as soon as he returned he was murdered by a Gogos Bakolas.

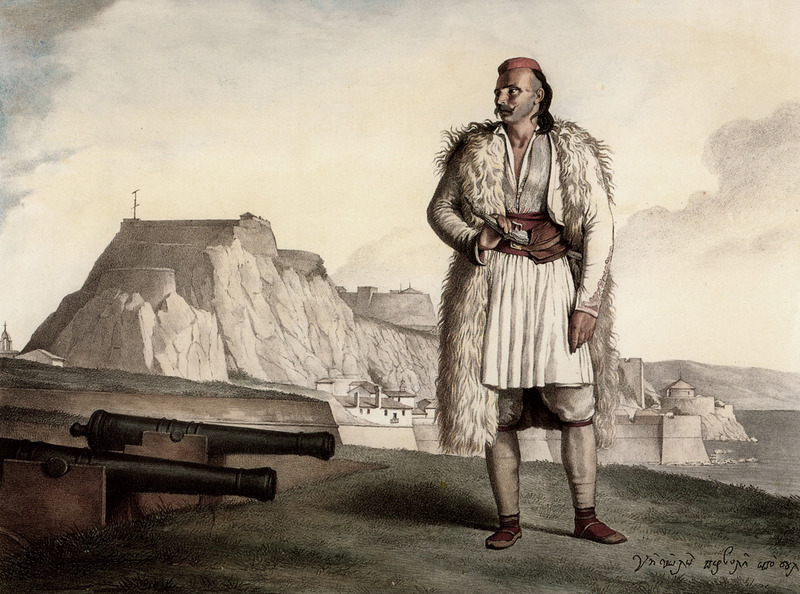
A Souliote in Corfu by Louis Dupré (1825)

Many Souliotes entered service with the Russians on Corfu, where they became an important component of the "Greek Legion". This was a regiment of irregulars organized by the Russians among mainland refugees; it not only included Souliotes, but also Himariotes, Maniots, and other Greek klephts and armatoloi. The formation of this unit was undertaken by the Greek-born Russian colonel Emmanouil Papadopoulos. Its organization was laid down by Papadopoulos in a leaflet in Greek titled "Explanations on the establishment of a legion of Epiro-Souliotes and Himaro-Peloponnesians in the service of His Imperial Majesty Alexander I ...". He recognized that Souliotes and the others were already naturally trained in irregular tactics and did not have to conform to the Western regular tactics. This unit was eventually named "Legion of Light Riflemen". The Souliotes participated in campaigns in Naples in 1805, Tenedos in 1806, Dalmatia in 1806, and during the defense of Lefkada in 1807.

With the Treaty of Tilsit in 1807 and the détente between Russia and France, the Russian forces withdrew from the Ionian Islands and the French occupied them. The Souliotes and other components of Russian units entered service with the French in various units, such as the Battaglione dei Cacciatori Macedoni and the Régiment Albanais (Albanian Regiment), terms which did not have their later ethnic connotation, but were instead stylized terms that described the soldiers' general origins or mode of fighting.
Colonel Minot, the commander of the regiment, appointed as battalion captains mostly the leaders of Souliote clans who enjoyed the respect among the soldiers. Among them were: Tussa Zervas, George Dracos, Giotis Danglis, Panos Succos, Nastullis Panomaras, Kitsos Palaskas, Kitsos Paschos. Fotos Tzavellas, Veicos Zervas.

During the Anglo-French struggle over the Ionian Islands between 1810 and 1814, the Souliotes in French service faced off against other refugees organized by the British into the Greek Light Infantry Regiment. Since the Souliotes were mostly garrisoned on Corfu, which remained under French control until 1814, very few entered British service. The British disbanded the remnants of the Souliot Regiment in 1815 and subsequently decommissioned their own two Greek Light Regiments. This left many of the Souliotes and other military refugees without livelihoods. In 1817, a group of veterans of Russian service on the Ionian Islands traveled to Russia to see if they could get patents of commission and employment in the Russian army. While unsuccessful in this endeavor, they joined the Filiki Etaireia ("Company of Friends"), the secret society founded in Odessa in 1814 for the purpose of liberating Greek lands from Ottoman rule. They returned to the Ionian Islands and elsewhere and began to recruit fellow veterans into the Philike Etaireia, including a number of Souliot leaders.

== Participation in the Greek War of Independence ==
=== Return to Souli (1820-1822) ===
Flag raised by the leader of the Souliotes, Markos Botsaris, in Souli, October 1820, after the exile in the Ionian islands. The flag depicts St. George and reads in Greek: "Freedom", "Fatherland", "Religion".

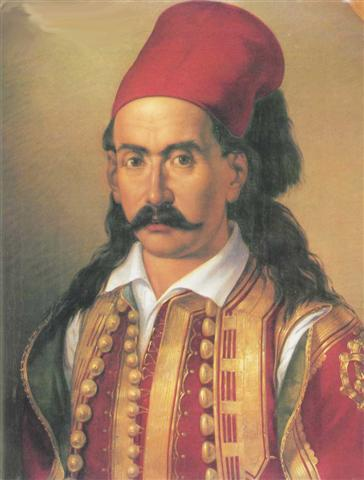
Markos Botsaris

In July 1820 the Sultan issued a hatt-ı Şerif against Ali Pasha of Yannina proclaiming him an outlaw and subsequently called Christians and Muslims persecuted by Ali to aid the Sultan's troops promising the return of their properties and villages. As in summer 1820 both the Sultan and Ali sought the military assistance of the Souliots, Ioannis Kapodistrias, the Greek serving as foreign minister of Russia, who had visited his native Corfu in 1819 and was concerned about the predicament of the Souliots, communicated to the Souliot leaders via his two brothers in Corfu his encouragement to take advantage of this opportunity in order to return to their homeland. The Souliots of Corfu promtply submitted a request to Ismail Pasha, the leader of the Sultan's army, and joined his force along with Markos Botsaris and other Souliots dispersed through Epirus. As Ismail Pasha, also known as Pashobey, temporized, fearful of the Souliots's return to their stronghold, they decided, four months later, in November 1820, to change camps and began secret negotiations with their old enemy, Ali. In part thanks to Ali's appeal to their shared Albanian origin, but mainly after he offered to allow them to return to their land, the Souliots agreed in December to support him to lift the Sultan's siege of Yannina in return for their resettlement in Souli. Οn December 12, the Souliotes liberated the region of Souli, both from Muslim Lab Albanians, who were previously installed by Ali Pasha as settlers, and Muslim Cham Albanians, allies of Pashobey. They also captured the Kiafa fort.

The uprising of the Souliotes, among the first to revolt against the Sultan, like the rest of the other Greek exiles in the Ionian islands, inspired the revolutionary spirit among the other Greek communities. Soon they were joined by additional Greek communities (armatoles and klephts). Later, in January 1821, even the Muslim Albanians faithful to Ali Pasha signed an alliance with them and 3,000 Christian soldiers were fighting against the Sultan in Epirus. The Souliot struggle had initially a local character, but an understanding of the Souliotes and Muslim Albanians with Ali Pasha was in accordance with the plans of Alexandros Ypsilantis, leader of the Philike Etaireia, for the preparation for the Greek revolution. The Greek revolutionaries wished to lengthen Ali's siege in order to withhold the Sultan's army in Epirus, but the Souliots considered lifting the siege as a precondition for securing their control of Souli and under the military leadership of Markos Botsaris tried to control the road leading from Arta to Ioannina to interrupt the supplies for the Sultan's army. Christophoros Perraivos, sent by Ypsilantis to Epirus and aiming to connect Ali's and the Souliots's struggle with the objectives of the Greek revolution, proposed to attack the seaside forts of Preveza and Parga, but Markos Botsaris and the Muslim Albanians rejected his plans, operated eastwards of Souli and after occupying a number of positions they managed to interrupt the sending of supplies from Arta and control most of Epirus, greatly advancing the objectives of the Filiki Eteria.

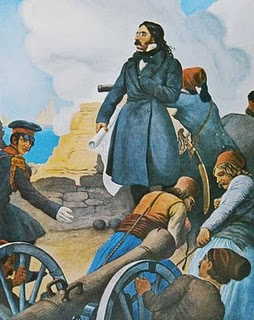
Alexandros Mavrokordatos defending Messolonghi (by Peter von Hess)

In continuation of their cooperation during the summer, the Souliots, Muslim Albanian beys and the Greek armatoles of Acarnania signed in September a tripartite alliance to aid Ali and each other even against Ali, should he become powerful enough to turn against one of them. In October an envoy acting on the instructions of Alexandros Mavrokordatos, the Phanariot Greek who had been in Messolonghi from July, sought and managed to persuade all three parties to recognize the central administration of the Greek revolutionaries taking shape in Messologhi in return for help against Arta. In November they sent representatives to the assembly that established a constitutional charter for Western Continental Greece and they made a common attack on the city of Arta, which they captured and plundered, provoking the counterattack of Hurshid Pasha, the Sultan's new commander in chief in Yannina. Upon information of massacres of local Muslims in the Peloponnese after the beginning of the Greek revolts and after witnessing anti-Muslim actions in Messolonghi the Muslim Albanian agas perceived the religious character and divergent aims of the Greek Revolution and apprised of Ali's slim chances of success, they abandoned the Souliots and Ali and joined the Ottomans, accepting the proposals of the Albanian Omer Vrioni, a delegate of Hurshid Pasha, which the Christian Souliots, confident in their connection with the revolutionaries, rejected. As such Ago Muhurdar, a Muslim Albanian previously loyal to Ali stated: "Souliots! Until today we were servants of you and your allies... we were deceived because now we see clearly that both you and your co-religionists fight for your faith and freedom. Your war for faith and freedom is clearly a war against our faith and ruler".

Distanced from their thitherto Albanian allies, the Souliots turned to the government of revolted Greece, to which they had sent a plenipotentiary, Fotos Bomporis, a man born in Preveza from a family originating from Himara, to represent them in the First National Assembly at Epidaurus, the first legislative body of the provisional Greek Government that convened in December 1821 and January 1822, issuing the declaration of independence of the Greek nation. Trying to bind the Souliots in the Revolution, Mavrokordatos, now elected president of the Executive, appointed Notis Botsaris Minister of War, a position he declined, opting to carry on as chieftain in endangered Souli, but his nephew Markos stayed in revolted Greece with a view to a joint operation of Souliots and the revolutionaries against Hurshid.

After Hurshid captured Ali and had him decapitated in January 1822, he decided to turn his attention to the rebels at Souli and laid siege to it. In May 1822 the desperate resistance of c. 2,000 defenders of Souli managed to repel a 15,000-strong army, led by Hurshid Pasha, consisting mostly of Albanians, the agas of Chameria along with Ghegs, Labs and Tosks, who secretly aided the Souliots. To secure western Central Greece, his political base, from the Sultan's forces, Mavrocordatos approved the proposal of Markos Botsaris and the Souliots for a military campaign against Arta as a diversion to help Souli and personally assumed its leadership, but the Greek forces met with crushing defeat in the battle of Peta in July. With annual revenue from the tithes of Karleli and Vonitsa, that Botsaris had rented, insufficient to procure food and ammunition and without external assistance, the Souliots, famishing isolated in their mountains, were forced to seek British mediation, signed the surrender of Souli to the Sultan's forces in July and abandoned their lands for a second and final time in September, armed and carrying their movable property, heading to the Ionian islands.

=== In the revolutionary armies ===
Markos Botsaris opted to remain in Acarnania and developed a friendship with Mavrokordatos, who was similarly tainted with failure and in need of a local footing, becoming the head of his political faction (later known as the English Party) in western Greece, and commonly toured the area trying to dissuade the locals from submitting to the marching Ottoman army under Kütahı. On Mavrokordatos's orders, after the submission of most armed chiefs from Western Roumeli to the Ottomans, Botsaris was promoted to general and successfully assumed command of the defense of Messolonghi during its first siege in late 1822. Meanwhile, the Souliots, unable to secure a living by offering armed service in the Ionian islands, sought to migrate to the Greek mainland and Botsaris, who wanted to form a military unit loyal to himself in order to assert his position, coordinated their gathering at Messolonghi, not far from their homeland, under the aegis of Mavrokordatos, who needed a mercenary army to gain political and military power in western Greece against the local armatoloi.

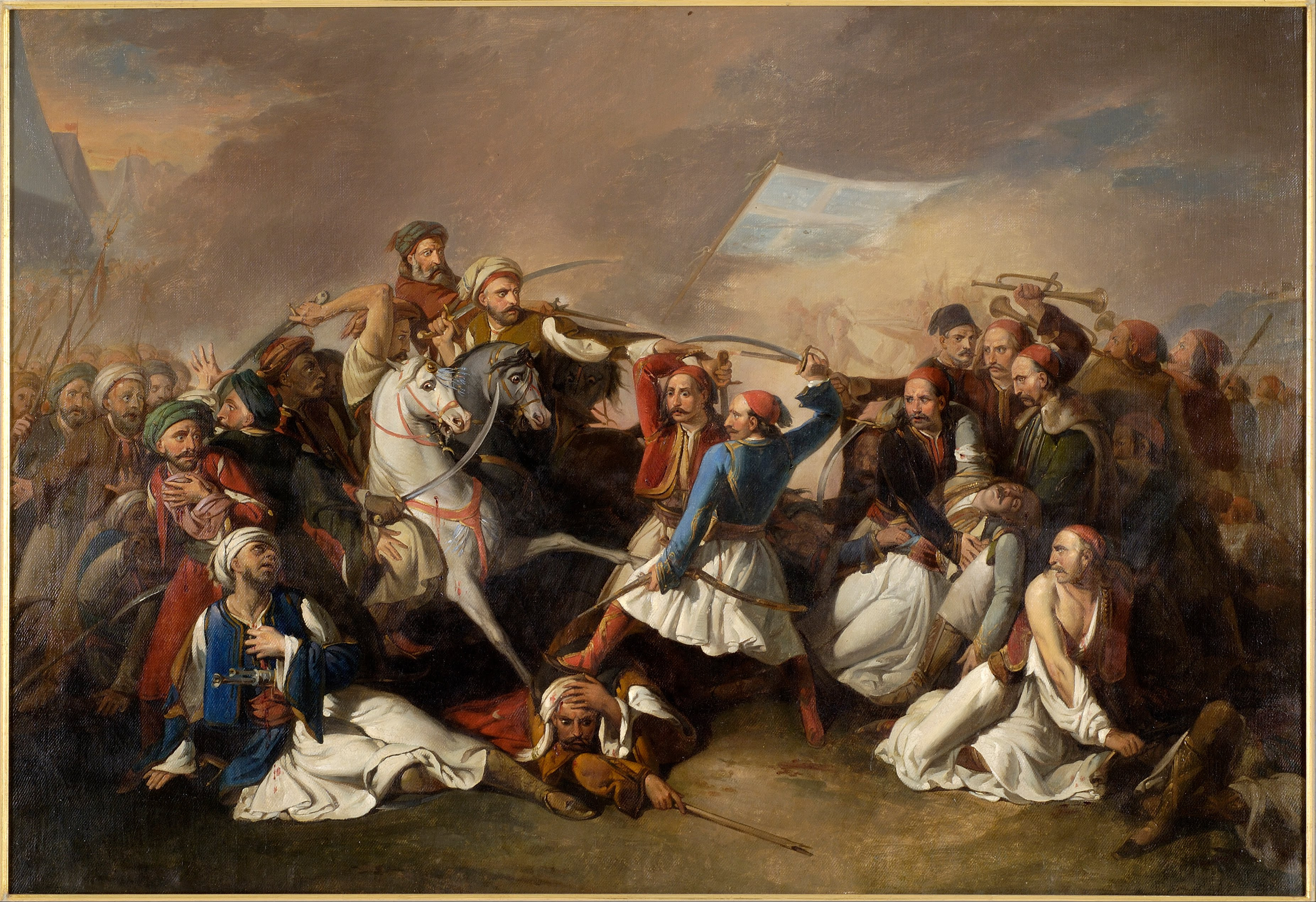
The death of Markos Botsaris at the Battle of Karpenisi (1823). Painting by Ludovico Lipparini

In early 1823 western Central Greece was beset by infighting among notables, armed chiefs and Mavrokordatos, who sought to promote those loyal to him. When the Tzavellas clan, who, according to primary sources "couldn't stand the fame of Markos Botsaris", moved to western Greece from the Ionian Islands, they tried to group with his adversaries. As they were poor and with no salary, they were eventually contracted by Mavrokordatos, who ordered them, in manner similar to the practices of the Ottomans and other Greek armed groups, to wage war against and plunder the province of Agrafa which was under the control of Georgios Karaiskakis. After they plundered Agrafa, the Tzavellas clan joined Karaiskakis and abandoned Mavrokordatos as he had designated Markos Botsaris "General of Western Greece". The two clans had a very deep hostility to each other that throughout the war they supported opposed factions and refused to fight under the same command. In an effort to release the tension and daily infighting between leaders of armed bands, all of them, including newly arrived from the Ionians Zygouris Tzavellas, were elevated to the generalship, leading Markos to tear apart the certificate of his rank in protest. In August the Roumeliot and Souliot forces of 1,200 men met with the 5,000-strong vanguard of the Ottoman army of Mustafa Pasha of Skodra in Karpenisi and Botsaris, leading 350 Souliots, attempted a nightly surprise attack into the camp of the Muslim Albanians, who bore identical arms and spoke the same language, but, operating alone and, contrary to plan, left to fight unsupported by other armed chiefs, except for the Souliot Kitsos Tzavellas, was killed with a bullet in his head. Botsaris's death immediately provoked universal praise in Greece for his military skill and his prudence, he was acclaimed as "worthy of illustrious Greek forefathers", his feat was popularized by philhellenic committees across Europe and he became a legendary figure, enlisted among Greek national heroes.

In December 1823, the philhellene Lord Byron arrived at Messolonghi and, having heard of Markos's and the Souliots's bravery, formed an armed band of 500 Souliots, who were attracted by the money Byron, the administrator of the loans the Greeks had recently contracted with City bankers, was reputed to carry. Bands of Souliot chieftains did not only comprise Souliots, as, to increase their clout, they had allowed their bands to include fighters from Roumeli, who were after higher wages, but, charged by the government, Byron favoured enlisting true Souliots. In contrast with fighters in the bands of Roumeliot armed chiefs, for whom the various provinces of Roumeli undertook their subsistence, the livelihood of the Souliots as well as that of their families in the Ionian islands, depended solely on the wages they received for their armed services from the revolutionary administration, as was generally the case with fighters from northern Greece, thus steering the Souliots towards a constant, unaccommodable demand for their salaries. The concentration of many Souliot families in Mesologgi was a source of deep concern for the locals. The armed clashes between them were frequent as Souliotes engaged in robberies and even took possession of parts of the houses of locals for their own families, while claiming Greekness as a privilege enjoyed exclusively by themselves and berating other Christians in the city as rayah. The locals refused to supply the Souliotes with food, housing and other necessary materials because of the bad relations between them and the ties they had to local forces. Enraged at the troubles they provoked, Byron threatened to leave the city, if the Souliots stayed there, paid them part of the salaries due, accepting a request of the notables, and disbanded them, hiring fighters from various regions in their stead. The Souliots moved to Anatoliko and, after Byron's death, days later, in April 1824, they were enlisted by other captains, leaving western Central Greece.

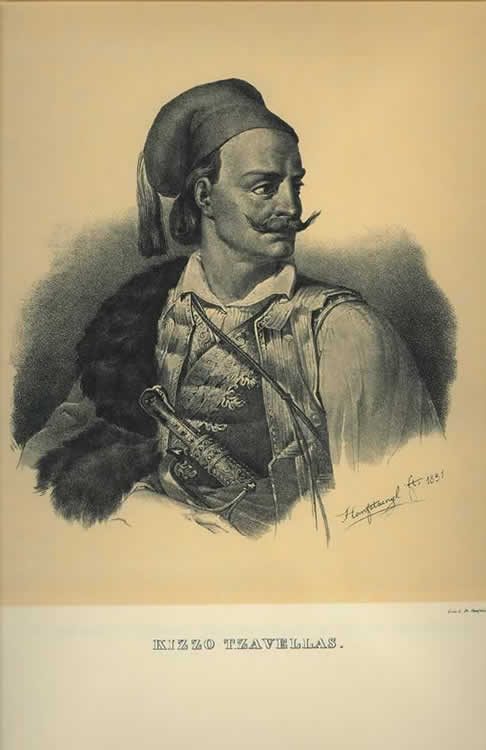
Kizzo Tzavellas, by Karl Krazeisen

During this period, the Souliots integrated in a new reality, defined by their incorporation in the national, political and military goals of the Greek Revolution and their Hellenization, while maintaining their organization in autonomous, competing clans, remnants of the old clans. Despite their inability to unify under the same command, due to the clan antagonism that determined their accession to opposing armed bands or political factions, the Souliots remained experienced and formidable warriors to be employed by the Greek Administration on a high pay scale. They took part in all the battles fought against Ibrahim pasha and were sent into besieged Messolonghi. After the failure of the Greek navy to break the siege and bring supplies, the city's defenders, increasingly unified by the experience of a protracted siege, rejected the shameful terms offered by their hatred enemy, the Ottomans, who, unconscious of the revolutionary character of the war, asked them to surrender their arms, their only means of subsistence, and many Souliots died during the sortie in April 1826. Many Souliots, including distinguished officers of important clans, were also killed in the battle of Analatos in 1827. Addressing the Third National Council of the provisional Greek government in 1827 Kitsos Tzavelas stressed the sacrifice of the Souliotes for a common fatherland. The gradual integration of the Souliots in the Greek national cause was noticed by and perhaps amused their contemporaries, such as the embittered Ahmet Nepravistha, the dervenaga of Kravara, who in a letter replying to Kitsos Tzavellas's request to surrender, took note of their mutation and, pointing out their shared Albanian origin, sarcastically called into question Tzavellas's Greekness. After defeating him next month, in October 1828, Tzavellas had Ahmet's and his men's foreheads stigmatized with the Phoenix, the emblem of the First Hellenic Republic.

== Settlement in Greece and legacy ==
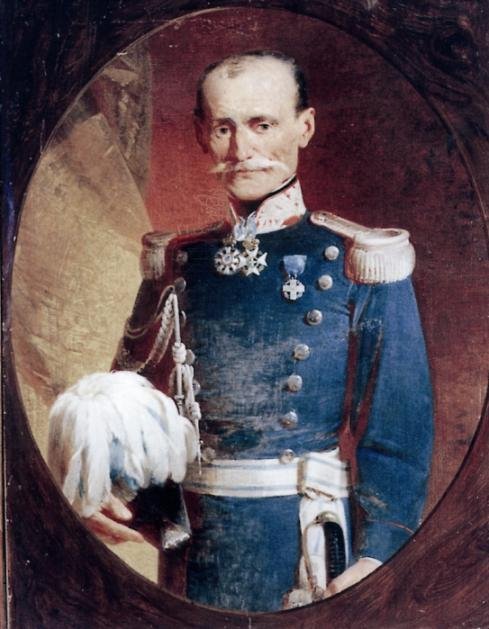
Kostas Botsaris, brother of Markos Botsaris, lived on to serve in the Greek army like many exiled Souliotes.

Souliote groups had already moved during the war to areas which would form part of the Greek Kingdom. After the Greek War of Independence, the Souliotes could not return to their homeland as it remained outside the borders of the newly formed Greek state. Different groups of refugees who settled in Greece after the war despite their common status as refugees had their own peculiarities, interests and customs. The Souliotes, alongside people from the area of Arta and the rest of Epirus, in many cases insisted on being represented as a separate group in their affairs with the Greek state and maintain their own representatives. In other cases are grouped together with the other Epirote refugees as "Epirosouliotes" or just "Epirotes". The Souliots were considered to have "a sense of superiority" and were seen by some as being arrogant because they considered themselves to be superior in military affairs in their participation in the war. This feeling of superiority of Souliotes was not only directed towards other groups of refugees but also towards the central authorities. In such conditions, it was difficult for the Souliotes to follow the central government and they were constantly a source of "reaction and mutinies". A local relation from Agrinio (1836) to the central government reports that as the Souliotes were jobless and without land they had resorted to looting and robbing the local population.

Since at least 1823 when many of them moved from the Ionian islands to western Greece, the Souliotes had been aiming to settle in Mesologgi, Agrinio, Nafpaktos. In the area of Agrinio (then Vrachori), the Souliotes asked from the government of Petrobey Mavromichalis to be given land in Zapadi. The locals were against this decision and the situation deteriorated to the point of threat of civil war. Thus the ultimate decision by the government was postponed and later abandoned as the position was considered vulnerable to Ottoman attacks from the frontier. In other areas of Agrinio, the Souliotes settled simply by occupying without a legal permit public land and even landed property whose owners weren't there. This move angered the locals, who considered these lands to belong to them. The land distribution affair fueled for many years the dispute between those dubbed as the "autochthonous" (natives) Agriniotes and the "heterochthonous" (foreigners) Souliotes.

At the Third National Assembly at Troezen, the Souliotes requested to be given land in the Peloponnese near Epidaurus but this proposal remained postponed as well. On July 24, 1829, the Souliotes submitted a new report which asked from the government of Ioannis Kapodistrias 1)to find land of their settlement 2)to pay them back wages for the participation in the war 3)to enact measures for widows and orphans. These proposals were met with support by Kapodistrias. Since March 1829, many Souliotes had fought for the capture of Nafpaktos and their contribution was major in this victory. The Souliotes who fought in this battle believed that the best landed property and housing of Nafpaktos belonged to them since they capture the area so they occupied and took them as their own. There were some negative reactions to their activity from locals, but only to a small degree possibly because the population of the town had dwindled during the war and it had to be repopulated. In Nafpaktos, the locals were rather friendly towards them and supported their request to build their own settlement nearby; as such, according to Kostavasilis (2002) per Raikos (1957) "Nafpaktos became their second homeland".

Despite the settlement of groups of Souliotes via the occupation of landed property, a permanent solution to their resettlement didn't exist in 1829 and even during the early years of the reign of Othon I. Friedrich Thiersch, a contemporary of Kapodistrias, writes that he was concerned with resettling Souliotes, Cretans and Thessalians from the area of Mt. Olympus in the same area as members of their own community as he thought that their settlements would become dangerous areas. Such a consideration might be plausible, but modern historiography considers that the issue remained unsolved for a long time due to systemic factors and not because of the individual predisposition of Kapodistrias. At the Fifth National Assembly at Nafplion (late 1831- early 1832) the Souliotes were represented by Kitsos Tzavelas and Ioannis Bairaktaris. After many debates and requests by Souliotes to be given land, the delegates of the assembly agreed to give land only to Souliotes who fought in the war and to allow them to build their settlements in limited properties in Nafpaktos and Agrinio. In April/May 1834, the new government of Othon as a measure which sought to placate the Souliotes and the locals of the areas which would see Souliot settlement prepared a legal act which was never officially published. The government accepted the Souliot requests for the implementation of the decisions of 1831-32 "to the extent that no unknown obstacles exist". This formulation allowed for local interest groups in these areas to postpone the creation of the settlements which eventually were halted. As a reaction against the new decision, on September 26, 1834, the Souliotes from all three areas (Nafpaktos, Agrinio, Mesologgi) signed a petition and elected Kostas Botsaris as a representative to take all necessary measures for their requests to be accepted. This new initiative had no success and reports of Souliotes from this era attest to their claims of great poverty of Souliot families. A Souliot petition to Othon reports that they were forced to" sell their weapons, furniture and even their clothes to get food". The Souliotes informed Othon that "the only science they know is that of weapons" which they offered to him. The petition ends with the statement that if no solution is found for their settlements, they will be "forced to leave their desired [...] Greece, in which they fervently fought, and go to a foreign land in search for means to survive".

In Nafpaktos, where the population had dwindled during the war, Souliot resettlement moved ahead. Extensive landed properties had been given to Souliotes outside the boundaries of the castle and most of them engaged in agriculture. The locals and the Souliotes had good relations and the municipal authorities petitioned the government to speed up the procedure for the building of the new settlement. In Agrinio, local reactions against the Souliotes caused many delays. The part of the local population which reacted against them accused them that they didn't plan to settle there peacefully but that they would engage in robberies and pillaging against them. In 1836, Souliotes were among the groups who took part in the anti-Bavarian movements in Greece and this caused further distrust towards them from the central authorities. In time, the dispute between Souliotes and locals led to the partial construction of the settlement.

In 1854, during the Crimean War, a number of Greek military officers of Souliote descent, under Kitsos Tzavelas, participated in a failed revolt in Epirus, demanding union with Greece. Souliots settled in Athens made up the greatest part of Albanian-speaking Greeks that formed in 1898 the "Arvanitic Association" (Greek: "Αρβανίτικος Σύνδεσμος"), one of two associations that sought the creation of a unified Greco-Albanian state or of an Albanian principality under Greek suzerainty. Until 1909, the Ottomans kept a military base on the fortress of Kiafa. Finally in 1913, during the Balkan Wars, the Ottomans lost Epirus and the southern part of the region became part of the Greek state.

Members of the Souliote diaspora that lived in Greece played a major role in 19th- and 20th-century politics and military affairs, like Dimitrios Botsaris, the son of Markos Botsaris, and the World War II resistance leader Napoleon Zervas.

== Identity and ethnicity ==
In Ottoman-ruled Epirus, national identity did not play a role to the social classification of the local society; religion was the key factor of classification of the local communities. The Orthodox congregation was included in a specific ethno-religious community under Graeco-Byzantine domination called Rum millet. Its name was derived from the Byzantine (Roman) subjects of the Ottoman Empire, but all Orthodox Christians were considered part of the same millet in spite of their differences in ethnicity and language. According to this, the Muslim communities in Epirus were classified as Turks, while the Orthodox (Rum), were classified as Greeks. Moreover, national consciousness and affiliations were absent in Ottoman Epirus during this era. The Souliots's Christian faith became in due time a key element differentiating them from nearby Chams and leading them to connect with and rally around the neighbouring Greek population.

=== Self-identification ===
In the eighteenth century common traits in their appearance, such as displaying shaved forehead and temples, their social structure, common mores, and activities such as brigandage and war reinforced the sense of belonging in the same place-based community and gradually caused clan identities to transform into the consciousness of a particular moral and cultural community related to its abode, while distinguishing the Souliots from the surrounding Greek-speaking and Albanian-speaking populations. Among themselves, Souliotes spoke Albanian, despite the prestige of the Greek language in that period, and their social-anthropological organization faithfully reflected the Albanian customary law. At the beginning of the Greek War of Independence the Christian Albanian Souliotes were still unfamiliar with ideas of nationalism and they did not see themselves as leading "Greek armies", even declaring in a letter to the Russian Tsar that they do not have anything in common with the "other Greeks" (probably referring to the Rum millet), feeling closer to fellow Albanian Muslims instead. During the Greek War of Independence the Souliotes identified entirely with the Greek national cause.

=== Descriptions in contemporary and 19th-century accounts ===
==== Greek authors ====
During the emergence of Greek nationalism, at the cusp between the 18th and the 19th century, revolutionaries, such as Rigas Feraios and Adamantios Korais, referred admiringly to the Souliots and registered their conflict with Ali Pasha of Yanina as a national struggle for Greek independence. Athanasios Psalidas (1767–1829), Greek scholar and secretary to Ali Pasha in early 19th century stated that the Souliotes were Greeks fighting the Albanians and distinguishes Souliotes from "Arvanites". He also stated that they are part of the Cham population and their correspondent region, known as Chameria, was inhabited by both Albanians and Greeks with the later being more numerous, while the villages of Souli were inhabited by "Greek warriors". Adamantios Korais, major figure of the modern Greek Enlightenment states in 1803 that the Souliotes are the "pride of the Greeks".

==== Western authors ====
Amongst Western European travelers and authors traveling in the region during the nineteenth century, they described the Souliotes in different terms, while most of them were based on claims they have heard or read rather than on research-based evidence, dependent on their guides, without any knowledge of Greek and Albanian and having probably misunderstood the cultural and political reality of the region:

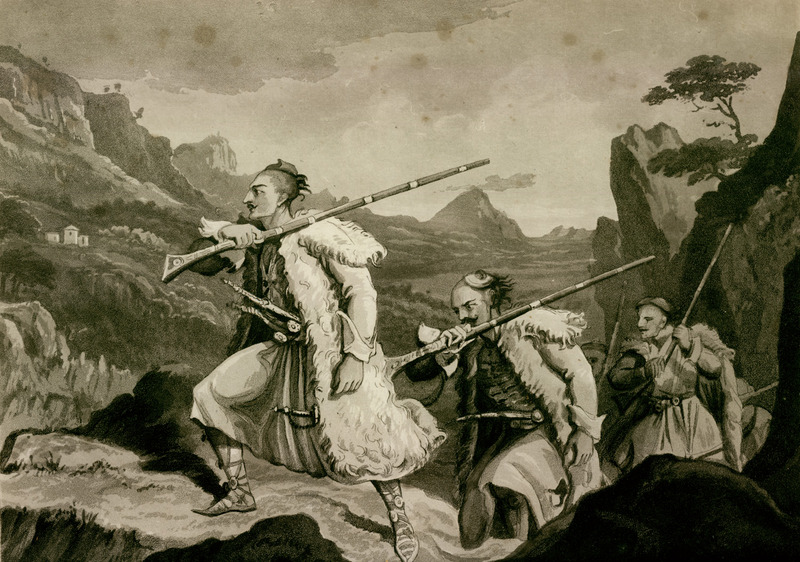
View of Albanian Palikars in Pursuit of an Enemy by Charles Robert Cockerell, published in a book by Thomas Smart Hughes (1820).

In 1813 Hobhouse stated the Souliotes "are all Greek Christians and speak Greek" and resembled more "the Albanian warrior than the Greek merchant". French historian Claude Fauriel described the Souliotes in 1814 as "a mixture of Greeks and Albanian Christians" who were originally refugees that settled in the Souli mountains. In the nineteenth century, the ethnic and geographical terms Albanian and Albania were used often to incorporate the people of the area and southern Epirus, now part of Greece.

British traveller Henry Holland wrote in 1815 that they were of "Albanian origin" and "belonging to the division of that people called the Tzamides" (Chams). R. A. Davenport stated in 1837 that were some people who believed that the "nucleus of the Suliote population consisted of Albanians" who had sought refuge in the mountains after the death of Skanderbeg, while other people claimed shepherds settled Souli from Gardhiki which in both cases was to escape Ottoman rule. In 1851 British traveler Edward Lear wrote the "mountains of Suli" were "occupied by Albanians" in the early medieval period and stayed Christian after the surrounding area converted to Islam. Traveler Henry Baerlin referred to the Souliotes as shouting their defiance in Albanian to "threatening Greek letters sent by Ali Pasha" during their wars. Traveler Brian de Jongh stated that the Souliots were of Albanian descent and "refugees from Albania [...] a branch of the Tosks", that kept "their Albanian mother tongue and Christian faith. A NY Times article from 1880 calls the Souliotes a "branch of the Albanian people" and referred to Souliote women like Moscho Tzavella as exemplary of "the extraordinary courage of the Albanian women... in the history of the country.

=== Identification by historiography ===
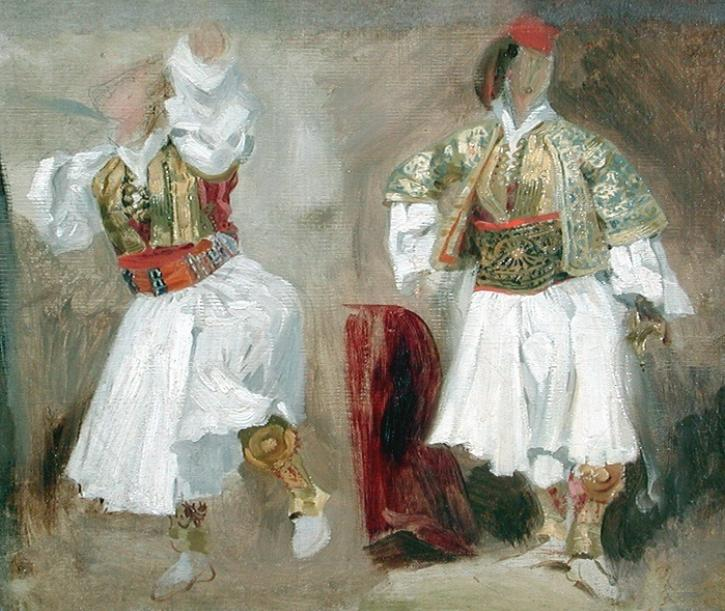
Souliotes in traditional costume. Sketch by Eugène Delacroix 1824 – 1825; Louvre Museum, France.

During the early nineteenth century exile in Corfu, the Souliote population was usually registered in official Corfiot documents as Albanesi or Suliotti, as Arvanites in onomastic catalogs for foreigners and as Alvanites (Αλβανήτες) in a divorce document by the wife of Markos Botsaris. According to Greek Corfiot historian Spyros Katsaros, he states that the Corfiot Orthodox Greek speaking population during the period of 1804–14 viewed the Souliotes as "Albanian refugees ... needing to be taught Greek". While K.D. Karamoutsos, a Corfiot historian of Souliote origin disputes this stating that the Souliotes were a mixed Graeco-Albanian population or ellinoarvanites. The Hellenic Navy Academy says that the Souliotic war banner used by Tousias Botsaris and Kitsos Tzavellas before and during the Greek War of Independence bore the inscription "descendants of Pyrrhus", the ancient Greek ruler of Epirus. Greek historian Vasso Psimouli states that the Souliotes were of Albanian origin, having first settled in Epirus in the 14th century and speaking Albanian at home despite not being isolated from their Greek neighbours.

Scottish historian George Finlay called them a branch of Chams, which American ethnologist Laurie Kain Hart interpreted as them having initially spoken Albanian. British academic Miranda Vickers calls them "Christian Albanians". The Canadian professor of Greek studies Andre Gerolymatos has described them as "branch of the southern Albanian Tosks" and "Christian Albanians of Suli". Classicist David Brewer has described them as a tribe of Albanian origin that like other Albanian tribes lived by plunder and extortion on their neighbours. American professor Nicholas Pappas stated that in modern times the Souliotes have been looked upon as Orthodox Christian Albanians who identified themselves with the Greeks. According to Pappas the overwhelming majority of the Souliotic cycle of folksongs is in Greek, which is interpreted by him as a testimony to the Greek orientation of the Souliotes. Arthur Foss says that the Souliotes were an Albanian tribe, that like other Albanian tribes, were great dandies. British historian Christopher Woodhouse describes them as an independent Greek community in the late 18th century during the resistance against Ali Pasha. Richard Clogg describes them as a warlike Albanian Christian community. Koliopoulos and Veremis have described the Souliotes as being "partly hellenized Albanian". According to Koliopoulos and Veremis, when the Albanian-speaking Souliots and other non-Greek speakers had fought in the Greek revolution, no-one thought that they were less Greek than the Greek-speakers. Trencsényi and Kopecek have inferred that they were Orthodox by faith and Albanian by origin. Fleming considers the Souliotes an Orthodox Albanian people, but also Greek-speaking. She also states that the Souliote people, who practiced a form of Orthodox Christianity and spoke Greek, were seen not as Greeks but as Albanians. Peter Bartl says that the Souliotes were an Albanian tribal community of Greek Orthodox religion. Yanni Kotsonis states that the Souliots appear a puzzling case only when contemporary notions of national belonging are projected to them and that their identity was complex, as they were "Albanians, Romioi and Christians and later Greeks as well", adopting Greekness since the Greek Revolution prevailed and endured.

According to Jim Potts, for Greek authors the issue of ethnicity and origins regarding the Souliotes is contested and various views exist regarding whether they were Albanian, Albanian-speaking Greeks, or a combination of Hellenised Christian Albanians and Greeks who had settled in northern Greece. According to the same author, the issue of the origin and ethnicity of the Souliots is very much a live and controversial issue in Greece today, and foreign writers have been equally divided.

The Souliotes were called Arvanites by Greek monolinguals, which amongst the Greek-speaking population until the interwar period, the term Arvanitis (plural: Arvanites) was used to describe an Albanian speaker regardless of their religious affiliations. Ali Pasha established an alliance with the Souliotes in 1820 by appealing to the shared ethnic Albanian origin of the Souliotes and his Muslim Albanian forces. Religiously, the Souliotes were always members of the Christian flock of the bishopric of Paramythia and belonged to the Church of Constantinople, part of the larger Greek Orthodox Church. Latter Greek official policy from the middle of the nineteenth century until the middle twentieth century, adopted a similar view: that speech was not a decisive factor for the establishment of a Greek national identity. As such, the dominant ideology in Greece considered as Greek leading figures of the Greek state and obscured the links of some Orthodox people such as Souliotes had to Albanian. 19th and 20th-century traditional historiography dealing with Souli and the Souliots selectively focused on their late eighteenth century conflicts with Ottoman officials, ignoring the past of the Souliot society, providing a distorted image of the relation of Souliots with their surroundings and presenting their military skills as a racial characteristic. Greek historian Constantine Paparrigopoulos (1815–1891) stated that the Souliotes were "a mixture of Greeks and Hellenized Albanians" while "the Albanian tribe fortified the most noble the combatitive spirit of the Greek, and the Greek inspired in the Albanian the most noble sentiments of love of one's country, love of learning and the rule of law".

== Souliotes in literature and art ==
The image of Souliotes in art and literature is capacious. They were at times depicted as remote from European culture, exotic and simple mountaineers as proposed in orientalized prototypes by Lord Byron and later by various British poets who remained under the influence of the former. In the works of the philhellenes, Souliotes and their place were often presented according to the most common 19th-century literary cliché: romanticized and sentimentalized. The scope of the works about the Souliotes was focused on the Greek Revolution, but was not limited to it. As such the philhellenic discourse conceived in this way includes any kind of cultural activity: literature belle-lettres and writings of any kind, visual arts, design (decorations and household articles), music, theater, spectacles and organized events.

The romantic image of the wild, exotic Souliotes that Byron proposed in the second canto of his narrative poem Childe Harold's Pilgrimage (1812) influenced especially the Western image of Souli, while the Greek tradition was to some extent resistant to Byronic trends. Byronism also created a separate thread in the English tradition of imaging Souli, while another one was the outbreak of the Greek Revolution. As a result of Byron's poetic refashioning of Albania as a "wild" landscape in Childe Harold's Pilgrimage, travelogues from the early 19th century record a series of representations of the Souliots, already known as invincible warriors. One of the most impressive of these images was a watercolour, a creation of British architect Charles Robert Cockerell, which was incorporated in 1820 in a book by Thomas Smart Hughes. This depiction of armed mountaineers in a fierce landscape, supposedly encapsulating their warrior qualities, was massively reproduced in the 19th century, symbolizing Romanticism's Orientalist take of the heroic yet savage Other.

Rigas Feraios in his patriotic poem, Thourios (1797), mentioned the gallantry of the Souliotes and the Maniotes when he called on the Greeks to take up arms against the Ottomans.

In 1818 at the Greek quarter of Odessa a ballet performance was organized under the name "The Soulios at Jannina".

Theater plays and poems were produced during and soon after the Greek Revolution of 1821 for the Souliotes in general, and for certain heroes or events, such as Markos Botsaris or the Dance of Zalongo.

The Souliotic cycle of folksongs comprises traditional songs in Greek and Albanian. At 1824 the first collection of folk material from Souli was published by Claude Charles Fauriel as part of his first collective work about Greek folk songs. In this work Fauriel presents various songs from the region together with descriptions about the correspondent historic events. In 1852 Spyridon Zambelios published the collection Folk Songs of Greece. The Greek folk songs are mostly compiled from the Ionian Islands, and many of them are about Souli and the struggles of the Souliotes against the Ottoman Turks. In 1878 Thimi Mitko published a collection of Albanian folk material in his Alvanikē melissa — Bleta Shqiptare (Greek: Αλβανική Μέλισσα - The Albanian Bee), which included lyric poems of heroic songs in southern Albanian dialect, including of the heroes of Souli; the Song of Marko Boçari being among them.

The Souliotes became the main topic in the works of several Greek poets: Andreas Kalvos, Iakovos Polylas, Christos Christovasilis, Aristotelis Valaoritis.

== Legacy ==
At the revolt of 1866–1869 in Crete and the holocaust of Arkadi the Greek military leader Panos Koronaios stated the determination of the Cretan rebels by saying that "Souli lives again in the Arkadi".

During the Axis occupation of Greece (1941–1944) female resistance leader, Lela Karagianni, named her organization "women of Zalongo" and her members "present-day Souliotisses". Also, imprisoned female resistance fighters before their execution by Axis troops used to sing the Song of Zalonggo.

== See also ==
- Mandritsa

== Bibliography ==
- Ασδραχάς, Σπύρος (1964). "Σουλιώτικα σημειώματα" (PDF). Επιθεώρηση Τέχνης (110): 174–185. = Ασδραχάς, Σπύρος (2019). "Σουλιώτικα σημειώματα". Πρωτόγονη επανάσταση: Αρματολοί και κλέφτες (18ος-19ος αι.). Athens: Εκδόσεις Ελληνικού Ανοικτού Πανεπιστημίου.
- Augustinos, Olga (1994). French odysseys: Greece in French travel literature from the Renaissance to the romantic era. Johns Hopkins University Press. ISBN 9780801846168.
- Balta, Evangelia; Oğuz, Mustafa; Yaşar, Filiz (2011). "The Ethnic and Religious Composition of Ottoman Thesprotia in the Fifteenth to Seventeenth Centuries". Thesprotia Expedition II: Environment and settlement patterns (PDF). Papers and monographs of the Finnish Institute at Athens. Vol. XVI. pp. 347–389.
- Διακάκης, Αντώνης (2019). Το Μεσολόγγι στο 1821: Πόλεμος, οικονομία, πολιτική, καθημερινή ζωή. Athens: Ασίνη.
  - Diakakis, Antonios (2017). The city of Missolonghi during the revolution of 1821: war, economy, politics, everyday life (Thesis). doi:10.12681/eadd/45947. hdl:10442/hedi/45947.
- Fleming, K. E. (2014). The Muslim Bonaparte: Diplomacy and Orientalism in Ali Pasha's Greece. Princeton University Press. ISBN 978-1-4008-6497-3.
- Hart, Laurie Kain (Feb 1999), "Culture, Civilization, and Demarcation at the Northwest Borders of Greece", American Ethnologist, 26 (1), Blackwell Publishing: 196–220, doi:10.1525/ae.1999.26.1.196
- Janion, Ewa Roza (2015). Imaging Suli: Interactions Between Philhellenic Ideas and Greek Identity Discourse. Peter Lang Edition. ISBN 9783631669914.
- Koliopoulos, John S. (1987). Brigands with a Cause: Brigandage and Irredentism in Modern Greece 1821–1912. Oxford: Clarendon Press. ISBN 0-19-822863-5.
- Kostavasilis, Konstantinos (2002). Installations of refuges from Epirus and Thessaly in independent Greece 1832-1862 [Εγκαταστάσεις Ηπειρωτών και Θεσσαλών προσφύγων στο ελεύθερο κράτος 1832-1862] (PDF) (Thesis). University of Ioannina. doi:10.12681/eadd/23070.
- Κοτσώνης, Γιάννης (2020). Η Ελληνική Επανάσταση και οι αυτοκρατορίες: Η Γαλλία και οι Έλληνες, 1797-1830. Athens: Αλεξάνδρεια.
- Lafe, Genc (2014). "La questione irrisolta della Çamëria nella complessità dei rapporti grecoalbanesi". Palaver. 3 (2). University of Salento. ISSN 2280-4250.
- Mazower, Mark (2021). The Greek Revolution and the Making of Modern Europe. Penguin Press. ISBN 9780698163980.
- Murawska-Muthesius, Katarzyna (2021). "Mountains and Palikars". Imaging and Mapping Eastern Europe: Sarmatia Europea to Post-Communist Bloc. Routledge. ISBN 9781351034401.
- Nikolopoulou, Kalliopi (2013). Tragically Speaking On the Use and Abuse of Theory for Life. Lincoln: UNP – Nebraska Paperback. ISBN 9780803244870.
- Nußberger, Angelika; Stoppel, Wolfgang (2001), Minderheitenschutz im östlichen Europa (Albanien) (PDF) (in German), Universität Köln, archived from the original (PDF) on 2016-03-03
- Pappas, Nicholas Charles (1982). Greeks in Russian Military Service in the Late Eighteenth and Early Nineteenth Centuries. Stanford University.
- Ψιμούλη, Βάσω (1995). Σούλι και Σουλιώτες: Οικονομικά, κοινωνικά και δημογραφικά δεδομένα. Διδακτορική διατριβή. Ιόνιο Πανεπιστήμιο. Τμήμα Ιστορίας. Athens.
- Ψιμούλη, Βάσω (2002). "Σούλι και Σουλιώτες. Ο τόπος και οι άνθρωποι". In Βασίλης Παναγιωτόπουλος (ed.). Η οθωμανική κυριαρχία, 1770-1821. Πολιτική πραγματικότητα - Οικονομική και κοινωνική οργάνωση. Ιστορία του Νέου Ελληνισμού 1770-2000. Athens: Ελληνικά Γράμματα. pp. 227–256.
- Ψιμούλη, Βάσω Δ. (2006). Σούλι και Σουλιώτες. Ιστορία και Πολιτική (4th ed.). Athens: Βιβλιοπωλείον της Εστίας.
  - Psimuli, Vaso Dh. (2016). Suli dhe suljotët [Souli and the Souliots]. Toena. ISBN 9789928205728.
- Ψιμούλη, Βάσω (2010). Βασίλης Παναγιωτόπουλος (ed.). Μάρκος Μπότσαρης. Ιστορική Βιβλιοθήκη - Οι Ιδρυτές της Νεότερης Ελλάδας. Athens: Τα Νέα.
- Βάσω Ψιμούλη (22 November 2021) [October 2021]. "Σουλιώτες: από ανυπότακτοι ορεσίβιοι, μαχητές της Ελληνικής Επανάστασης. Α' μέρος". The Books' Journal (123): 34–41.
- Ψιμούλη, Βάσω (2021). "Σουλιώτες: από ανυπότακτοι ορεσίβιοι, μαχητές της Ελληνικής Επανάστασης B' μέρος". The Books' Journal (124): 34–40.
- Potts, Jim (2010). "VI". The Ionian Islands and Epirus: A Cultural History. Landscapes of the Imagination. Oxford University Press, US. p. 186 159. ISBN 978-0199754168.
- Potts, Jim (2014). "The Souliots in Souli and Corfu and the strange case of Photos Tzavellas". In Hirst, Anthony; Sammon, Patrick (eds.). The Ionian Islands: Aspects of Their History and Culture. Cambridge Scholars Publishing. ISBN 9781443862783.
- Roudometof, Victor (2001), Nationalism, globalization, and orthodoxy: the social origins of ethnic conflict in the Balkans, Greenwood Publishing Group, 2001, ISBN 978-0-313-31949-5
- Skendi, Stavro (1954). Albanian and South Slavic Oral Epic Poetry. Philadelphia: American Folklore Society. ISBN 9780527010966. OCLC 3794368.
- Skiotis, Dennis (1976). "The Greek Revolution: Ali Pasha's Last Gamble" (PDF). Hellenism and the First Greek War of Liberation (1821–1830): Continuity and Change. University of York, Faculty of Liberal Arts & Professional Studies: 97–109. Archived from the original (PDF) on 17 November 2015.
- Schwandner-Sievers, Stephanie; Fischer, Bernd Jürgen (2002). Albanian Identities: Myth and History. Indiana University Press. ISBN 0-253-34189-2.
- Tsiamalos, Demetrios (2007). Social and revolutionary awareness of the armed cohorts of Roumeli during the 1821 revolution (Thesis). University of Panteion. doi:10.12681/eadd/16242. hdl:10442/hedi/16242.
- Tzakis, Dionysis (2021). "Epirus". In Paschalis M. Kitromilides and Constantinos Tsoukalas (ed.). The Greek revolution : a critical dictionary. Cambridge, MA: The Belknap Press of Harvard University Press. pp. 208–218.
- Vranousis, L.; Sfyroeras, V. (1997). "From the Turkish Conquest to the Beginning of the Nineteenth Century". Epirus, 4000 Years of Greek History and Civilization. Ekdotike Athenon. ISBN 9789602133712.
- Zervas, Theodore G. (2016). Formal and informal education during the rise of Greek nationalism: learning to be Greek. New York: Springer. ISBN 9781137484154.
