= Souliotic songs =

A cycle of folk songs pertaining to the Souliotes and mainly to their wars against the Turks and the Albanians of Ali Pasha in 18th and early 19th century.

The first collection of Souliotic songs was published by the French philologist and historian Claude Fauriel in 1824 in the 1st volume of his “Chants populaires de la Grèce moderne”, a cornerstone for French and Greek laography.

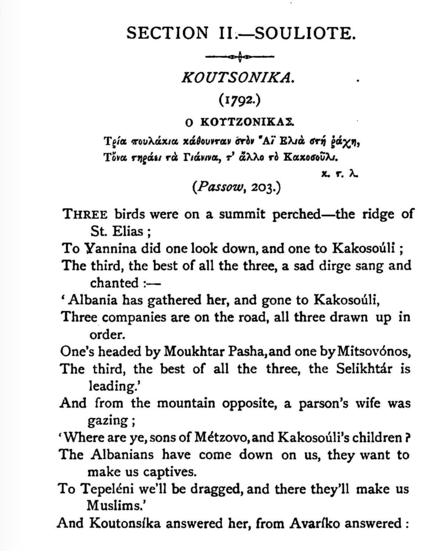
A Souliotic song published in English (Lucy M.J. Garnett, 1888)

This was the first major collection of Greek folk songs (demotika) ever published in a European language. The songs are given in the original Greek and in French translation. Apart from the songs, this publication includes an extensive history of Souli and its wars (pages 223–283).

A footnote by Fauriel in p. 283 indicates that the collection was completed before the death of Markos Botsaris, i.e. before 1823. In other parts of the “Chants populaires” Fauriel published other folk songs directly related to the Souliotes, e.g. “The death of Kitsos Botsaris”, and “The Deliberation of Ali Pasha” (vol. 2, 1825, pp. 343–353).

Fauriel heard these songs from Greek refugees in Venice and Trieste.

After Fauriel many Greek and European authors published more Souliotic songs, as Souliotes continued fighting in the Greek Revolution which ended in 1829. In 1844 D.H.Sanders published some of the songs and their translation in German.
In 1852 the Greek historian Sp. Zambelios included a dozen of Souliotic songs in his collection of Greek folk songs. Among them was one for the death of Markos Botsaris (p. 644, song No 57). Souliotic songs translated into English were published in 1888 by Lucy M.J. Garnett.
