= Delibaş =

Delibaş, may be transliterated as Delibash, is a Turkish surname, derived from Turkish deli baş meaning "crazy head".

- Emirhan Delibaş (born 2003), Turkish footballer
- Orhan Delibaș, Turkish boxer

== See also ==
- Delibaş Rebellion
- Delibašić, surname derived from this nickname
