= Lambros Koutsonikas =

Greek general and fighter

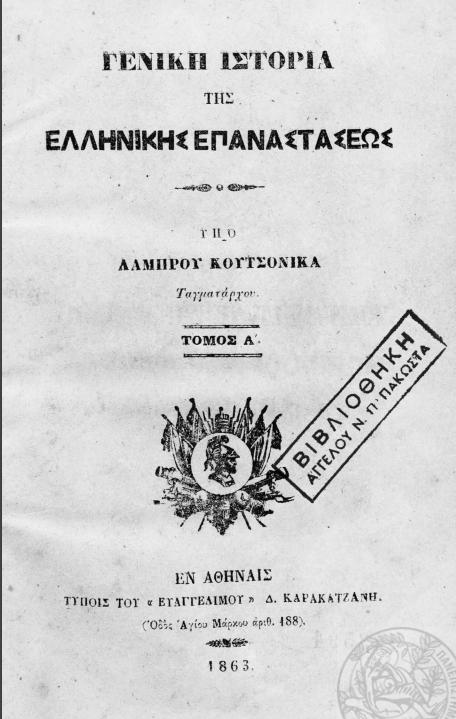
Title page of the General History of the Greek Revolution by Lambros Koutsonikas, Athens 1863.

Lambros Koutsonikas (Greek: Λάμπρος Κουτσονίκας, 1799 – 2 June 1879) was a Greek general and fighter of the Greek Revolution of 1821, army officer and amateur historian of the Revolution.

== Biography ==
He was the son of Yiannos, from the Souliot Koutsonikas clan. His grandfather Nikos, his father and his brother Thanassis were killed in 1804 in a battle against the Albanians of Ali Pasha of Yanina at the Seltsou monastery in Tzoumerka. Lambros being a child that time, together with his mother and brother, were taken captives by Ali pasha's bands. Later, Lambros fought as head of an armed unit during the Greek Revolution of 1821. During the Revolution, he served in the Greek army and was promoted to the rank of pentakosiarchos (leader of 500 men). He died in 1879 in Agrinio.

== Works ==
He authored the General History of the Greek Revolution (Γενική Ιστορία της Ελληνικής Επαναστάσεως), published in 1863–64 in Athens. The first volume of his work contains a large chapter on the history of Souli and the Souliotes, which is one of the few primary sources on the subject, written by a Souliote. Koutsonikas, based on oral tradition, claims that Souliotes resisted the Ottoman invasion since 15th century and they remained free and independent till early 19th century, and were the first who revolted in 1820.

The name of his clan is mentioned in some of the Souliotic Songs, initially published by Claude Fauriel in 1823 and republished later by others.
