= Buljubašić =

Buljubašić is a Bosnian, Croatian and Serbian surname derived from the Ottoman military rank Boluk-bashi.

== Notable people with the surname ==
- Edib Buljubašić (born 1964), Bosnian army officer
- Iva Buljubašić (born 1988), Croatian economist
- Ivan Buljubašić (born 1987), Croatian water polo player
- Ivana Buljubašić Srb (born 1990), Croatian literary critic
- Mate Buljubašić, Croatian folk poet and Gusle player
- Sabrina Buljubašić (born 1988), Bosnian footballer

== See also ==
- Boluk-bashi, military rank
- Bölükbaşı, Turkish surname
