= Alipashiad =

19th century epic poem by Haxhi Shehreti

The Alipashiad or Alipashias (Greek: Αληπασιάδα or Αληπασιάς) is an early 19th century epic poem written in Greek by the Muslim Albanian Haxhi Shehreti. The work is inspired by and named after Ali Pasha, the Ottoman Albanian ruler of the increasingly independent Pashalik of Yanina, describing, in heroic style, his life and military campaigns.

== Background ==
"Όλος ο κόσμος γιούρτισε κιόλα τα βιλαέτια
Και φέρνουν στον Αλή Πασιά φλωριά με τα σεπέτια
Ώρα την ώρα Αλή Πασιάς ακόμη πλειό βαραίνει.
Το όνομά του ακούσθηκε στο Ήντε στο Γεμένι,
Σεφτά ρηγάτα Φράγγικα ακούσθη το ‘νομά του,
Κανένας ως τα σήμερα δεν στάθηκε μπροστά του.

Translation:

All the world makes festivities, and all the districts:
They bring Ali Pasha golden coins in coffers.
Hour by hour Ali Pasha weighs more heavy:
His name is heard in Hindi and in Yemen.
In the Seven Frank Kingdoms his name is heard;
And no one on this day had stood before him."

The Alipashiad was composed by Haxhi Shehreti, who was a Muslim Albanian and Ali's personal balladeer, and who composed this work in Greek, considering it a more prestigious language in which to praise his master. William Leake says that Shehreti had no Greek education and knew only the colloquial Greek of Albania and its borders. The language of the poem, therefore (according to Leake) represents the local vulgar dialect of the Greek language.

Despite the predominance of the Greek language as the language of Orthodox Christian education and culture, sometimes a form of cultural hybridity emerged in a number of 18th and early 19th century Albanian language documents, which were written using the Greek script. This was due to the fact that the Orthodox church, unlike the Catholic one, "was never to be convinced of the utility of writing in the vernacular as a means of converting the masses". Hence Greek script or language was used in various works of Albanian authors, both Christian and Muslim. An example of the latter is the composer of the Alipashiad.

The poem provides evidence about a period when Lord Byron, Christopoulos, Ioannis Vilaras, Ioannis Kolettis, Georgios Sakellarios and Athanasios Psalidas were among the scholarly, artistic and cultural elite of Ioannina.

== Language ==
The poem is written in a modern demotic Greek language and contains some dialectical interference and foreign expressions. The Greek language used was based on the contemporary (vernacular) idioms of Delvine and Ioannina both places where the author lived. Another decisive factor that influenced the language of composition was the scholarly Greek language which was the language used in the court of Ioannina during the time he served Ali Pasha.

== Content ==
Historically, the Alipashiad contains the unusual feature of being written from the Muslim point of view. Apart from narrating Ali's adventures, the poem describes the complex Pashalik of Yanina, as well as the activities of the local mercenaries (Armatoles) and brigands (Klephts) that Ali had to deal with.

In the epic poem, Ali's war against the Souliotes is formalistically presented as a religious conflict, as the author refers to the Orthodox rebels as the Din Diijman "enemies of the faith". However, historical evidence rather indicates that the war was waged by Ali as a personal revenge against Souliotes. Indeed Ali didn't care for the territories of Souli, but he resented ongoing refusal of the Souliotes to submit to his rule. Moreover, Souliotes' religious identity as Christians held no particular relevance for Ali, as from a cultural perspective he ought to have favored them as being of Albanian descent like himself, rather than Greek, Vlach, or Turkish.

== Date and later publication ==
The Alipashiad consists of 15,000 lines and was written in installments in the first years of the 19th century, when Ali Pasha was at his height as the powerful and semi-independent ruler of the Pashalik of Yanina. A copy of the poem was found by the British antiquarian and topographer, William Martin Leake, in 1817. In 1835 he published 4,500 lines of the Alipashiad. The entire poem was published by the Greek historian Constantine Sathas in his volume Historical Disquisitions in 1870.
