= Delibašić =

Delibašić is a South Slavic patronymic surname, derived from Turkish deli baş meaning "crazy head". Notable people with the surname include:

- Andrija Delibašić (1981–2025), Montenegrin footballer
- Mirza Delibašić (1954–2001), Bosnian basketball player
- Pavle Delibašić (born 1978), Serbian footballer
- Selma Delibašić (born 1980), Bosnian-Swedish female basketball player
- Slađa Delibašić (born 1968), Serbian pop singer and dancer

== See also ==
- Delibaş
