= Bölükbaşı (surname) =

Bölükbaşı is a Turkish given name for males and a surname. The Albanian variant is Bylykbashi. Notable people with the surname include:

== Surname ==
- Bülent Bölükbaşı, Turkish footballer
- İbrahim Bölükbaşı (born 1990), Turkish wrestler
- Mehmet Bölükbaşı, Turkish footballer
- Osman Bölükbaşı, Turkish politician and political party leader
- Rıza Tevfik Bölükbaşı, Turkish philosopher, poet, politician and a community leader
- Cem Bölükbaşı, Turkish racing driver
- Zerrin Bölükbaşı, Turkish sculptor

== See also ==
- Bölükbaşı, Military rank
