= Ivana Bašić (artist) =

Serbian artist

Ivana Bašić (Serbian Cyrillic: Ивана Башић; born 1986 in Belgrade) is a Serbian artist living and working in New York.

Bašić specializes in sculpture blending various materials, including wax, glass, stainless steel, alabaster and oil paint , as well as immaterial elements such as torque, breath, weight, rigidity and pressure. Her work addresses the vulnerability and transformation of the human form and its matter

Bašić’s work has been included in shows curated by Nicolas Bourriaud and at Andrea Rosen Gallery, as well as in Chrissie Iles’ milestone exhibition Dreamlands: Immersive Cinema and Art, 1905-2016 Her work is in the permanent collection of the Whitney Museum of American Art.

== Professional history ==
=== Solo shows ===
- Ivana Bašić 'Throat wanders down the blade..', Annka Kultys Gallery, London (2016)

=== Group shows ===
- Primary Detectives, Marlborough Contemporary, London (2019)
- Unquestionable Optimism at the Barn, Johannes Vogt Gallery, East Hampton (2017)
- Group Show '] [' (organised with Damian Griffiths), Annka Kultys Gallery, London (2017)
- Group Show 'Zero Zero' (curated by Molly Soda, Arvida Byström, Ada Rajkovic), Annka Kultys Gallery, London (2016)
- In the Flesh, Part II: Potential Adaptations curated by Courtney Malick, Nina Johnson, Miami (2016)

=== Fair booths ===
- Michael Valinsky + Gabrielle Jensen at SPRING/BREAK Art Show, 2016, Michael Valinsky + Gabrielle Jensen (2016)
