= Joseph Cartwright (artist) =

English painter

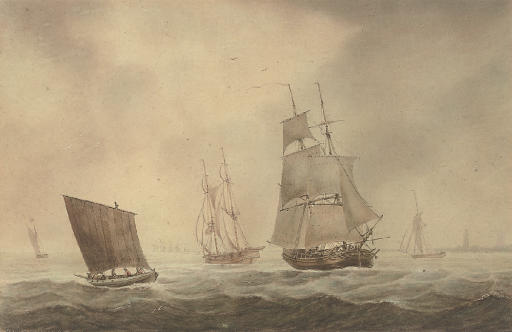
Trading Brigs and other shipping in the Channel (1819)

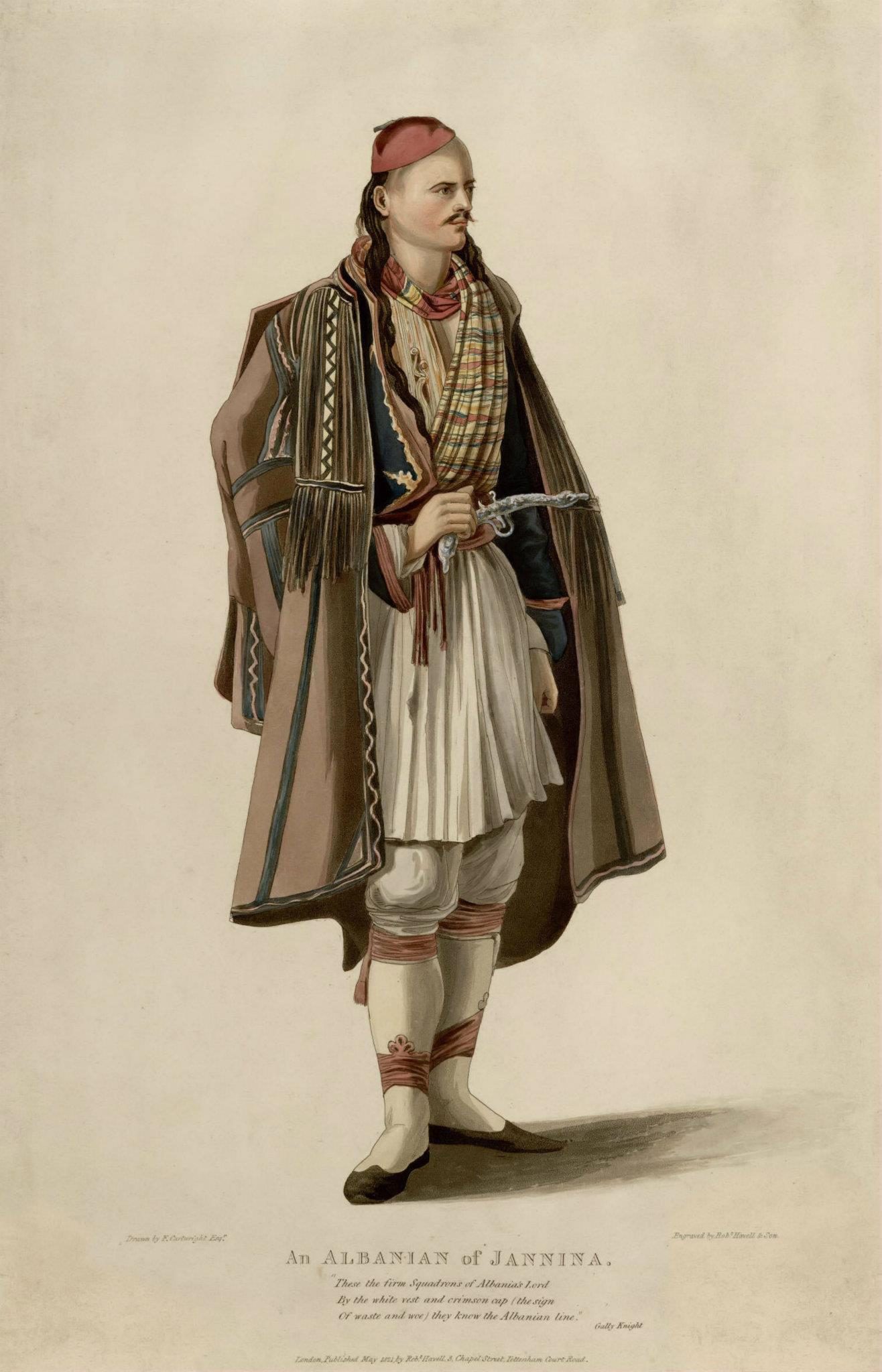
Albanian of Janina

Joseph Cartwright (1789? – 16 January 1829) was an English marine painter.

== Life and work ==
Cartwright was a native of Dawlish in Devon, and worked for the navy in a civilian capacity. When the Ionian Islands came into the possession of the British sometime after the Treaty of Paris in 1815, he was appointed paymaster-general of the forces at Corfu, a position he held for some years. The nature of his post gave him many opportunities for making sketches of those islands and the neighbouring coast of Greece.

On his return to England he published a volume entitled Views in the Ionian Islands, and from then on devoted himself to art, and especially to painting marine subjects and naval engagements. He exhibited many pictures at the Royal Academy, the British Institution, and the Society of British Artists, and obtained a great reputation in his particular field. In 1825 he was elected a member of the Society of British Artists, and in 1828 was appointed marine painter to H.R.H. the Duke of Clarence, Lord High Admiral of England and future King of England, William IV.

Cartwright died at his apartments at Charing Cross, London on 16 January 1829, aged about forty.

Among his main works were: The Burning of L'Orient at the Battle of the Nile, The Battle of Algiers, The Battle of Trafalgar, The Port of Venice at Carnival Time, HMS Greyhound and HMS Harrier engaging a Dutch Squadron in the Java Seas, Frigates becalmed in the Ionian Channel and A Waterspout off the Coast of Albania.
