= Boluk-bashi =

Ottoman officer rank equivalent to captain

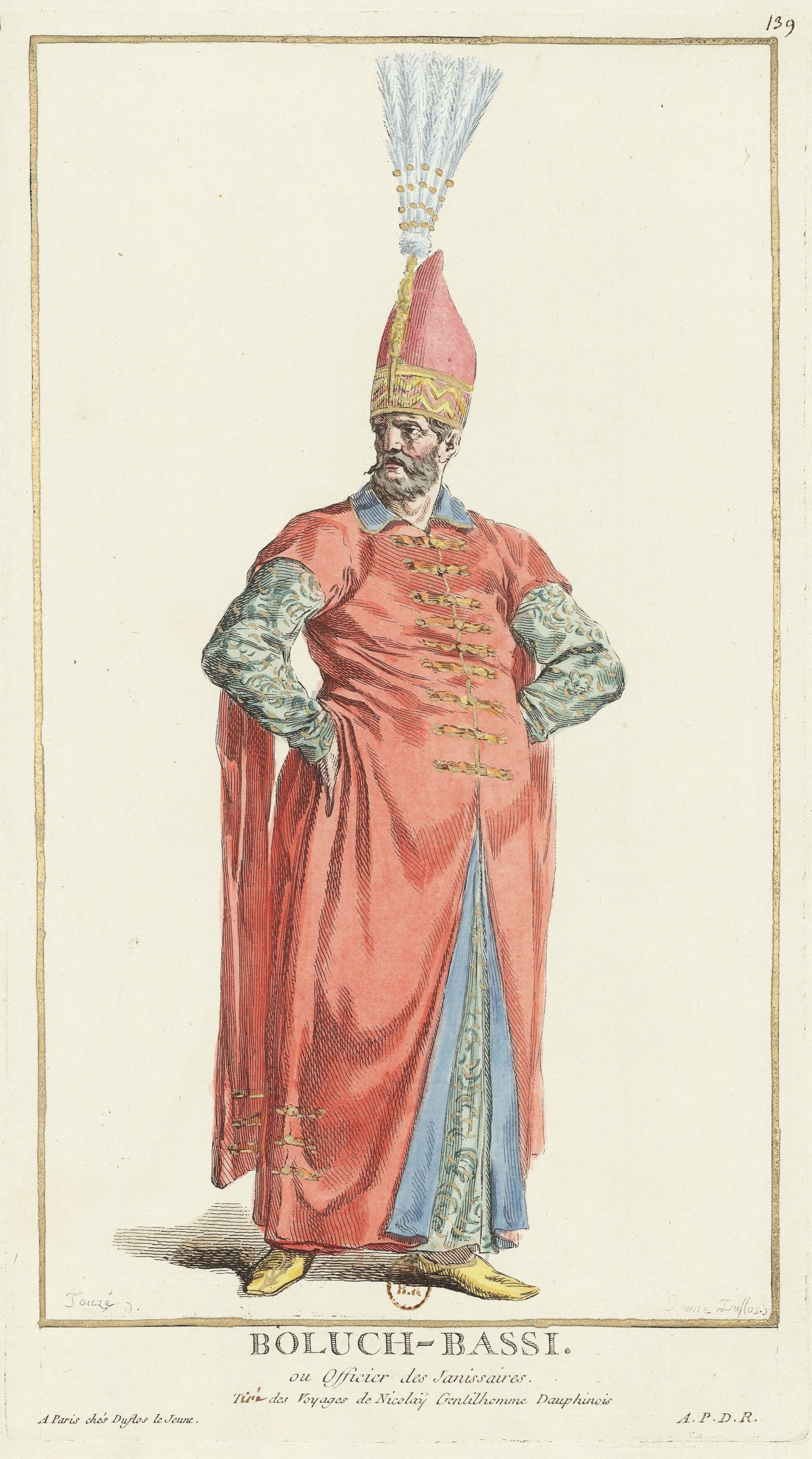
Janissary boluk-bashi (1780).

Boluk-bashi (Ottoman Turkish: بولق باشی, Turkish: bölükbaşı, "head of [infantry] company, company captain") was an Ottoman officer rank equivalent to captain. It was replaced in the 19th century by the rank of yüzbaşı.

== Etymology ==
The word is made up of two elements, bölük ("division, group of troops", from böl, "to separate") and baş ("head"). It entered into Balkan languages such as Albanian: bylykbashi and Serbo-Croatian: buljubaša.

== Usage ==
=== Ottoman Empire ===
The bölükbaşı was an Ottoman officer rank equivalent to captain. It was used in the Janissary corps during the reign of Suleiman the Magnificent (r. 1520–66). In the 17th century the holder was in command of a bölük, a sub-division of a regiment. During the Ottoman Old Regime (1703–89) the rank translated into "captain of a squadron", commanding a bölük of the sipahi and silahdar cavalry.

It was higher than oda-bashi (lieutenant). The Ottoman reforms of Tanzimat (1839–76) saw the bölük being a company of hundred men (yüz meaning "hundred") under the commanding rank of yüzbaşı (also translated as "captain").

=== Serbs ===
The rank of buljubaša (Serbian Cyrillic: буљубаша) or buljukbaša (буљукбаша) was used by the Serbian hajduks for the commanders of a brigand četa ("company"). Among notable hajduks holding the rank that were murdered by the Dahije (renegade Janissaries) in the Slaughter of the Knezes were Janko Gagić, Gavrilo Buđevac and Mata from Lipovac. It then entered the ranks of the Revolutionary Serbian Army in the First Serbian Uprising (1804–13) as the equivalent of kapetan ("captain"). Among notable holders were Arsenije Loma, Todor Bojinović, Zeka Buljubaša, Hajduk-Veljko and Petar Dobrnjac.

=== Royal Corps of Colonial Troops ===
In the Royal Corps of Colonial Troops of the Italian Royal Army, it was known as bulucbasci and was the equivalent to the rank of sergeant.

== Notable people ==
- Iliaș Colceag (fl. 1710–1743), Ottoman Moldavian commander
- Yahya bey Dukagjini (1498–1582), Ottoman Albanian commander and poet

== See also ==
- Bölükbaşı (surname)
- Buljubašić, surname

== Sources ==
- Bodrožić, Đuro (2022). "Vojska i država: počeci moderne srpske vojske". Nacionalni Interes. 44 (2): 29–46. doi:10.22182/ni.4222022.2 (inactive 25 July 2025).
- The Encyclopaedia of Islām: A Dictionary of the Geography, Ethnography and Biography of the Muhammadan Peoples. Vol. 1. E. J. Brill. 1970.
- Gavrilović, Andra (1904). Црте из историје ослобођења Србије. Belgrade: Нздање дворске књпжаре Мпте Стајпћа у Београду. (Public Domain)
- Novaković, Stojan (1904). Ustanak na dahije 1804. U Beogradu tampano u dravnoj tampariji. (Public Domain)
