= Zlatko Bašić =

Croatian footballer

Personal information
- Date of birth: 22 September 1975 (age 51)
- Place of birth: Slavonski Brod
- Height: 1.81 m (5 ft 11 in)
- Position: Defender

Senior career*
Years	Team	Apps	(Gls)
–1998	Marsonia		
1998–2000	Rot-Weiß Oberhausen		
2000–2003	FC St. Pauli		
- Slavonija Požega
- Vinogradar

Managerial career
- 2012–2013: NK Sesvete (assistant)
- 2013–2015: NK Zagreb (assistant)
- 2015–2017: Slaven Belupo (assistant)
- 2017–2018: Hajduk Split (assistant)
- * Club domestic league appearances and goals

Zlatko Bašić (born 22 September 1975) is a Croatian professional football coach and former player who played as a defender.
