= Ioannis Trikoupis =

Greek politician

Ioannis Trikoupis (1750 in Missolonghi – 30 July 1824 in Missolonghi) was a Greek politician of the Greek War of Independence.

== Biography ==
Ioannis Trikoupis was born in 1750 in Missolonghi and was the eldest son of the seaman and local notable Matthaios Trikoupis. He attended his first general courses in his hometown, where his teacher was the famous scholar Panagiotis Palamas. Later, he studied philosophy in Ithaca, where he also learned Italian. After his studies he settled in Patras to find work. There he met the bishop of Old Patras at the time, Gabriel and in 1771 he became his secretary. In 1780, when Gabriel was elected Ecumenical Patriarch of Constantinople, he followed him there. In 1785 he returned to Missolonghi due to the desire of his father, who was the chief elder of the city. He married Alexandra Palama and together they had seven sons (Spyridon, Anastasios, Konstantinos, Nikolaos, Manthos, Apostolos and Themistoklis) and two daughters (Eirini and Maria). After his father’s death, he was elected chief elder of Missolonghi in his stead, a position he held for eight years, in part because he managed to gain the favour of Ali Pasha.

He was initiated into the Filiki Eteria, a secret organization whose purpose was to overthrow the Ottoman rule of Greece and establish an independent Greek state, by Bishop Porphyrios of Arta. Because of that, when the Greek Revolution broke out in 1821, he was elected president of the communal council of Missolonghi.

During the first siege of Missolonghi in 1822, Ioannis Trikoupis contributed to the defence of the city. On 9 November 1822, when the Senate of Western Continental Greece was established, he was elected senator and later a member of the board of the Directorate General and the three-member committee that worked as temporary substitutes for Alexandros Mavrokordatos during his absence.

Ioannis Trikoupis died on 30 July 1824 in Missolonghi. According to the announcement of his death in the newspaper Ellinika Chronika of Johann Jakob Meyer, he died of malaria.

== See also ==
- Spyridon Trikoupis
- Charilaos Trikoupis
