= Third siege of Missolonghi =

1825–26 battle of the Greek War of Independence

- Part of the Greek War of Independence
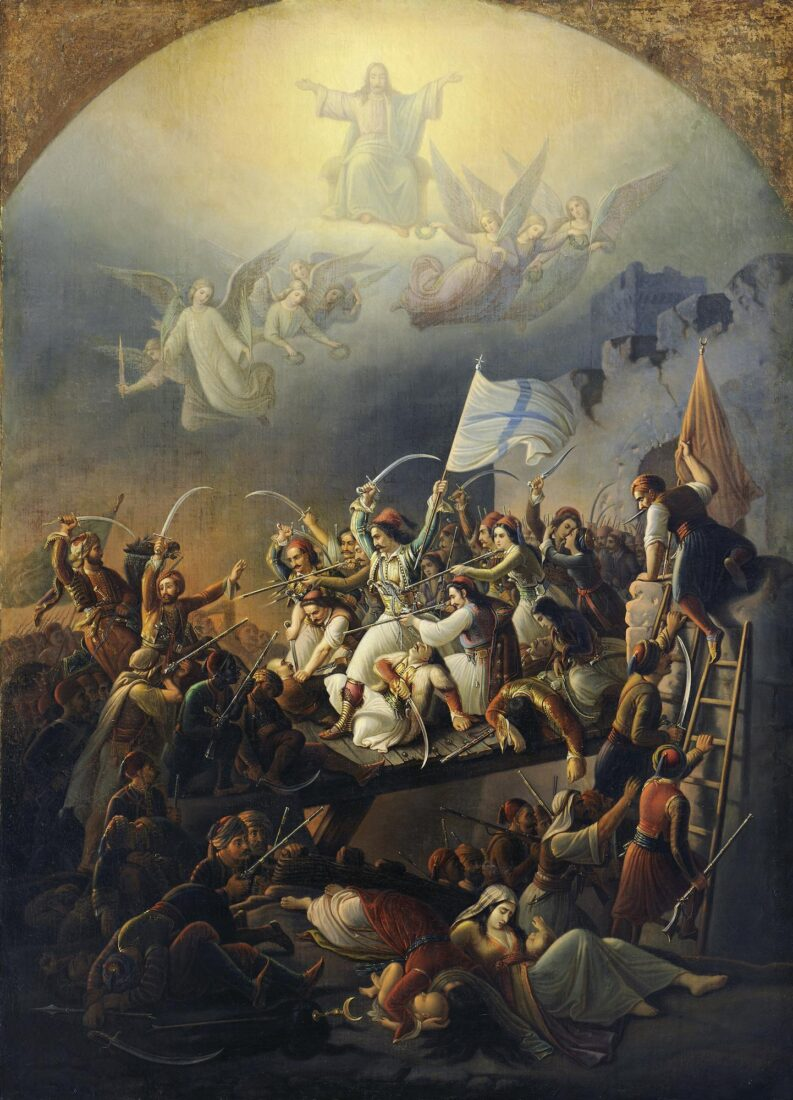
- The sortie of Missologhi by Theodore Vryzakis
Date	15 April 1825 – 10 April 1826 (11 months, 3 weeks and 5 days)
Location	Missolonghi, Sanjak of Karli-Eli, Ottoman Empire (now Aetolia-Acarnania, Greece)
Result	Ottoman–Egyptian victory; Capture of Missolonghi

Belligerents
(Greece) First Hellenic Republic: Souliot Forces	Ottoman Empire: Egypt Eyalet

Commanders and leaders
(Greece) Nikolaos Kasomoulis (Greece) Dimitrios Makris (Greece) Athanasios Razikotsikas †; Kitsos Tzavellas; Notis Botsaris	Omer Vrioni; Reşid Mehmed Pasha; Ibrahim Pasha

Strength
5,000	20,000 Ottoman regulars and Albanian Mercenaries; 15,000 Egyptians

Casualties and losses
8,000+ soldiers and civilians	Unknown

The third siege of Missolonghi (Greek: Τρίτη Πολιορκία του Μεσολογγίου, often erroneously referred to as the second siege) was fought in the Greek War of Independence, between the Ottoman Empire and the Greek rebels, from 15 April 1825 to 10 April 1826. The Ottomans had already tried and failed to capture the city in 1822 and 1823, but returned in 1825 with a stronger force of infantry and a stronger navy supporting the infantry. The Greeks held out for almost a year before they ran out of food and attempted a mass breakout, which however resulted in a disaster, with the larger part of the Greeks slain. This defeat was a key factor leading to intervention by the Great Powers who, hearing about the atrocities, felt sympathetic to the Greek cause. Their support would prove decisive in helping the Greeks win the war and gain independence.

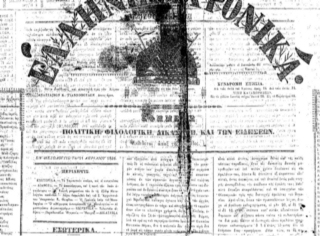
Front page (1824) of the early Greek newspaper Ellinika Chronika, published in Missolonghi and edited by Swiss philhellene Johann Jakob Meyer (de; el; ru), who was killed in the sortie.

== Background ==
Missolonghi is a town in southern Aetolia-Acarnania in western Continental Greece, located on a promontory jutting into a lagoon at the entrance of the namesake gulf. The town emerged as a fishing and trading settlement sometime in the 16th century. When the Greek War of Independence broke out in spring 1821, Missolonghi was the first place in western Greece to join the uprising, on 20 May 1822, led by the town elders, such as Athanasios Razikotsikas. With the aid of the klepht chieftain Dimitrios Makris, the nearby island of Anatoliko was also captured soon after.

Its location made it a vital bastion to the Greeks in the War of Independence: protected by a chain of small islands and its lagoon from the sea, and by a wall and the marshy terrain from the landward side, it was strategically located near the Peloponnese and the Ionian Islands. In November 1821, Alexandros Mavrokordatos established a regional government for the territories controlled by the revolutionaries in western Greece, the "Senate of Western Continental Greece".

The town's fortifications were initially limited to a ditch 2 metres (6.6 ft) wide and 1.2 metres (3.9 ft) deep, in many places filled up with rubbish, as well as by a small wall, not higher than 1 metre (3.3 ft) and in need of repair, with fourteen guns. Nevertheless, the city held out against the first Ottoman attempt to capture it in 1822. A 7,000–8,000 strong Ottoman army under Omer Vrioni and Mehmed Reshid Pasha laid siege to the city on 25 October 1822. The small Greek garrison of 500 men managed to delay the Ottomans by pretending to negotiate a surrender until the Greek fleet landed reinforcements on 8 November. The subsequent Ottoman attacks were beaten off, and the onset of winter, disease, and the attacks of other Greek forces from the rear under Georgios Karaiskakis forced the Ottoman commanders to lift the siege on 31 December 1822.

A second Ottoman attack, led by Vrioni and Mustafa Pasha of Scutari, was launched on 20 September 1823, and focused mostly on Anatoliko. Facing the onset of winter, disease, the failure of the simultaneous Ottoman operations in eastern Greece, and Greek attacks on their foraging parties, the Ottoman commanders abandoned the siege on 17 November. In April 1824, Lord Byron died in Missolonghi of an illness, adding to the fame of the city.

== Siege ==
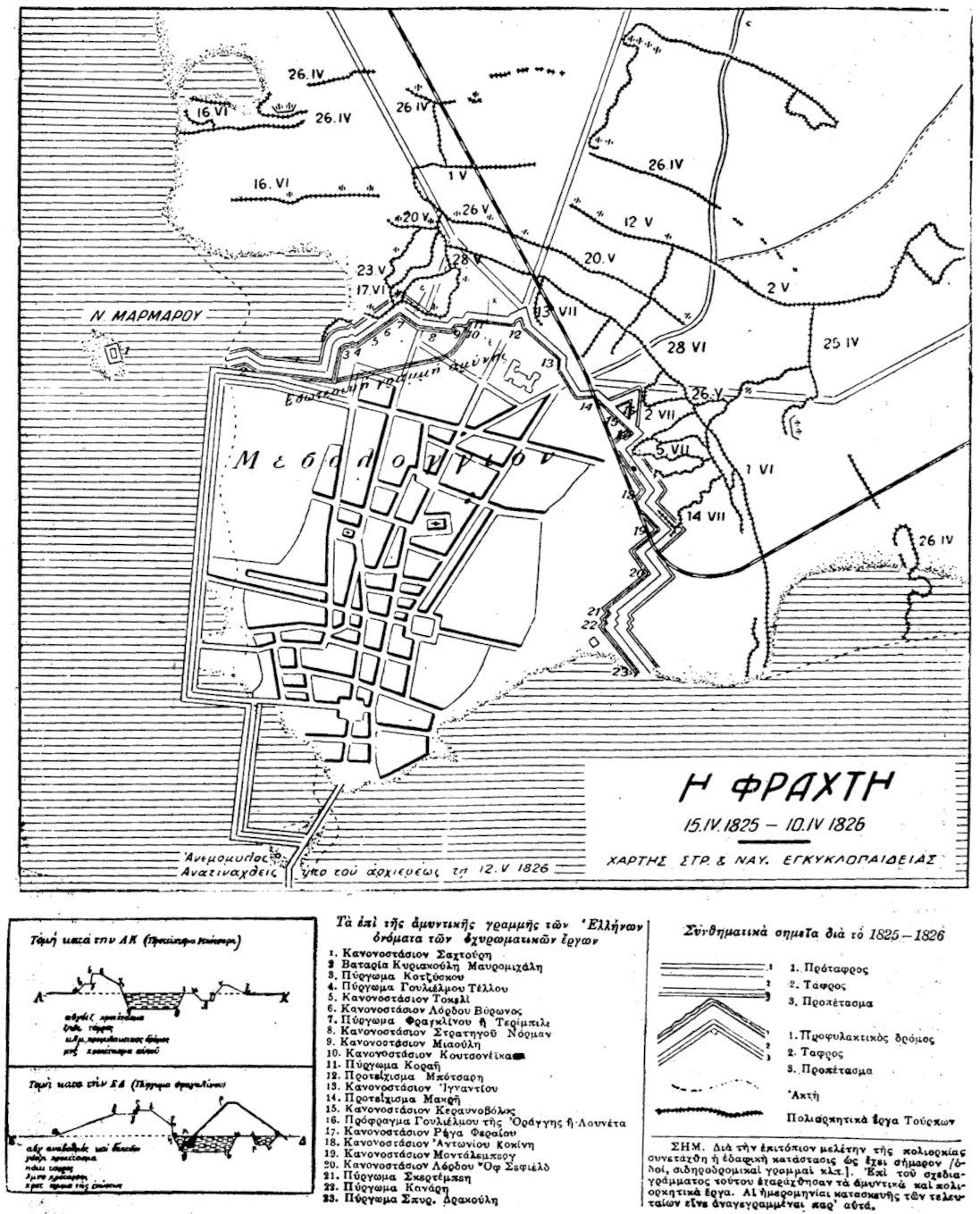
Map of Missolonghi during the siege, with the fortifications and the Ottoman siege lines (with dates). The map of the city corresponds to the 1920s.

In spring 1825, the Ottomans came to besiege the Greeks again. The Ottoman commander Reşid Mehmed Pasha was informed "Either Missolonghi falls or your head" as the Sultan would not tolerate a third failed siege. It was a common practice in the Ottoman Empire for those generals who failed the Sultan to pay the price of their failure with their lives. The location of Missolonghi was on a long spit of land surrounded by a lagoon full of islands, giving it a strong defensive position. Three islands, Marmaris, Klisova and Aitoliko controlled the entrance to the lagoon. Much of the ground on the eastern landward side was marshy and on the eastern side was a wide open plain. The town was surrounded by earthen walls, but their defences had been strengthened by a military engineer from Chios, Michael Kokkinis who had built a series of 17 bastions containing 48 guns and 4 mortars, forming triangular projections so the defender could bring interlocking fire on any attacker. Kokkinis named the bastions after heroes for liberty, naming them after Benjamin Franklin, William of Orange, Tadeusz Kościuszko, Lord Byron, Karl von Normann-Ehrenfels, Markos Botsaris, Skanderbeg, Lord Sheffield, and so on. The defenders were some 3,000 men, most Greek, but a few were Italian, Swiss and German philhellenes. The Greeks were nominally led by a committee of three, but the dominant personality was a Souliot captain Notis Botsaris. The Ottoman forces were 20,000, of which 8,000 were professional soldiers, the rest Albanian irregulars while some 4,000 were Greeks enslaved to work on building the Ottoman entrenchments. Reshid promptly put his Greek slaves to work building a series of trenches around Missolonghi that gradually brought his men closer to the town, reaching up to 100 yards of Missolonghi. Reshid was at the end of long and tenuous supply lines and simply did not have enough cannonballs to knock down the walls of Missolonghi. Whenever a breach was made, attempts to storm it were beaten off with ferocious counter-attacks while all the citizens of Missolonghi, men and women worked together to fill the breaches during the night.

In August 1825, the Ottomans began building a mound, so they could bring down fire on Missolonghi's defenders. From the mound, the Greeks were forced out of the Franklin battery, but dug a ditch with a rampart behind, which stopped the Ottomans from advancing too deep into Missolonghi. The Ottomans began building a second mound, but the Greeks destroyed it via a mine full of explosives at the end of August. In the course of night raids, the Greeks dismantled the first mound and used its soil to repair holes in their wall. The first mound was finally destroyed by a mine in September 1825. The Ottomans also attempted to mine the walls, but proved to be inept at this. In September 1825, the Greeks dug a mine under the Ottoman camp, in which they exploded a mine. Believing the Greeks were attempting a sortie, the Ottomans gathered around the hole in the earth, at which point the Greeks exploded a second and much larger mine killing many, with one Greek remembering: “We too were terrified and fell to the ground…legs, feet, heads, half bodies, thighs, hands and entrails fell on us and on the enemy”.

Greek Admiral Andreas Miaoulis was able to bring in supplies, so the Ottoman attempt to starve the city into surrender came to nothing. Georgios Karaiskakis, the leading captain of the Roumeli was an enemy of Botsaris, and provided little support for the besieged. In October 1825, the heavy rains turned the Ottoman lines into a quagmire and, feeling confident of victory, the women and children whom Admiral Miaoulis had taken to the island of Kalamos for their safety returned in the fall. One of the Greek captains Dhimitros Makris got married, which led the Greeks to get drunk and fire off blank cartridges all night at the wedding party; in the morning the Turks shouted over the walls to ask what the noise was all about, the Greeks shouted back “It's the general's wedding”. The Turks replied “Long life to them! May they be happy!”. Despite the conflict, the two sides would fraternize and talk like old friends during truces. During the truce to celebrate the wedding, the engineer Kokkinis was allowed to visit the Ottoman camp, which he described “as earthworks with no coherence, constructions with no logic, and in short by any reckoning a muddle and a hotchpotch…The whole thing is unbelievable-but it's Turkish”.

In the fall of 1825, Mohammed Ali the Great, the more or less independent wali (governor) of Egypt sent a new fleet of 135 ships, which consisted of Algerian, Tunisian, Turkish and Egyptian ships to join the expeditionary force already in Greece under his son Ibrahim Pasha. Reinforced with 10,000 new Egyptian troops, Ibrahim Pasha marched through the Peloponnese, destroying everything in his path and joined the siege in January. The High Commissioner of the Ionian Islands, Sir Frederick Adam, tried to make both forces sign a treaty, but his efforts were unsuccessful. The Greek Admiral Miaoulis kept breaking through the Ottoman naval blockade and bringing in supplies. The commander of the Ottoman forces, Reşid Mehmed Pasha, was joined early 1826 by Ibrahim Pasha who crossed the Gulf of Corinth. Ibrahim Pasha had also brought with him many cannons and artillery shells, and on 24 February 1826, the Egyptians began a fierce bombardment of the city. Over the course of three days, the Egyptians fired 5,256 cannonballs and 3,314 mortar shells into the city, destroying much of it. The Greeks defeated three Egyptian attempts to storm the city in hand-to-hand fighting where many men and women stood shoulder to shoulder against the Egyptians.

At this point, Ibrahim Pasha decided to starve the city into submission. To do that, he needed to take the islands in the lagoon. Ibrahim had a fleet of shallow draught boats numbering 82 and together with five other boats carrying cannons that served as floating batteries. On 9 March 1826, the island of Vasiladhi commanded by the Italian philhellene Pasquale Iacommuzzi consisting of 34 artillerymen and 27 infantry was attacked by 1,000 Egyptians under Hussein Bey. After a day's fighting, Vasiladhi fell. On 12 March, the Egyptians attacked the islands of Dolmas and Poros, which surrendered after coming under a heavy bombardment. With the islands under Egyptian control, supplies from the sea could no longer reach the city. When the Ottomans captured the fortress island of Anatolikon, Miaoulis was not able to bring in supplies.

Ibrahim Pasha now demanded the city surrender, with the people being given the choice of being sold into slavery in the Ottoman Empire or converting to Islam, a demand the Greeks rejected. On 6 April 1826, Reshid Pasha led some 2,000 Albanian and Turkish troops onto the island of Klisova, but the Ottoman troops got stuck in the mud as they landed, making them easy targets for Greek snipers with Reshid Pasha himself wounded. After the failure of the first assault, some 3,000 Egyptians under Hussein Bey made a second attempt later that same morning, but were again shot down by the Greeks in the earth banks. The Greeks, knowing that the Egyptians were lost without their officers, concentrated their fire on their leaders and by killing Hussein Bey reduced the Egyptian ranks to chaos. Ibrahim Pasha tried to motivate his soldiers by screaming in Arabic that this was a jihad, so the Egyptians should not fear "martyrdom" for Allah, and that they were free to rape any Greek Christian who crossed their path. Despite Ibrahim's call for jihad, the Egyptians were unable to get past the earth banks and the assault was finally called off. One Greek Nikolaos Kasomoulis, serving as a secretary to one of the captains described the scene the next day:

”The lagoon was covered with corpses a gunshot distance away, and they were drifting like rubbish by the shore…one could see bodies floating all round, about 2,500 of them, apart from those our boatman had captured and killed at dawn when they cried out for help. Some, 2,500 guns had been found, some with bayonets and some without, plus bandoliers and innumerable belts, from which the Greeks made braces. I made a pair myself, and so did everyone else. But the clothes were worthless, apart from those of a few officers; the Greeks got no booty from these and were much displeased”

However, with the Ottomans guarding the islands in the entrance to the lagoon, Admiral Miaoulis could not longer bring in supplies of food and soon the people were starving.

== Sortie ==
The situation soon became desperate for the defenders with the people starving. The city had no more cats, dogs, donkeys, or horses as the people had eaten them all. To stay alive, the people were forced to eat seaweed washed ashore, but it failed to provide sufficient nutrients, leaving many to suffer from ulcers, scurvy, diarrhoea, and swelling from the joints. Many of the townsfolk were described as being “skeletal” beings, with pale, livid skin who could barely walk.

After around a year of holding out, the leaders of the Greeks, Notis Botsaris, Kitsos Tzavelas and Makris made a plan to escape the city in a conference held at the church of Ayios Spiridhon. When all food supplies had run out and there was no hope of relief, the besieged Greeks decided that some of the menfolk of fighting age should burst out of the gates and attempt to lead the women and children to safety, while the rest would remain to defend the town to the death on 10 April [N.S. 22 April] 1826. Georgios Karaiskakis would attack the Turks from the rear and create a diversion while the besieged Greeks would escape the city. Of the 9,000 inhabitants only 7,000 were strong enough to take part. The population consisted of some 3,500 men of military age, 1,000 workers and 4,500 women and children. The plan was that, on the night of 10 April, the people were to charge over the eastern section of the walls, use wooden bridges they carried to cross the Ottoman ditches and then wait for Karaiskakis to come. The exodus was to be divided into three with Dhimitrios Makris leading out the women and children on the right, Kitsos Tsavellas leading the group on the left and Notis Botsaris leading the centre. Those who were dying and/or too sick were piled into houses packed full of gunpowder to blow themselves up when the Ottomans arrived to kill them. All of the Ottoman prisoners were killed while Bishop Joseph quashed what the British historian David Brewer called "a crazy plan" to kill all the women and children and just have the men escape. The Turks had been made aware of the escape plan by deserters, but Ibrahim, preferring that the Greeks escape to spare his forces further fighting, did little to block the Greeks.

When night came on 10 April, the moon was obscured by clouds that came in from the sea. In silence, the bridges were dragged over the walls while others threw blankets and pillows into the ditch. Karaiskakis failed to make his promised attack, but the Greeks heard shooting in the hills to the east and assumed he was coming. A thousand soldiers crossed the bridges, followed by the women and children, with the rest all tensely waited for the signal to come out. The clouds now disappeared and the moonlight illuminated the nocturnal exodus, with Karaiskakis still having failed to appear. A cry of embros (forward) went up and the everyone rushed out, and then somebody shouted opiso (fall back). When the refugees charged out of the city gates they were fired upon by Turks and Egyptians from defensive positions. Many of the Greeks panicked and fled inside the walls while the Ottoman-Egyptian forces had already entered the city, killing, looting and raping. In the confusion, thousands were trampled to death while others fell into the ditch and drowned. The Ottomans and Egyptians set the city on fire, leading Kasomoulis to remember: “The torch that was Missolonghi shed its light as far as Vasiladhi and Klisova and over the whole plain, and even reached us. The flashes of gunfire looked like a host of fireflies. From Missolonghi we heard the shrieks of women, the sound of gunfire, the explosion of powder magazines and mines, all combined in an indescribably fearful noise. The town was like a roaring furnace”. In the morning, the Ottoman cavalry set off in pursuit of the refugees while, where Karaiskakis was supposed to be, a party of Albanians were waiting to kill the men and to take the women and children to sell into slavery. Of the 7,000 people that tried to escape, only 1,000 made it to safety. The next morning Palm Sunday the Turks entered the city. Many of the Greeks killed themselves by blowing themselves up with gunpowder rather than surrender. The rest were slaughtered or sold into slavery, with the majority of the surviving Greek Christian women becoming sex slaves to Egyptian soldiers. The Turks displayed 3,000 severed heads on the walls.

== Aftermath and commemoration ==
Though a military disaster, the siege and its aftermath proved a victory for the Greek cause, and the Ottomans paid dearly for their harsh treatment of Missolonghi. After this incident, many people from Western Europe felt increased sympathy for the Greek cause, as manifested for example in the famous Delacroix painting Greece on the Ruins of Missolonghi (1827). The siege of Missolonghi also inspired Gioacchino Rossini's opera Le siège de Corinthe.

This public sympathy for the Greeks had a significant influence on the eventual decision of Britain, France and Russia to intervene militarily in the Battle of Navarino and secure Greece's independence – with the result that, among other things, within four years Missolonghi fell into Greek hands again.

The unfinished poem The Free Besieged by Dionysios Solomos is dedicated to the siege.

French composer Ferdinand Herold composed a three act opera "Le dernier jour de Missolonghi" based on a libretto by Georges Ozaneaux, staged in 1828.

Victor Hugo's poem ‘’Les Têtes du sérail’’ from his Les Orientales (1829) celebrates the Greek heroes of the siege. The siege is referenced in the ALPHA 60 song Ruins of Missolonghi.

Missolonghi is considered a 'sacred city' (ἱερὰ πόλις) in modern Greece for its role and sacrifice in the Greek War of Independence. About 500 metres (1,600 ft) of its fortifications remain to the present day.

The Greek folklore song "Children of Samarina" (Greek: Παιδιά της Σαμαρίνας) refers to the Messolonghi events and the heroic "Exodus of its Guards". During the exit from Messolonghi, the Macedonian Guard consisting of local volunteers from Samarina, was the vanguard of the besieged, resulting in the most casualties from the Ottomans.

== See also ==
- First siege of Missolonghi
- Second siege of Missolonghi
- Naousa massacre
- Chios massacre
- Destruction of Psara

== Sources ==
- Brewer, David (2011). The Greek War of Independence: The Struggle for Freedom from Ottoman Oppression. London: Overlook Duckworth. ISBN 978-1-5902-0691-1.
- Brooks, Allan (2013). Castles of Northwest Greece: From the Early Byzantine Period to the Eve of the First World War. Huddersfield: Aetos Press. ISBN 978-0-9575846-0-0.
- Christopoulos, Georgios A. & Bastias, Ioannis K., eds. (1975). Ιστορία του Ελληνικού Έθνους [History of the Greek Nation] (in Greek). Vol. ΙΒ: Η Ελληνική Επανάσταση (1821 - 1832) [The Greek Revolution (1821 - 1832)]. Athens: Ekdotiki Athinon. ISBN 978-960-213-108-4.
- Doganis, Th. (1929). "Μεσολόγγιον". Μεγάλη Στρατιωτικὴ καὶ Ναυτικὴ Ἐγκυκλοπαιδεία. Tόμος Τέταρτος: Καβάδης–Μωριάς [Great Military and Naval Encyclopaedia. Volume IV: Kavadh–Morea] (in Greek). Athens: Ἔκδοσις Μεγάλης Στρατιωτικῆς καὶ Ναυτικῆς Ἐγκυκλοπαιδείας. pp. 503–507. OCLC 31255024.
- Paroulakis, Peter Harold. The Greeks: Their Struggle for Independence. Hellenic International Press, 1984. ISBN 0-9590894-0-3
- Paparrigopoulos, Konstantinos (1932). Ιστορία του Ελληνικού Έθνους, από των αρχαιοτάτων χρόνων μέχρι του 1930. Τόμος ΣΤ', Μέρος Α': Από της επαναστάσεως του 1821 μέχρι της τελευταίας περιόδου του αγώνος (in Greek). Athens: Eleftheroudakis.
