= Adam Friedel =

Danish painter and adventurer (c. 1780 – c. 1868)

Adam Friedel or Adam Friedel von Friedelsburg (c. 1780 – c. 1868) was a Danish military man, philhellene and buccaneer. He is known for the portraits he painted of the heroes of the Greek War of Independence.

== Biography ==
After the Napoleonic Wars, where he served as an officer, Friedel travelled with a noble compatriot of his to the Ottoman Empire. He was initiated into the Filiki Eteria (Greek Society of Friends) and after numerous expeditions and missions in Russian territories, he ended up in Zakynthos. He witnessed the beginning of the Greek War of Independence in Peloponnese, where he enlisted in the army as a volunteer claiming to be Baron Friedel von Friedelsburg, a second lieutenant of aristocratic origin.

Friedel met many fighters of the Greek War of Independence in person such as Theodoros Kolokotronis, Nikitaras, Petrobey Mavromichalis, Markos Botsaris, Demetrios Ypsilantis, Ioannis Kolettis, Alexandros Mavrokordatos, etc. He also gained the trust of Demetrios Ypsilantis with his cultivation and proficiency in Greek and was thus assigned a multitude of missions. In June 1822, though, a compatriot of his who was a Danish sub-lieutenant unveiled his lies. Friedel was then discharged from the Greek army and in 1823 he travelled to Egypt in order to gather funds from his expatriates for the Greek War of Independence. 1824 found him in Messolonghi with Lord Byron. However, when I.-I. Meyer published an article in the Greek newspaper Ellinika Chronika in which he warned philhellenic companies to avoid the fraudulent Friedel, he fled to London where he opened a lithographer’s shop.

Once his hopes of a military career evaporated, Friedel showed his talent at painting. The 24 real-life portraits of the leaders of the Greek War of Independence which he created, were lithographically printed and colorized by J. Bouvier. These portraits circulated in Paris and London between 1825 and 1826 thus aiding the philhellenic committees in their effort to raise awareness in Europe of the Greek War of Independence.

Because of health complications, Friedel was forced to leave England and head to southern France and then Italy before finally returning to Athens in 1849 where he was awarded two important decorations for his contribution to the Greek Struggle for Independence. He then travelled to Smyrna, where he taught at a Greek school for two years. Friedel stayed in the capital of the Ottoman Empire during the Crimean War where he painted the portraits of several politicians. For reasons relating to his therapy again, he stayed in Bohemia until 1861 before heading back to Athens. He left again in 1863 and after a short stay in Istanbul, he returned yet again to Athens in 1865. There, he submitted a report to King George consisting of supporting documents, claims and information about his life and his contributions to the cause of Greece’s Independence, asking for a pension for his services to the country. It is not known when and where he died.

== Gallery ==
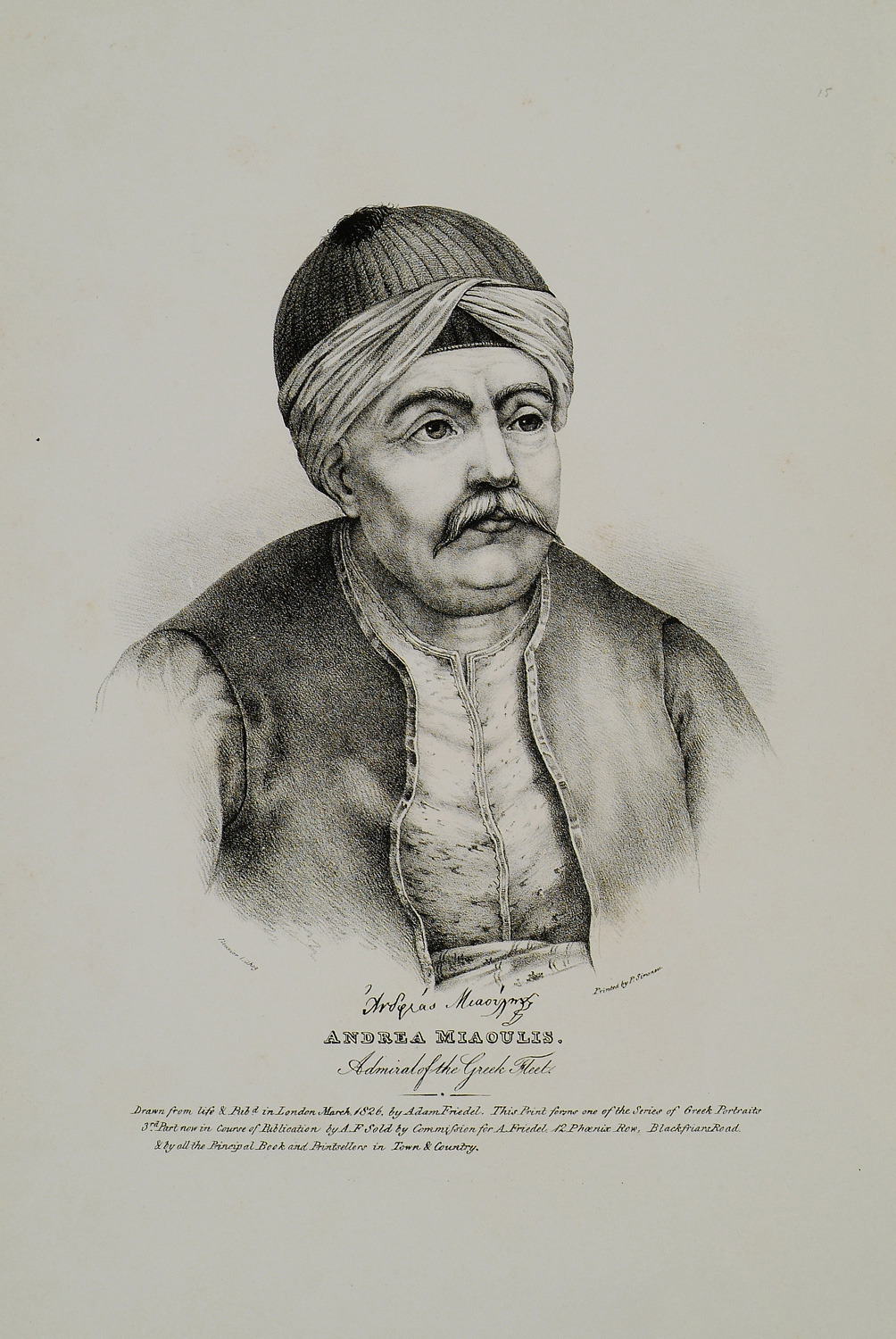
Andreas Miaoulis, Admiral of the Greek Fleet

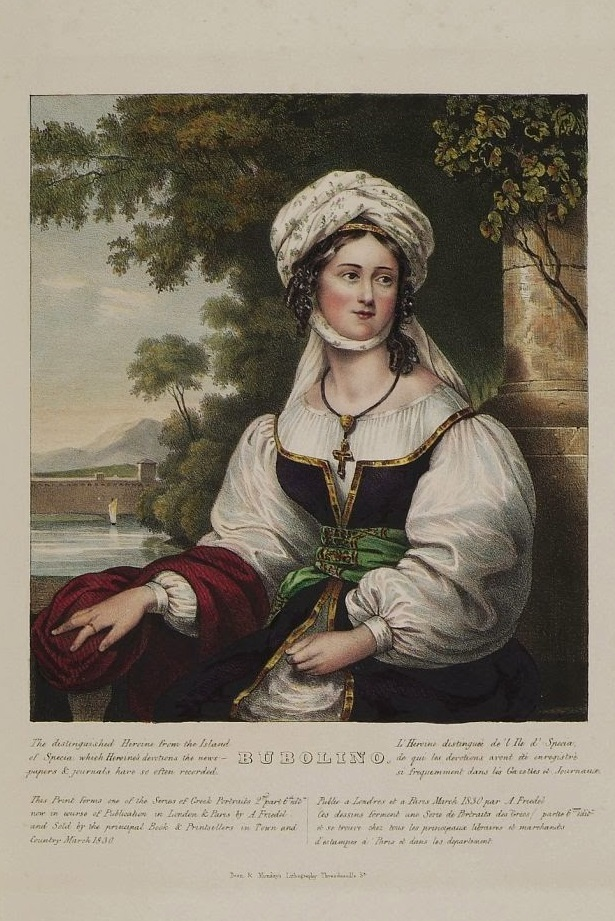
Laskarina Bubulina

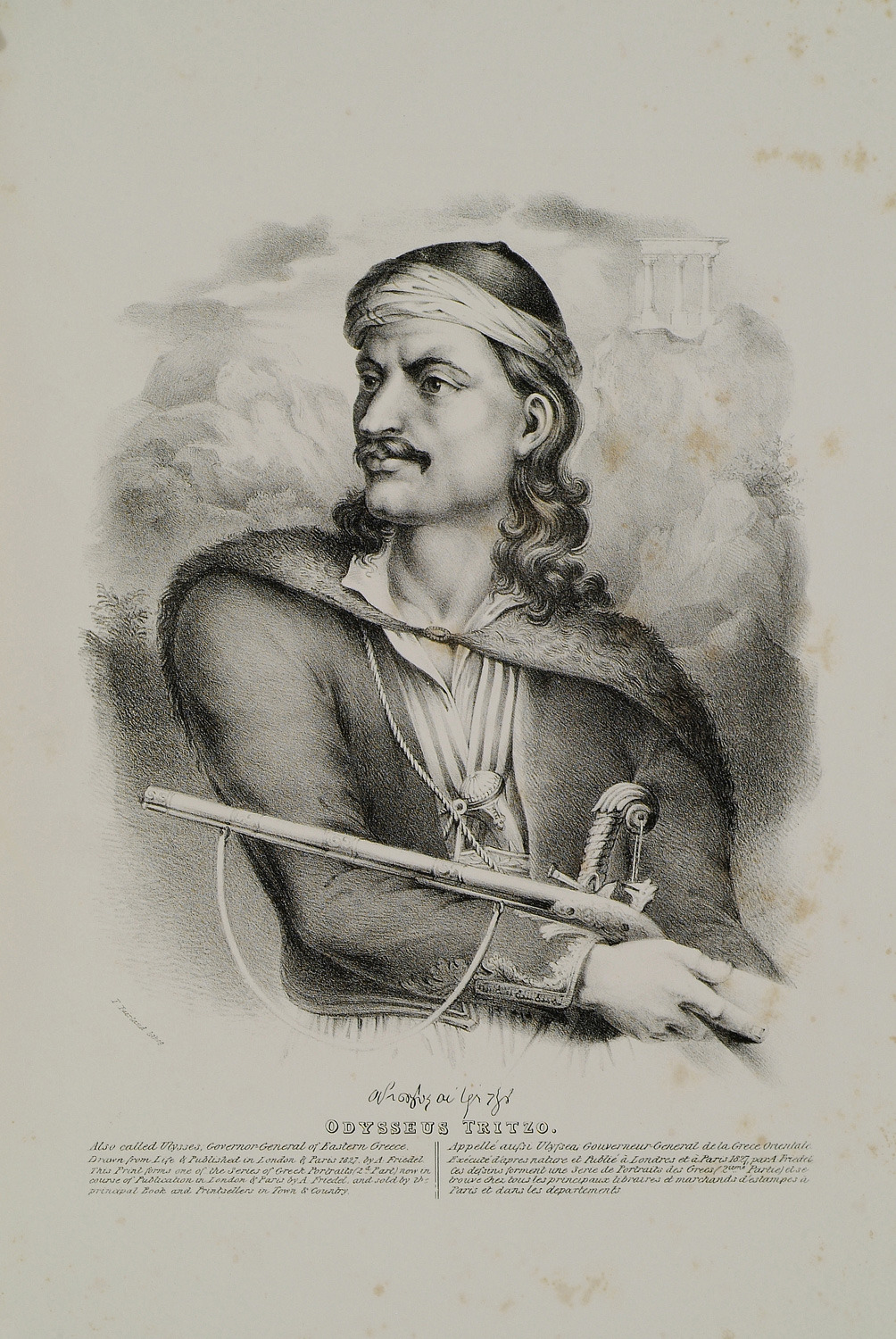
Odysseas Androutsos

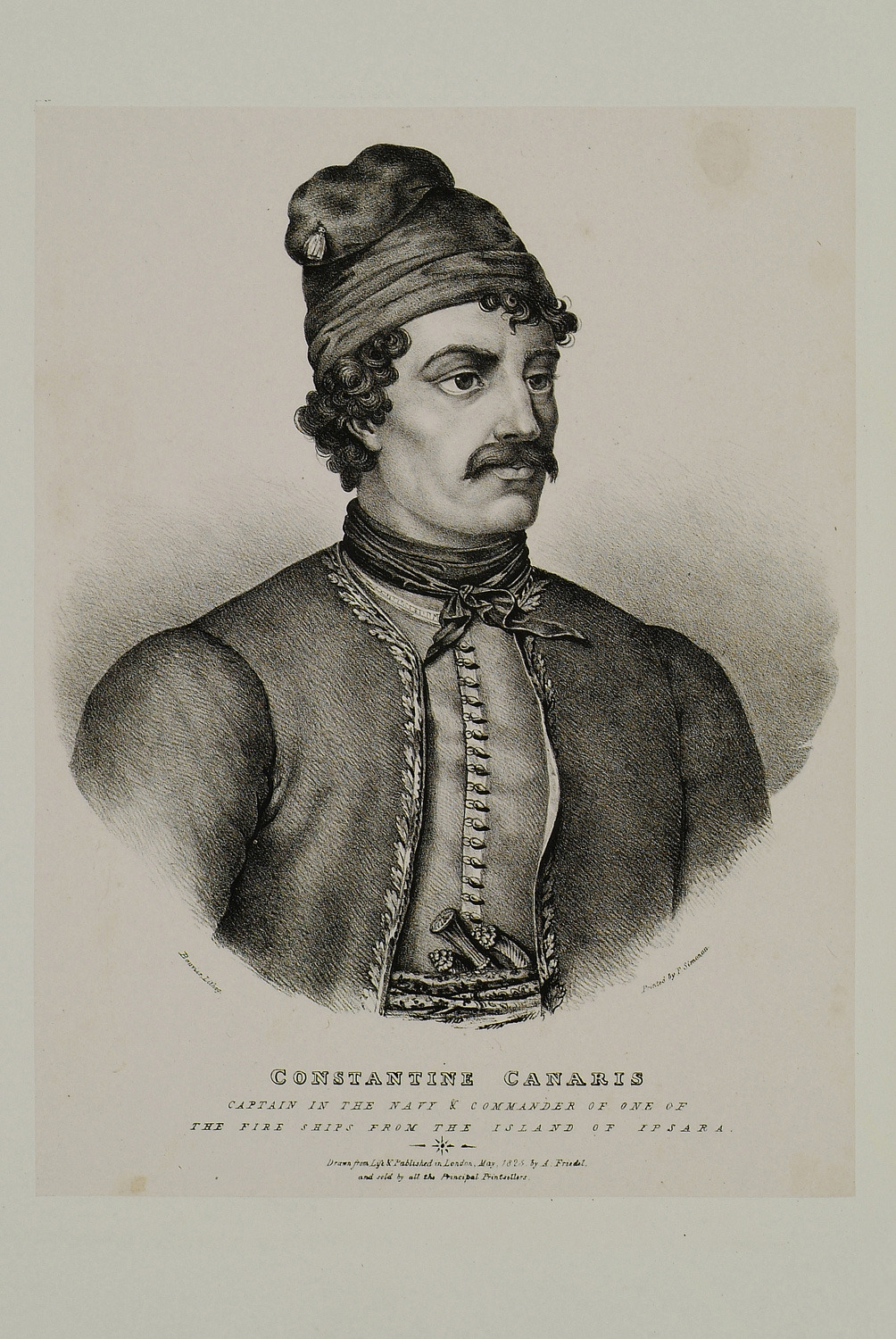
Konstantinos Kanaris

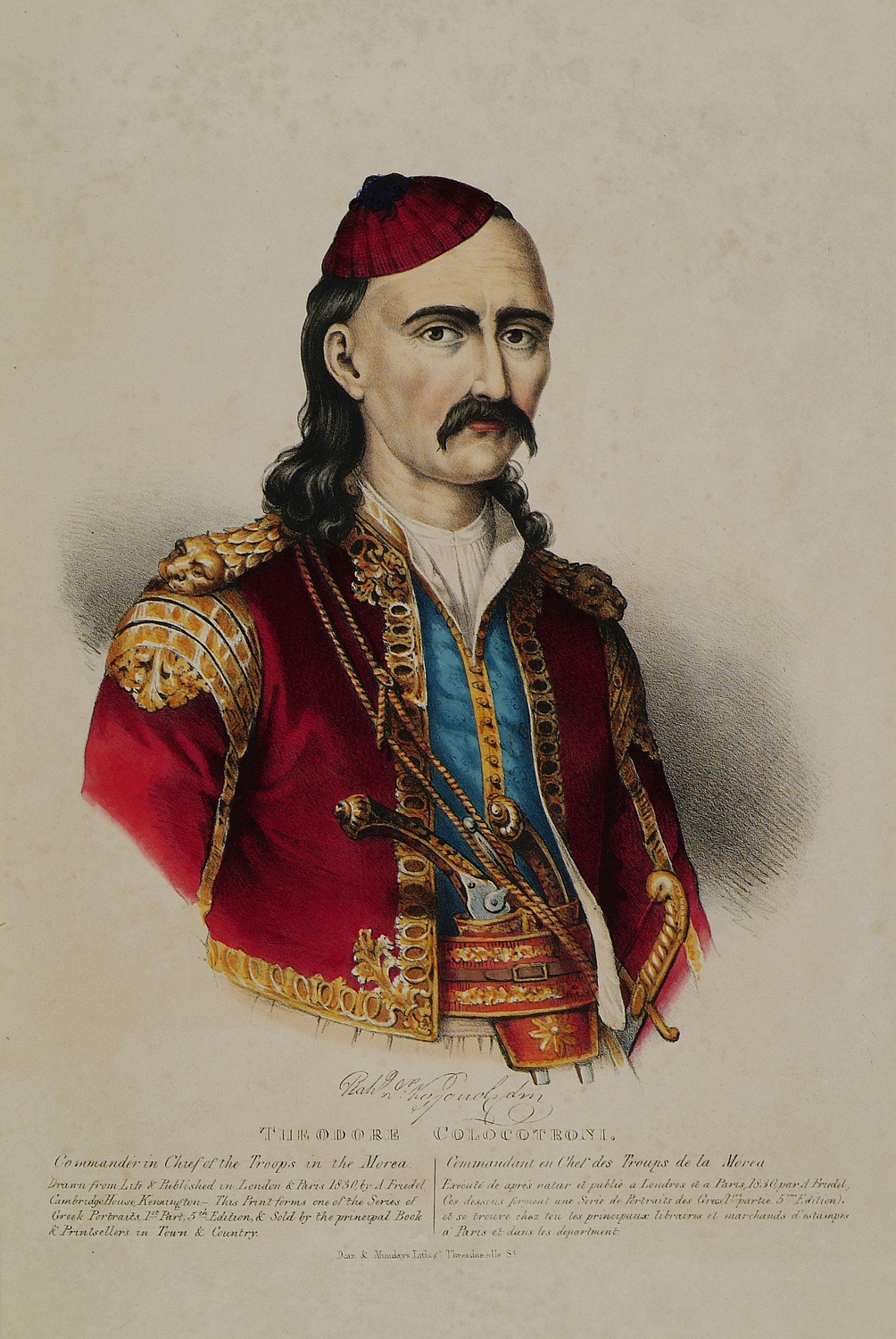
Theodoros Kolokotronis

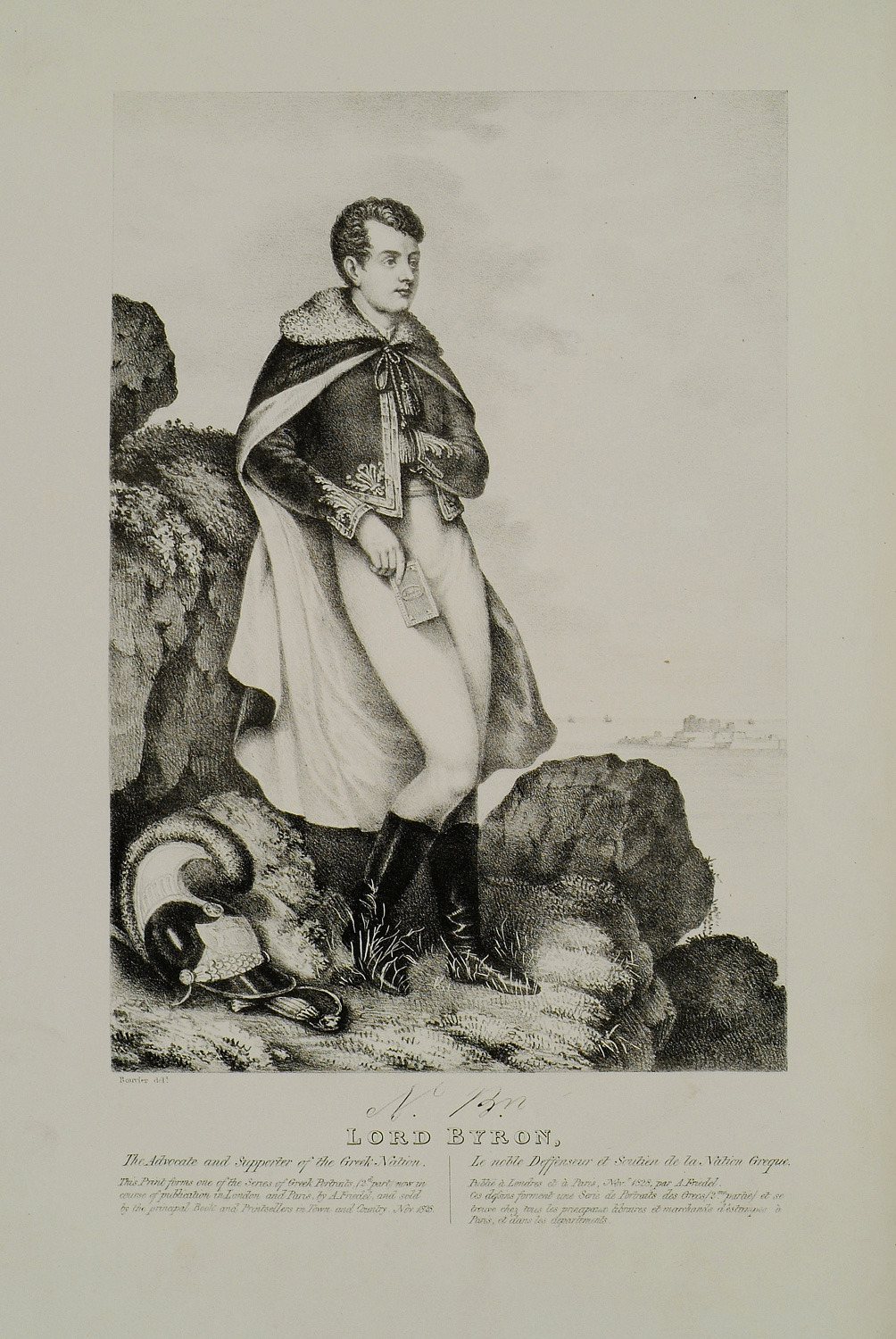
Lord Byron
