= Trikoupis =

Trikoupis is a surname. Notable people with the surname include:

- Charilaos Trikoupis (1832–1896), Greek politician
- Ioannis Trikoupis (1750–1824), Greek politician
- Nikolaos Trikoupis (1862–1956), Greek general and politician
- Spyridon Trikoupis (1788–1873), Greek statesman
