= Missolonghi =

Town in western Greece

Missolonghi Μεσολόγγι
- Municipality
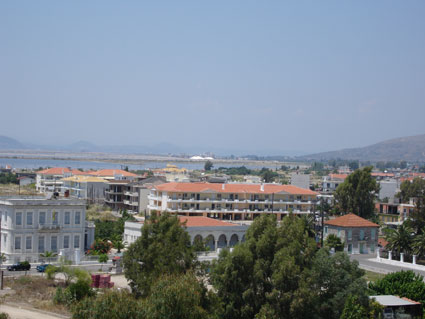
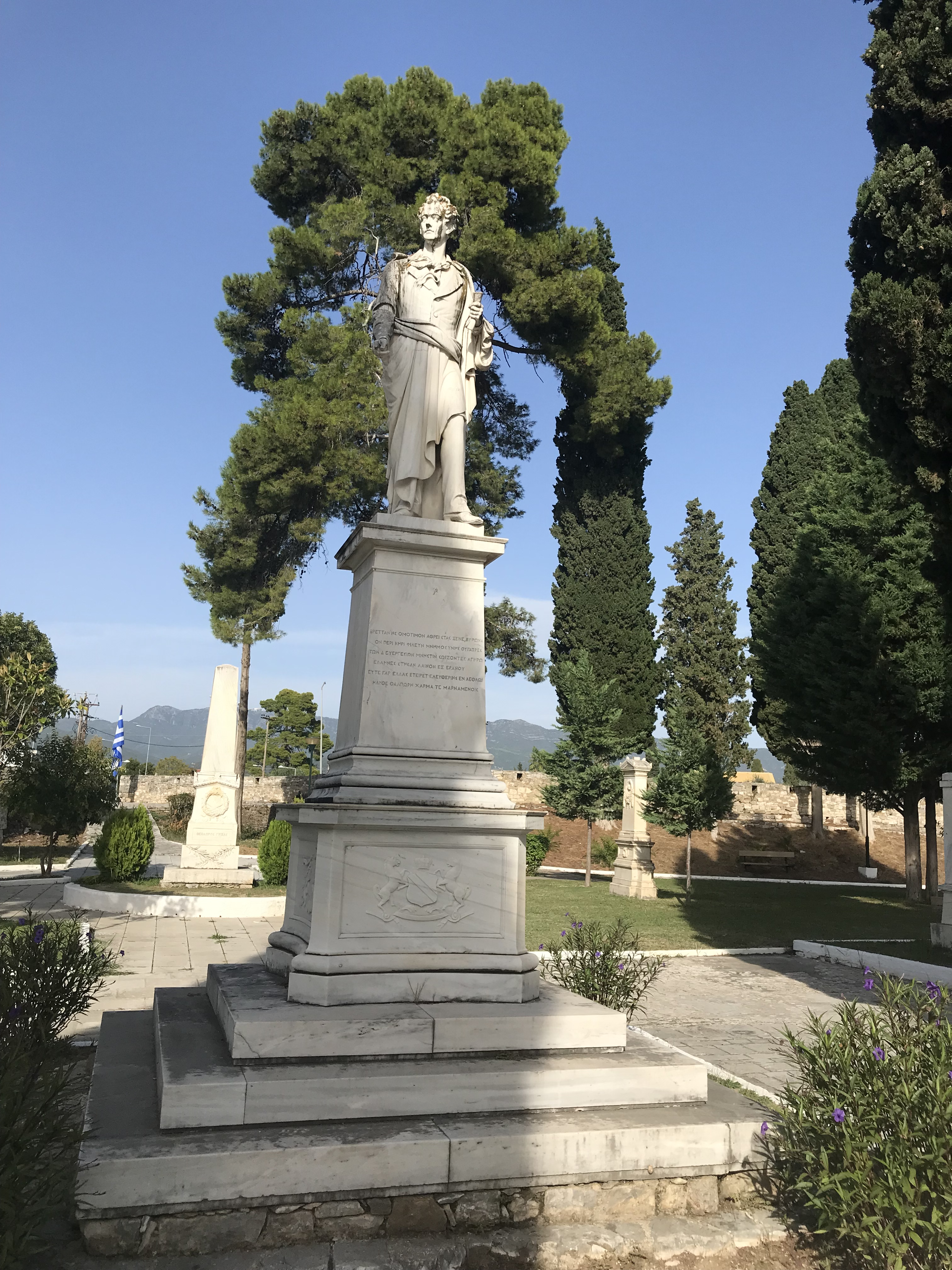
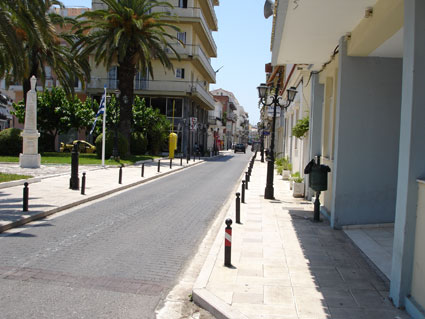
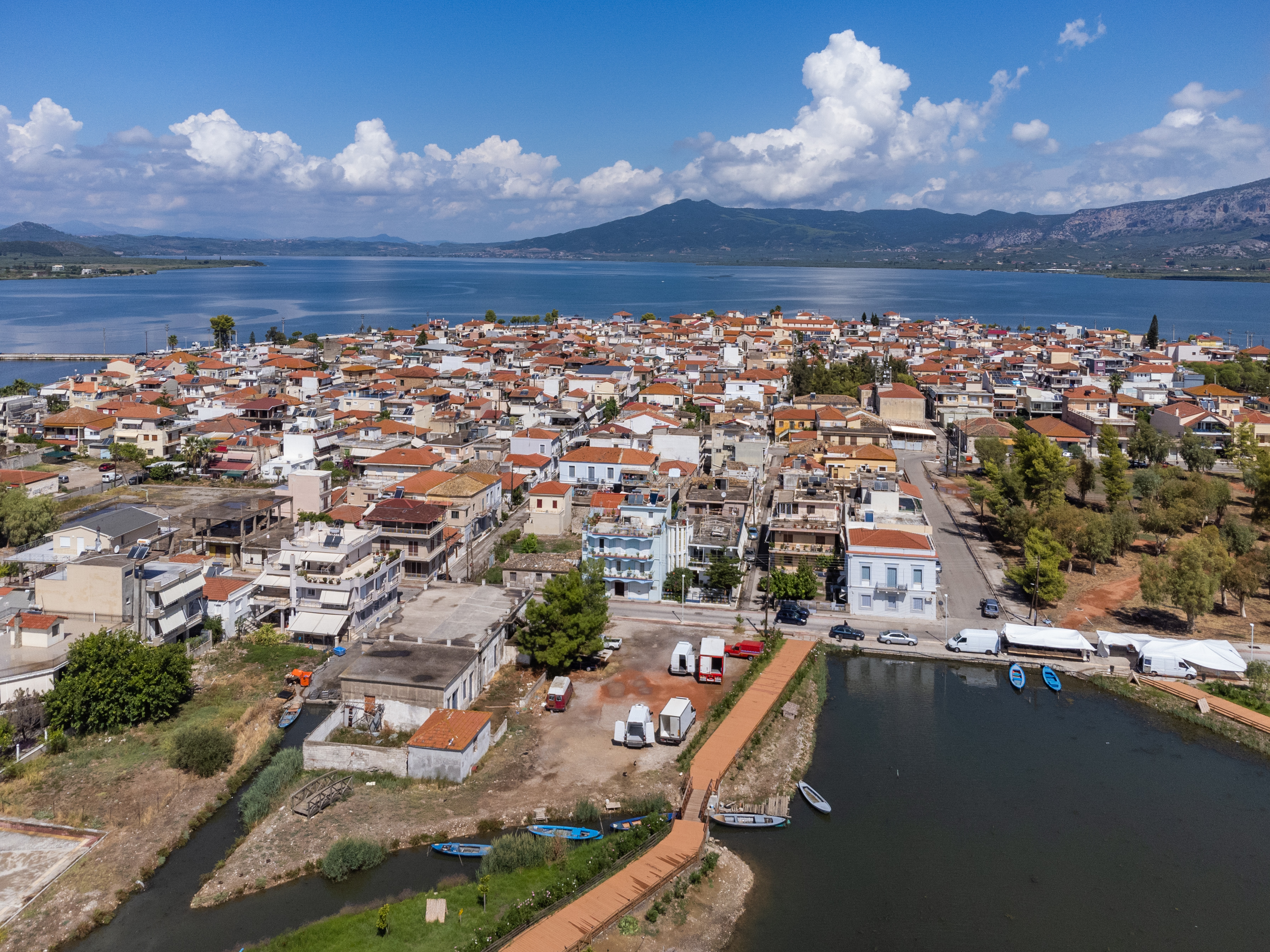
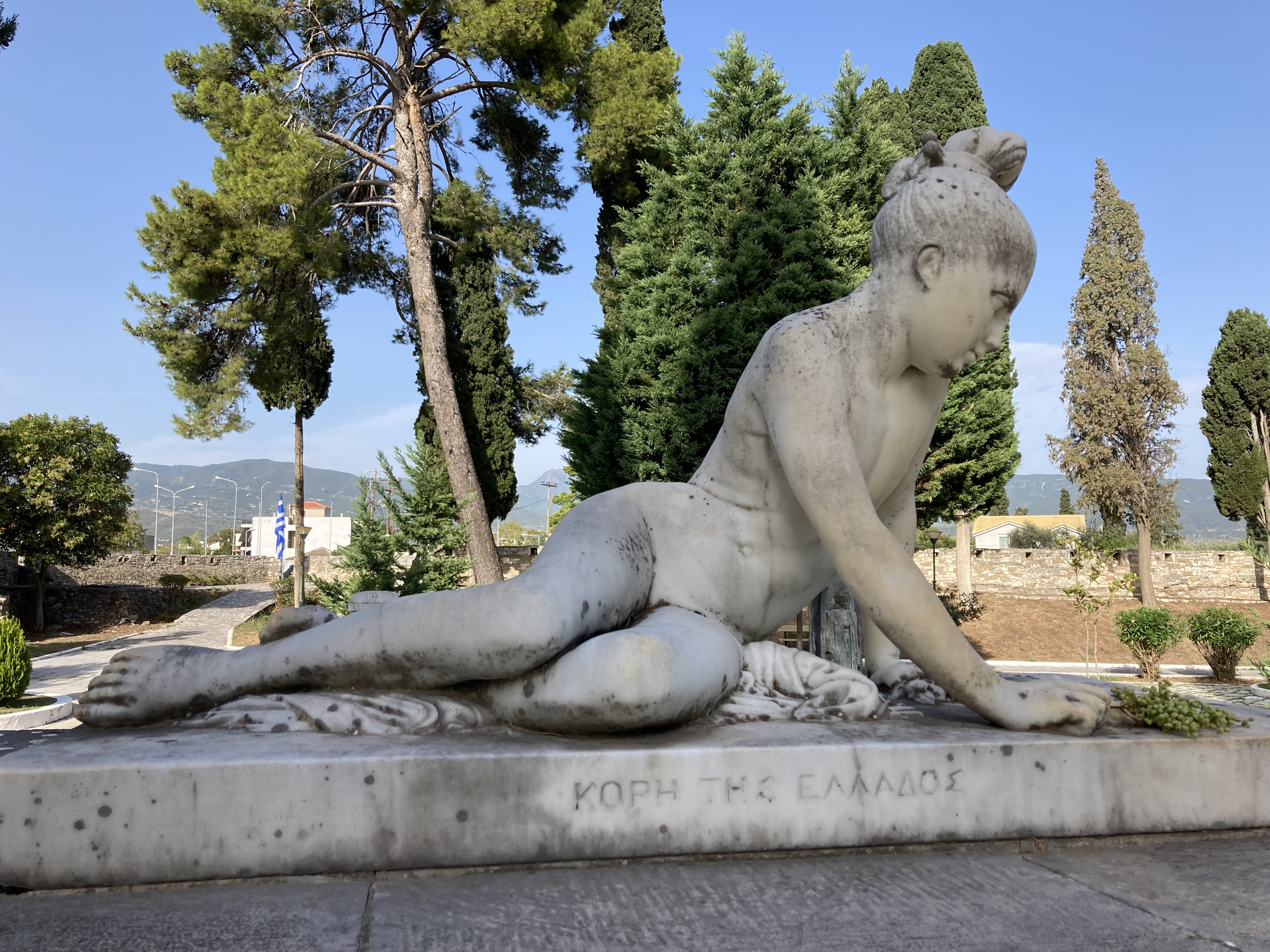
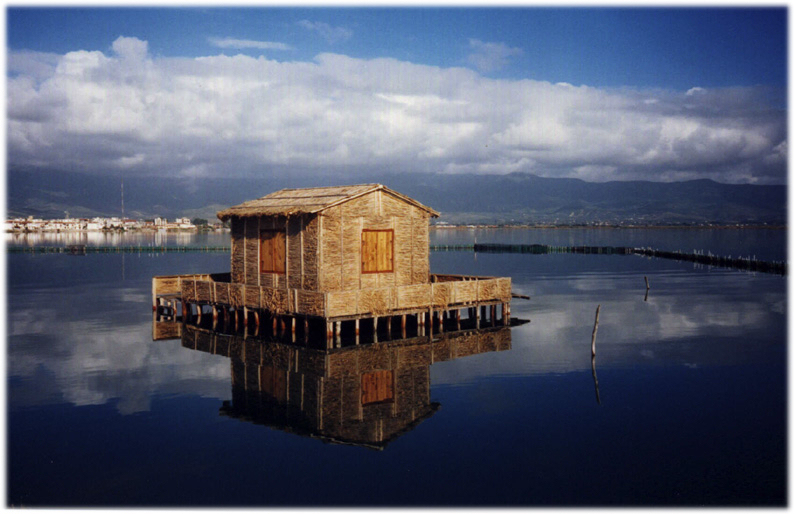
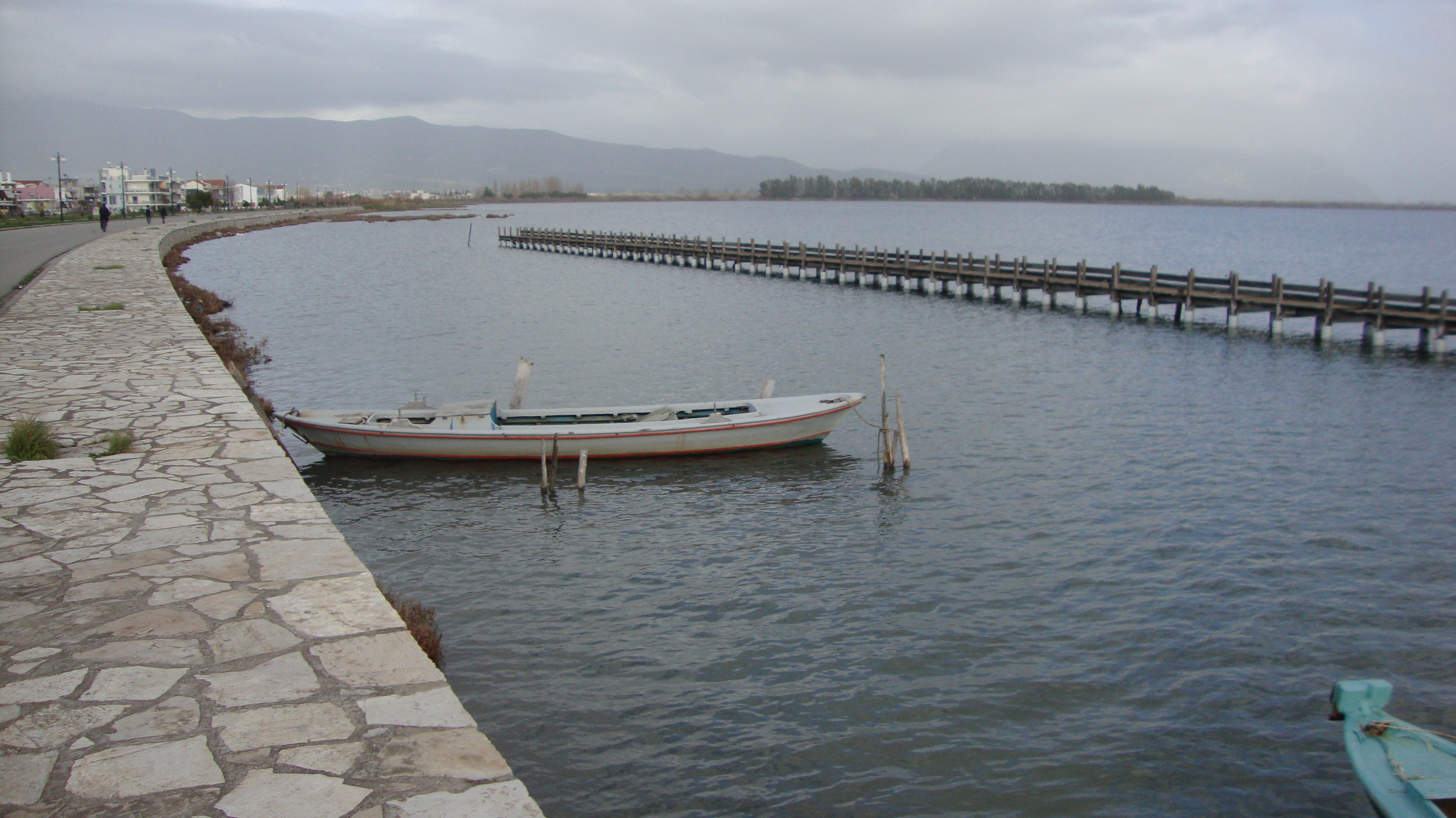
- From top left: view of the west part of the town, statue to Lord Byron in the Garden of Heroes, a street and square in the town, aerial view of Aitoliko, statue in the Garden of Heroes, a stilt house on the Missolonghi Lagoon, view of the port.

- Seal

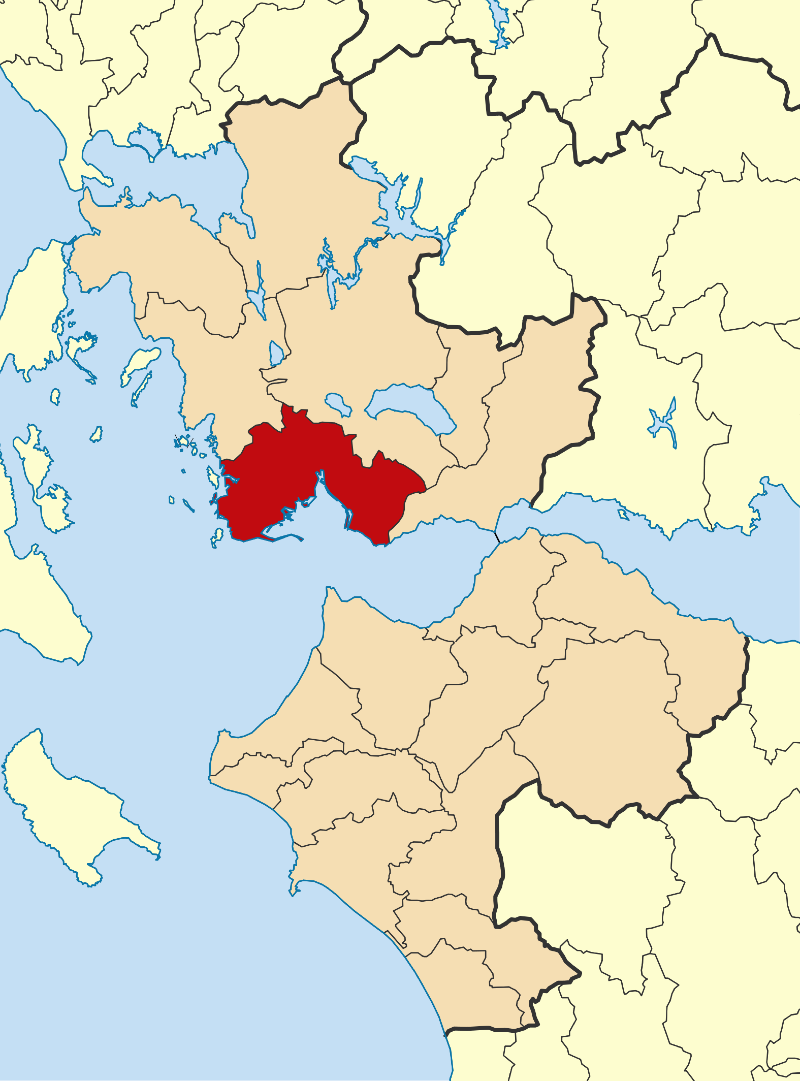

- Location within Greece
- Coordinates: 38°22′09″N 21°25′40″E
- Country: Greece
- Administrative region: West Greece
- Regional unit: Aetolia-Acarnania

Government
  - Mayor: Spyridon Diamantopoulos (since 2023)

Area
  - Municipality: 680.4 km^{2} (262.7 sq mi)
  - Municipal unit: 280.2 km^{2} (108.2 sq mi)
- Elevation: 8 m (26 ft)

Population (2021)
  - Municipality: 32,048
  - Density: 47.10/km^{2} (122.0/sq mi)
  - Municipal unit: 17,440
  - Municipal unit density: 62.24/km^{2} (161.2/sq mi)
  - Community: 13,965
- Time zone: UTC+2 (EET)
  - Summer (DST): UTC+3 (EEST)
- Postal code: 302 00
- Area code: 26310
- Vehicle registration: ΜΕ
- Website: www.messolonghi.gov.gr

Missolonghi or Mesolongi (Greek: Μεσολόγγι, pronounced [mesoˈloɲɟi]) is a town in western Greece. It is the capital of the Aetolia-Acarnania regional unit, and the seat of the municipality of Iera Polis Mesolongiou (Greek: Ιερά Πόλις Μεσολογγίου, lit. 'Sacred Town of Missolonghi'). According to the 2021 census, the municipality has a population of 32,048 people, of whom 13,965 live in the town of Missolonghi. Missolonghi is known as the site of a dramatic siege during the Greek War of Independence, during which the poet Lord Byron died.

== Geography ==
The town is located between the Achelous and the Evinos rivers and has a port on the Gulf of Patras. It trades in fish, wine, and tobacco. The Arakynthos mountains lie to the northeast. The town is almost canalized but houses are within the gulf and the swamplands. The Missolonghi–Aitoliko Lagoons complex lies to the west. In the ancient times, the land was part of the gulf.

=== Climate ===
Summers are long, hot and humid, with temperatures rarely surpassing 40 °C and sometimes remaining above 25 °C at night. Winters are short, mild and humid with frequent rainfalls.

== Transport ==
=== National Transport ===
The A5 Ionia Odos motorway passes north of Missolonghi.

The town had a railway station on the Hellenic Railways Organisation line from Krioneri to Agrinio but this has been abandoned since the 1970s.

The Intercity Buses Of Aitoloakarnania also have service towards Agrinio, Amfilochia, Astakos, Volos, Vonitsa, Thessaloniki, Lamia, Larisa, Livadeia, Mitikas, Patras, Chalkida and the capital Athens.

The local airport has a hard runway but no scheduled services. The closest airport with scheduled services is Aktion National Airport just an hour and half away.

Two new ferry connections towards Zakynthos, Cephalonia, and Ithaca were launched in 2020

== Education ==
Three departments of the University of Patras are based in the city.

== Administration ==
The municipality Missolonghi (official name: Greek: Δήμος Ιεράς Πόλεως Μεσολογγίου) was formed at the 2011 local government reform by the merger of the following 3 former municipalities, that became municipal units:

- Aitoliko
- Missolonghi
- Oiniades

The municipal unit Missolonghi is subdivided into 8 communities:

- Agios Georgios
- Agios Thomas
- Ano Koudouni
- Ellinika
- Evinochori
- Missolonghi
- Mousoura
- Retsina

The municipality has an area of 680.372 km^{2}, the municipal unit 280.168 km^{2}.

=== Province ===
The province of Missolonghi (Greek: Επαρχία Μεσολογγίου) was one of the provinces of the Aetolia-Acarnania Prefecture. Its territory corresponded with that of the current municipality Missolonghi (except part of the municipal unit Oiniades) and the municipal units Angelokastro, Arakynthos and Makryneia. It was abolished in 2006.

== History ==
=== Early history ===
North-west of Missolonghi are the remains of Pleuron (modern Asfakovouni), a town mentioned in Homer's works. It participated in the Trojan War and was destroyed in 234 BC by Demetrius II Aetolicus. The new town, which was built on the remains of old Pleuron, was one of the most important towns in Aetolia. Its monumental fortification comprised thirty towers and seven gates. The remains of the theatre and an enormous water tank with four compartments still exist.

The modern settlement of Missolonghi was first mentioned by a Venetian called Paruta when he was describing the naval Battle of Lepanto, which took place nearby. According to predominant historical opinion, its name came from the combination of two Italian words, mezzo and laghi which means "in the middle of lakes" or messo and laghi (Messolaghi) which means "a place surrounded by lakes".

The town grew as a fishing and trading hub. It was captured in 1684 by the Venetians, and held throughout the Morean War, but it was returned to the Ottoman Empire after the 1699 Treaty of Karlowitz. The town joined the Orlov Revolt in 1770, but the uprising was quickly quelled and it returned to Ottoman rule.

=== Greek War of Independence ===
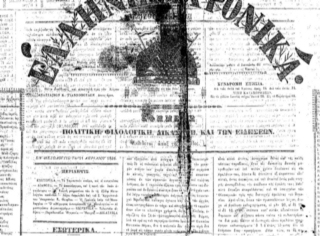
Title page of Ellinika Chronika (1824), one of the first newspapers in modern Greece, published in Missolonghi under the editorship of Swiss Philhellene Johann Jakob Meyer, who was killed during the sortie.

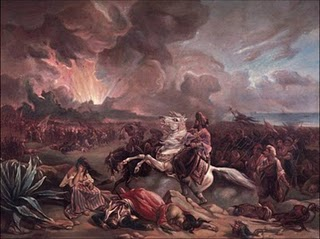
The Attack of Ibrahim Pasha against Messolonghi by Giuseppe Mazzola

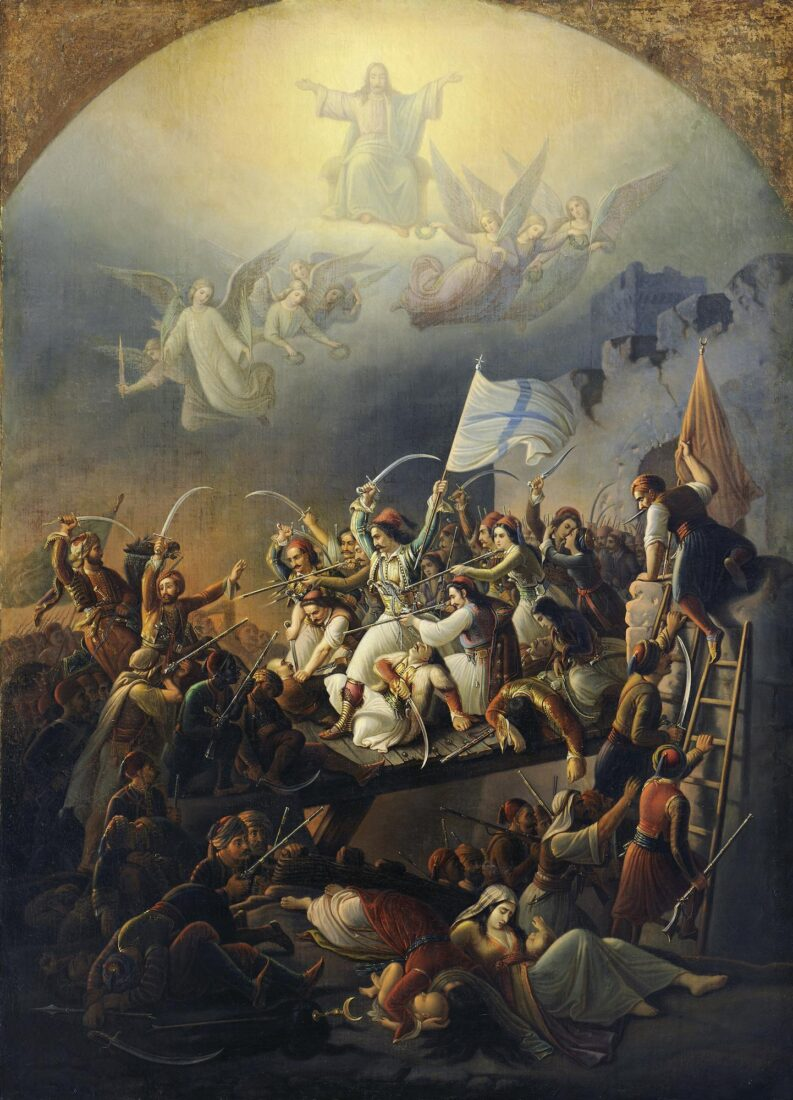
The Sortie of Missolonghi by Theodoros Vryzakis (1855)

When the Greek War of Independence broke out in spring 1821, Missolonghi was the first place in western Greece to join the uprising, on 20 May 1821, under the leadership of the town notables, chiefly Athanasios Razikotsikas, Panos Papaloukas, and A. Kapsalis. With rumours of Greek successes in the Morea and eastern Greece spreading throughout April, most of the Turkish families of the town had already evacuated to nearby Vrachori, where there was a strong Ottoman military presence. Missolonghi was soon reinforced by the klepht chieftain Dimitrios Makris, who immediately occupied the nearby island of Anatoliko; there too, the few Turks abandoned the town without resistance and made for Vrachori.

Its location made it a vital bastion to the Greeks in the War of Independence: protected by a chain of small islands and its lagoon from the sea, and by a wall and the marshy terrain from the landward side, it was strategically located near the Peloponnese and the Ionian Islands. Coming from Marseille, Alexandros Mavrokordatos landed in the town in July, and made it the base of his attempts to form his own power-base in western Greece, independent of the authority of Dimitrios Ypsilantis in the Morea. On 4 November, Mavrokordatos and his political allies convened an assembly of regional representatives in the town, which established a separate governing body, the "Senate of Western Continental Greece".

The town's fortifications were initially limited to a ditch 2 metres (6.6 ft) wide and 1.2 metres (3.9 ft) deep, in many places filled up with rubbish, as well as by a small wall, not higher than 1 metre (3.3 ft) and in need of repair, with fourteen guns. Nevertheless, the city held out against the first Ottoman attempt to capture it in 1822. A 7,000-8,000 strong Ottoman army under Omer Vryonis and Mehmed Reshid Pasha laid siege to the city on 25 October 1822. The small Greek garrison of 500 men, under Mavrokordatos, managed to delay the Ottomans by pretending to negotiate a surrender until the Greek fleet landed reinforcements on 8 November. The subsequent Ottoman attacks were beaten off, and the onset of winter, disease, and the attacks of other Greek forces from the rear under Georgios Karaiskakis forced the Ottoman commanders to lift the siege on 31 December 1822.

A second Ottoman attack, led by Vryonis and Mustafa Pasha of Scutari, was launched on 20 September 1823, and focused mostly on Anatoliko. Facing the onset of winter, disease, the failure of the simultaneous Ottoman operations in eastern Greece, and Greek attacks on their foraging parties, the Ottoman commanders abandoned the siege on 17 November.

Another siege started on 15 April 1825 by Reşid Mehmed Pasha whose army numbered 30,000 men and was later reinforced by another 10,000 men led by Ibrahim Pasha, son of Muhammad Ali Pasha of Egypt. After a year of relentless enemy attacks and facing starvation, the people of Missolonghi decided to leave the beleaguered city in the "Exodus of its Guards" (The Sortie) on the night of 10 April 1826. At the time, there were 10,500 people in Missolonghi, 3,500 of whom were armed. Very few people survived the Ottoman pincer movement after the betrayal of their plan.

Due to the heroic stance of the population and the subsequent massacre of its inhabitants by the Turkish-Egyptian forces, the town of Missolonghi received the honorary title of Hiera Polis (the Sacred City), unique among other Greek cities. The famous British poet and philhellene Lord Byron, who supported the Greek struggle for independence, died in Missolonghi in 1824. He is commemorated by a cenotaph, containing his heart, and a statue located in the town.

=== Modern era ===
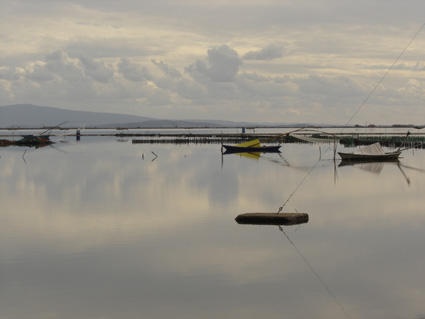
The lagoon of the city

The town itself is very picturesque but also modern with functional, regular urban planning. Some very interesting buildings representative of traditional architecture can be seen here. People whose names were related to modern Greek history once lived in some of them. The mansion of the Trikoupis family, Palamas' House, Valvios Library, Christos and Sophia Moschandreou Gallery of Modern Art emphasize the fact that Missolonghi has always been a city of some wealth and refinement. In addition, the Centre of Culture and Art, Diexodos, which hosts cultural events and exhibitions as well as the Museum of History and Art is housed in a neo-classical building in Markos Botsaris Square and hosts a collection of paintings indicative of the struggle of Missolonghi, further boosting the city's cultural and artistic profile. The Messolonghi Byron Society also, founded in 1991 in the city, is a non profit organisation which is devoted to promoting scholarly and general understanding of Lord Byron's life and poetry as well as cultivating appreciation for other historical figures in the 19th-century international Philhellenic movement, idealists who, like Byron, gave their fortunes, talents, and lives for the cause of Greek War of Independence. The Messolonghi Byron Center is now located in the upper floor of Byron House.

Today, the Entrance Gate remains intact and so does part of the fortification of the Free Besieged which was rebuilt by King Otto. Past the gate, there is the Garden of Heroes where several famous and some anonymous heroes who fought during the Heroic Sortie are buried. The Garden of Heroes is the equivalent of the Elysian Fields for modern Greece. Every year the Memorial Day for the Exodus is celebrated on Palm Sunday (the Sunday before Easter); the Greek State is represented by high-ranking officials and foreign countries by their ambassadors.

== Media ==
- Radiofonikos Stathmos Mesolongiou,(Radio Missolonghi 92FM),Website

== Landmarks ==
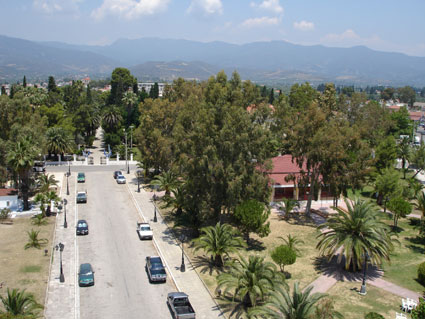
View of the Garden of Heroes

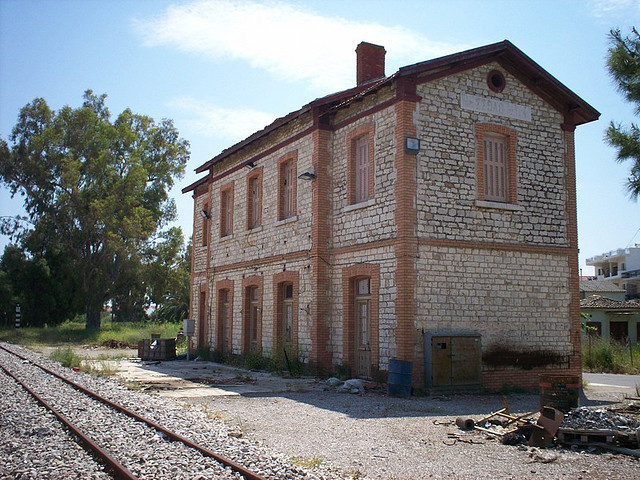
Railway station

- Museum of the History and the Art of the Sacred City of Messolonghi, Website
- Centre of Culture and Art, Diexodos,Website
- Christos and Sophia Mosxandreou Gallery of Modern Art
- The Messolonghi Byron Society-International Research Center for Lord Byron and Philhellenism,Website

== Notable people ==
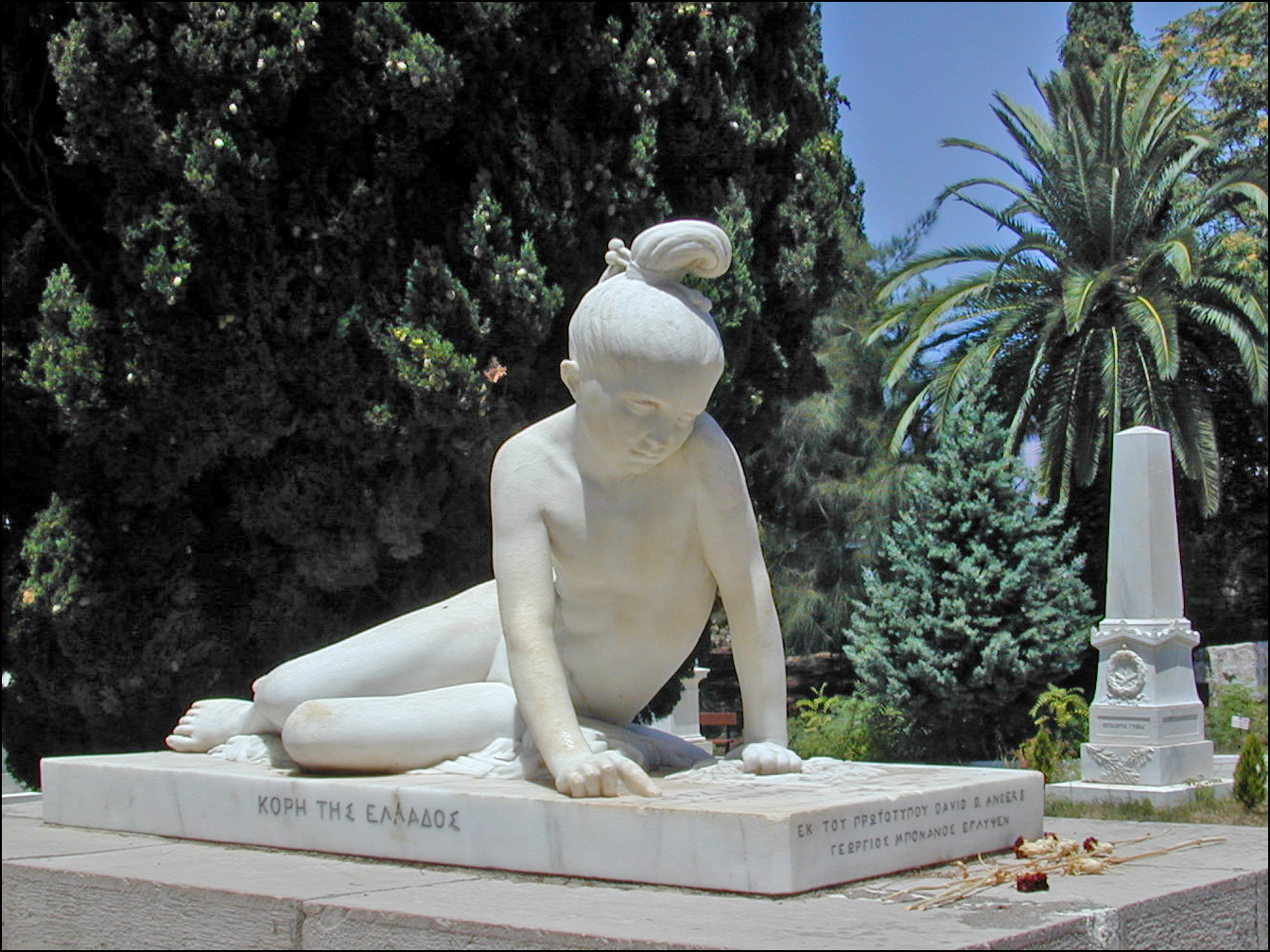
The tomb of Markos Botsaris (copy by Georgios Bonanos; the original by David d'Angers is located in Athens)

- Lord Byron died here in 1824 and is commemorated by a cenotaph and a statue
- Markos Botsaris (1790–1823), a Souliot general of the Greek revolutionary army and hero of the Greek War of Independence, was buried here.
- Epameinontas Deligeorgis (1829–1879), former Prime Minister of Greece
- John Lykoudis (1910–1980), major and medical doctor involved in the treatment of peptic ulcer disease
- Miltiadis Malakasis (1869–1943), poet
- Spyros Moustaklis, Army officer, democracy activist during the junta
- Thanasoulas Valtinos (1801 or 1802-1870 or 1877), revolutionary of the Greek War of Independence
- Kostis Palamas (1859–1943), Greek poet, co-author of the Olympic Hymn
- Anastasios Papoulas (1859–1935), Greek general and commander-in-chief in the Greco-Turkish War (1919–1922)
- Antonis Travlantonis (1895–1896), Greek educator, former director of Zosimaia School
- Charilaos Trikoupis (1832–1896), Prime Minister of Greece
- Nikolaos Trikoupis (1869–1956), Greek general
- Spyridon Trikoupis (1788–1873), Prime Minister of Greece, father of Charilaos Trikoupis
- Charalambos Tseroulis (1879–1929), Greek general
- Dimitrios Valvis (1814–1886), Prime Minister of Greece
- Zinovios Valvis (1800–1872), Prime Minister of Greece
- Sperantza Vrana (1926–2009), actress

== Historical population ==
Avgotaracho (Botargo) of Missolonghi

Year	City	Municipal unit	Municipality
1981	11,375	-	-
1991	10,916	16,859	-
2001	13,791	17,988	-
2011	14,386	18,482	34,416
2021	13,965	17,440	32,048

== International relations ==
=== Twin towns—sister cities ===
Missolonghi is twinned with:

Schöfflisdorf, Switzerland; Famagusta, Cyprus; Kalavryta, Greece; Lawrence, Kansas, United States; Gedling, UK	Morphou, Cyprus; Naousa, Greece; Psara, Greece; Hydra, Greece; Mani, Greece; Karpenisi, Greece

== Gallery ==
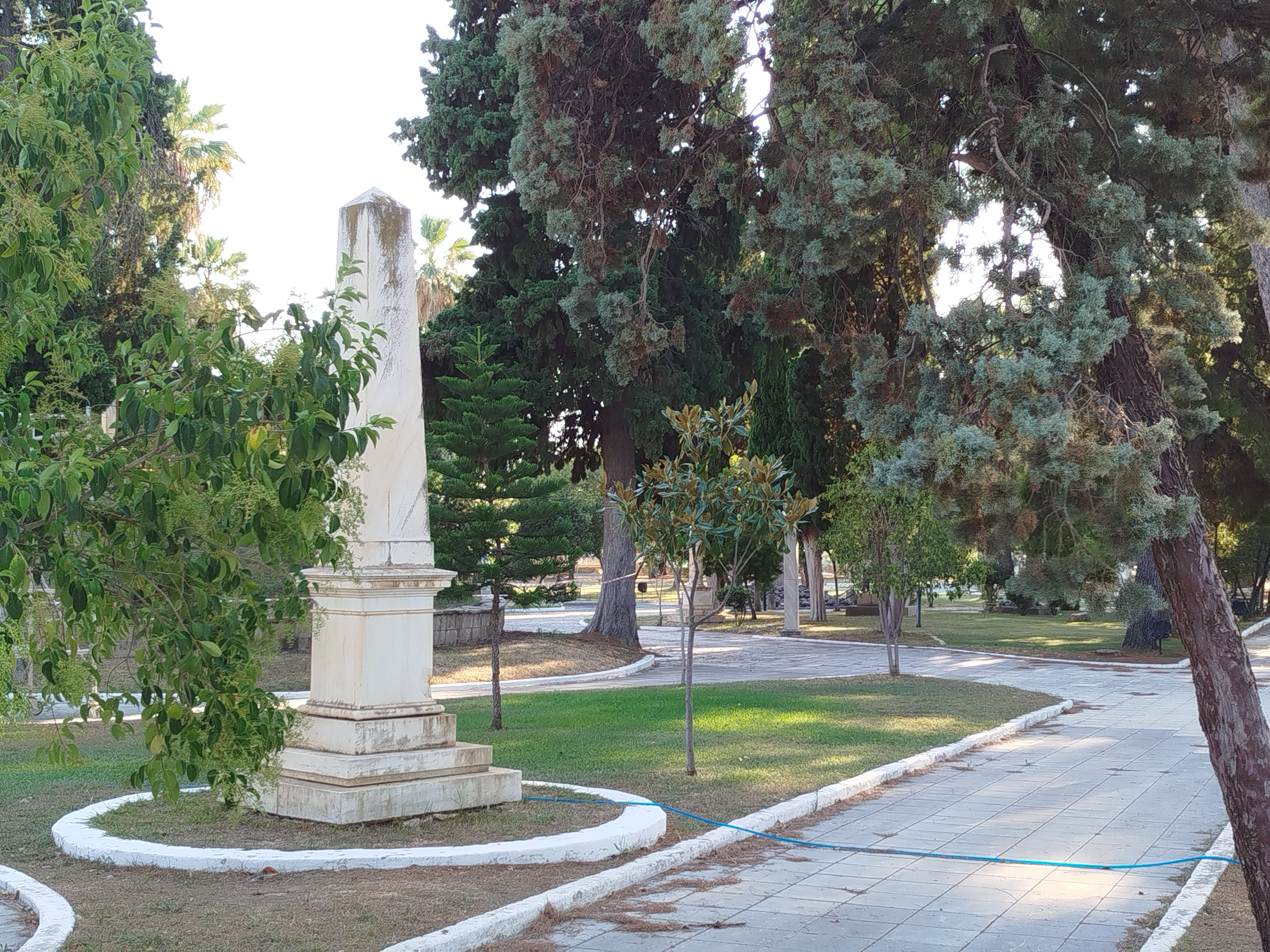

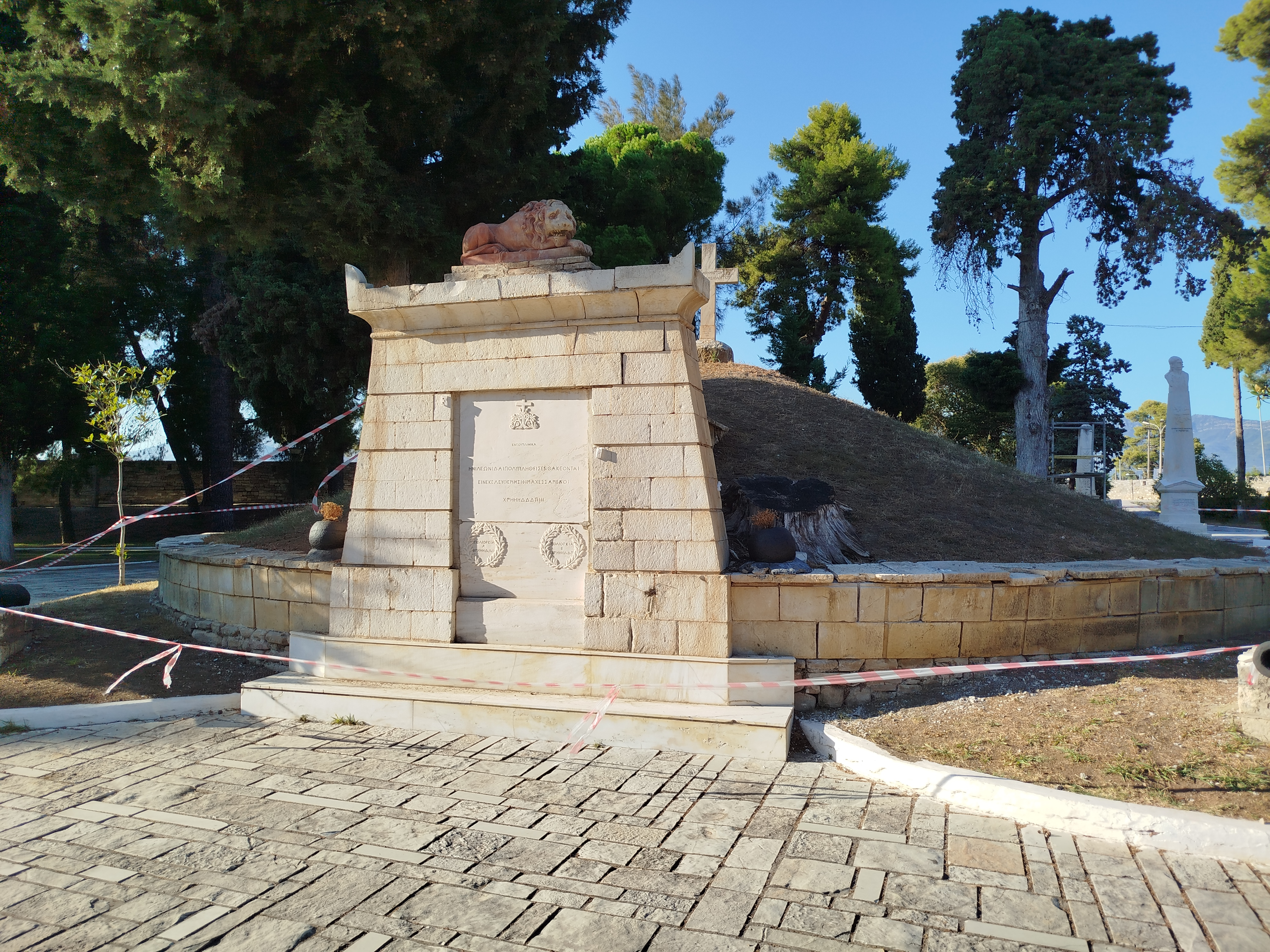

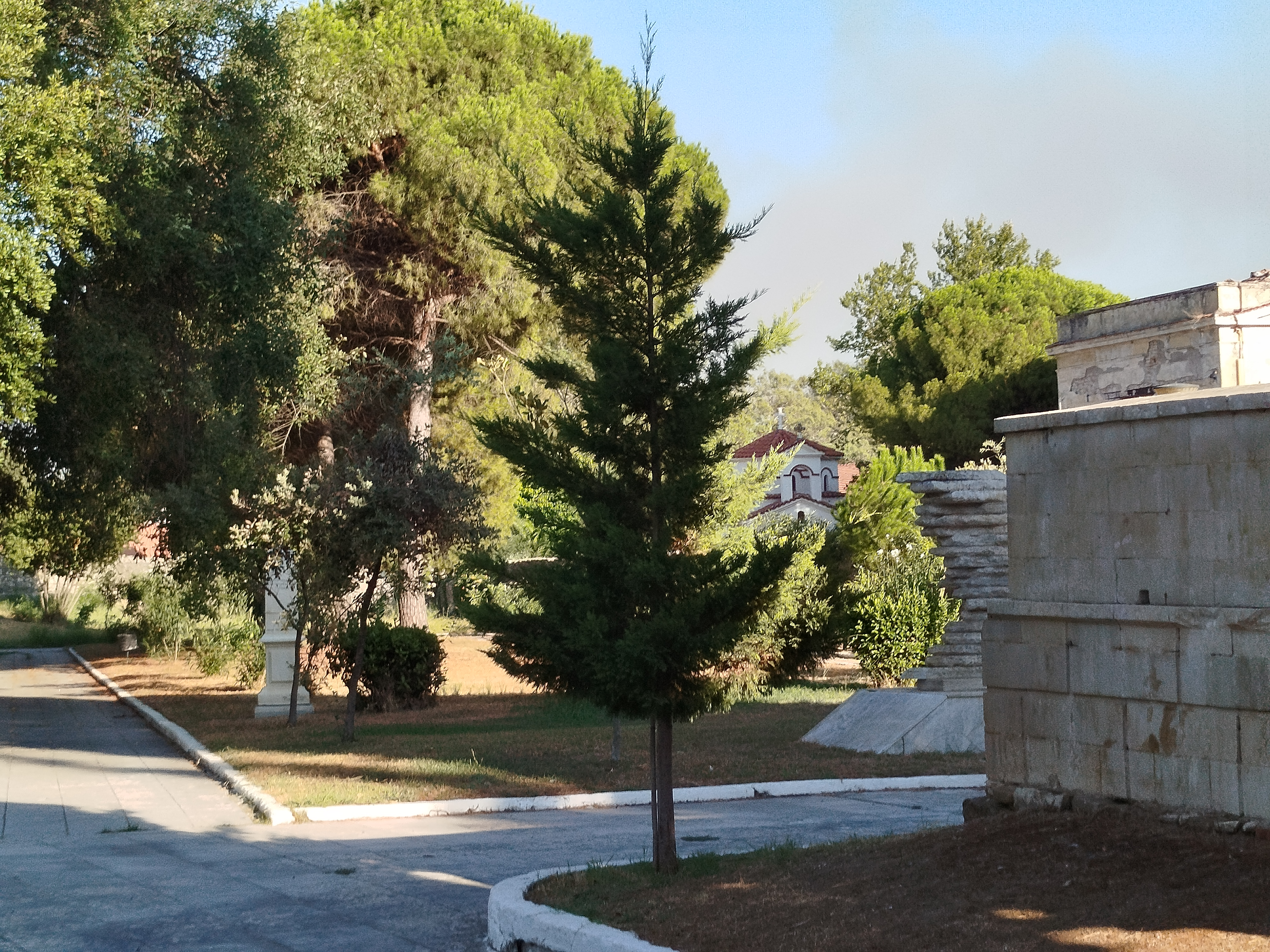

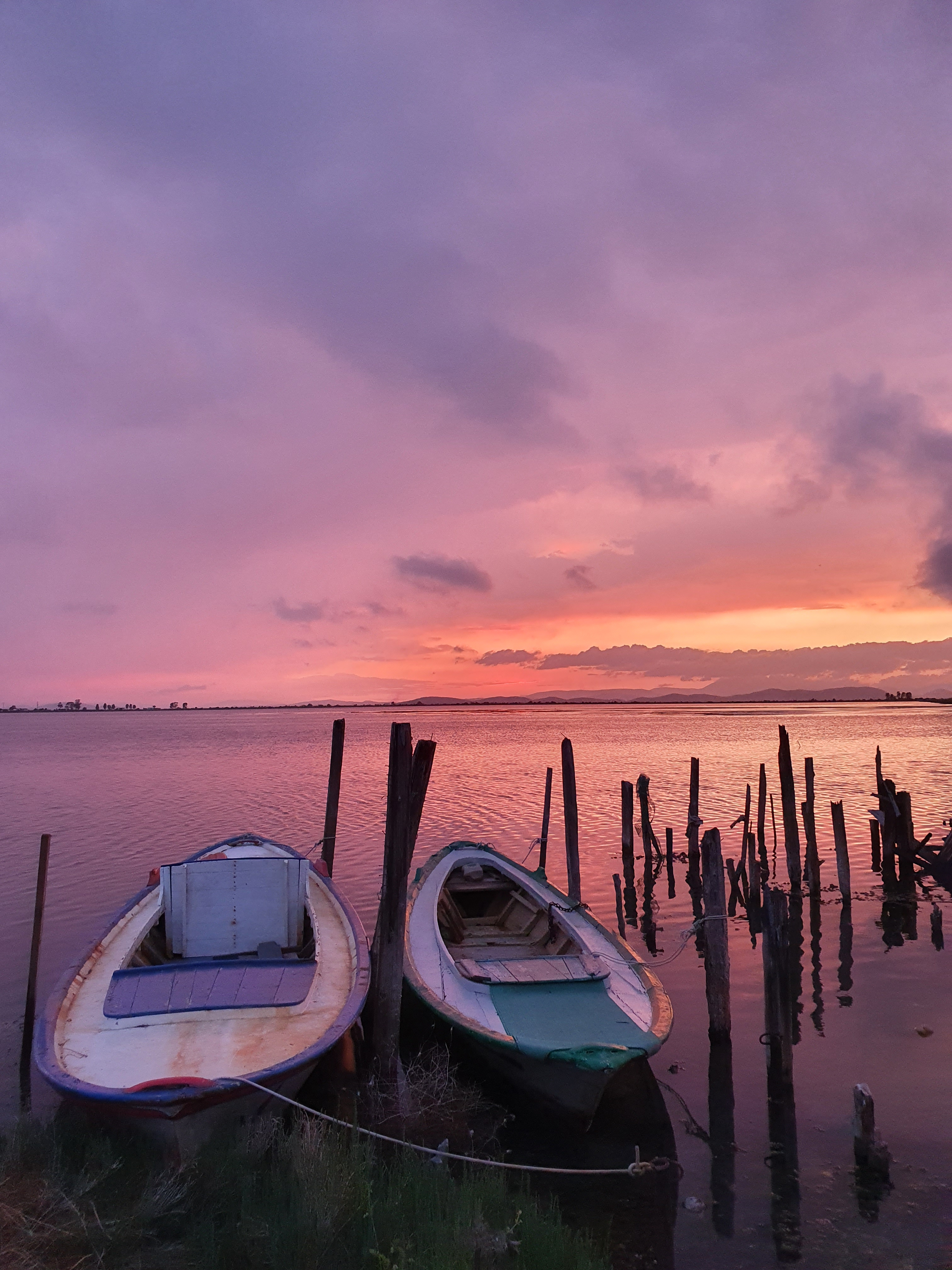

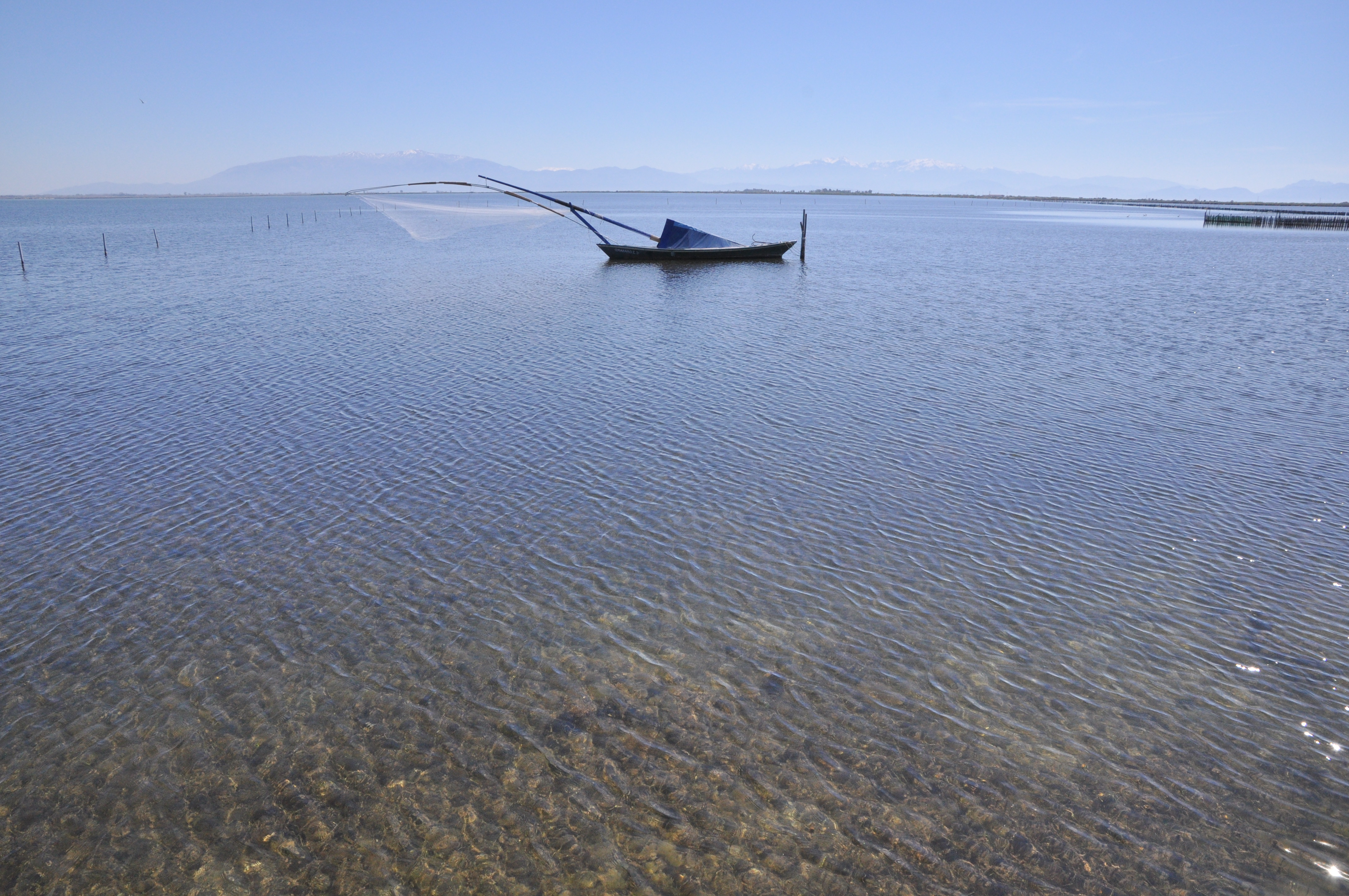

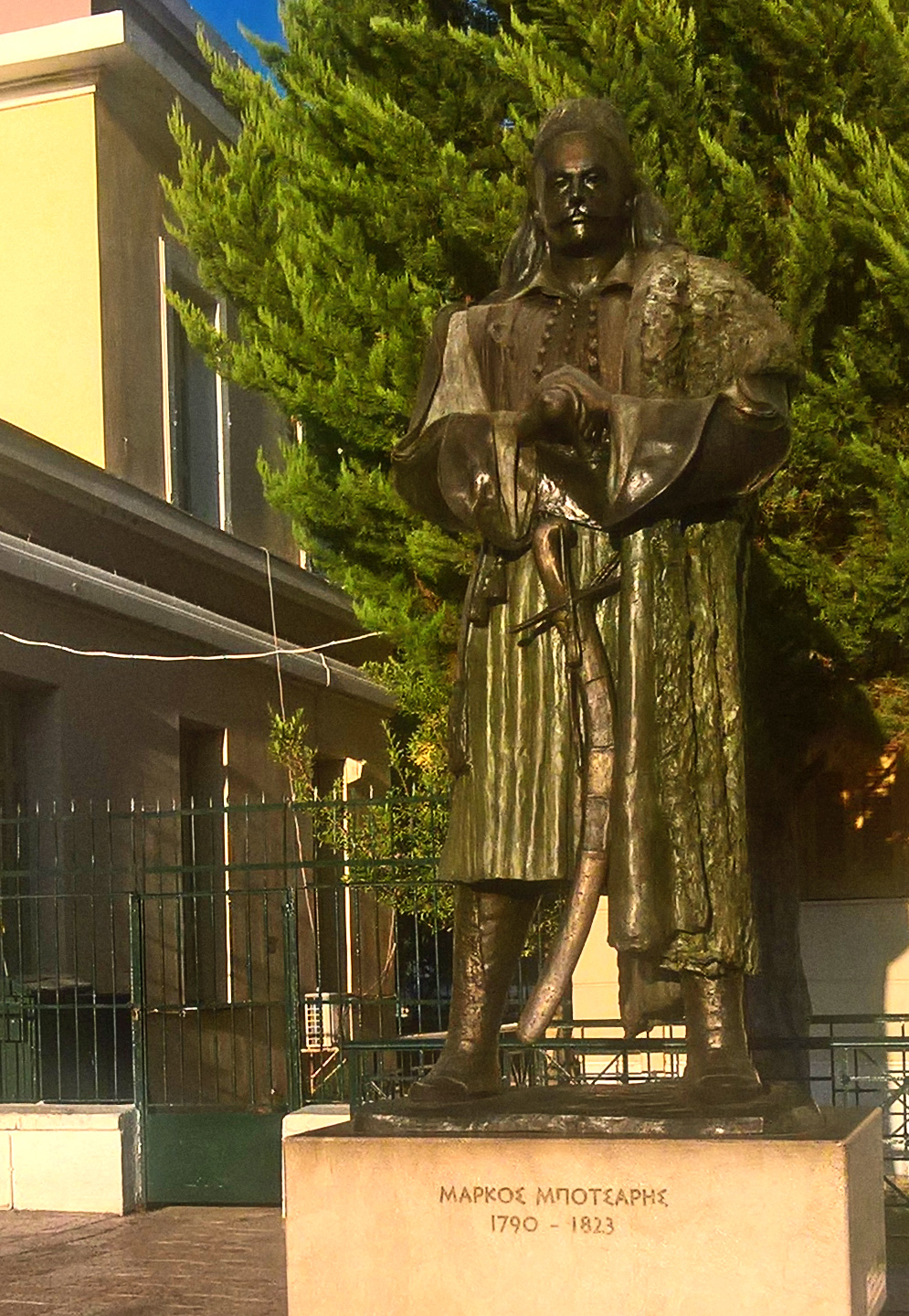

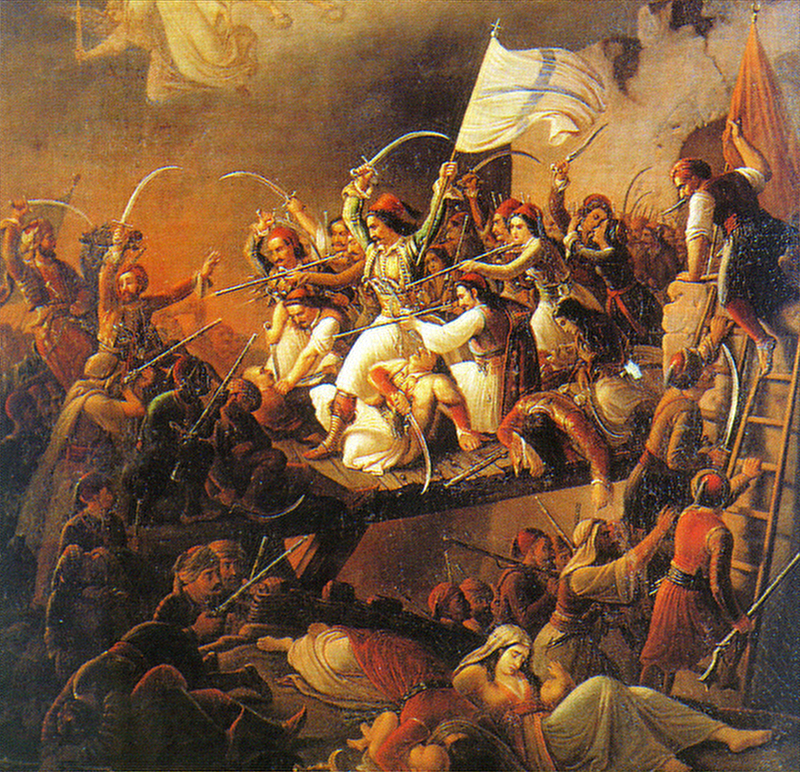

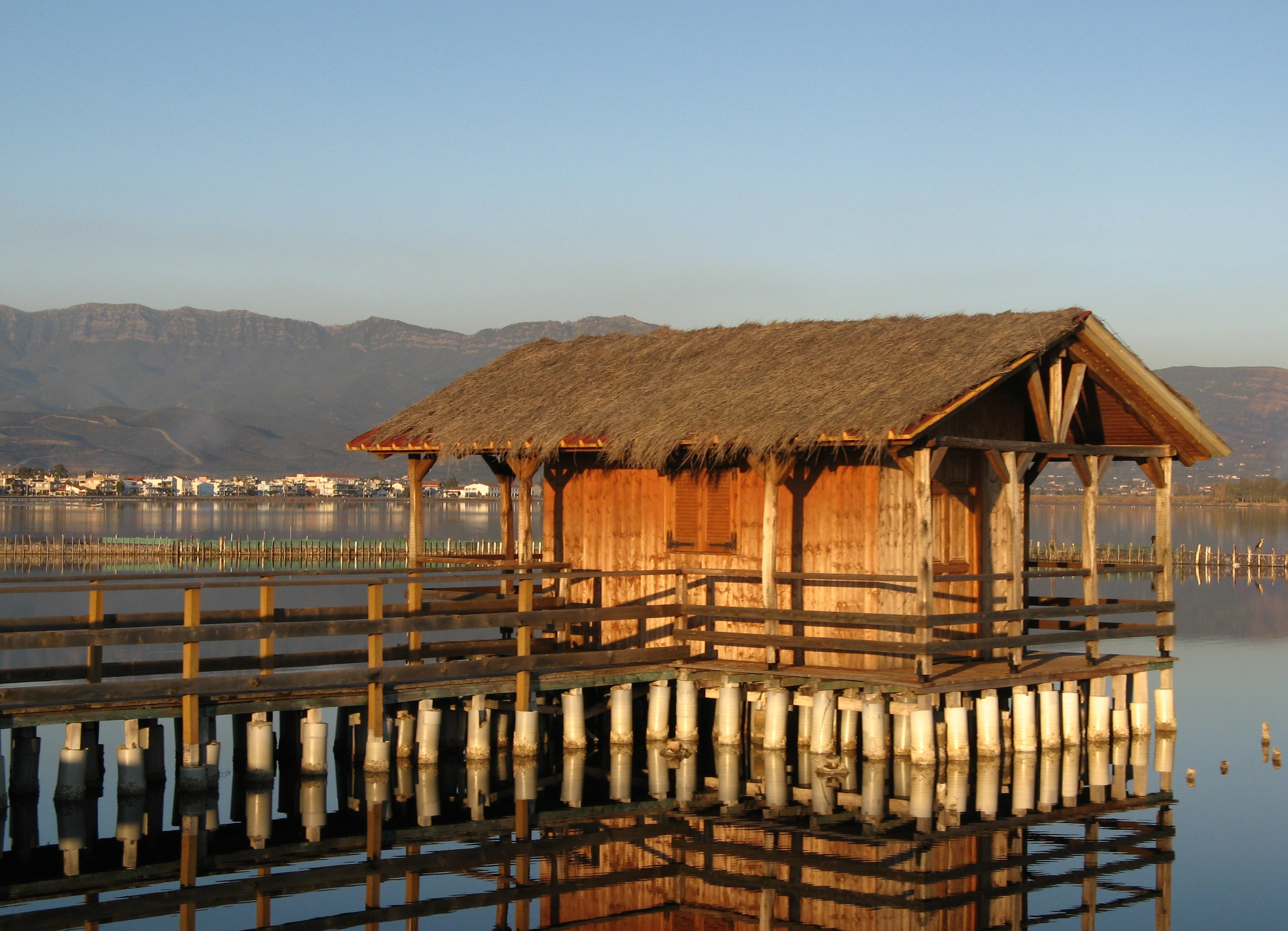

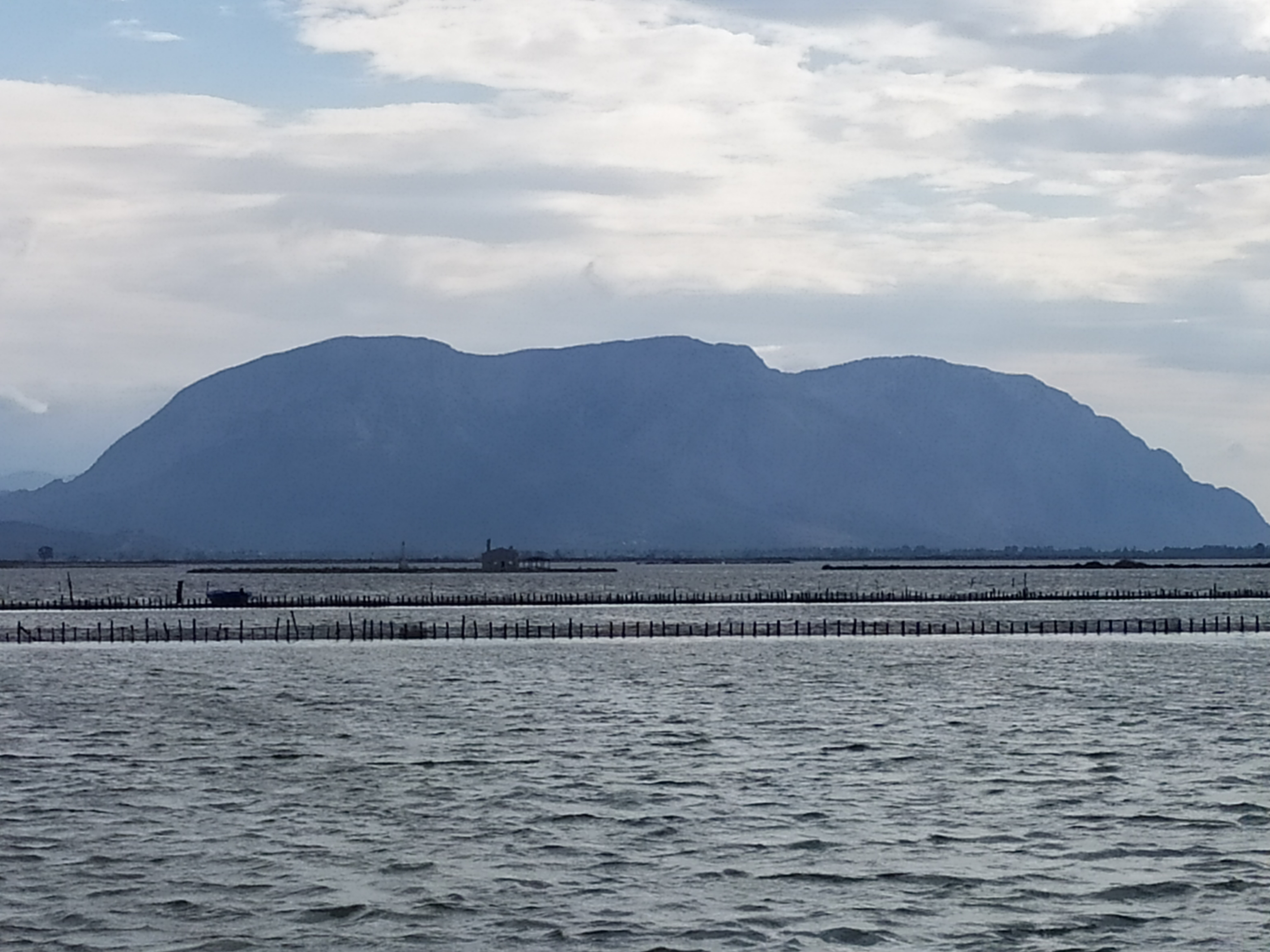

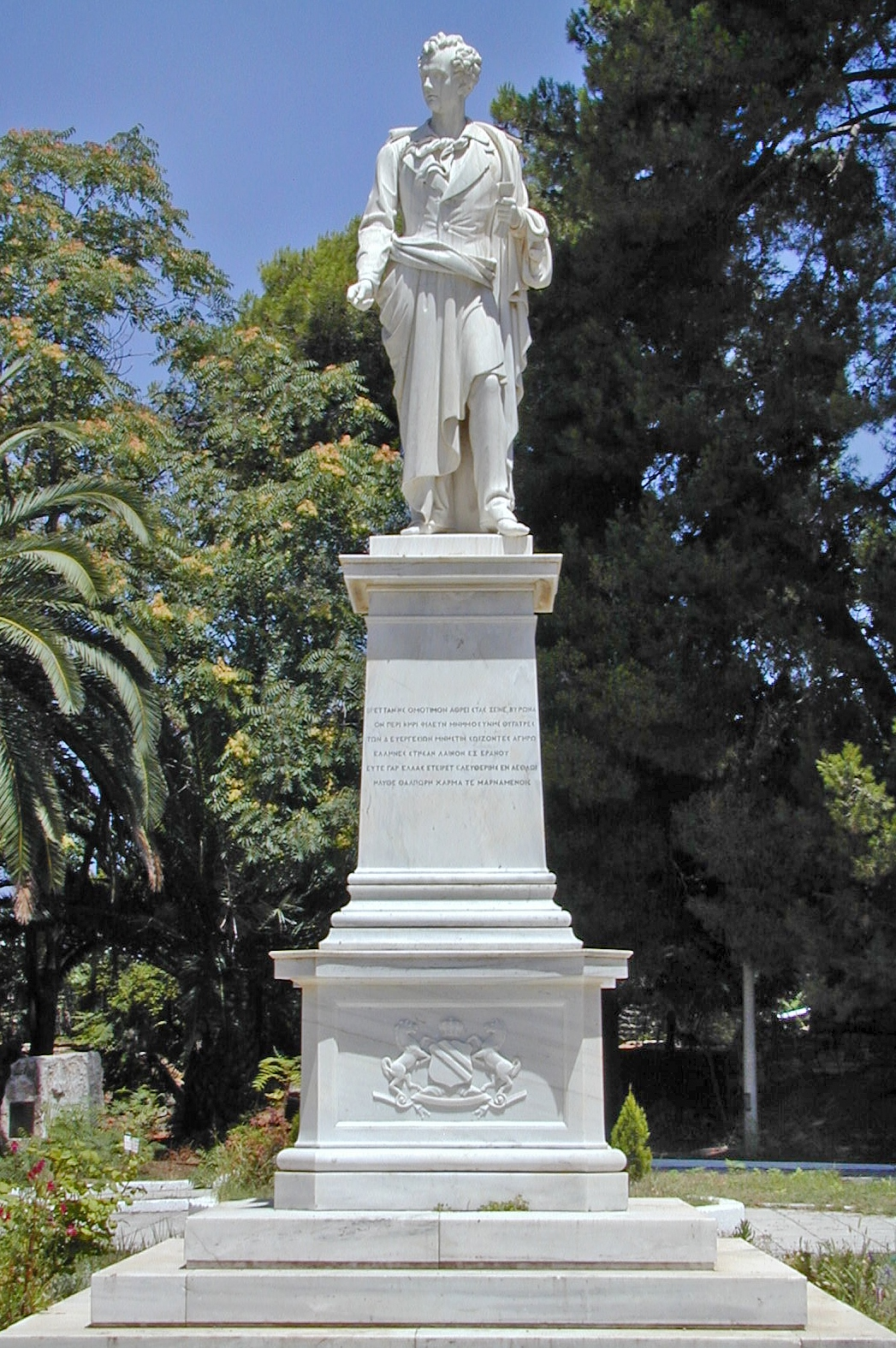

== See also ==
- List of settlements in Aetolia-Acarnania

== Sources ==
- Brooks, Allan (2013). Castles of Northwest Greece: From the Early Byzantine Period to the Eve of the First World War. Huddersfield: Aetos Press. ISBN 978-0-9575846-0-0.
- Christopoulos, Georgios A. & Bastias, Ioannis K., eds. (1975). Ιστορία του Ελληνικού Έθνους [History of the Greek Nation] (in Greek). Vol. ΙΒ: Η Ελληνική Επανάσταση (1821 - 1832) [The Greek Revolution (1821 - 1832)]. Athens: Ekdotiki Athinon. ISBN 978-960-213-108-4.
- Doganis, Th. (1929). Μεγάλη Στρατιωτικὴ καὶ Ναυτικὴ Ἐγκυκλοπαιδεία. Tόμος Τέταρτος: Καβάδης–Μωριάς [Great Military and Naval Encyclopaedia. Volume IV: Kavadh–Morea] (in Greek). Athens: Ἔκδοσις Μεγάλης Στρατιωτικῆς καὶ Ναυτικῆς Ἐγκυκλοπαιδείας. pp. 503–507. OCLC 31255024.
