= Thanasoulas Valtinos =

Greek revolutionary

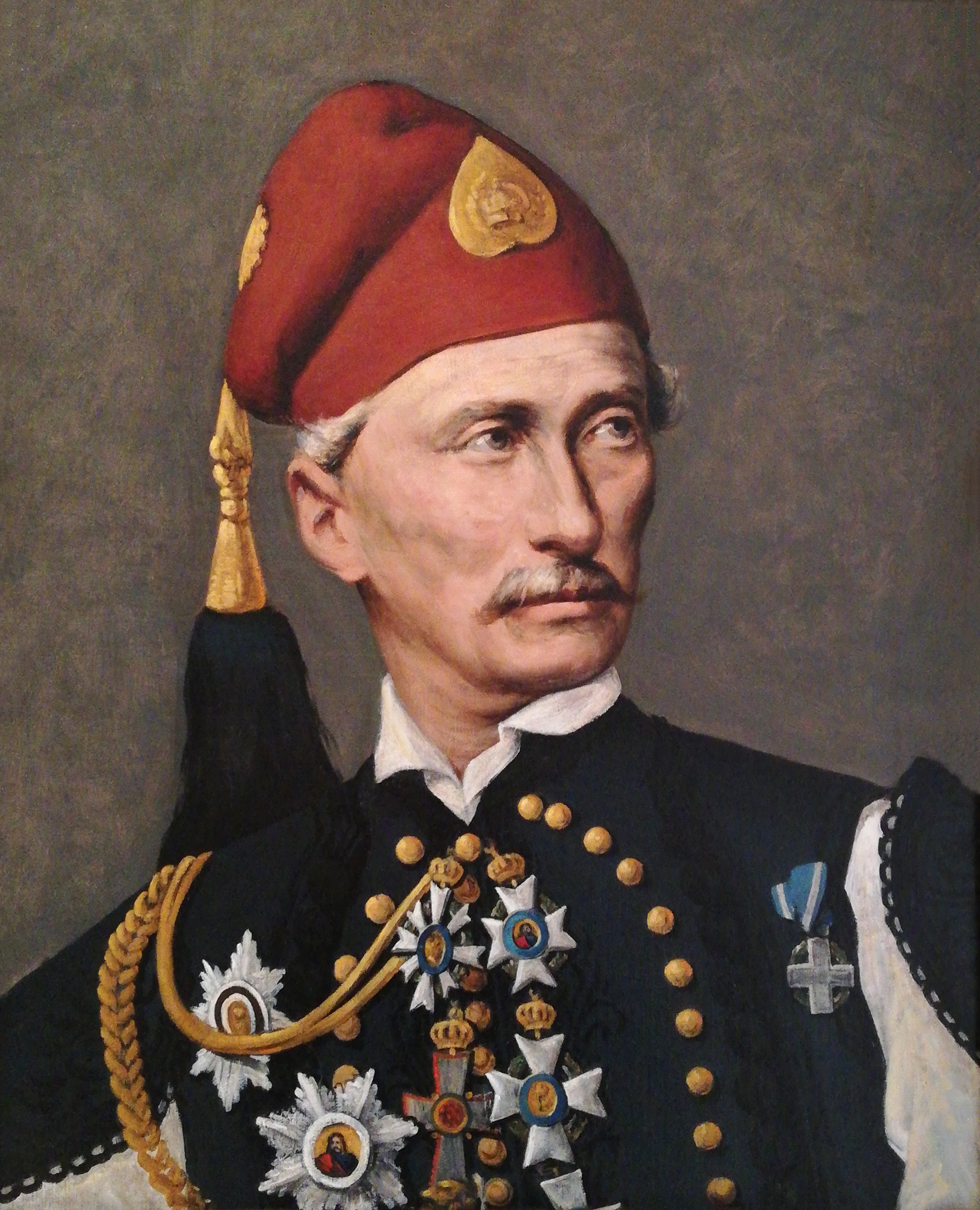
- Native name: Θανασούλας Βαλτινός
- Born: Athanasios Valtinos; Αθανάσιος Βαλτινός; 1801/02; Missolonghi, Sanjak of Karli-Eli, Ottoman Empire (now Greece)
- Died: 1870/77 Athens, Kingdom of Greece
- Allegiance: First Hellenic Republic; Kingdom of Greece
- Branch: Hellenic Army
- Conflicts: Greek War of Independence; Battle of Arachova; Siege of the Acropolis; Battle of Phaleron; Battle of Petra
- Awards: Grand Commander of the Order of the Redeemer
- Other work: Aide-de-camp to King Otto

Athanasios or Thanasoulas Valtinos (Greek: Θανασούλας Βαλτινός) was a Greek revolutionary of the Greek War of Independence.

== Biography ==
He was born in 1801 or 1802 in Messolonghi to a well-known revolutionist family, originating from Valtos Province. His father Ioannis was a servant of Ali Pasha. For this reason the infant Thanasoulas was thrown into a river by Kostas Lepeniotis, but was saved by some women and raised at the court of Ali Pasha, who gave him one of the most renowned figures of the modern Greek Enlightenment, Athanasios Psalidas, as his tutor.

Upon adulthood, Valtinos entered Ali Pasha's court until the latter's death. He was then held prisoner by the Ottomans in Ioannina until 1824. Then he was sent to Arta and on a secret mission on behalf of Omer Vrioni, but Valtinos instead joined Georgios Karaiskakis' army, supporting the rebel Greeks. Later, when Karaiskakis was killed, he joined the army of Demetrios Ypsilantis, fighting until the end of the Greek War of Independence, in 1829. Since 1855 he was aide-de-camp to King Otto, and followed him in his exile in Germany. He later returned to Athens, where he died in 1870 or 1877.

== Sources ==
- "Βαλτινός". ygeiaonline.gr. Εγκυκλοπαίδεια Δομή.
- "Βαλτινός, Θανασούλας (Αθανάσιος) (1802 - 1870)". Παγκόσμιο Βιογραφικό Λεξικό - Τόμος: 2. Εκδοτική Αθηνών.
