= Spyridon Trikoupis =

Greek statesman and diplomat (1788–1873)

- Σπυρίδων Τρικούπης
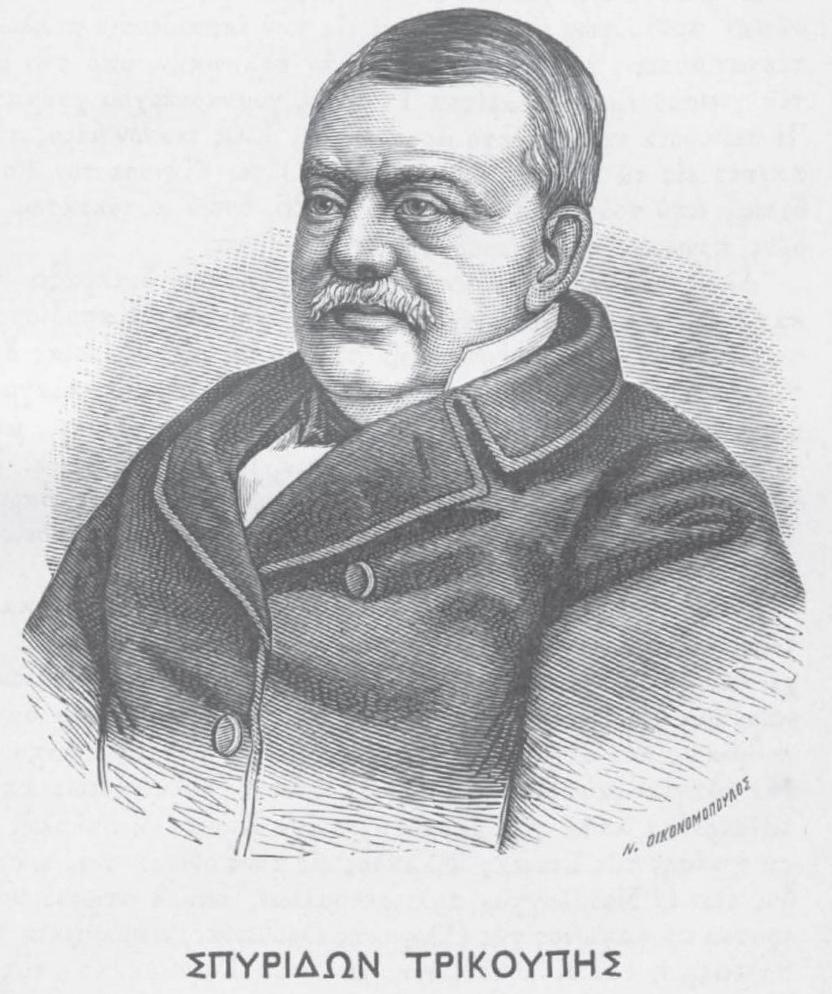

Prime Minister of Greece
- In office 25 January 1833 – 12 October 1833
- Monarch: Otto
- Regent: Josef Ludwig von Armansperg
- Preceded by: Georgios Kountouriotis (as President of the Administrative Committee of Greece (1832))
- Succeeded by: Alexandros Mavrokordatos

Personal details
- Born: 20 April 1788 Missolonghi, Ottoman Empire
- Died: 24 February 1873 (aged 84) Athens, Greece
- Party: English Party
- Children: Charilaos Trikoupis

Spiridon Trikoupis (Greek: Σπυρίδων Τρικούπης; 20 April 1788 – 24 February 1873) was a Greek statesman, diplomat, author and orator. He served as the first prime minister of Greece in 1833 and was a member of the provisional governments of Greece from 1826.

== Early life ==
He was born in Missolonghi and was son of the primate of Missolonghi, Ioannis Trikoupis. After studying in Paris and London, he became private secretary to Frederick North, 5th Earl of Guilford, Governor of the Ionian Islands.

== Political career ==
During the Greek War of Independence, he occupied several important administrative and diplomatic posts. He was a member of the provisional government in 1826, a member of the national convention at Troezen in 1827, and president of the council and minister of foreign affairs in 1832. He was appointed the first prime minister of Greece in 1833. He was thrice Greek minister (ambassador) to London (1834–1837, 1841–1843 and 1849–1862), and in 1850 envoy-extraordinary to Paris.

== Orations and history ==
His funeral oration for his friend Lord Byron, delivered in the cathedral of Missolonghi in 1824 was translated into many languages. A collection of his earlier religious and political orations was published in Paris in 1836. He was the author of Istoria tis Ellinikis Epanastaseos (London, 1853–1857), his work on the history of the Greek revolution.

== Children ==
He was the father of Charilaos Trikoupis, who also served as the prime minister of Greece.

Political offices
Preceded by None (civil war)	Prime Minister of Greece; 25 January – 12 October 1833	Succeeded by Alexandros Mavrokordatos
Diplomatic posts
Unknown	Greek Minister to the United Kingdom; 1834–1837	Unknown
Unknown	Greek Minister to the United Kingdom; 1841–1843	Unknown
Unknown	Greek Minister to the United Kingdom; 1849–1862	Unknown
