= Ellinika Chronika =

Newspaper

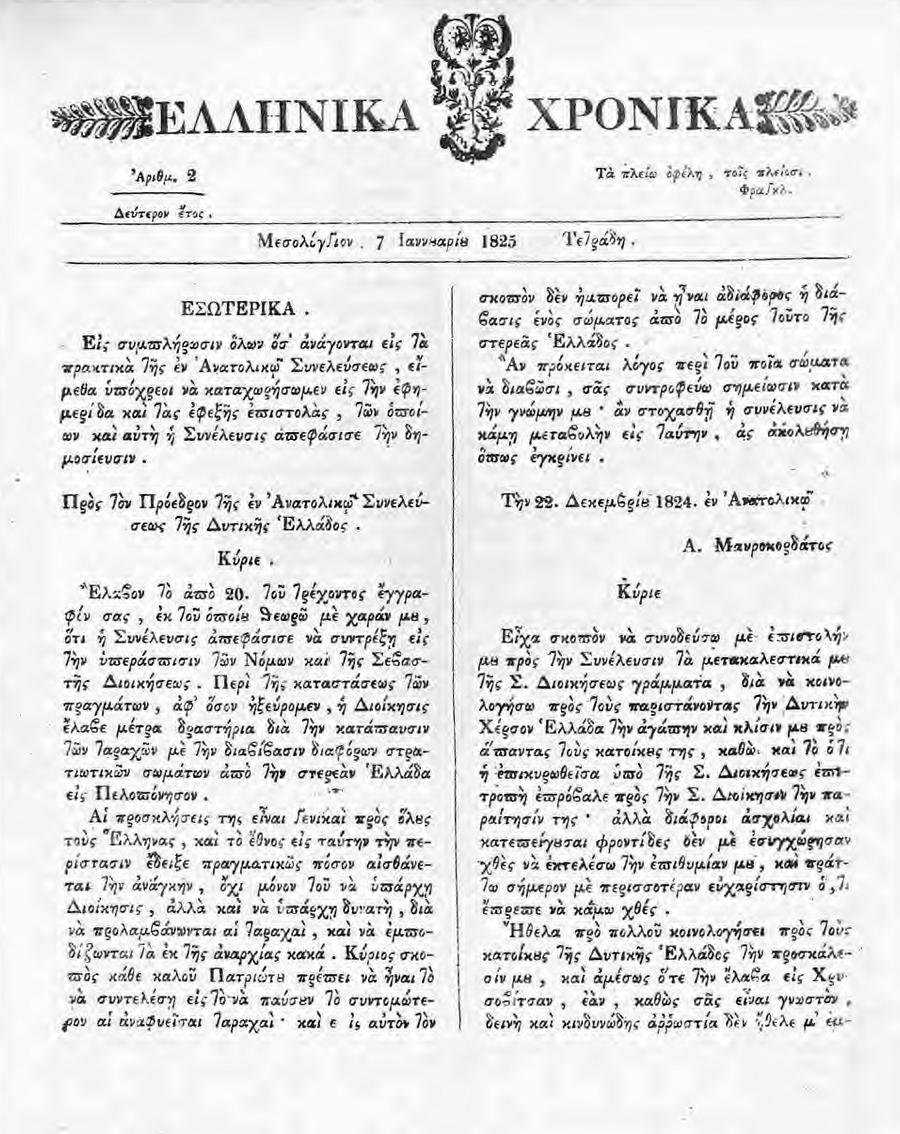
Ellinika Chronika issue of January 7, 1825

Ellinika Chronika (Greek: Ελληνικά Χρονικά, lit. 'Greek Chronicles') was the name of a newspaper published by the Swiss philhellene, Johann Jakob Meyer, in Missolonghi, during the Greek War of Independence.

On December 18, 1823, Mayer announced the newspaper's publication with a leaflet which also contained a Mayer's text and an extract of a Jeremy Bentham's essay about free press. On December 24, 1823, a special edition of Ellinika Chronika was printed and on January 1, 1824, its regular edition began. During 1824, 106 issues were published, followed by 105 in 1825, and further 15 from February 6 to February 20, 1826, when its print stopped. The newspaper had distributors in many Greek cities and abroad. The annual subscription fee cost 6 Spanish thalers. One hundred papers of every edition were distributed free to the Greeks.

In the newspaper were published announcements of the Greek administration, internal and external news and translated extracts about the Greek Revolution from European and American newspapers. Furthermore were published Meyer's and some Greek politicians' articles about democracy and monarchy, freedom, free press etc, letters of philhellenic committees and subscribers' letters as well as poetry.

Usually the newspaper had four pages but sometimes, when there was a lot of material, it had five and six pages. Its dimensions were 24,5 × 20.

Today the archive of Ellinika Chronika is found at the Library of the Greek Parliament.
