= Senate of Western Continental Greece =

Historical legislature in Greece

Western Continental Greece Δυτική Χέρσος Ελλάς
- 1821–1823
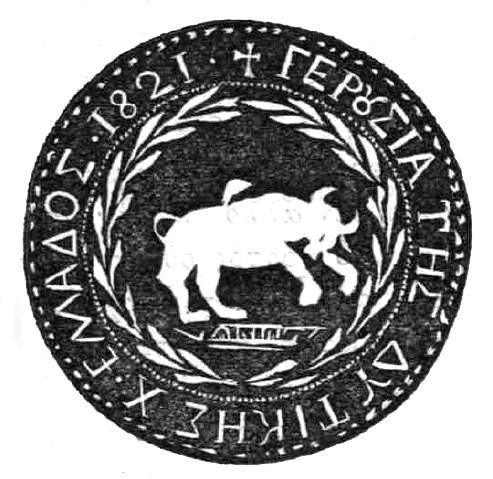
- Seal of the Senate of Western Greece
- Status: Regional government in revolt against the Ottoman Empire
- Capital: Missolonghi
- Common languages: Greek
- Religion: Greek Orthodox
- Government: Republic
- Legislature: Senate
- History
  - Established: 9 November 1821
  - Disestablished: 30 March 1823
Preceded by	Succeeded by
Karli-Eli	First Hellenic Republic

The Senate of Western Continental Greece (Greek: Γερουσία της Δυτικής Χέρσου Ελλάδος) was a provisional regime that existed in western Central Greece during the early stages of the Greek War of Independence.

== History ==
The western part of Central Greece had rebelled against Ottoman rule in spring 1821, along with the rest of southern Greece. In order to organize the administration of the region, an assembly was to be convened at Vrachori on 1 October, but it was eventually postponed for 4–9 November 1821, at Missolonghi. The assembly included 30 representatives from the region and voted for the creation of a constitutional charter (Οργανισμός Δυτικής Χέρσου Ελλάδος) that provided for the creation of a ten-member Senate to administer the affairs of the region until such time as a centralized administration for the entire nation was established, with the Phanariot Alexandros Mavrokordatos, who presided over the assembly and had drafted most of the charter, elected as its president.

The charter of Western Greece was the first of the Greek local statutes, followed by the Legal Order of Eastern Continental Greece on 15 November and the charter of the Peloponnesian Senate on 15 December. The Senate was dissolved at the Second National Assembly at Astros in March 1823.
