= Johann Jakob Meyer =

Swiss editor and journalist

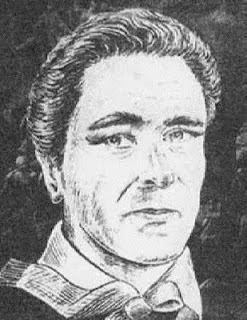
Johann Jakob Meyer

Johann Jakob Meyer (30 December 1798 in Zürich – 11 April 1826 in Missolonghi) was a Swiss editor and journalist.

He is best remembered as a philhellene and for his research in Greek history and culture. He also published works studying sexual activity in Ancient India.
