= Christodoulos Hatzipetros =

Greek military leader

- Χριστόδουλος Χατζηπέτρος
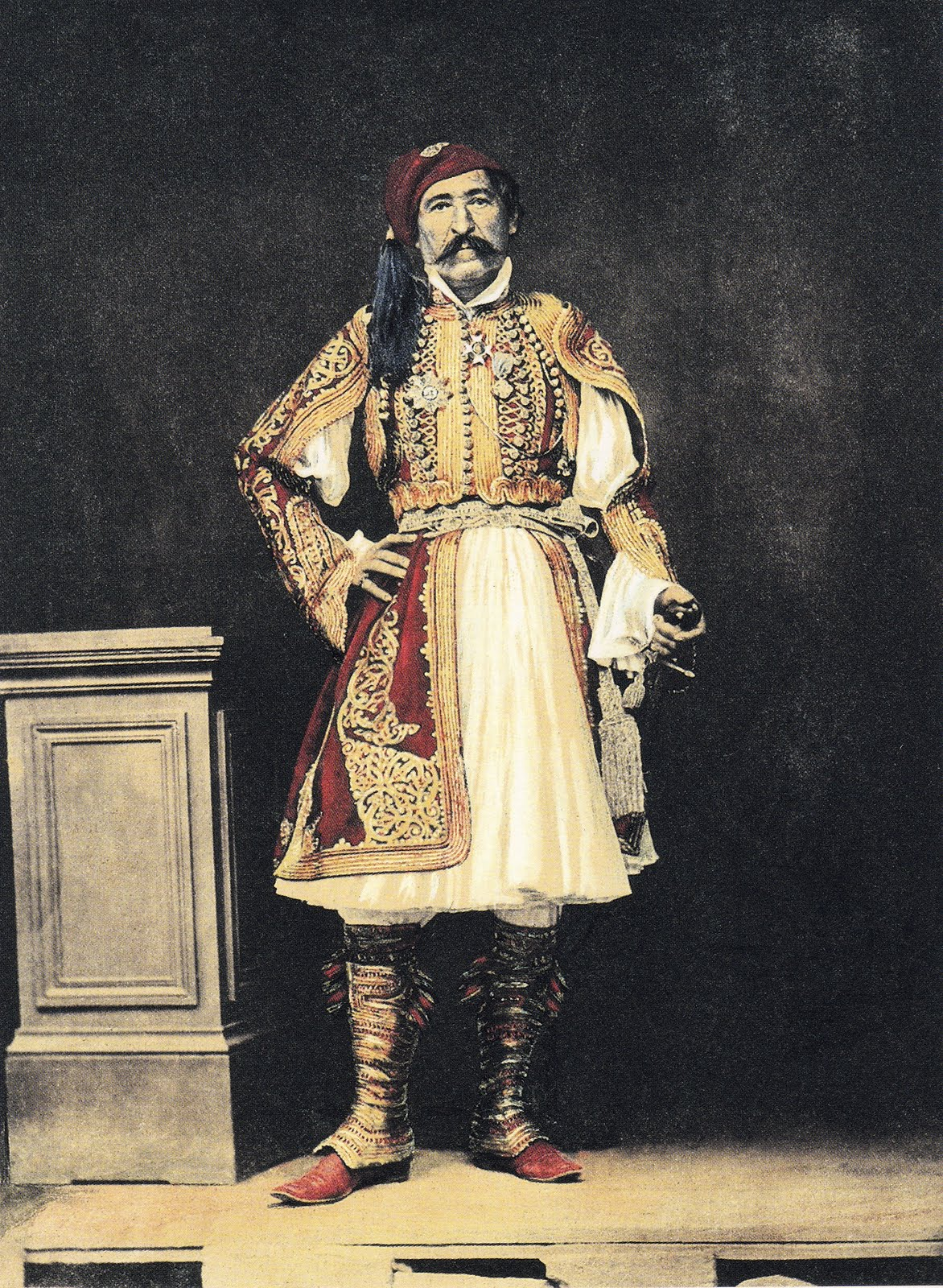
- Hatzipetros in Royal Phalanx uniform, 1855.
- Born: 10 May 1799; Veternikon, Sanjak of Trikala, Ottoman Empire (now Neraidochori, Greece)
- Died: 29 October 1869 (aged 70); Athens, Kingdom of Greece
- Military career
- Allegiance: First Hellenic Republic; Kingdom of Greece
- Service years: 1819–1869
- Rank: Major General
- Commands: Commander of the Royal Phalanx of Eastern Greece
- Wars: Greek War of Independence: Battle of Neokastron; Battle of Arachova; Crimean War: Epirus Revolt of 1854
- Other work: Aide-de-Camp to Otto of Greece; Aide-de-Camp to George I of the Hellenes

Christodoulos Hatzipetros (Greek: Χριστόδουλος Χατζηπέτρος, 10 May 1799 – 29 October 1869) was a Greek military leader during the Greek War of Independence, who became a general and adjutant to King Otto of Greece after Independence.

== Life ==
Hatzipetros was born in 1799, into a rich Aromanian family of Kodjabashis in the village of Veternikon (modern Neraidochori) in western Thessaly. He initially followed his family's trade, spending time as a merchant in Serres, Salonica and Vienna. In 1819 he became a member of the Filiki Etaireia. When the Greek War of Independence broke out in 1821 he immediately joined the rebels' ranks, and alongside Nikolaos Stournaras scored a number of early successes against the Ottoman forces in Thessaly. Hatzipetros served throughout the war, serving both in Central Greece and the Peloponnese under Kitsos Tzavellas and Georgios Karaiskakis, fighting with particular distinction in the battles of Neokastron and Arachova. Under Ioannis Kapodistrias, he was named a chiliarch, and under King Otto of Greece commander of the Royal Phalanx (a corps of veteran fighters of the War of Independence) of Eastern Greece.

Eventually, he rose to the rank of Major General and the post of aide-de-camp to Otto, but his inveterate womanizing led him to become involved in several sexual scandals (such as his notorious affair with Jane Digby) and caused him trouble with Queen Amalia, who demanded his dismissal from the court. In 1854, during the Crimean War, while Greece was officially neutral, he was charged with leading the invasion of Ottoman-ruled Thessaly at the head of irregular forces. Despite early successes, he was defeated and nearly captured by the Ottoman army near Kalambaka. He then continued to lead a guerrilla in the region until the occupation of Piraeus by the British and French forced the Greek government to recall its forces.

Hatzipetros remained aide-de-camp to Otto until the latter's ouster in 1862, and was then made honorary aide-de-camp to the new king, George I, until his death on 29 October 1869 (O.S.).
