= Karaiskakis (disambiguation) =

Karaiskakis may refer to:

== People with the surname ==
- Georgios Karaiskakis (1782–1827), Greek Revolutionary
- Spyridon Karaiskakis (1825–1899), Greek politician and military person
- Georgios Karaiskakis (chieftain), Greek revolutionary chieftain of the Macedonian Struggle

== Other uses ==
- Karaiskakis Stadium, Football stadium in Piraeus, Attica, Greece
  - Karaiskakis Stadium disaster, 1981 fatal incident in Piraeus, Greece
- A.E. Karaiskakis F.C., Greek football club
- Georgios Karaiskakis (municipality)
