= Gardikiotis Grivas =

Greek revolutionist

Alexios - Gardikiotis Grivas
- Αλέξιος - Γαρδικιώτης Γρίβας
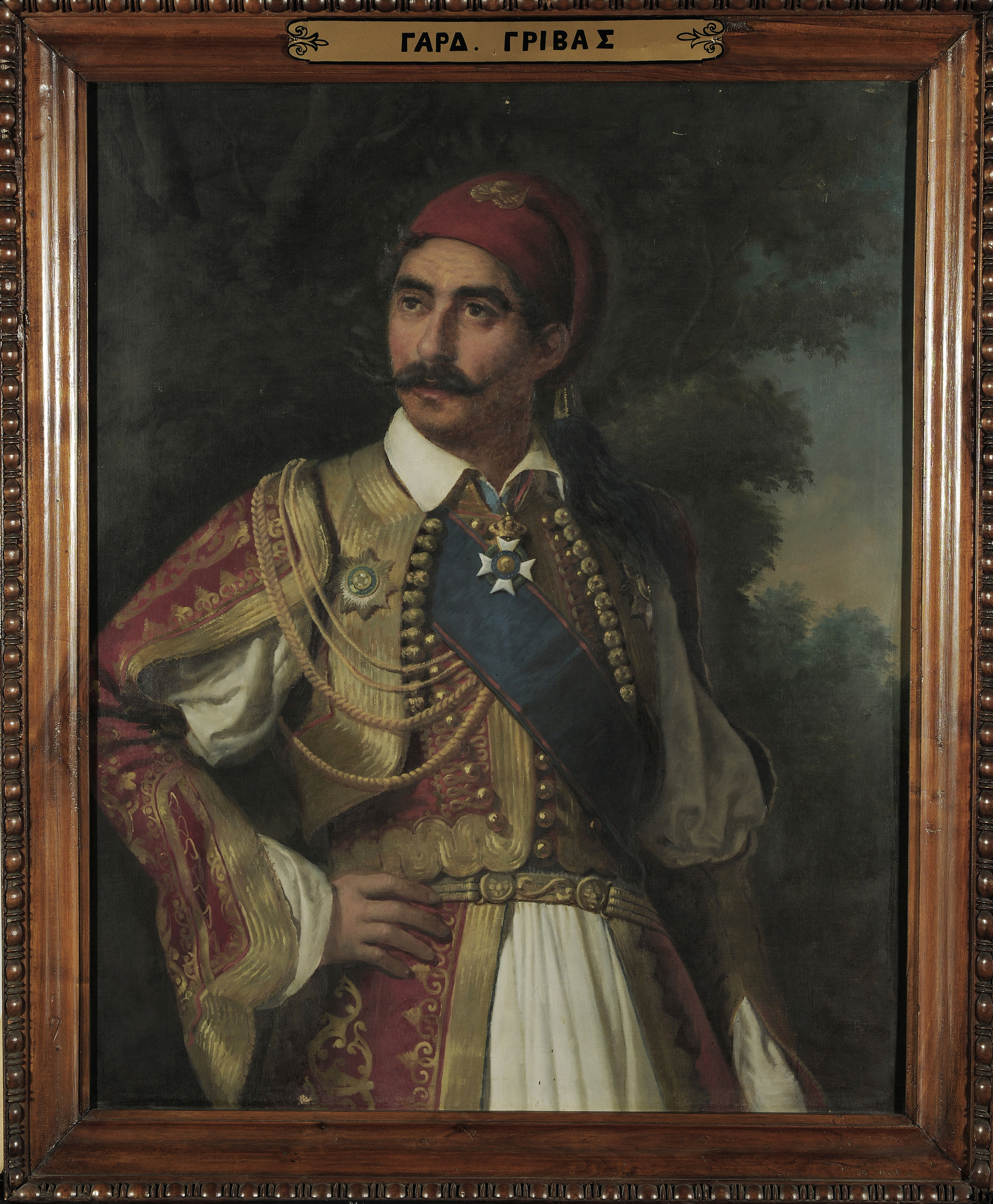
- Gardikiotis Grivas
- Born: c. 1803; Athens, Attica, Ottoman Empire (now Greece)
- Died: 23 April 1855 (aged 51-52); Greece
- Military career
- Allegiance: (Greece) First Hellenic Republic
- Branch: Greek Revolutionary Army
- Service years: 1821–1843
- Conflicts: Greek War of Independence: Battle of Arachova

Gardikiotis Grivas (1803 – 23 April 1855), was a Greek leader in the Greek War of Independence in 1821. He distinguished himself in many battles, especially in the Battle of Arachova. He also served as Othon 's aide, undertaking to deal with the movement of 3 September 1843, as well as the rebellion of his brother, Theodoros Grivas.

== Family ==
He belonged to the historical family of the Grivai, for which there are references as early as 300 years before the revolution (around 1500). His father was Dimitrios or Drakos Grivas and his brothers were Christos, Floros or Kostas, Stavros and the marshal Theodoros Grivas. His father, a former charioteer of Vonitsis and Xiromero, was poisoned by Ali Pasha, because he did not want to move against the village of Gardiki. Of his brothers, Christos fought in many battles in Sterea and Peloponnese, and Floros fought in the battle of Peta. Theodore was the most prominent, while Stavros served under Theodore and later colluded with him against Otho. Alexios, who is known by the nickname Gardikiotis, the youngest of them all, was born in 1803.

== Greek war of Independence (1821) ==
When the Revolution of 1821 was declared, he was 18 years old and took part in it together with his brothers. Gardikiotis Grivas took part in many battles. On the side of Karaiskakis, he participated in all the battles that took place in and around Attica. He particularly distinguished himself in the battle of Arachova (18-14 November 1826), when, sent by Karaiskakis to block the crossing of the Ottoman forces, he managed to enter the city with Georgios Vagias and 500 men first and occupy the most fortified positions, before the arrival of the Turkish forces. In Attica he participated in the conquest of Keratsini, Metochi and Piraeus, where he rose to prominence. Then the commander-in-chief of the ground forces Richard Church gave him the office of centurion. By the spring of 1828 he had gathered 664 men on his side, who came mainly from Aetoloakarnania. He himself, was appointed by the Government as centurion of the 1st Brigade and with this office he participated in the occupation - for the second time - of Vonitsa, in December 1828, together with centurions Dimos Tselios, Georgios Tsogas, Costas Vlachopoulos and others.

== Post-revolution ==
Grivas, having the position of King Othon's assistant, tried to prevent the rebellion of 3 September 1843, but failed. At the same time, he was sent to suppress the rebellion that his brother declared. A decade or so later, in 1854, he assumed the position of commander of the army of western Central Greece. In the same year, however, following the demand of Kallergis, he ceased to be an assistant to the king.

== Personal life ==
Grivas died in 1855. Throughout his life, he remained faithful to the laws and the government of Greece. Unlike his brother, he did not participate in revolutionary movements against the government. In fact, he opposed him.

== Bibliography ==
- Βακαλόπουλος, Α. (1975). Η Επανάσταση κατά το 1826. Ιστορία του ελληνικού έθνους – Τόμος 12: Η ελληνική επανάσταση και η ίδρυση του ελληνικού κράτους (1813-1822) (σελ. 408-436). Αθήνα: Εκδοτική Αθηνών.
- Δεσποτόπουλος, Α. (1975). Η επανάσταση κατά το 1828. Ιστορία του ελληνικού έθνους – Τόμος 12: Η ελληνική επανάσταση και η ίδρυση του ελληνικού κράτους (1813-1822) (σελ. 478-491). Αθήνα: Εκδοτική Αθηνών.
- Κανδηλώρος, Τ. (χ.χ.). Γρίβας. Ελευθερουδάκης Σύγχρονος εγκυκλοπαίδεια, (4η έκδ.) Τόμος 4 (σελ. 158-159). Αθήνα: Ν. Νίκας.
- Μαυρομμάτης Ξ. (χ.χ.). Γρίβας, Αλέξης ή Γαρδικιώτης. Στο: Δρανδάκης, Μεγάλη ελληνική εγκυκλοπαίδεια, (2η έκδ.) Τόμος 8 (σελ. 733). Αθήνα: Εκδοτικός οργανισμός "Ο φοίνιξ".
- Παπαδόπουλος, Σ. (1975). Ο Κριμαϊκός πόλεμος και ο Ελληνισμός. Ιστορία του ελληνικού έθνους – Τόμος 13: Νεώτερος Ελληνισμός από 1833 ως 1881 (σελ. 143-168). Αθήνα: Εκδοτική Αθηνών.
- Παπαλεξάνδρου Κ. & Σαραντάκος Μ. (Επιμ.). Γρίβας. Νεώτερον εγκυκλοπαιδικόν λεξικόν, Τόμος 5. Αθήνα: Ήλιος.
- Πετρόπουλος, Ι.& Κουμαριανού, Α. (1975). Περίοδος βασιλείας του Όθωνος 1833-1862. Ιστορία του ελληνικού έθνους – Τόμος 13: Νεώτερος Ελληνισμός από 1833 ως 1881 (σελ. 8-105). Αθήνα: Εκδοτική Αθηνών.
