= Zervas =

Zervas is a Greek surname. Notable people with the surname include:

- Annella Zervas (1900–1926), American nun
- Arizona Zervas (born 1995), American rapper, singer, and composer
- Konstantinos Zervas, Greek politician and mayor of Thessaloniki
- Leonidas Zervas (1902–1980), Greek organic chemist
- Napoleon Zervas (1891–1957), Greek general and resistance leader
- Nikolaos Zervas (1800–1869), Greek general
