= Ioannis Rangos =

Greek soldier

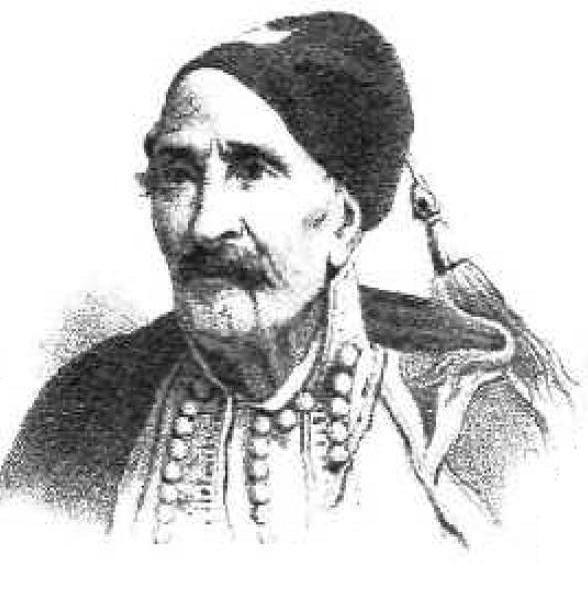
Ioannis Rangos

Ioannis or Yannakis Rangos (Greek: Ιωάννης/Γιαννάκης Ράγκος; 1790–1870) was a Greek armatolos of the 19th century and fighter in the Greek War of Independence.

== Biographical information ==
He was born in 1790 in Syntekno of Valtos Province. His father was the armatolos Georgios Rangos. In 1808 he was captured by Ali Pasha and his family was persecuted. However Ali later released him with his family and gave him power and honors. When Ali Pasha incurred the wrath of the Sultan in 1820, Rangos, who in the meantime had been initiated into the secrets of the Filiki Eteria, started a campaign pretending to go to reinforce the beleaguered Ali Pasha.

When the Greek Revolution broke out, Rangos was ready and willing to fight, contributing much to the surrender of the fortress to the Souliotes. Thereafter, he reached an agreement with Gogos Bakolas, captain of Radovitsi, and fought at Stavros against a great number of Ottomans, killing most.

Ioannis Rangos was distinguished for his adaptability and his ability to shift allegiance to the most powerful men of the day, like Demetrios Ypsilantis, Alexandros Mavrokordatos, and Ioannis Kapodistrias, eventually managing to climb to senior military positions. In 1822 he was appointed as leader of the expedition to Thessaly. He fought with Georgios Karaiskakis and was distinguished. In 1823 he was entrusted by the government with tracking Karaiskakis, who in the meanwhile had defected. For his services, they conceded him the armatoluk of Agrafa and the rank of general. In 1824 he helped Messolonghi against the large army of Omer Pasha.

He was elected as a delegate of the troops in the Assembly of Messolonghi, and he represented the generals of western Greece in the National Assembly of Astros. Under the government of Ioannis Kapodistrias, Ioannis Rangos restored his military prestige by affiliating himself with Augustinos Kapodistrias, Plenipotentiary Lieutenant of the government in Continental Greece, and receiving the position of colonel of the Light Battalions of Eastern Continental Greece. After the assassination of Kapodistrias, he lost his position. During the reign of Otto of Greece, he participated in movements against the king and was imprisoned.

During the reign of King George I of Greece, he was named a member of the committee for the grievances of fighters of the Revolution. He spent the last years of his life in Messolonghi, occupied with the local political life of Aitoliko in which he had settled after the death of Kapodistrias.

== Bibliography ==
- Papageorgiou St., Το Αρχείο Γιαννάκη Ράγκου, Historical and Ethnological Society of Greece, Athens 1982.
