= Georgios Vagias =

Greek general during the Greek War of Independence

Georgios Vagias (Greek: Γεώργιος Βάγιας) was a Greek general during the Greek War of Independence (1821–1830).

Vagias was born in Lekel, Ottoman Empire, modern southern Albania. He participated in several conflicts during the Greek revolution that led to the independence of Greece. His activity was focused on western Central Greece and the Peloponnese. In 1825 Vagias was promoted to general of the Greek revolutionary army.

He participated in a number of major conflicts such as the Second Siege of Missolonghi (1823) under Kitsos Tzavelas and the Battle of Domvraina. He also fought in the Battle of Arachova (1826) under commanding general Georgios Karaiskakis. There Vagias together with revolutionary leader, Gardikiotis Grivas, commanded a force of 500 men and succeeded in annihilating an invading unit of 1,500 Ottoman-Albanians.
