= Spyridon Karaiskakis =

Greek politician and military person (1825–1899)

- Σπυρίδων Καραϊσκάκης
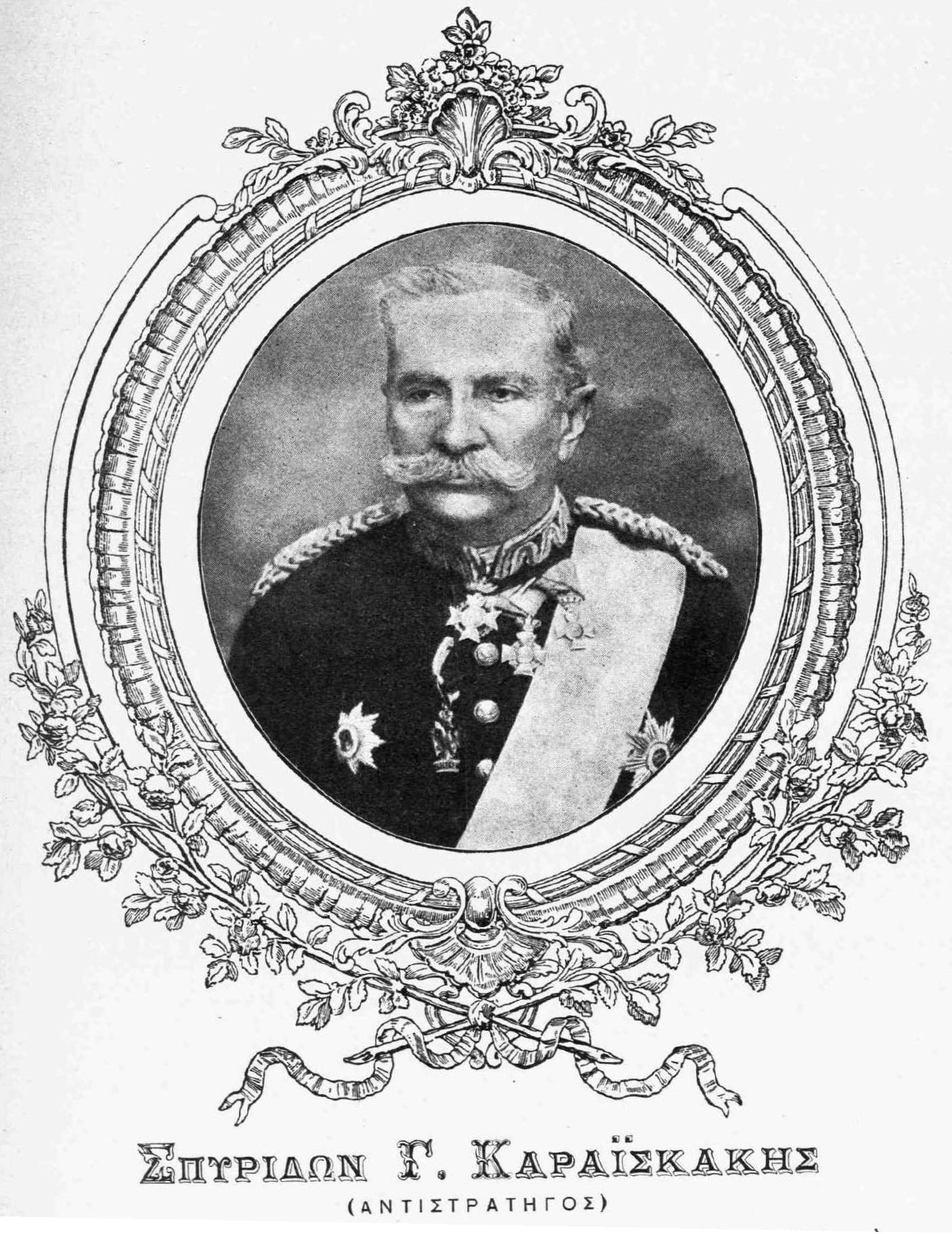
- A portrait of Spyridon Karaiskakis

Minister of Military Affairs
- In office 15 March 1882 – 1884
- Monarch: George I
- Prime Minister: Charilaos Trikoupis
- In office 22 March – 25 October 1880
- Monarch: George I
- Prime Minister: Charilaos Trikoupis
- In office 2 – 7 November 1878
- Monarch: George I
- Prime Minister: Charilaos Trikoupis
- In office 27 October 1875 – 8 December 1876
- Monarch: George I
- Prime Minister: Alexandros Koumoundouros

Member of Parliament for Evrytania
- In office 1875–1884
- Monarch: George I
- Prime Minister: Charilaos Trikoupis; Alexandros Koumoundouros; Epameinondas Deligeorgis; Konstantinos Kanaris

Member of Parliament for Valtos Province
- In office 1865–1868
- Monarch: George I
- Prime Minister: Alexandros Koumoundouros; Epameinondas Deligeorgis; Dimitrios Voulgaris; Benizelos Roufos; Aristeidis Moraitinis

Personal details
- Born: 1825 Ithaca, United States of the Ionian Islands (now Greece)
- Died: 1899 (aged 73–74) Athens, Kingdom of Greece
- Relations: Dimitrios Karaiskakis (brother); Penelope Karaiskaki (sister); Eleni Karaiskaki (sister)
- Children: Georgios S. Karaiskakis
- Parent(s): Georgios Karaiskakis; Engolpia Skylodimou
- Education: Hellenic Army Academy
- Awards: Grand Cross of the Order of the Redeemer

Military service
- Allegiance: Kingdom of Greece
- Branch/service: Hellenic Army
- Years of service: 1842-1896
- Rank: Lieutenant General
- Commands: Head of Athens National Guard; Garrison Commander of Corfu; Commander of III Army Headquarters in Arta
- Battles/wars: Crimean War; Epirus Revolt

Spyridon Karaiskakis (Greek: Σπυρίδων Καραϊσκάκης; 1825 – 1899) was a Hellenic Army officer and politician, the son of Georgios Karaiskakis.

== Early life ==
He was born in 1825 at Kalamos on the island of Ithaca, as the son of Georgios Karaiskakis, one of the chief leaders of the Greek War of Independence, and Engolpia Skylodimou. In 1833, King Otto of Greece sent sixty orphaned children of War of Independence fighters, Karaiskakis among them, to be educated at Munich. Karaiskakis returned to Greece after a year, and attended a Greek high school.

== Military and political career ==
After graduation, he entered the Hellenic Army Academy in 1842. In 1846, he participated in an insurrection at the Academy, resulting in his expulsion. Nevertheless, in 1849 he enlisted in the Mountain Guard as a second lieutenant.

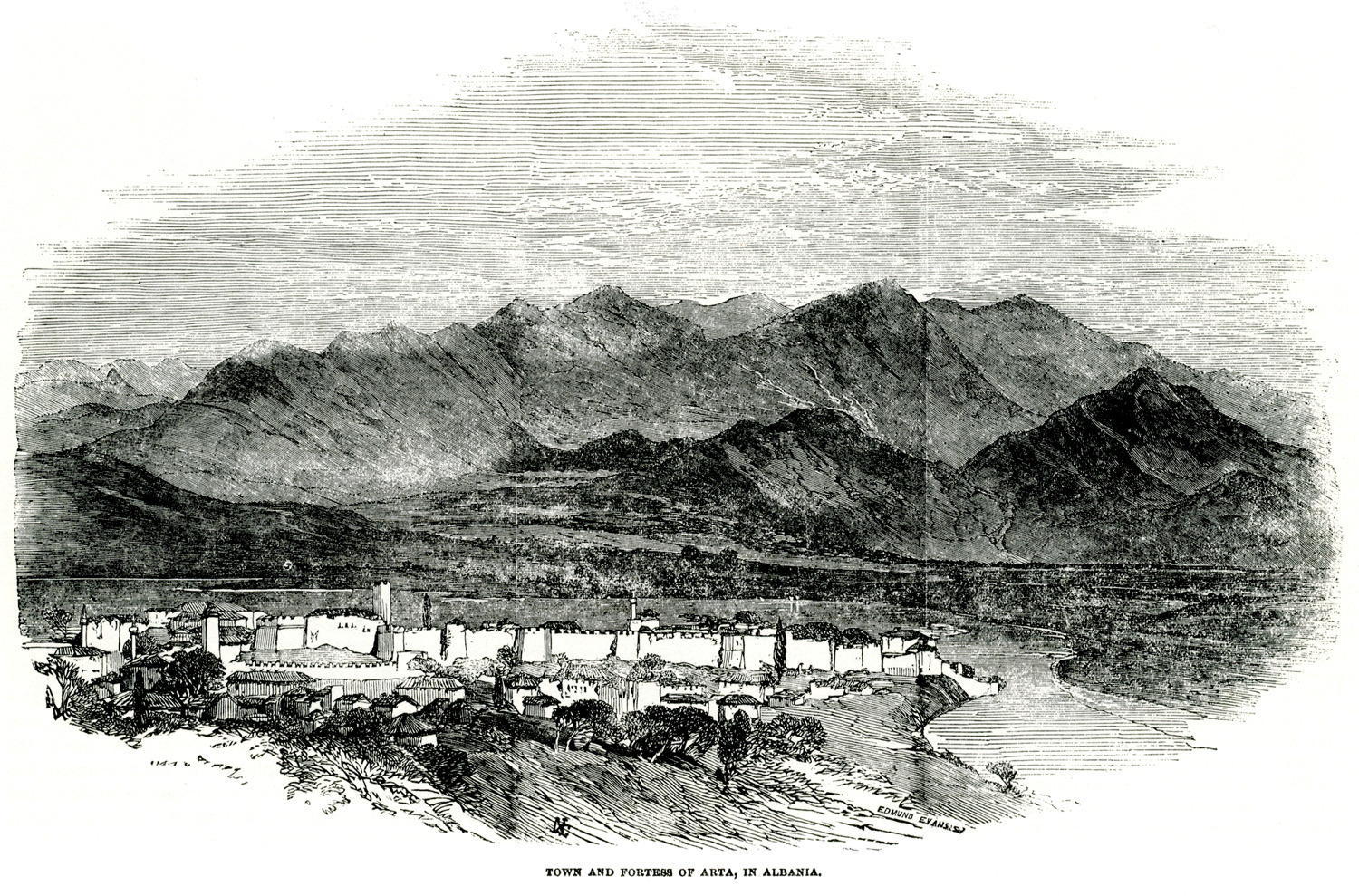
View of Arta in 1854

In 1854, during the Crimean War, Karaiskakis left his post in the Hellenic Army and crossed into Ottoman territory to take part in the anti-Ottoman uprising in Epirus, leading the siege of Arta by the rebels. After the revolt was suppressed, he returned to Greece. He was promoted to lieutenant and scored some success in anti-brigand operations, before being appointed aide-de-camp to King Otto in 1856. He was promoted to captain in 1859. When Otto was overthrown in 1862, Karaiskakis followed him into exile to Munich.

After the election of King George I, he returned to Greece, and in 1864 he was elected as head of the Athens National Guard. In the 1865 elections, he was elected to the Hellenic Parliament for the Valtos Province, serving until 1868. In the 1875 elections he was again elected an MP for Evrytania, which he held until he resigned his seat in 1884. During this time, he served as Minister for Military Affairs under Alexandros Koumoundouros in 1875, and Charilaos Trikoupis in 1878, 1880, and 1882.

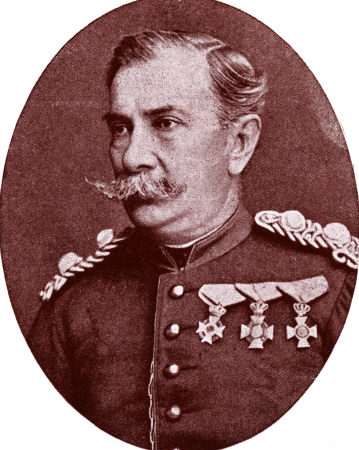
A photograph of Spyridon Karaiskakis

After his resignation in 1884, he was appointed garrison commander of Corfu, with the rank of colonel. In 1888, he was appointed commander of the III Army Headquarters in Arta.

He retired from service on 13 November 1896 (O.S.), with the rank of lieutenant general.

== Family ==
In 1860, he married the only daughter of Georgios Varvakis (son of the wealthy merchant and benefactor Ioannis Varvakis). The couple had a son, Georgios S. Karaiskakis.
