= Nikolaos Zervas =

Greek general

- Νικόλαος Ζέρβας
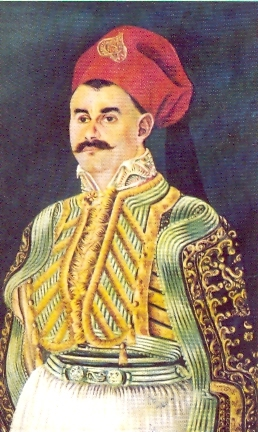
- Zervas in the Royal Phalanx uniform.
- Born: c. 1800; Souli, Pashalik of Yanina, Ottoman Empire (now Greece)
- Died: c. 1869 (aged 68–69); Agrinio, Kingdom of Greece
- Military career
- Allegiance: First Hellenic Republic; Kingdom of Greece
- Branch: Hellenic Army
- Service years: 1821–1854
- Rank: Major General
- Units: Souliote Forces; Royal Phalanx
- Conflicts: Greek War of Independence: Battle of Phaleron; Greek civil wars of 1823-1825; Crimean War: Epirus Revolt of 1854

Nikolaos Zervas (Greek: Νικόλαος Ζέρβας, 1800–1869) was a Greek revolutionary and Souliote captain in the Greek War of Independence. After the establishment of Greek independence he reached the rank of general in the Hellenic Army.

Zervas was born in Souli, Epirus, then Ottoman Empire, and became one of the leaders of the Souliotes. Zervas participated in the Greek War of Independence (1821–1830) and distinguished at the Battle of Phaleron (April 1827). At March 1828, together with another revolutionary leader, Dimos Tselios, managed to push back an advancing Ottoman (Turkish-Albanian) force at Menidi, Attica.

After Independence, Zervas participated in an anti-monarchist revolt in Acarnania (1836). At 1854, already a Major General in the Hellenic Army, he resigned his post and joined General Theodoros Grivas in the Epirus revolt of 1854. The revolt aimed at the union of Epirus with the Kingdom of Greece, but failed.
