= Skoulikaria, Arta =

Village in Epirus, Greece

Coordinates: 39°10′N 21°16′E

Skoulikaria (Greek: Σκουληκαριά) is a mountainous village in the municipality of Georgios Karaiskakis, in Greece, with 273 permanent residents (2011 census) at an altitude of 973 meters. It is located about 44 km away from the town of Arta.

Under the Kapodistrias reform, in force until the end of 2010, Skoulikaria was a municipal area of the newly formed municipality of Georgios Karaiskakis-based Diasello. Under the new administrative division of the Kallikratis Plan, Skoulikaria joined the extended Georgios Karaiskakis municipality, which was formed through the merger of the pre-existing municipalities of Irakleia, Karaiskakis and Tetrafilia. Skoulikaria along with Giannioti and Agia Paraskevi make up the local community Skoulikaria with a total population of 441 people.

== History ==
Skoulikaria is the birthplace of the general of the Greek War of Independence Georgios Karaiskakis.

== Events ==
Karaiskakeia (in honor of Commander Georgios Karaiskakis) - Penultimate Sunday of July each year in Skoulikaria (his hometown).

Provatina celebration each year (June) in collaboration with cultural associassions, the plateau - Gavrogou- in Skoulikaria.
