= Jane Digby =

English aristocrat and courtesan (1807–1881)

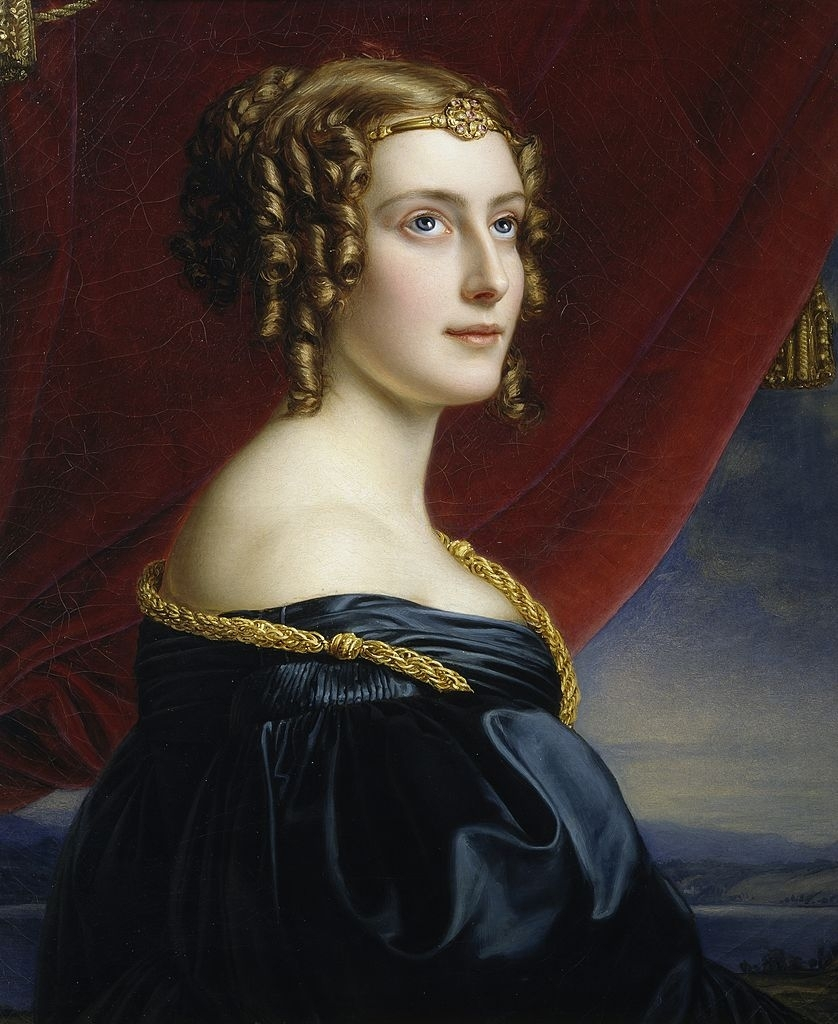
- Portrait of Jane Digby by Joseph Karl Stieler, 1831
- Born: 3 April 1807; Forston House, Dorset, England
- Died: 11 August 1881 (aged 74); Damascus, Vilayet of Syria, Ottoman Empire (now Syria)
- Resting place: Damascus, Syria
- Other names: Jane Elizabeth Digby el Mezrab; Shaikhah Umm al-Laban
- Title: Lady Ellenborough (1824–1830); Baroness von Venningen (1833–1842)
- Spouses: Edward Law (m. 1824; div. 1830) Baron Karl von Venningen (m. 1833; div. 1842) Spyridon Theotokis (m. 1841; div. 1846) Medjuel el Mezrab (m. 1853)
- Children: 6
- Parent(s): Admiral Sir Henry Digby; Lady Jane Elizabeth Coke

Jane Elizabeth Digby (3 April 1807 – 11 August 1881) was an English aristocrat, famed for her remarkable love life and lifestyle. She had four husbands and many lovers, including Lord Ellenborough, Governor-General of India, King Ludwig I of Bavaria and his son King Otto of Greece, Bohemian nobleman and Austrian statesman Prince Felix zu Schwarzenberg, and the Greek general Christodoulos Hatzipetros. She died in Damascus, then part of the Ottoman Empire, as the wife of Arab sheikh Medjuel el Mezrab, who was 20 years her junior.

== Life ==
Jane Elizabeth Digby was born in Holkham Hall, Norfolk, on 3 April 1807, daughter of an Admiral, Sir Henry Digby, and his wife, Lady Jane Elizabeth Coke. Jane's father seized the Spanish treasure ship Santa Brígida in the action of 16 October 1799 and his share of the prize money established the family fortune. Holkham Hall was the family seat of her maternal grandfather Thomas Coke, Earl of Leicester. In 1815 her father inherited and settled in Minterne House and estate, Dorset.

=== Marriages, scandal, and affairs ===
Digby was first married to Edward Law, 2nd Baron Ellenborough (later Earl of Ellenborough), who became Governor General of India, on 15 October 1824. They had one son, Arthur Dudley Law (15 February 1828 – 1 February 1830), who died in infancy. After successive affairs with her maternal cousin Colonel George Anson and Prince Felix of Schwarzenberg, she was divorced from Lord Ellenborough in 1830 by an act of Parliament. This caused a considerable scandal at the time. Digby had two children with Prince Felix: Mathilde "Didi" Selden (born 12 November 1829 Basel, Switzerland, and raised by Felix's sister), who married Czech aristocrat Baron Anton Bieschin zu Bieschin (1814–1898), and Felix Selden (born December 1830 Paris, France), who died just a few weeks after his birth. The affair with Felix ended shortly after the death of their son.

She then moved on to Germany and became the lover of Ludwig I of Bavaria. In Munich, she met Baron Karl Theodor Heribert von Venningen (1804-1874). They married in November 1833 and had a son, Heribert (27 January 1833 Palermo, Italy – 1885 Munich, Germany), and a daughter, Bertha (4 September 1834 Weinheim, Germany – 22 September 1907).

In 1838, Digby found a new lover in the Greek Count Spyridon Theotokis. Venningen found out and challenged Theotokis to a duel, in which the latter was wounded. Venningen released Digby from their marriage and took care of their children. They remained friends for the rest of their lives.

Though she was not legally divorced from Venningen until 1842, Digby converted to the Greek Orthodox faith and married Theotokis in Marseille, France, in 1841. The couple moved to Greece with their son Leonidas (21 March 1840 Paris, France – 1846 Bagni di Lucca, Italy). In 1846, after their son's fatal fall off a balcony, Theotokis and Digby divorced. King Otto of Greece became her next lover.

Subsequently, came an affair with a hero of the Greek War of Independence, the Thessalian general Christodoulos Hatzipetros. She acted as 'queen' of his army, living in caves, riding horses, and hunting in the mountains. She walked out on him when he was unfaithful.

=== Life in Syria ===
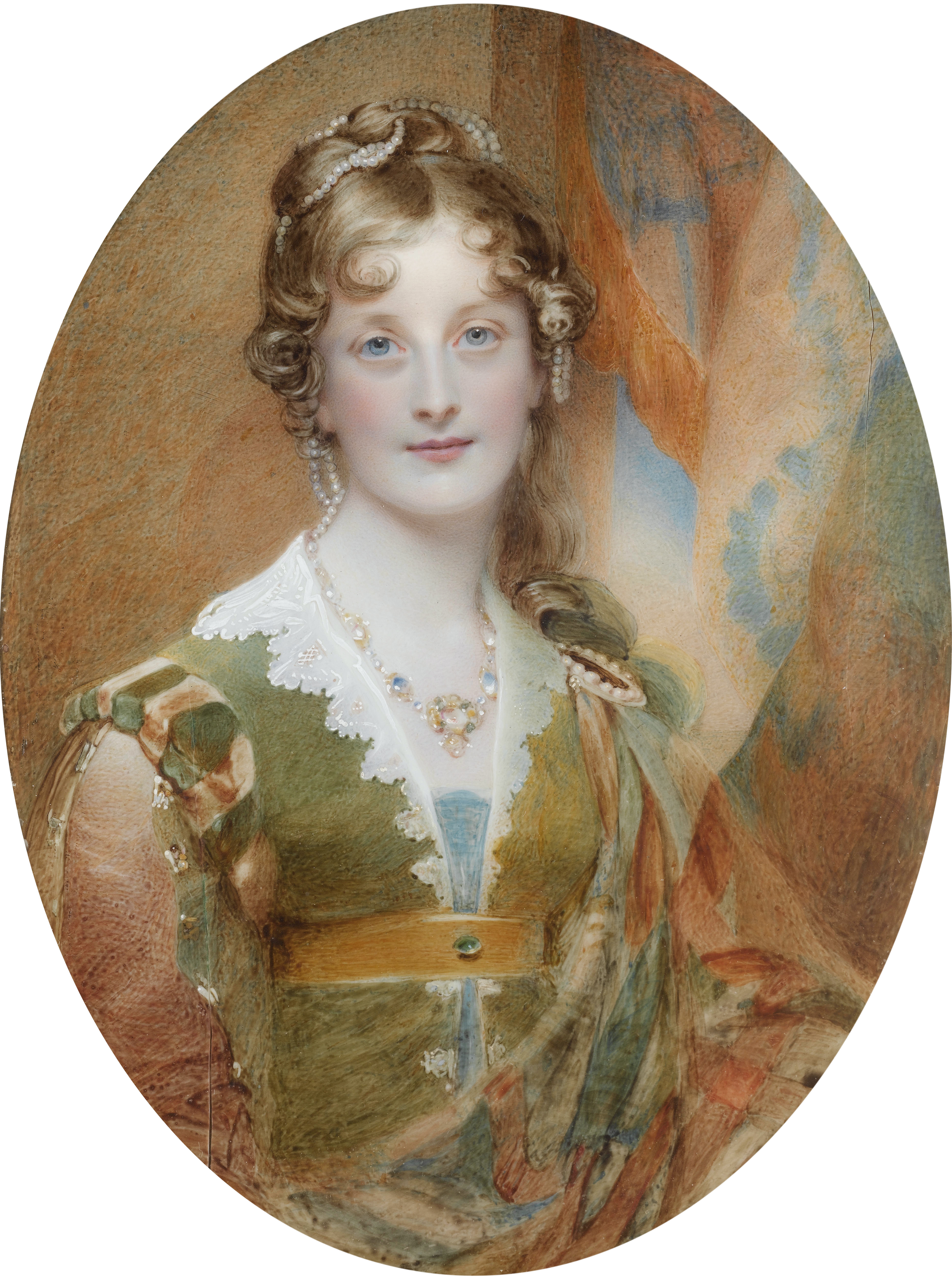
Jane Digby, Lady Ellenborough (William Charles Ross)

At age 46, Digby travelled to the Middle East and fell in love with Sheik Medjuel el Mezrab. The sheik's name has also been spelled as "Mijwal al Mezrab alanzi " and as "Mijwal al-Musrab". Twentieth-century sources sometimes incorrectly report it as "Abdul Medjuel el Mezrab alanzi". The transliterated spelling was "Sheikh Mejwal al-Musrab al-'Anazi", al-'Anazi is a spelling veriation of Al-Anzi, as he was from the Anza tribe. Medjuel was a sheik of the Mezrab section of the Sba'a, a sub-tribe in Syria of the great Anizzah tribe. He was 20 years her junior. The two were married under Muslim law and she took the name Jane Elizabeth Digby el Mezrab. Their marriage was a happy one and lasted until her death 28 years later. It has been written that Jane Digby was referred to as Shaikhah Umm al-Laban (literally sheikha mother of milk) due to the colour of her skin.

Digby adopted Arab dress and learned Arabic in addition to the other eight languages in which she was fluent. Half of each year was spent in the nomadic style, living in goat-hair tents in the desert, while the rest was enjoyed in a palatial villa that she had built in Damascus. She spent the rest of her life in the city, where she befriended Sir Richard Burton and Lady Burton – Isabel Burton – while the former was serving as the British consul, and Abd al-Kader al-Jazairi, the exiled leader of the Algerian revolution.

=== Death ===
Digby died of fever and dysentery in Damascus on 11 August 1881, and was buried in the Protestant Cemetery. She was buried with her horse in attendance at the funeral. Upon her footstone—a block of pink limestone from Palmyra—is her name, written in Arabic by Medjuel in charcoal and carved into the stone by a local mason. After her death her house was let and the family of the young H. R. P. Dickson were among its tenants. A small part of the house survives, and is in the ownership of the same family who purchased it from Medjuel's son in the 1930s.

== In popular culture ==
- Digby's grave is visited, and her life there discussed, in the novel "Night of a Thousand Stars" by Deanna Raybourn.
- Jane Digby's life of exploration and conquest in Arabia was mentioned in the novel "The House at Riverton" by Kate Morton.
- It has been suggested that Honoré de Balzac's character Lady Arabella Dudley is based on Digby. It is in this context that Digby's life is sketched in Mathias Énard's Prix Goncourt-winning novel Compass.
- Lindsay Duncan portrayed Digby in the 2021 television show Around the World in 80 Days.
