= Prousou Monastery =

Monastery in Karpenisi Municipality, Greece

- Μονή Προυσού
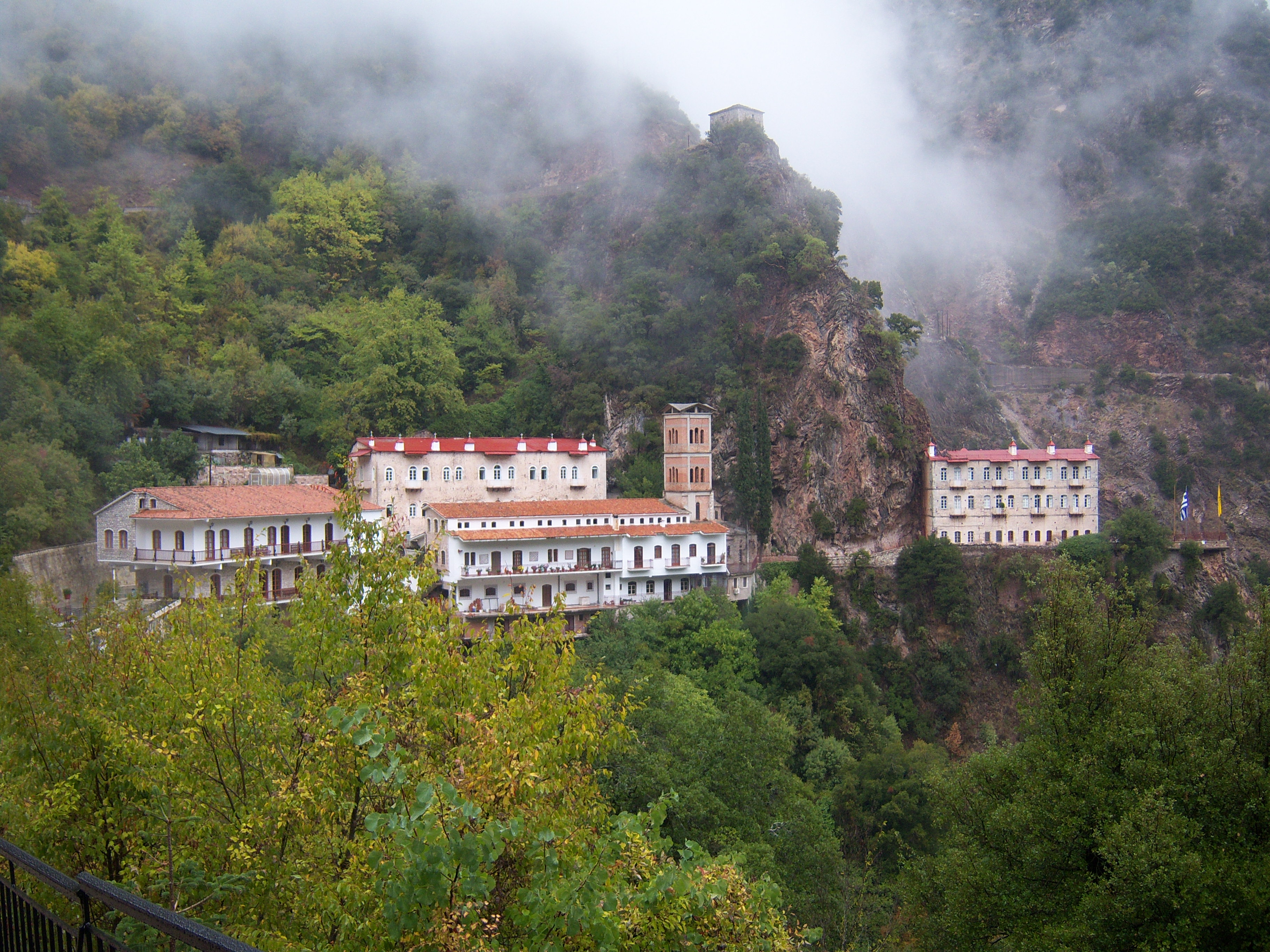
- Interactive map of Prousou Monastery

Monastery information
- Established: 12th century
- Dedication: Apodosis Dormition of Theotokos
- Celebration: August 23
- Diocese: Metropolis of Karpenisi

Site
- Location: Prousos, Karpenisi
- Country: Greece
- Coordinates: 38°44′58″N 21°39′23″E

The Holy Prousou Monastery (Greek: Ιερά Μονή Προυσού) is a Greek Orthodox monastery located in Evrytania, Greece. It is located 31km south of Karpenisi and 53km northeast of Agrinio, 2km from the homonymous village. It is the main spiritual and pilgrimage center of the region. It is built in a steep, rocky area between the mountains of Helidona, Kaliakouda and the mountain range of Panaitoliko, which is overgrown with fir trees.

The Holy Monastery of Prousou is dedicated to the Theotokos and celebrates on August 23 (Apodosis Dormition of Theotokos). In 1748 the monastery became Stauropegion.

== Tradition for the foundation of the monastery ==
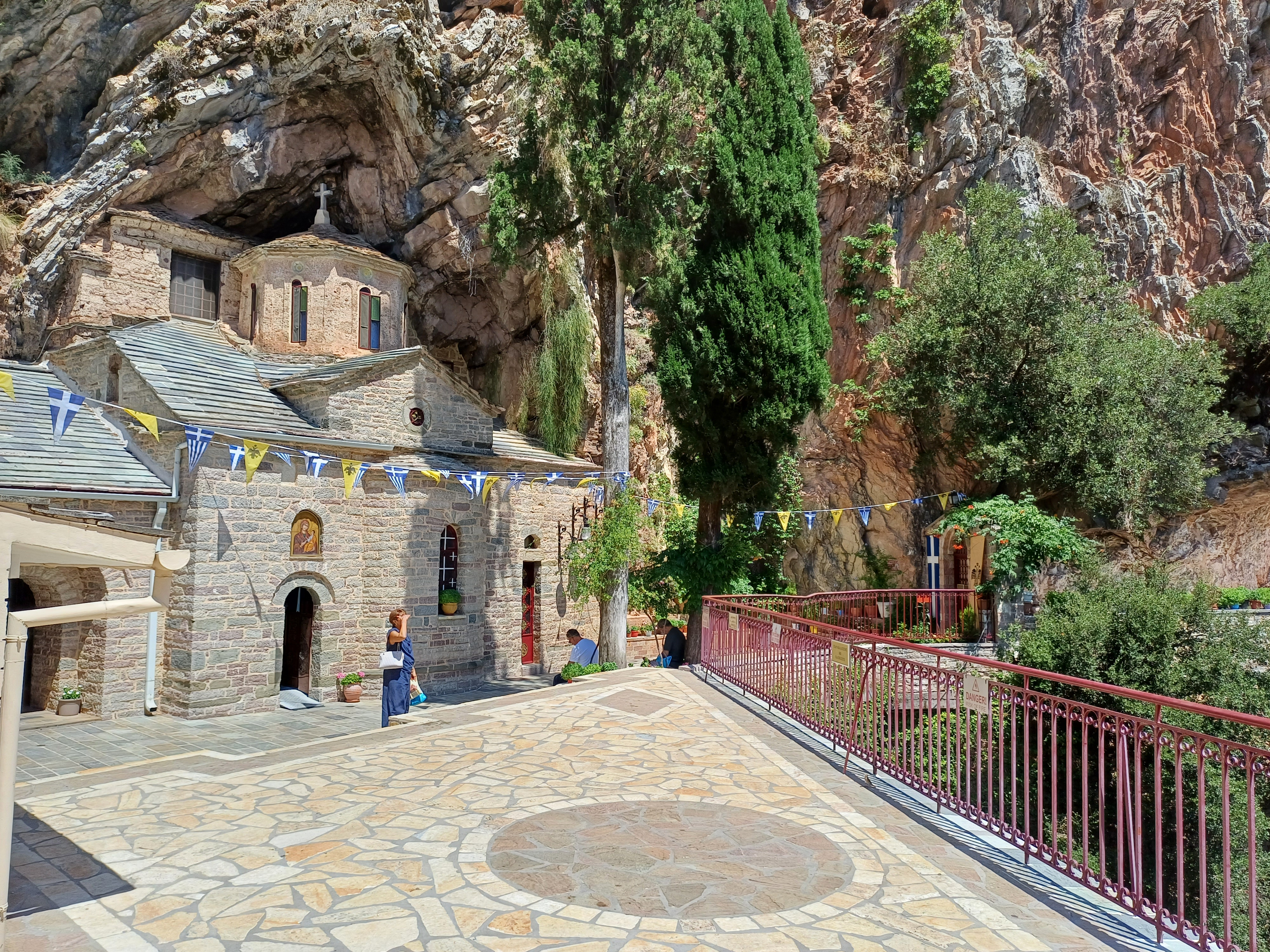
Church of the Theotokos

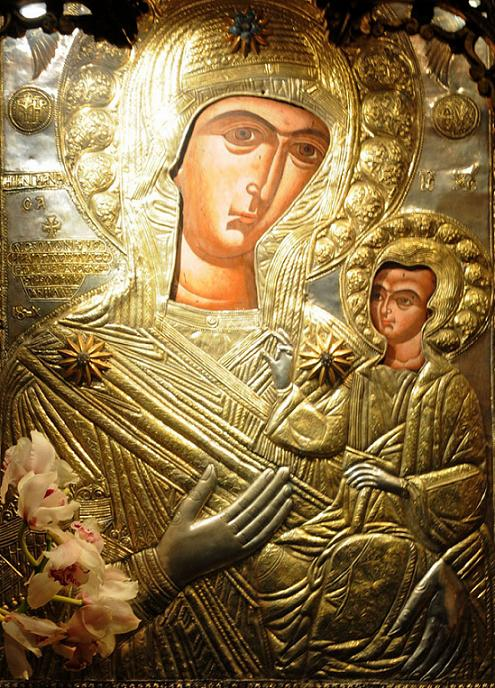
The holy icon of "Panagia Prousiotissa"

The name of the Monastery is due to the miraculous icon of "Panagia Prousiotissa". According to tradition, this icon came from Prousa in Asia Minor and is believed to be the work of Luke the Evangelist. The icon of the Theotokos was located in a church in Prousa, but fearing that it would be destroyed by order of the iconoclast Byzantine Emperor Theophilus, it was transported to Central Greece.

Tradition links the sanctuary of the icon, the current site of the monastery, with miracles that occurred during the transfer of the icon there. The young man who carried it, together with one of his servants, decided to establish a monastery at this spot, as they found it impossible to move the image from there. They themselves became the first monks, and adopted the names of Dionysios and Timotheus.

== Greek War of Independence ==
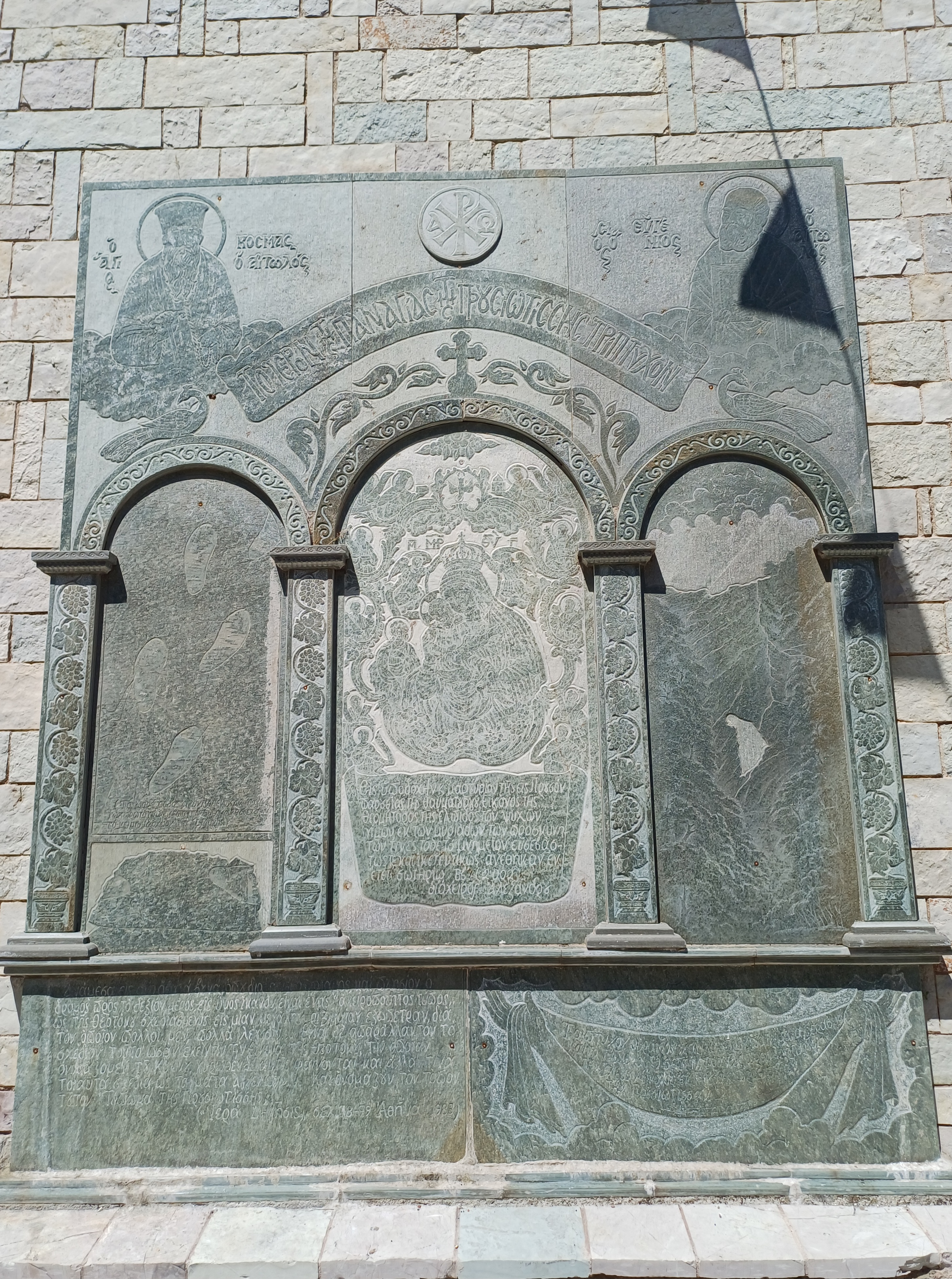
Commemorative plaque in the monastery

A few years before the Greek War of Independence, the spiritual Kyrillos Kastanofyllis was sent to the monastery as abbot. He was a member of the Filiki Eteria and the pretext for his travel was to correct its alleged spiritual and moral decline. Immediately and based on a plan, he organized and operated the "School of Greek Letters" (1818–1828).

The monastery became a center of political guidance of the liberation struggle. It played a crucial role in the entire management of the siege of Missolonghi and also in the rescue of many after the destruction of the survivors. It functioned throughout the war as a hospital and a hospital for the wounded.

Karaiskakis had his headquarters in the monastery. In fact, he donated the silver cover of the icon that today covers "Panagia Prousiotissa", as a sign of gratitude for healing his illness. The modern museum of the Monastery displays the weapons of Karaiskakis.

A large part of the Monastery was burned by the Germans on August 16, 1944, because it was a support center for the Greek resistance. Many relics, utensils, manuscripts and books were destroyed, but the icon was saved as it had been placed in a crypt.

After the Greek Civil War, the reconstruction of the monastery began by the abbot Germanos, which continued into the 1970s by the then abbot of the monastery and later abbot of Docheiariou of Mount Athos, Gregorios.

== Gallery ==
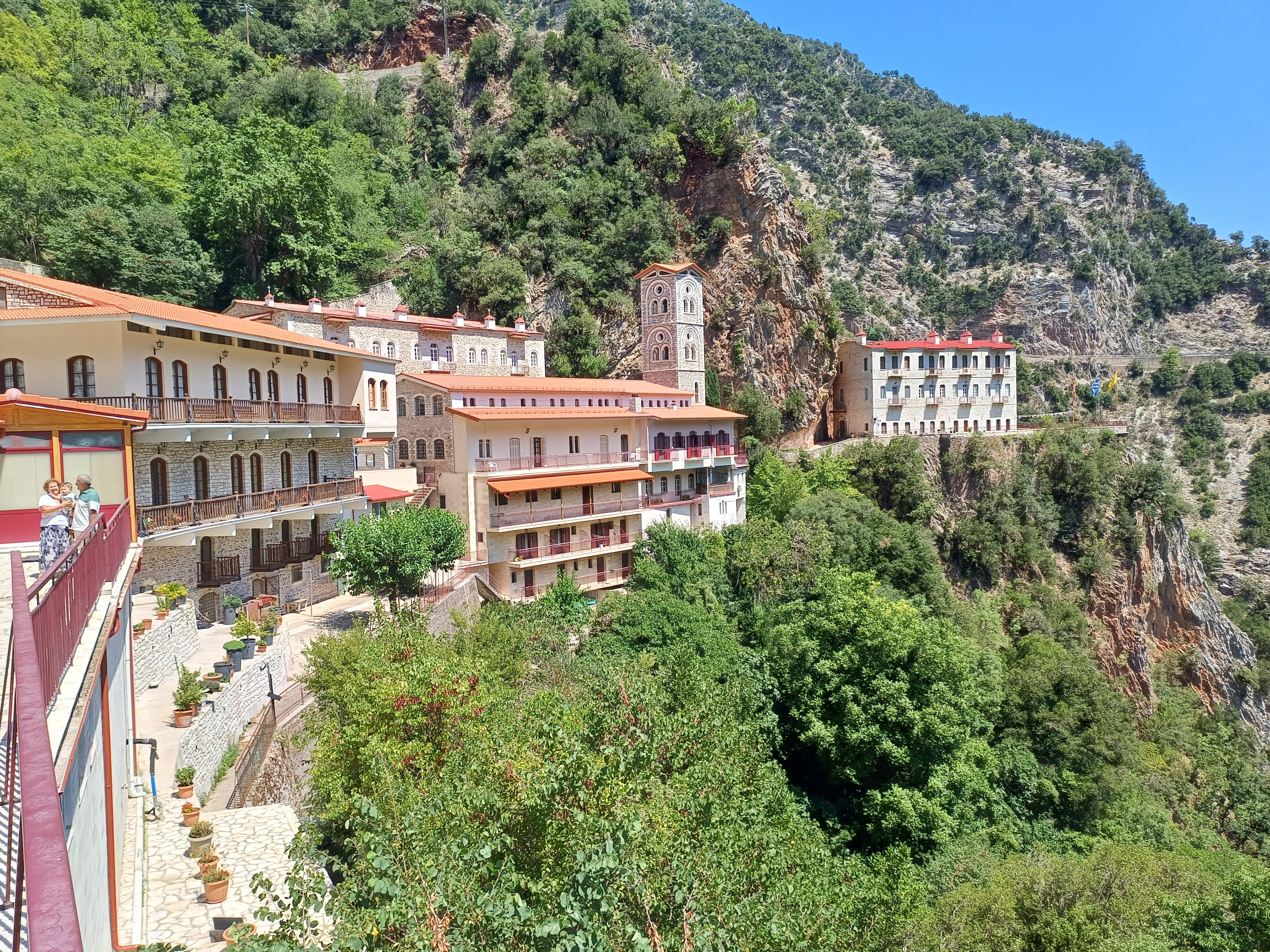
View of the monastery

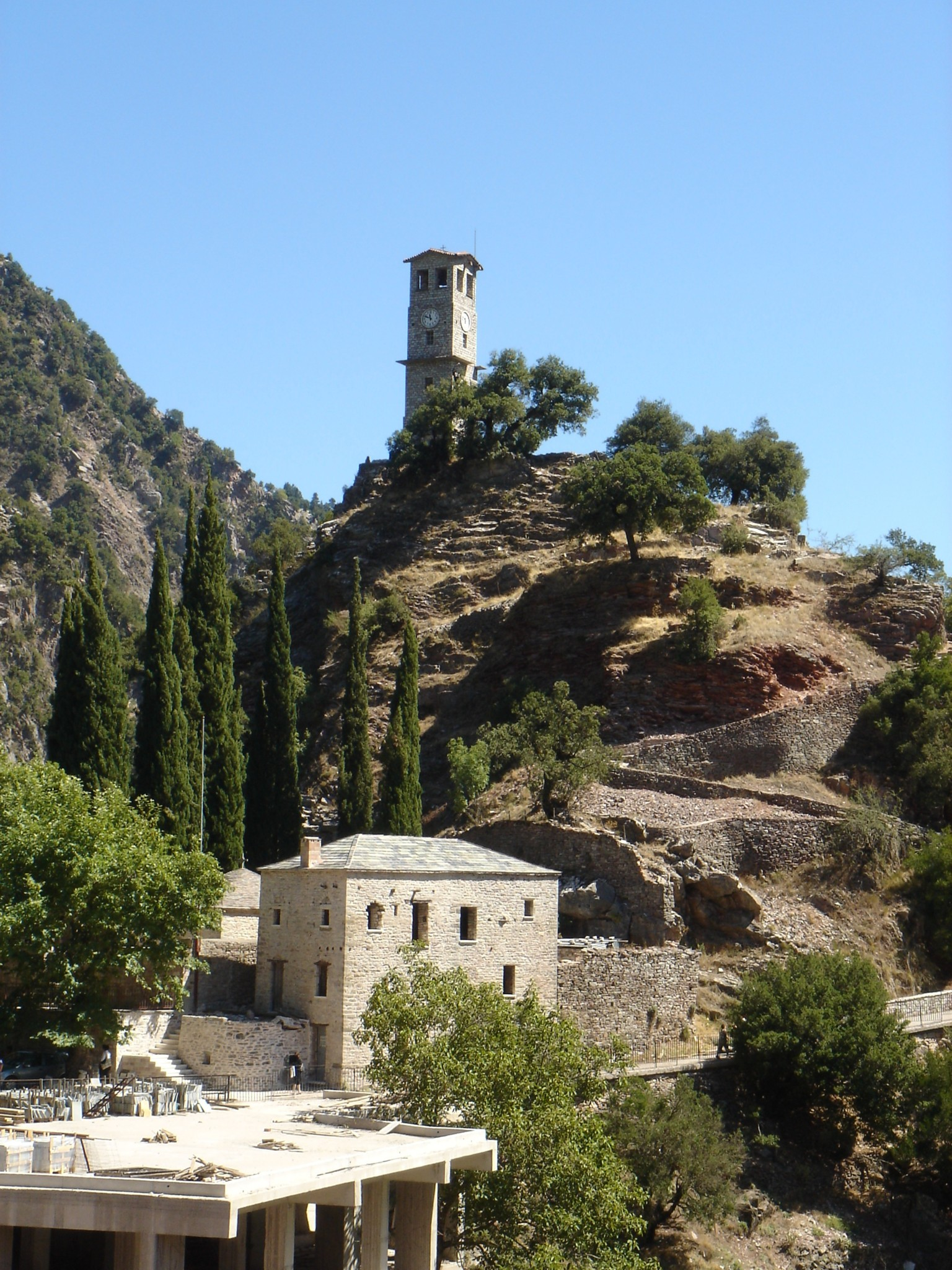
Monastery clocktower

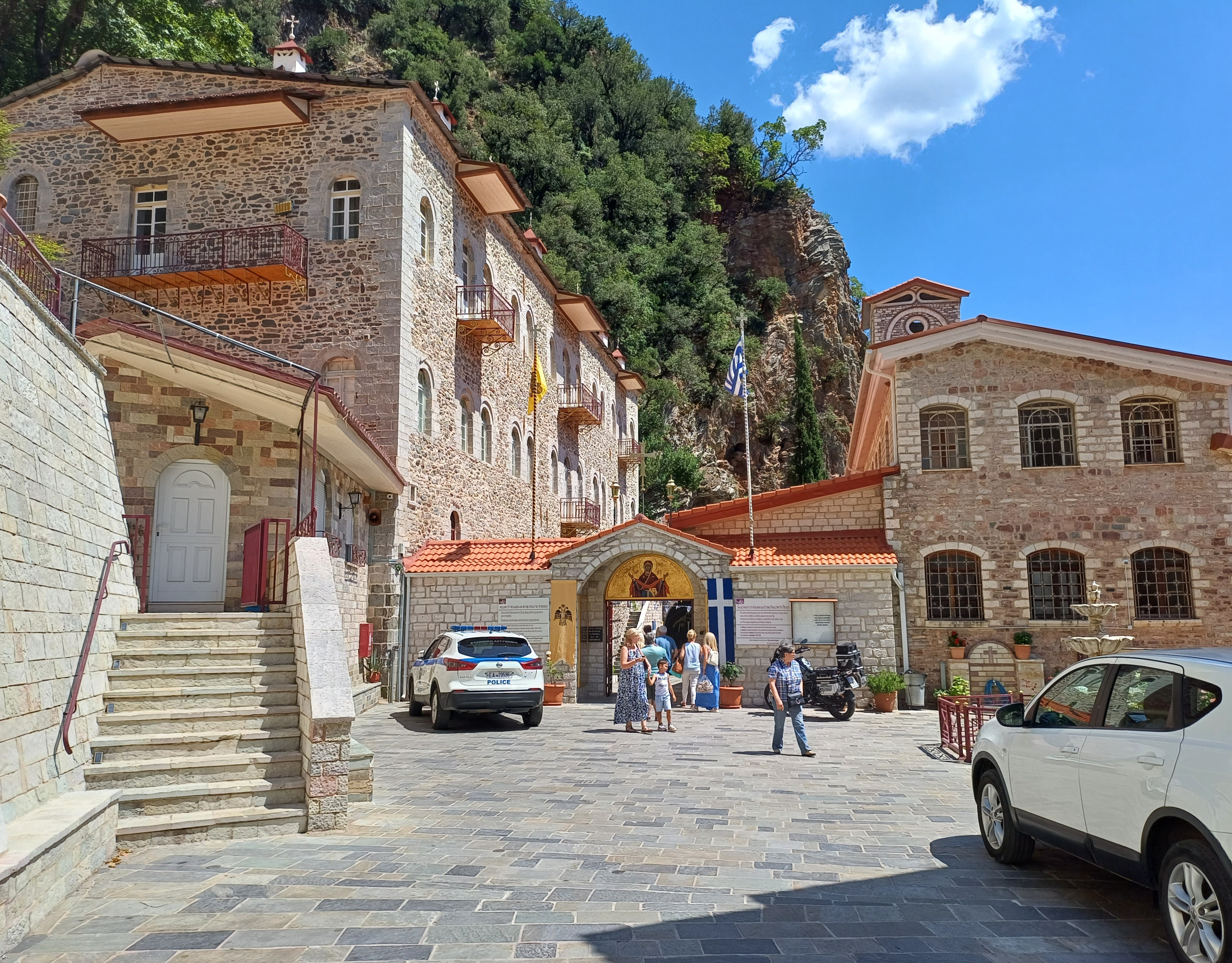
Monastery entrance

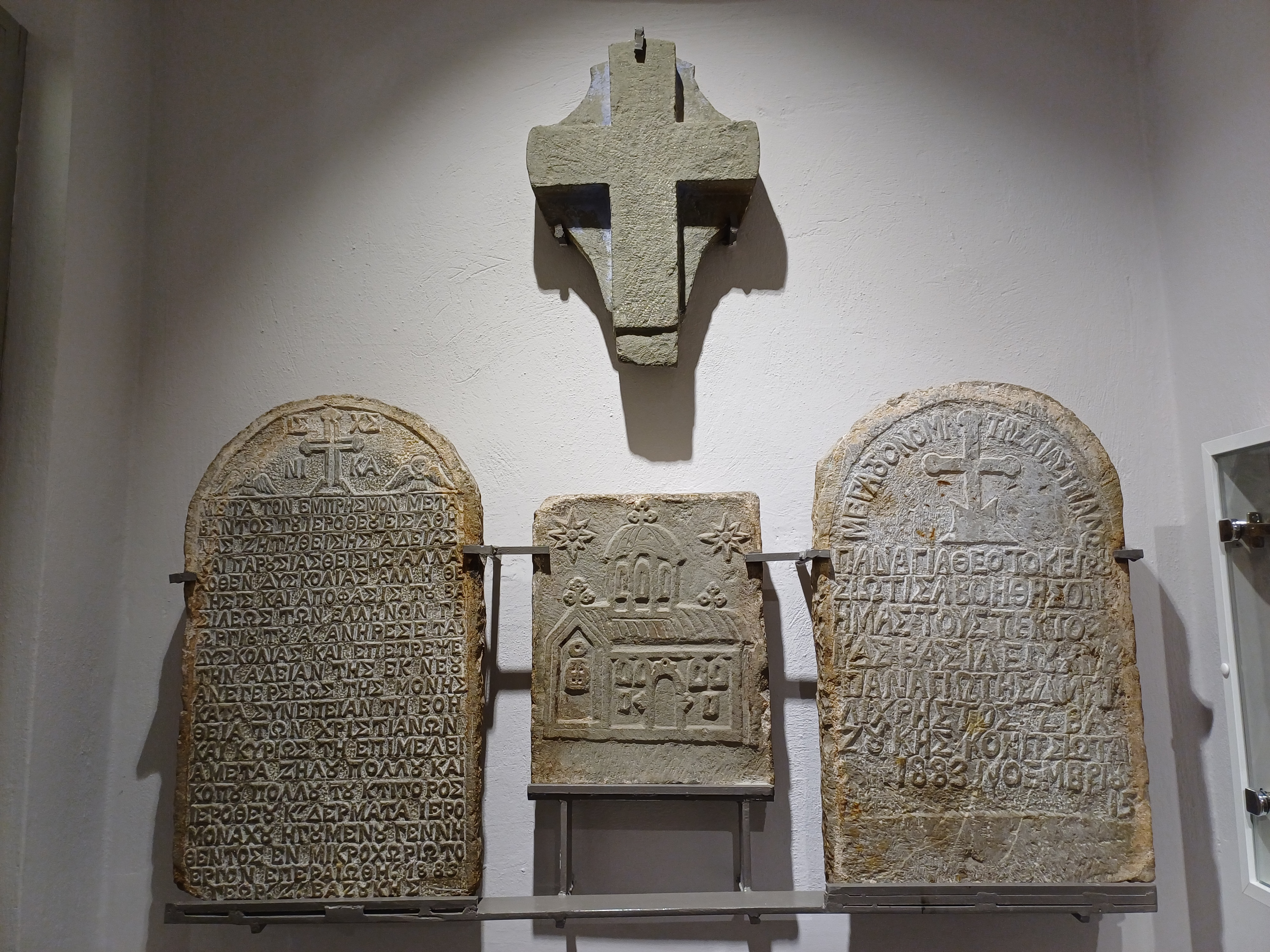
Stone reliefs from the monastery museum

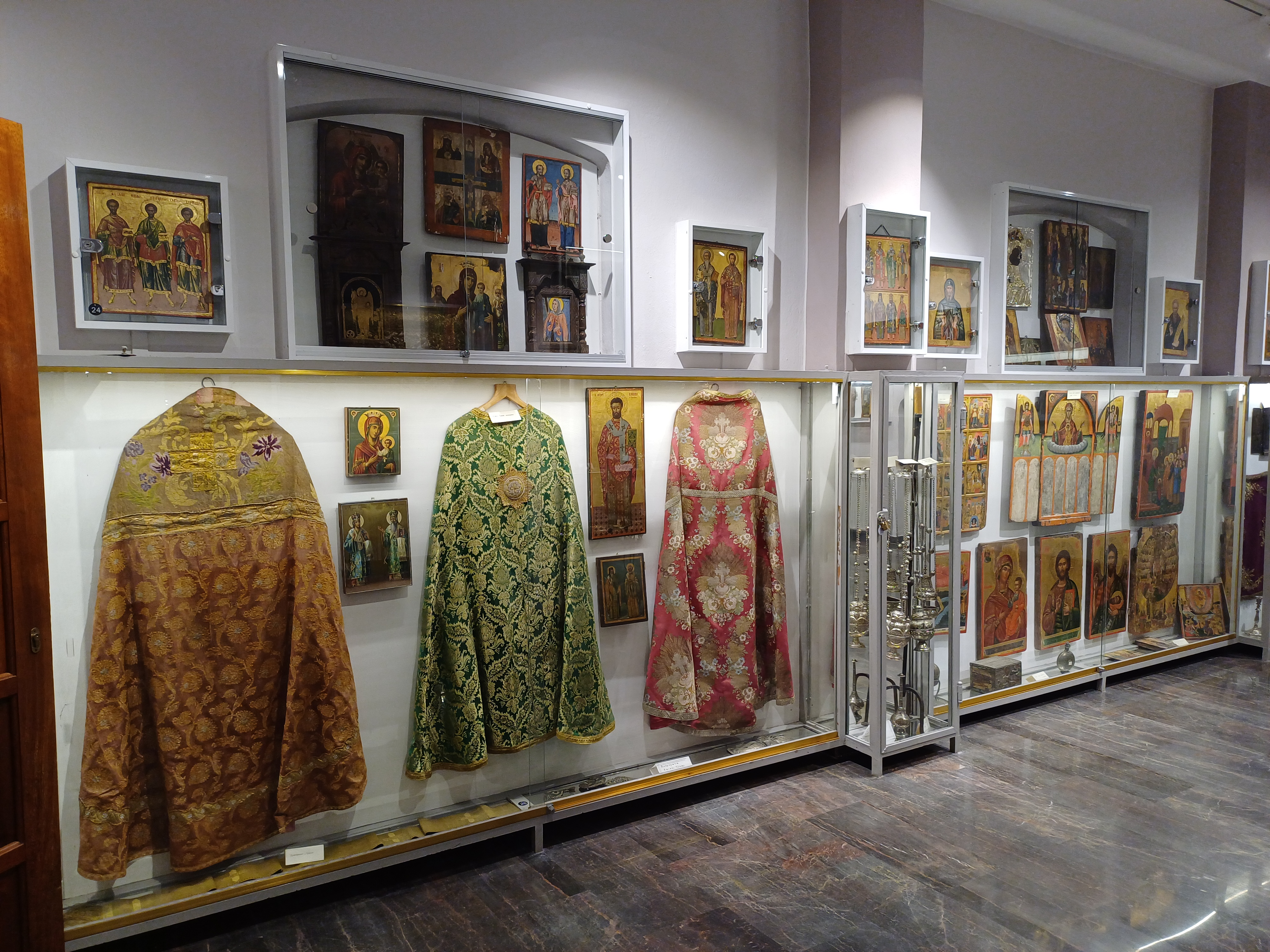
Exhibits from the monastery museum

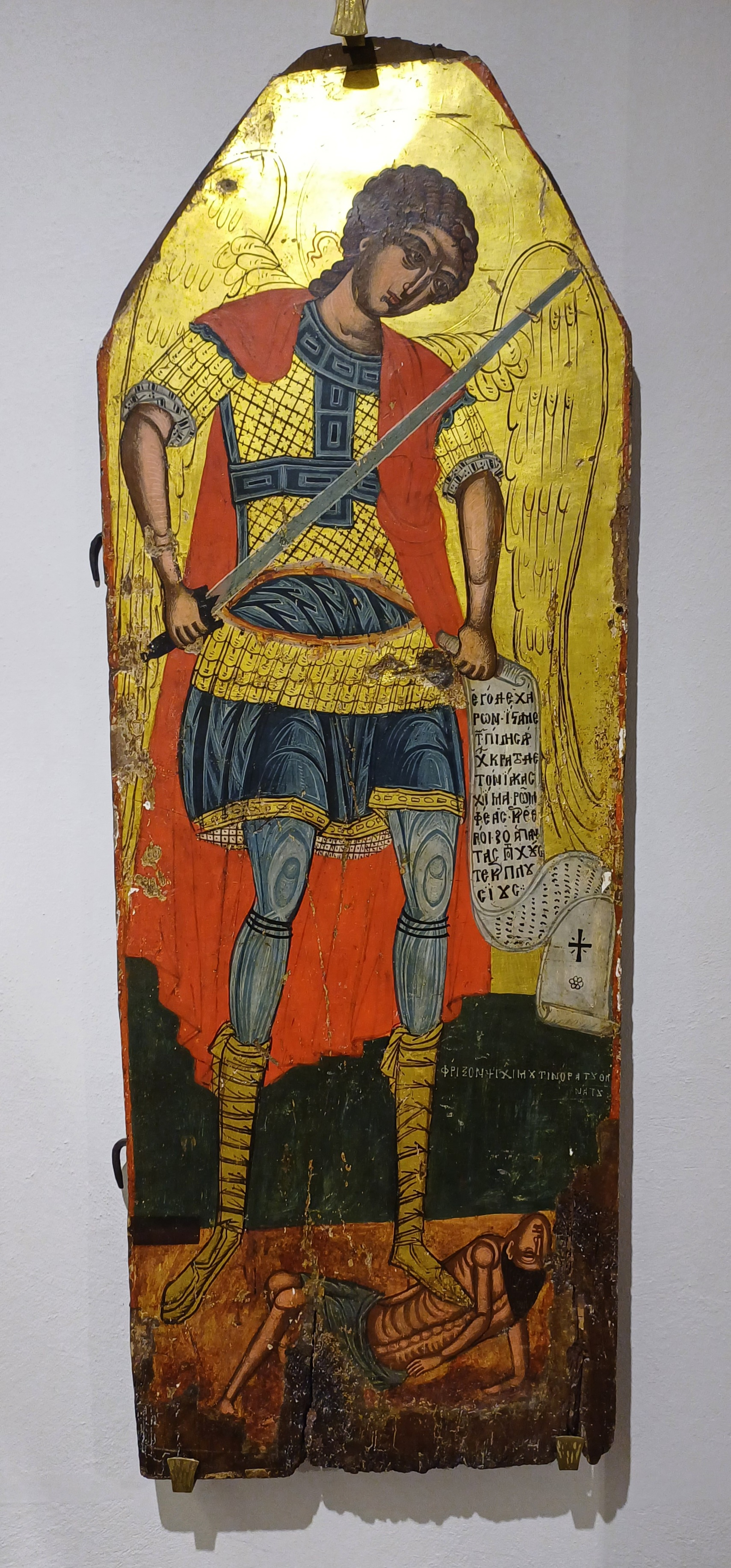
Icon from the monastery museum

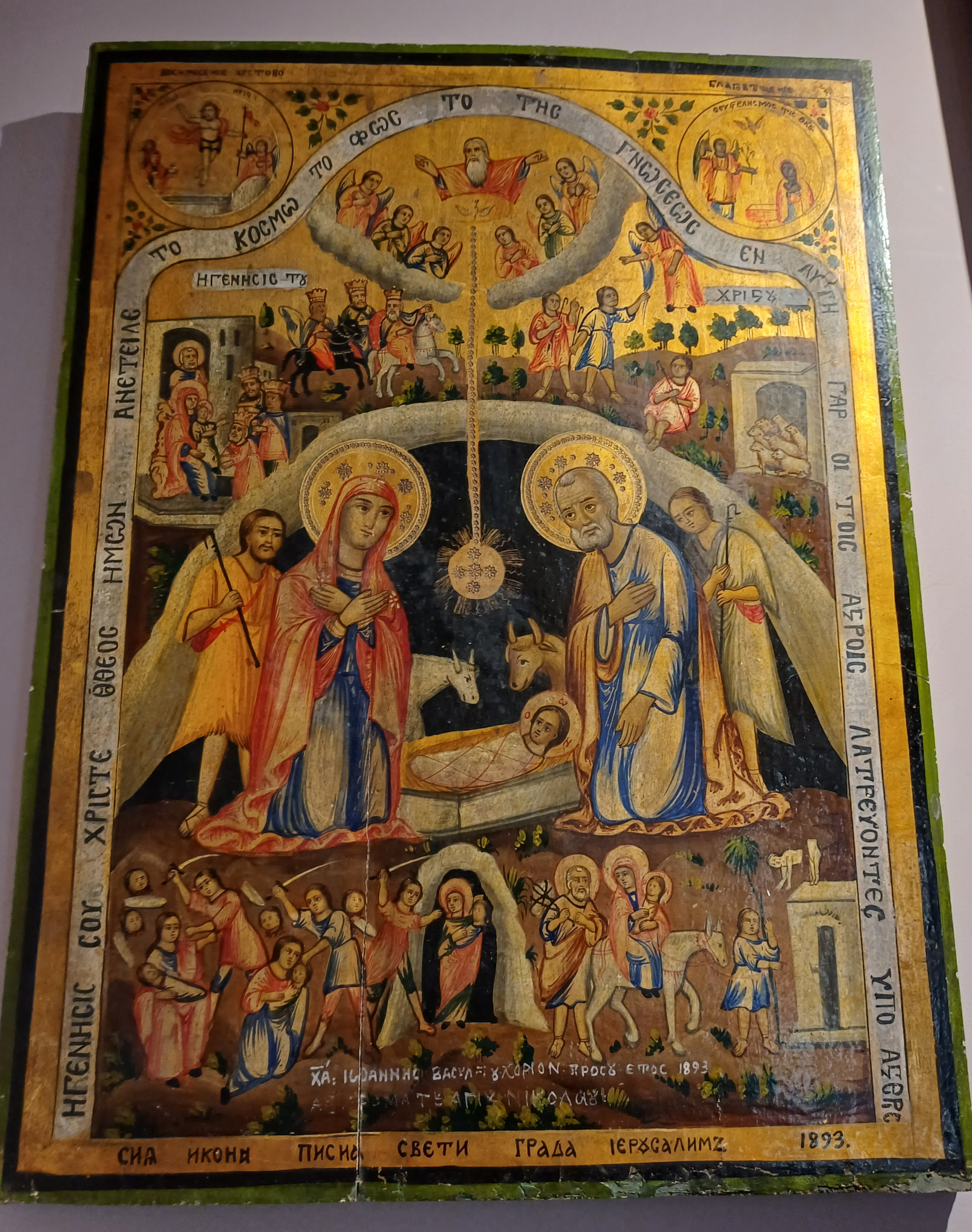
Icon from the monastery museum

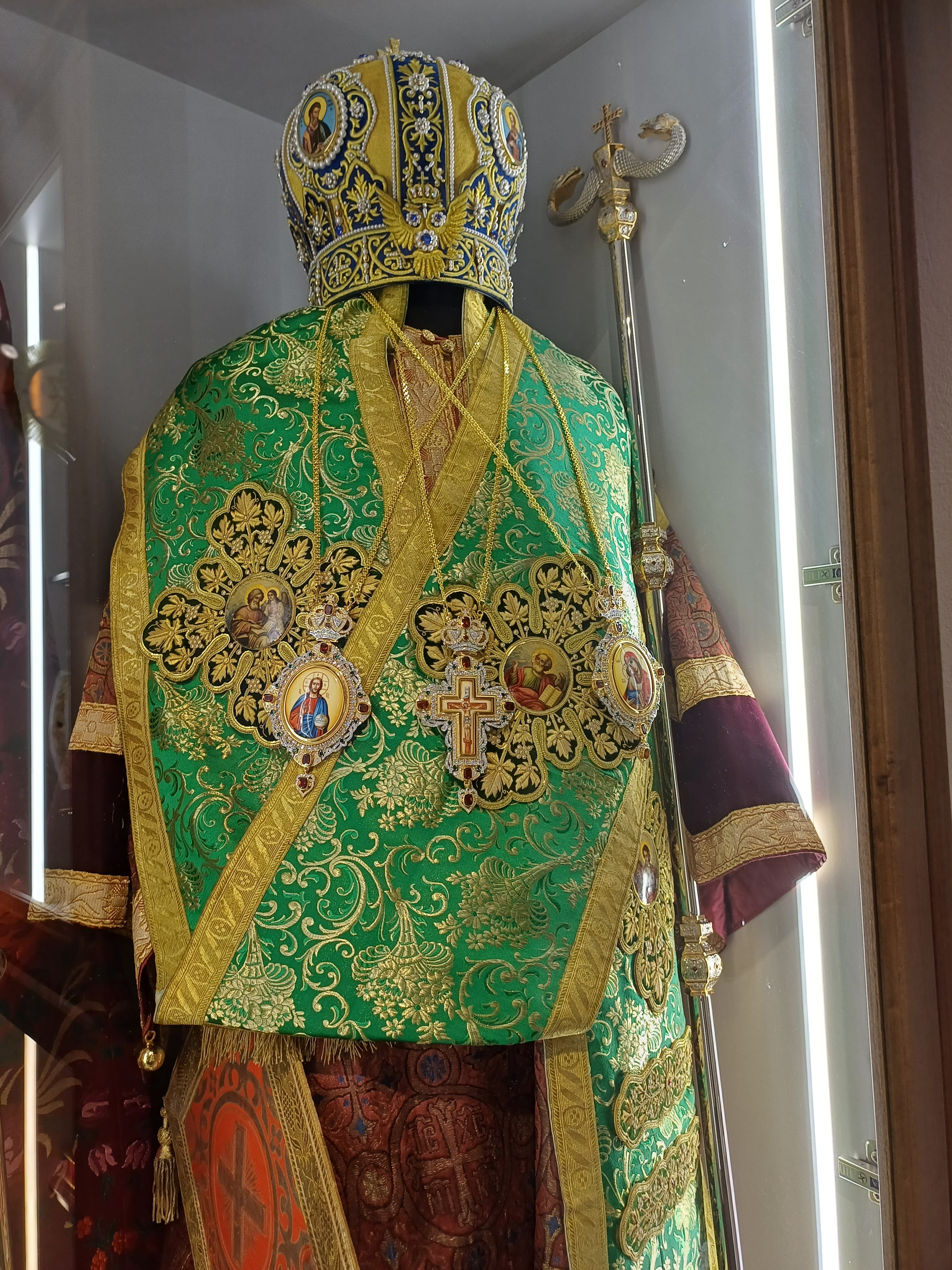
Ecclesiastical robes from the monastery museum

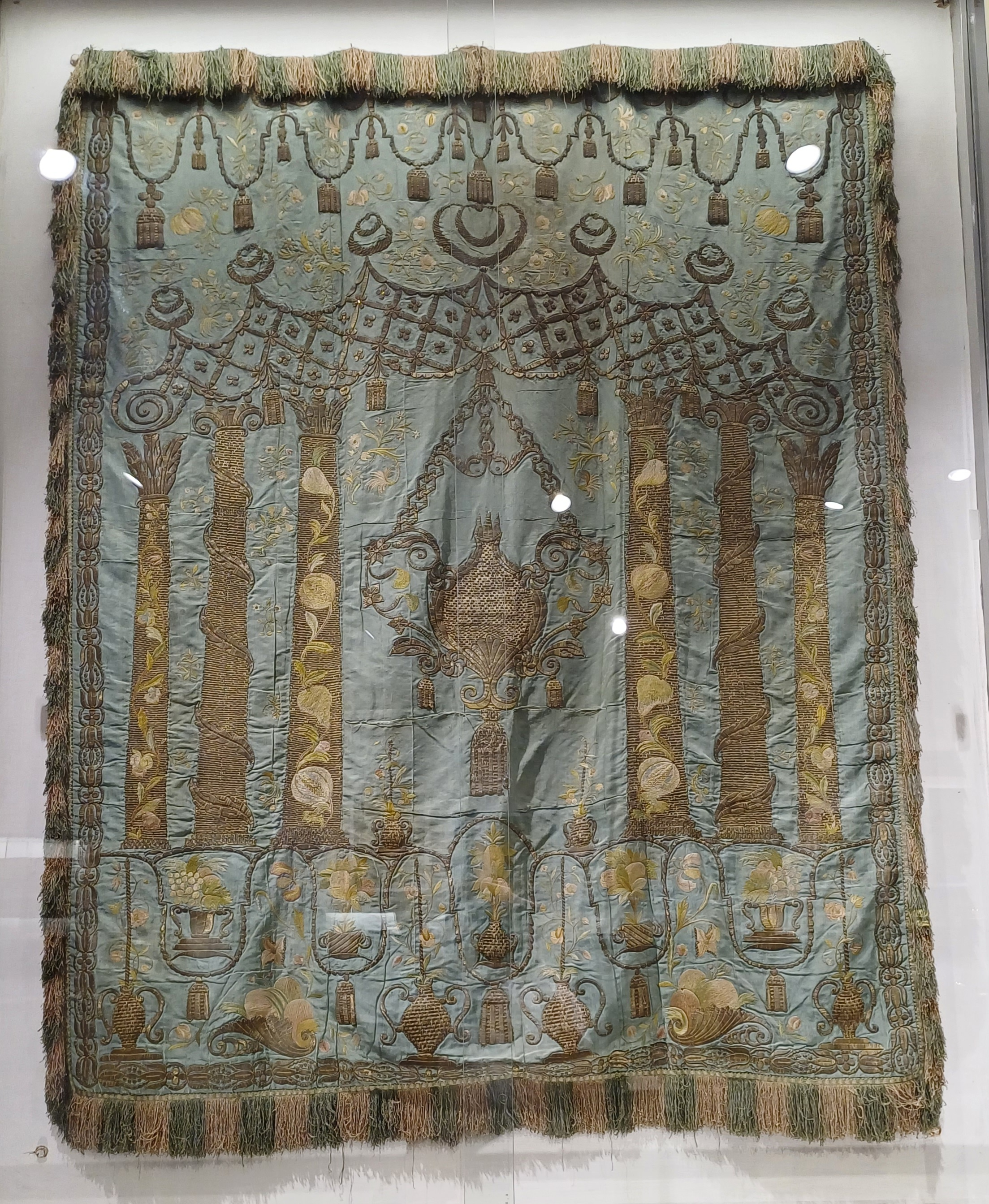
Cloth from the monastery museum
