= Battle of Kompoti =

1822 battle of the Greek War of Independence

- Part of the Greek War of Independence
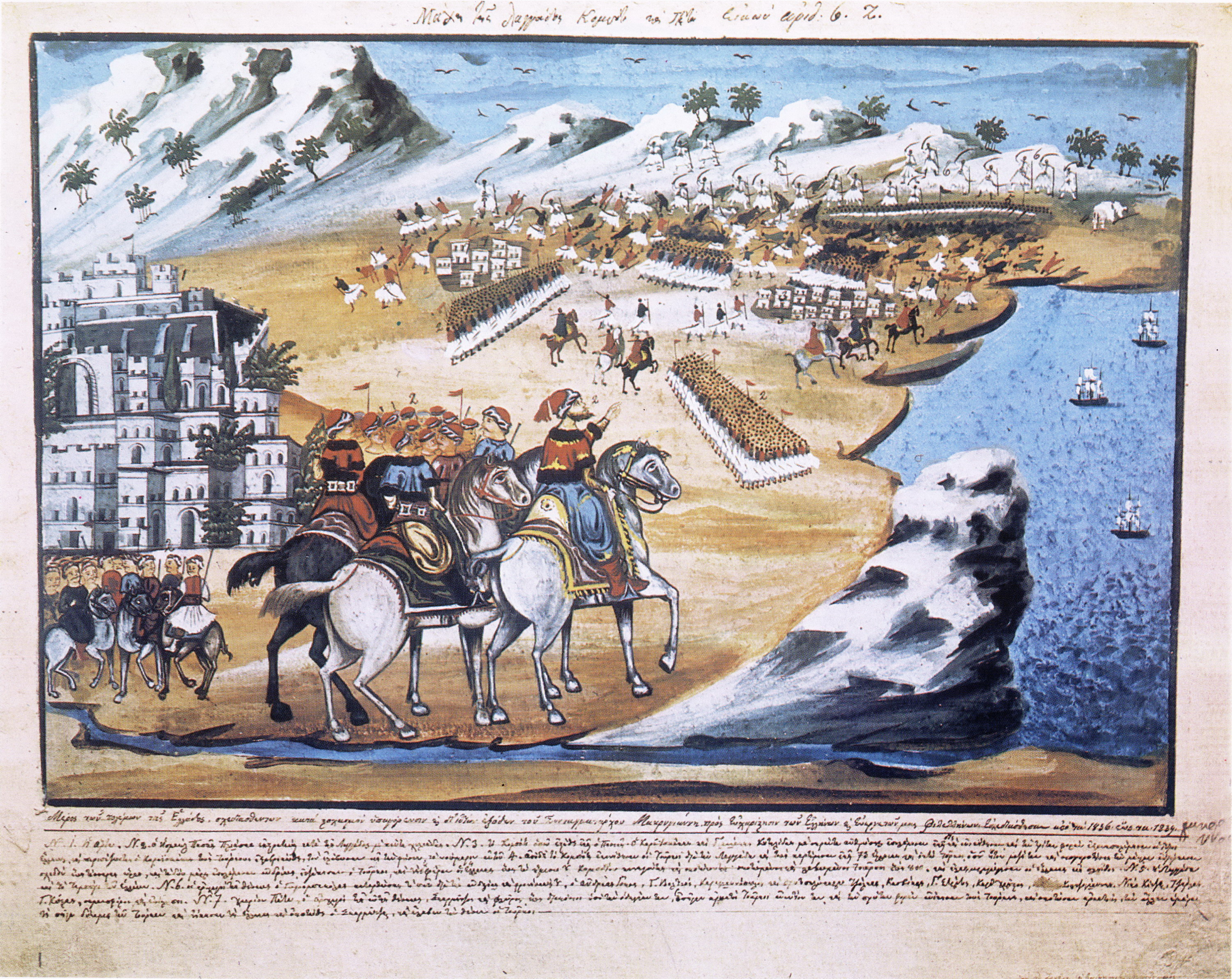
Date	10 June 1822
Location	Kompoti, Arta, Rumelia Eyalet, Ottoman Empire
Result	Greek victory

Belligerents
Greek revolutionaries	Ottoman Empire

Commanders and leaders
Alexandros Mavrokordatos; Markos Botsaris; Gennaios Kolokotronis; Normann	Kütahı; Ismail Pasha Pliasas

Strength
3,000 soldiers	500 cavalry

Casualties and losses
Unknown	Many dead and wounded Metzalis

The Battle of Kompoti was a military engagement of the Greek War of Independence, with a victorious outcome for the Greeks.

== The development of events ==
On June 10, 1822, the Greek army, after passing through Karvasaras, left Makrynoros and camped at Kompoti. It was led by Alexandros Mavrokordatos. The Ottomans, informed of the movements of the Greeks, began to gather forces in Preveza and Arta. These forces were led by Kütahı and Ismail Pasha Pliasas. Pliasas, at the head of 500 cavalry, set out from Arta on June 10 with the aim of reconnoitering the Greek positions and at the same time luring the Greek army towards the plain, where it would be attacked by the Ottoman infantry. However, Markos Botsaris realized his intentions and, on his recommendation, the Greeks fortified themselves in natural ditches in the area.

Thus, when Pliasas cavalry began the attack, they were faced with unexpected resistance, led by the Philhellene German general Norman. The Ottomans were forced to flee towards Arta, pursued by the Greeks, leaving many dead behind them, among whom was Pliasas' kehaya (sub-commander), Metzalis, who was killed by the men of Gennaios Kolokotronis.

== Sources ==
- Γεώργιος Δροσίνης, ed. (1922). Ημερολόγιον της Μεγάλης Ελλάδος, Τόμος 1, Αρ. 1. p. 40.
