= Neraidochori =

Neraidochori Νεραϊδοχώρι
- Community
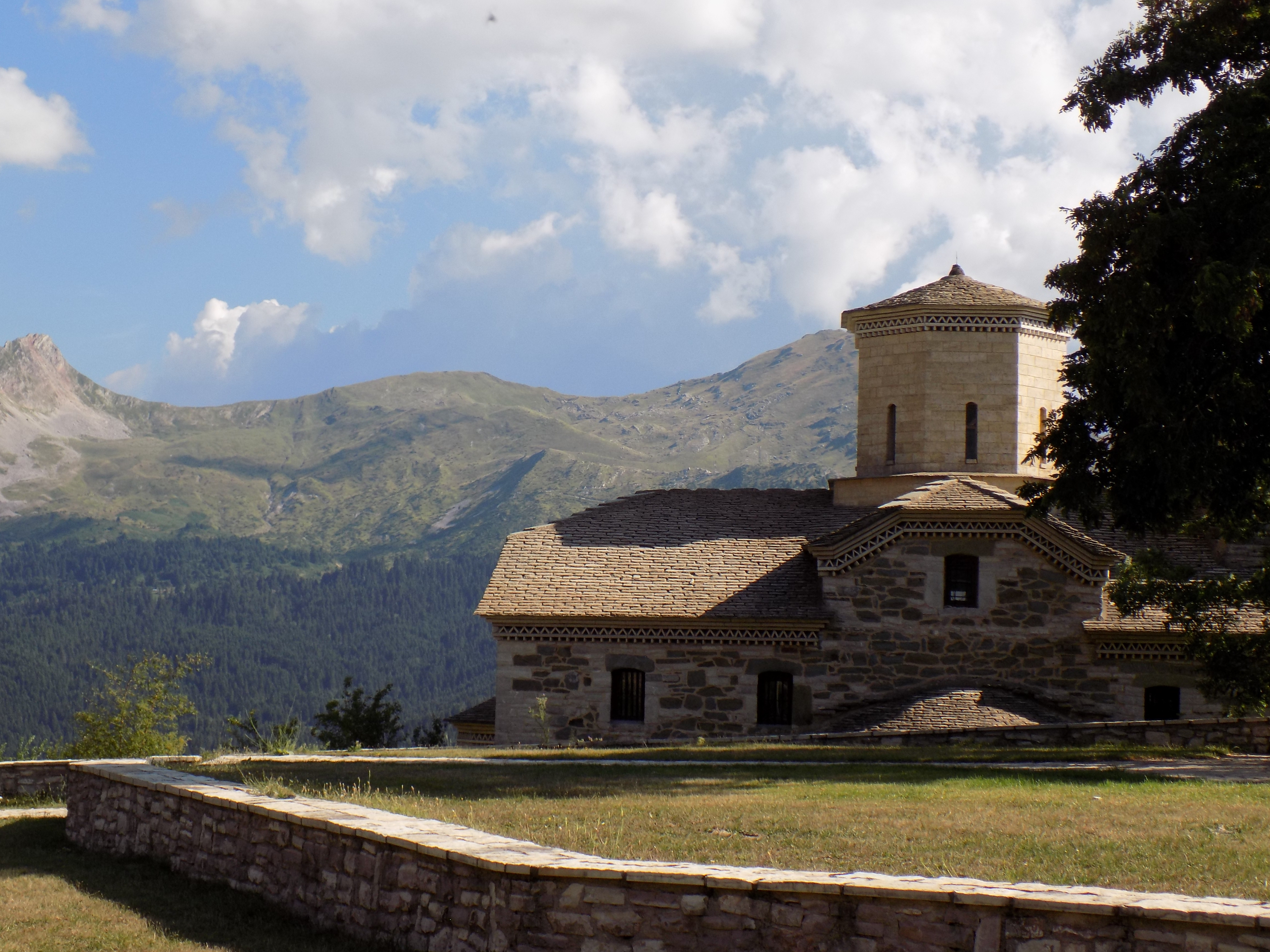
- The monastery of Saint Paraskevi, near the village

- Location within Greece
- Coordinates: 39°32′N 21°26′E
- Country: Greece
- Administrative region: Thessaly
- Regional unit: Trikala
- Municipality: Pyli
- Municipal unit: Aithikes

Population (2021)
  - Community: 191
- Time zone: UTC+2 (EET)
  - Summer (DST): UTC+3 (EEST)

Neraidochori, is a small mountain village in the municipal unit Aithikes, Trikala regional unit, Greece. It is situated at an altitude of 1,100 metres on the central part of the Pindos mountain range.

Neraidochori is only 5 km away from the nearby Ski resort of Pertouli and only 2,5 km from Pertouli. Neraidochori has many Byzantine monuments and also have a stone bridge over the river.
