= Theodoros Grivas =

Greek politician and revolutionary (1797–1862)

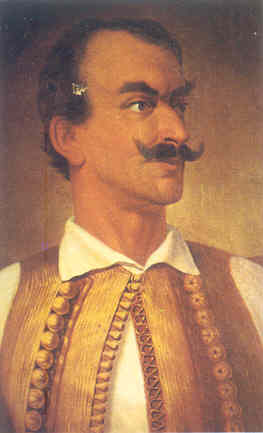
- Portrait, 19th century
- Native name: Θεόδωρος Γρίβας
- Born: c. 1797; Preveza, Epirus, Ottoman Empire (now Greece)
- Died: 24 October 1862 (aged 65) Messolonghi, Greece
- Allegiance: (Greece) First Hellenic Republic
- Branch: Greek Revolutionary Army
- Conflicts: Greek War of Independence; Expulsion of Otto of Greece

Theodoros Grivas, also known as Theodorakis Grivas (1797 – October 24, 1862), was a Greek general and politician who fought in the Greek War of Independence.

== Biography ==
He was born in Preveza and belonged to the historical family of the Grivai, for which there are references as early as 300 years before the revolution (around 1500). His father was Dimitrios or Drakos Grivas and his brothers were Christos, Floros or Kostas, Stavros and Gardikiotis Grivas. His father, a former charioteer of Vonitsis and Xiromero, was poisoned by Ali Pasha, because he did not want to move against the village of Gardiki. He participated in the revolution of 1821 with his own military corps, while during the period of independence he played an important role. In 1836 he suppressed the rebellion of Central Greece against Othon, while in 1847 he himself organized a revolution with the aim of voting against the government of Alexandros Mavrokordatos. The castle of Teke in Etoloakarnania, a former monastery, according to the sources was granted to Grivas after he captured it.

With the outbreak of the Crimean War, he invaded Epirus. But the most important moment of his course was in October 1862 when he rebelled against Othon by occupying Vonitsa. Unruly and unrestrained by nature, Grivas got involved in political disputes and his action, characterized by exaggeration and fanaticism, was also associated with some brutalities, not a few. From there he formed a government with himself as leader and proceeded to Agrinio. Meanwhile he was informed that Otho had been deposed and that all Greece had revolted. He captured Missolonghi, whose garrison he destroyed. Rumors circulating at the time stated that he was marching against Athens at the head of a military corps, in order to seize power. Benizelos Roufos then sent as an envoy Athanasios Kanakaris-Rufos, who offered him 40,000 drachmas (according to Pavlos Karolidis, who also mentions that Grivas accepted the money), after Benizelos Roufos first mortgaged his estates in Ilia and his offered the promotion to the rank of marshal, with the consent of Dimitrios Voulgaris. Then Grivas is said to have shown him his sword and said: "This will make me a marshal." In fact, Grivas was already dying when the government delegation met him on 23 October 1862. However, they read him the decision of his promotion to marshal, giving him the rank. Grivas finally passed away the next day. It was claimed that he was poisoned by British agents, while Yiannis Kordatos mentions the information, mentioning as a source the manuscript given to him in 1933 by General Anastasios Papoulas. According to Kordatos, Grivas allayed the anxiety of the English, because they were informed that he would overthrow the monarchy and be proclaimed President of the Republic. His son was Dimitrios Grivas.
