= Valtos Province =

Former province in southern Greece

Valtos Province Επαρχία Βάλτου
- Province of Greece
- 2006
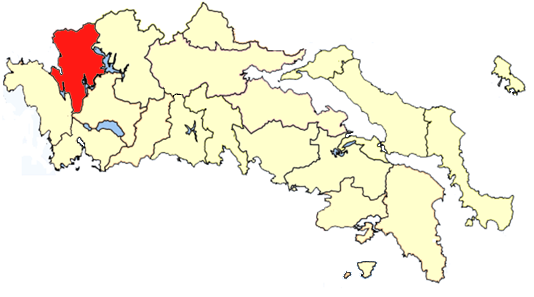
- Capital: Amfilochia

Valtos Province (Greek: Επαρχία Βάλτου) is one of the five former provinces of Aetolia-Acarnania in Greece. It lies in the northern part of Aetolia-Acarnania. Its capital was Amfilochia. The Acheloos River was the border of the province to Evrytania. Its territory corresponded with that of the current municipality Amfilochia and the municipal unit Stratos. It was abolished in 2006. During Ottoman rule, the region of Valtos (which means "swamp" in Greek) was a haven for bandits and brigands. During the struggle for the liberation of Greece Valtos contributed many fighters and leaders to the Greek Revolution.
