= Georgios Karaiskakis =

Greek Revolutionary (1782–1827)

- Γεώργιος Καραϊσκάκης
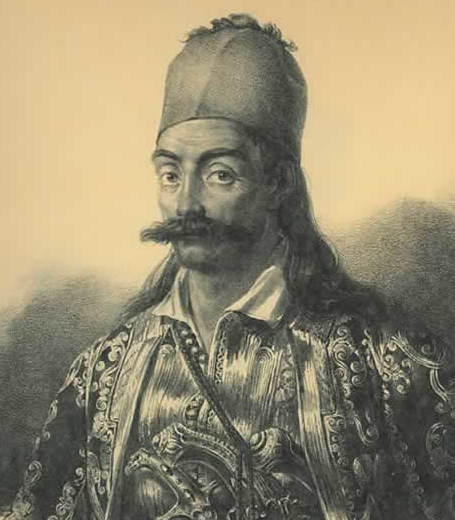
- Georgios Karaiskakis; lithography by Karl Krazeisen.
- Born: Georgios Karaiskos; Γεώργιος Καραΐσκος; 23 January 1782; Mavrommati, Karditsa, Ottoman Empire (now Greece)
- Died: 23 April 1827 (aged 45); Phaleron, Attica, Ottoman Empire (now Greece)
- Burial place: Agios Demetrios church, Salamis
- Spouse: Engolpia Skylodimou
- Children: Pinelopi Karaiskaki (daughter); Eleni Karaiskaki (daughter); Spyridon Karaiskakis (son); Dimitrios Karaiskakis (son)
- Relatives: Sitsa Karaiskaki
- Military career
- Allegiance: (Greece) First Hellenic Republic
- Branch: Hellenic Army
- Service years: 1796–1827
- Nickname: The Nun's Son
- Conflicts: Ali Pasha’s Rebellion; Greek War of Independence; Battle of Kompoti; First Siege of Missolonghi; Second Siege of Missolonghi; Battle of Arachova; Second Siege of the Acropolis; Battle of Phaleron †
- Awards: Grand Cross of the Order of the Redeemer

Georgios Karaiskakis (Greek: Γεώργιος Καραϊσκάκης; 23 January 1782 – 23 April 1827), born Georgios Karaiskos (Greek: Γεώργιος Καραΐσκος), was a Greek military commander and a leader of the Greek War of Independence.

== Early life ==
Karaiskakis was a Sarakatsani. His mother Zoe Dimiski (from Skoulikaria, Arta) was the niece of a local monastery abbot and cousin of Gogos Bakolas, captain of the armatoliki of Radovitsi. The identity of his father is uncertain. His name was likely Demetrios Iskos or Karaiskos, a klepht of Valtos, and was from a famous Sarakatsani family that produced many military and political figures. There is some debate regarding the birthplace of Karaiskakis. Historians have generally put it either at a monastery in Skoulikaria in Epirus or a cave near the village of Mavrommati in Thessaly. A committee set up by the Ministry of the Interior in 1927 to resolve the issue concluded that Mavrommati was his birthplace. Nevertheless, in 1997, as part of the Kapodistrias reform, it was decided to give the name "Georgios Karaiskakis" to the newly established municipality of which Skoulikaria belongs to. In 2005, by presidential decree, a public holiday of local importance was officially established in Skoulikaria in honor of Karaiskakis, further intensifying the controversy regarding his birthplace.

At a very early age he became a klepht in the service of Katsantonis, a famous local Agrafiote brigand captain. He rose quickly through the ranks, eventually becoming a protopalikaro, or lieutenant.

== Capture by Ali Pasha ==
At the age of fifteen he was captured by the troops of the Albanian ruler Ali Pasha and imprisoned at Ioannina, where he learned Albanian. Ali Pasha, impressed by Karaiskakis' courage and intelligence, released him from prison and had him serve as a member of his personal bodyguards.

During his service under Ali Pasha, he fought against another Ottoman warlord, Osman Pazvantoğlu, in 1798.

Karaiskakis served in the army of Ali Pasha in his war against the Ottomans (1820–1822), but after his defeat and death, Karaiskakis fled to Vonitsa.

== Greek War of Independence ==
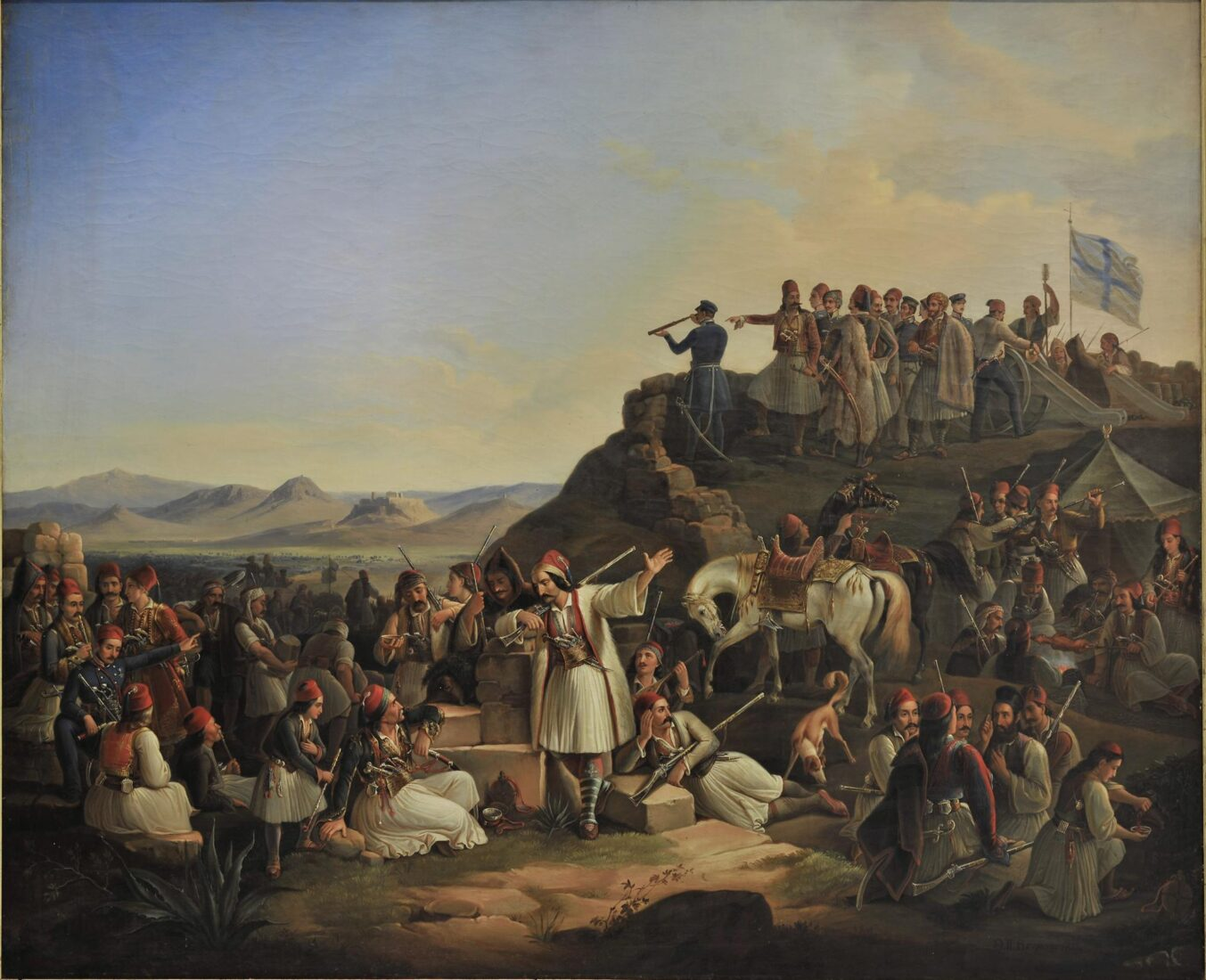
The Camp of Georgios Karaiskakis at Kastella by Theodoros Vryzakis (1855)

In July 1821 he joined the Greek rebels in the Battle of Komboti against Pliasa Ismail Pasha, but he soon left to pursue his long-held ambition of seizing the armatolik of Agrafa, then held by the family of Ioannis Boukouvalas. Karaiskakis gathered supporters from Valtos and other areas, and was joined by Yannakis Rangos. In this way, he was able to take over Agrafa and was recognized as holder of the armatolik not only by the local captains, but also by the Ottoman authorities, who were too busy with suppressing the Greek uprising in the Morea (Peloponnese).

Despite his recognition by the Ottomans, he attacked the Ottoman army retreating from the failed first siege of Missolonghi in early 1823, defeating a 3,000-strong detachment that tried to cross the Agrafa area at the pass of Agios Vlasios. When Mustafa Pasha Bushatli, the Pasha of Scutari, arrived at Larissa in 1823, he ordered Karaiskakis to come before him and reaffirm his loyalty in person, rather than through a representative as was usual. Although heavily ill, Karaiskakis left Agrafa with about 300 men and made for Prousos Monastery. There he stayed to recuperate, while his men joined Markos Botsaris' Souliotes, and eventually fought with them in the Battle of Karpenisi. As his health did not improve, Karaiskakis left for Ithaca, then ruled by the British, to consult with local physicians. In his absence, Yannakis Rangos declared himself as leader of Karaiskakis' men.

Karaiskakis' reputation grew during the middle and latter stages of the war. He helped lift the second siege of Missolonghi in 1823, and did his best to save the town from its third siege in 1826.

That same year (1826), he was appointed commander-in-chief of the Greek revolutionary forces in Rumeli, achieving mixed results: while failing to cooperate effectively with other leaders of the independence movement or with the foreign sympathizers fighting alongside the Greeks, he gained some military successes against the Ottomans.

His most famous victory was at the battle of Arachova, where his forces crushed a force of Turkish and Albanian troops under Mustafa Bey and Kehaya Bey.

In 1827, Karaiskakis participated in the failed attempt to raise the siege of Athens and later also participated in the massacre of the Ottoman garrison stationed in the convent of Saint Spyridon in Piraeus.

He was killed in action on his Greek name day, 23 April 1827, after being fatally wounded by a rifle bullet during the Battle of Phaleron. He was buried in the church of Saint Dimitrios on the island of Salamis, according to his expressed desire to be buried on the island.

== Honours and popular culture ==
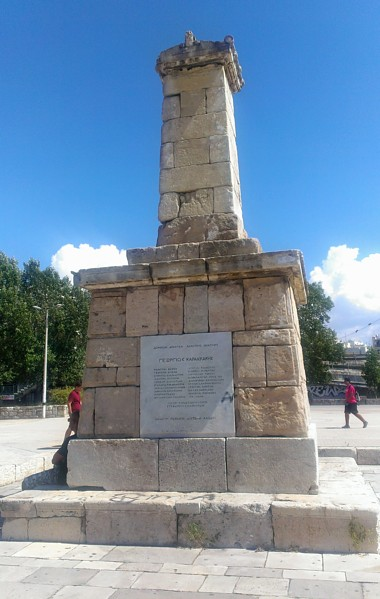
Monument in Neo Faliro, Piraeus

King Otto of Greece posthumously conferred Karaiskakis the Grand Cross of the Order of the Redeemer.

Karaiskakis was famous among the fighters of the revolution for his tirade manner of speaking.

Karaiskaki Stadium in Neo Faliro, Piraeus is named after him as he was mortally wounded in the area.

Dionysis Savvopoulos wrote both the music and lyrics to the popular Greek song "Ode to Georgios Karaiskakis" (Greek: "Ωδή στο Γεώργιο Καραϊσκάκη"). Savvopoulos wrote the song for Che Guevara, but he chose this title to pass the censorship of the Greek military junta.

== Family ==
Karaiskakis was married to Engolpia Skylodimou, and had four children: daughters Pinelopi and Eleni, and sons Spyridon and Dimitrios.

== See also ==
- Dimitrios Makris
