= Ali Pasha of Yanina =

Albanian ruler (1740–1822)

Ali Pasha
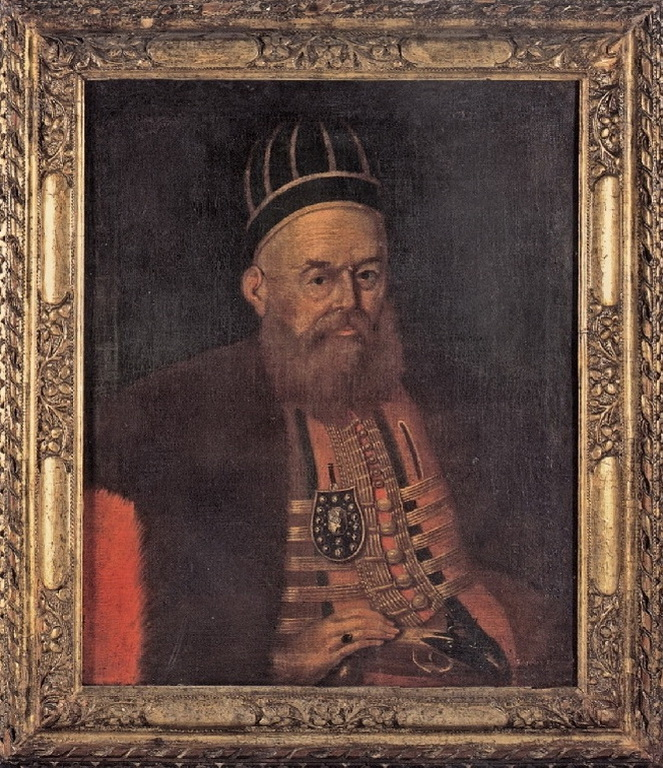
- Portrait of Ali Pasha in 1818 by Spyridon Ventouras

Pasha of Yanina
- In office 1788–1822

Personal details
- Born: 1743 Beçisht or Tepelena, Sanjak of Delvina, Ottoman Empire, today Albania
- Died: January 24, 1822 (aged 78–79) Ioannina, Pashalik of Yanina, Ottoman Empire, today Greece
- Spouse(s): Emine (daughter of Kaplan Pasha of Gjirokastër) Kyra Vassiliki (m. 1808)
- Relations: Fatma Hikmet İşmen (descendant)
- Children: Muhtar; Veli; Selim
- Parent(s): Veli Bey and Hamko
- Nickname(s): "Aslan" (Turkish: Lion) "Lion of Yannina" "Lion of Albania"

Military service
- Battles/wars: First Scutari-Berat War; First Scutari-Ottoman War; Ali Pasha Tepelena's campaigns; Fourth Scutari-Berat War; Souliote War (1789–1793); Second Scutari-Ottoman War; Siege of Vidin (1798); War of the Second Coalition; Siege of Butrint; Battle of Nicopolis; Souliote War (1803); Siege of Kardhiq; Ali Pasha's Invasion of the Pashalik of Berat; Yanina–Ottoman War; Siege of Ioannina

Ali Pasha (1743 – 24 January 1822), commonly known as Ali Pasha of Yanina or Ali Pasha of Tepelena, was an Albanian ruler who served as pasha of the Pashalik of Yanina, a large part of western Rumelia, in the Ottoman Empire. Under his rule, it acquired a high degree of autonomy and even managed to stay de facto independent. The capital of the Pashalik was Ioannina, which, along with Tepelena, was Ali's headquarters.

Conceiving his territory in increasingly independent terms, Ali Pasha's correspondence and foreign Western correspondence frequently refer to the territories under Ali's control as "Albania". This, by Ali's definition, included central and southern Albania, and parts of mainland Greece; in particular, most of the district of Epirus and the western parts of Thessaly and Macedonia. He managed to stretch his control over the sanjaks of Yanina, Delvina, Vlora and Berat, Elbasan, Ohrid and Monastir, Görice, and Tirhala. Ali was granted the Sanjak of Tirhala in 1787, and he delegated its government in 1788 to his second-born Veli Pasha, who also became Pasha of the Morea Eyalet in 1807. Ali's eldest son, Muhtar Pasha, was granted the Sanjak of Karli-Eli and the Sanjak of Eğriboz in 1792, stretching for the first time Ali's control down to Livadia and the Gulf of Corinth, except Attica. Muhtar Pasha also became governor of the Sanjak of Ohrid in 1796–7 and of the Sanjak of Vlora and Berat in 1810.

Ali first appears in historical accounts as the leader of a band of Albanian brigands who became involved in many confrontations with Ottoman state officials in Albania and Epirus. He joined the administrative-military apparatus of the Ottoman Empire, holding various posts until 1788, when he was appointed pasha, ruler of the Sanjak of Ioannina. His diplomatic and administrative skills, his interest in modern ideas and concepts, his popular Muslim piety, his respect towards other religions, his suppression of banditry, his vengefulness and harshness in imposing law and order, and his looting practices towards persons and communities in order to increase his profits caused both the admiration and the criticism by his contemporaries, as well as an ongoing controversy among historians regarding his personality. As his influence grew, his involvement in Ottoman politics increased culminating in his active opposition to the ongoing Ottoman military reforms. He was one of the most prominent leaders in the Ottoman Empire. After being declared a rebel in 1820, he was captured and killed in 1822 at the age of 78 or 79, after a successful military campaign of the Porte against his Albanian rebel forces. The initial Greek uprising in the Morea on the eve of the Greek Revolution in 1821 began as an extension of Ali Pasha's revolt in Albania.

== Name ==
Ali Pasha was variously referred to as "of Tepelena", "of Yannina/Janina/Ioannina", "of Albania", the "Lion of Yannina" or the "Lion of Albania". His native name was Albanian: Ali Tepelena, and he was referred to as Ali Pashë Tepelena or Ali Pasha i Janinës; and in other local languages as Aromanian: Ali Pãshelu; Greek: Αλή Πασάς Τεπελενλής Ali Pasas Tepelenlis or Αλή Πασάς των Ιωαννίνων Ali Pasas ton Ioanninon (Ali Pasha of Ioannina); and Turkish: Tepedelenli Ali Paşa (تپه‌دلنلي علي پاشا).

== Ancestry and early life ==
Ali Pasha was born into the Albanian Meçohysaj clan; they were Christian Albanians who converted to Islam in the Ottoman period. The family was attributed a legendary ancestry as descendants of a Mevlevi dervish named Nazif who migrated from Konya to Tepelenë through Kütahya, and Ali himself would make similar claims to foreigners and Ottoman Turks in order to claim legitimacy to landholdings. Nonetheless, this tradition is unfounded, as Ali's family was of local Albanian origin.

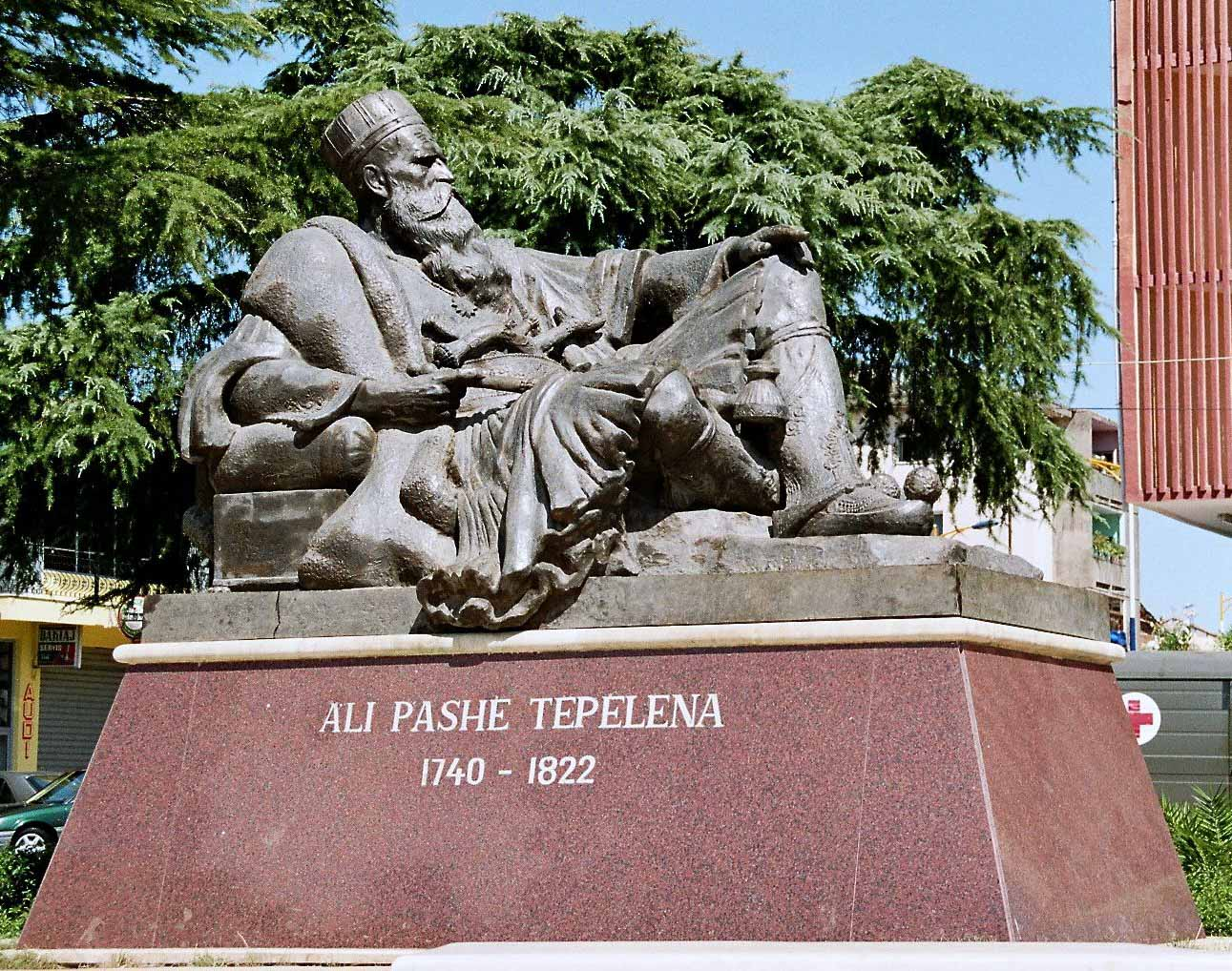
The statue of Ali Pasha in Tepelenë

They had achieved some stature by the 17th century; Ali's great-grandfather, Mustafa Yussuf from the Gjirokastër region, was a notable brigand, warrior and clan chieftain who eventually obtained the title of bey and possibly official recognition as the deputy governor of Tepelena. Ali's grandfather, Muhtar Bey, was also a bandit chieftain who fought both for and against the Ottoman Turks. Muhtar had died during the 1716 siege of Corfu. Ali's father, Veli Bey, was a local ruler of Tepelena.

Ali himself was born in Beçisht, although some claim that he was born in the adjacent town of Tepelena. Ali's father, Veli Bey, was involved in a rivalry with his cousin, Islam Bey, who was also a local ruler. Islam Bey was appointed mutasarrıf of Delvinë in 1752, but Veli Bey managed to kill him and thereby succeed his cousin as mutasarrıf in 1762. Veli Bey was assassinated shortly after when Ali was ten, and Ali was brought up by his mother, Chamko (or Hanko/Hamko), who originally hailed from Konitsa. Chamko was forced to take control of Veli's band in order to retain her family's position. She was said to have poisoned Ali's half-brother (along with the boy's mother) in order to secure Ali's inheritance. She had a great impact on Ali's personality, and Ali deeply respected her. Hamko arranged a marriage between Ali and Emine, the daughter of the Kaplan Pasha of Gjirokastër. Eventually, the villages surrounding Tepelena formed a confederacy against Hamko and forced her and her family out of the town; she was later ambushed and defeated by the men of Hormovë and Kardhiq, two Christian and Muslim Albanian villages respectively. Hamko and Ali's sister were captured by the men of Kardhiq, raped and then humiliated by being forced to walk through the streets with a man on her back. From then on, Hamko would instill a desire for revenge in her son who would avenge her by massacring the inhabitants of Kardhiq in his later years.

Ali would have two sons with Emine, the daughter of Kaplan Pasha of Gjirokastër. The first would be Muhtar Pasha, and the second would be Veli Pasha. Ali's youngest son, Selim, would be born to a slave much later in 1802. Both of his sons with Emine would be married to the daughters of Ibrahim Pasha of Berat. When Ali gained power, Ali's sister, Shainitza, was married off to Sulejman of Gjirokastër; Sulejman's family came from Libohovë in Zagoria, where Ali built a fortified seraglio as his sister's dowry. One claim suggests that she was first married to Sulejman's brother, also called Ali, but he died or was murdered by Sulejman with Ali Pasha's permission. Shainitza's third son, Adem, would become the governor of Libohovë, and her daughter from her first marriage was married to Veli Bey of Këlcyrë.

== Rise ==
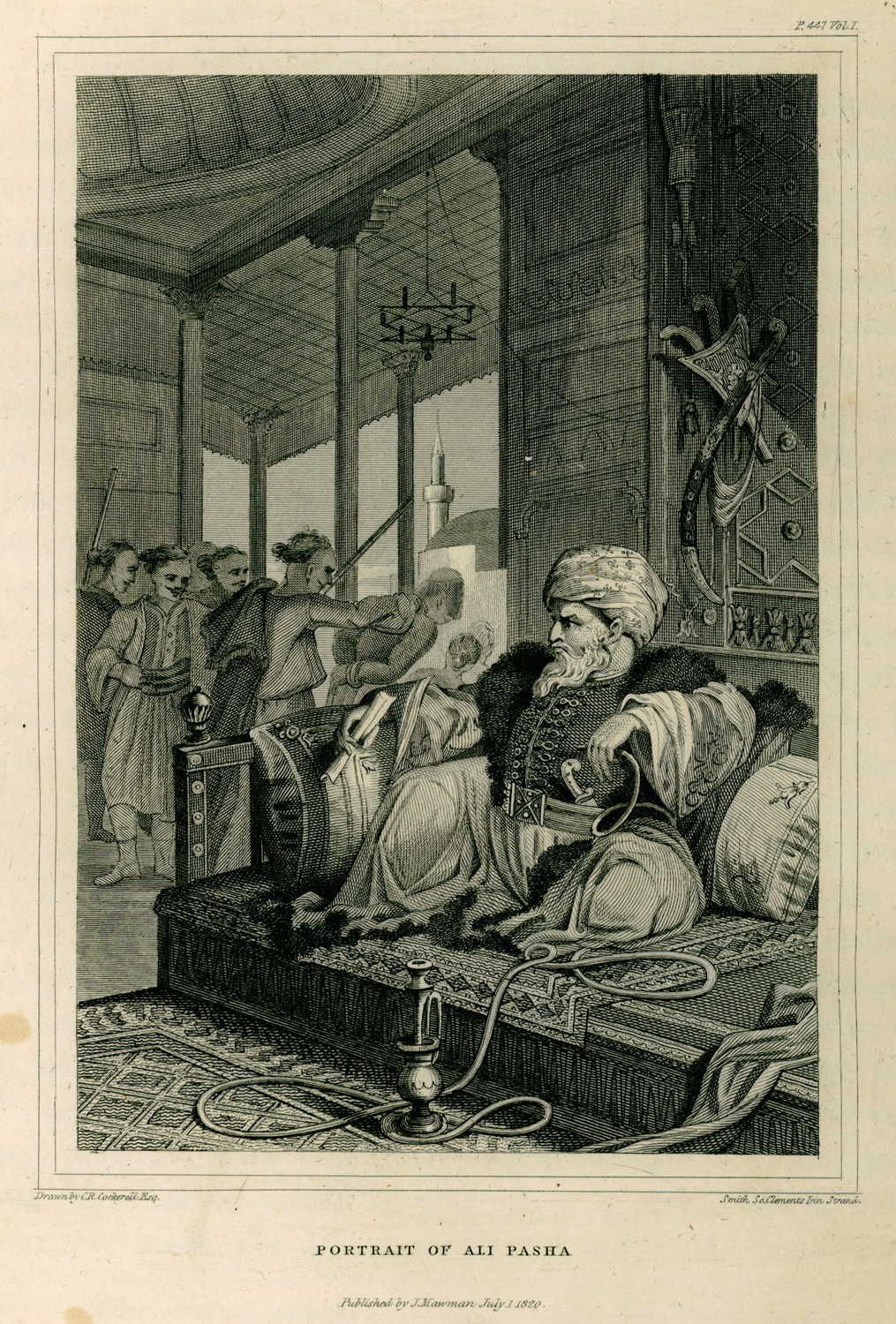
Portrait of Ali Pasha, drawn by Charles Robert Cockerell (published in 1820), based on Thomas Smart Hughes' travels in Albania in 1813.

In his early years, Ali distinguished himself as a bandit in the mountains. Ali's growing reputation as a notorious bandit forced the Ottoman government to take action, and they authorised Ahmet Kurt Pasha of Berat to subdue him. He was eventually captured by Kurt, possibly twice but definitely in 1775 when it is known that Ali was actually employed in Kurt's service, due to a hostility that had arisen between the two upon Kurt's rejection of Ali's offer to marry Kurt's daughter, Miriem. Instead, Miriem would be married to Ibrahim Bey of Vlorë in 1765, and Ibrahim would later become Pasha of both Vlorë and Berat. As a result, Ibrahim and Ali also became rivals, and this rivalry continued until Ibrahim's death. Ali affiliated himself with the Bektashian sect, although he was not particularly anti-Christian or self-consciously Muslim and showed no favouritism to either group as a ruler.

Venetian records indicate that Ali and his cousin, Islam Bey of Këlcyrë, were part of a force of 9,000 Muslim Albanians under Sulejman Çapari, the aga of Margariti, who were engaged in conflict with the Souliotes in 1772, and it is possible that Ali was also part of Ahmet Kurt Pasha's force in 1775 during Kurt's campaign against the Souliotes. The first military action in which Ali is confirmed to have participated in was Ahmet Kurt Pasha's conflict with Mehmed Pasha Bushati in 1776; Ali and his cousin Islam distinguished themselves during the subsequent engagements around Kavajë and Tirana, but Ali fell out with Kurt over the division of the spoils of war and resumed his life of banditry. In 1778, Ahmet Kurt Pasha was disgraced and dismissed as a result of the schemes employed by Mehmed 'Kalo' Pasha of Yanina, who then took over the Sanjak of Avlona. The guardianship of the mountain passes was bestowed upon a Turk from Thessaly known as Catalcali Haci Ali Pasha; the local Albanians did not like him, and so he appointed Ali Pasha – at this point Ali Bey – as his deputy to establish order amongst the Albanian brigands while Catalcali remained in his fortress in the distant Chalkis of Euboea.

With this new Ottoman administrative position, Ali eliminated the military and civil officials appointed by Kurt in favour of his own men, and established a network between the leaders of Albanian bands and the captains of armatoli. Albanian fighters that refused to serve Ali were relocated to the Morea, where they could continue their occupation of plundering. Ali's new position also meant that he could orchestrate legitimate and illegitimate protection rackets that gave him enough resources to recruit mercenaries and set aside money for bribes. Around this time, Ali went to Missolonghi to collect a debt owed by Michaeles Avronites, a local sea captain who was originally from Cephallonia and therefore a Venetian subject. Ali arrived in the town with his Albanians as a show of force, and when he could not find Avronites, Ali seized a number of Venetian subjects, including the Venetian consul. They were released only after Missolonghi's leaders declared that they would pay the debt themselves, and Ali took 500 barrels of merchandise bound for the Ionian Islands as a guarantee, although these barrels were never returned to the people of Missolonghi. Similar intimidation tactics were used across Epirus by Ali, who although serving in this administrative position for only five months, managed to impose order and a systemic tax regime, as well as amass enormous personal wealth.

=== Rivalry with Ahmet Kurt Pasha ===
In 1779, Ahmet Kurt Pasha had returned to power through intrigue and bribery of the Sublime Porte. Ali openly challenged Kurt in an effort to get the Porte to recognise that Ali had a stronger power-base. Ali marched an army of 2,000–3,000 Albanians through Thessaly, dispersing them along the journey to intimidate local towns and villages and to extract wealth from them. At Trikkala, Ali led his own detachment of 300 soldiers into the near-deserted town as many of the inhabitants had already fled upon his approach. Once a certain amount of protection money was extracted from the town, Ali and his men left and proceeded to Farsala, where he and Catalcali Haci (who was still Ali's superior) plotted against Ahmet Kurt Pasha.

Ali's first action was to take the district of Acarnania, where his soldiers had already visited Missolonghi and yet again extracted more tributes from the citizens. Ali arrived with 4,000 men, occupying the regional capital of Vrachori (Agrinion) and re-joining his Albanian troops that had returned from their ravaging of the Morea. In response, Kurt moved his troops southwards in Epirus and placed pressure upon the Venetians and the armatoles to restrict Ali's approach. The Sublime Porte was forced to intervene in the situation, and Ottoman general Cezayirli Gazi Hasan Pasha, who was already dispatched to dispose of the Albanian irregulars in the Morea, was instead sent to Macedonia and Thessaly to re-establish regional order. Gazi Hasan Pasha, although aided by local Turks, armatoles and Greek peasants, was not able to defeat and drive out the Albanians. However, he later succeeded in pacifying the Albanians in the Morea, but peace was only temporarily restored as the Albanians continued to pour into the region.

Meanwhile, Ali had returned to Tepelena to restore his family's position and solidify his power base. Upon learning that the Sublime Porte refused to restore him in place of Ahmet Kurt Pasha, Ali ordered his tribal and feudal allies to attack Kurt's local garrisons, ravaging the mountain districts between Tepelena and the outskirts of Yanina for the next two years. The Porte forced Kurt to directly challenge Ali's disruption, and although Kurt could muster a force of 10,000 men and 100 cavalry, he would not be able to defeat Ali in the mountain passes and resorted to besieging Tepelena. Ali had no other option but to break through the siege and make way for Butrint, which Kurt interpreted as an attempt to return to the Morea. Ali's escape caused concern throughout Greece, and Kurt responded by sending 6,000 soldiers to the Bay of Arta to cut Ali off from his southern route and to trap him next to the sea, distributing funds along the way to local chieftains. Ali also recruited his own allies, including his cousin Islam Bey of Këlcyrë, the son of Sulejman Çapari and aga of Margariti Hasan Çapari, and Demoglou of Konispol. These allies kept the pasha of Delvinë's forces occupied while Ali continued further south towards Arta and Preveza. These manoeuvres alerted the Venetians, and the pashas of Trikkala and Euboea were asked to send their armies to aid Kurt. Ali, contrary to what Kurt expected, changed direction and marched towards Yanina, subduing and fortifying important villages along the way.

Kurt's troops, under the command of his son-in-law Ibrahim Bey, were unable to defeat Ali, and this resulted in a stalemate. Ali eventually retreated to Tepelena, and Kurt attempted to impress the Sublime Porte by sending severed heads as evidence of Ali's demise, but the unrest continued nonetheless. Through his actions, Ali was able to greatly undermine Kurt's authority and garner enough attention from the Venetians to establish diplomatic relations with them. In 1783, Ali sent a declaration of friendship to the Venetian administration at Corfu at the risk of an accusation of treason. Expecting to receive the title of Pasha of two tails at any moment, Ali asked them to intercede at the Sublime Porte on his behalf to hasten the process. The Venetians followed through, and in return, Ali disrupted Mustafa Koka, the Pasha of Delvinë and a political opponent of the Venetians.

=== Initial appointment ===
The Sublime Porte was still heavily in debt to the Albanian fighters who put down the Greek revolt in the Morea in 1769–1770, with astronomical sums being owed in back pay. Ali's high prestige amongst the Albanian fighters, as well as his satisfactory diplomatic solutions that normalised Venetian–Turkish relations, highlighted the fact that he was now the de facto force in the region, bypassing both Ahmet Kurt Pasha and Kara Mahmud Pasha of Shkodër. Ali was appointed mutasarrif of Ioannina at the end of 1784 or beginning of 1785 on the condition that he lead 1,000 troops on campaign, possibly as part of the military response to the Russian annexation of Crimea.

== Deposition and re-appointment ==
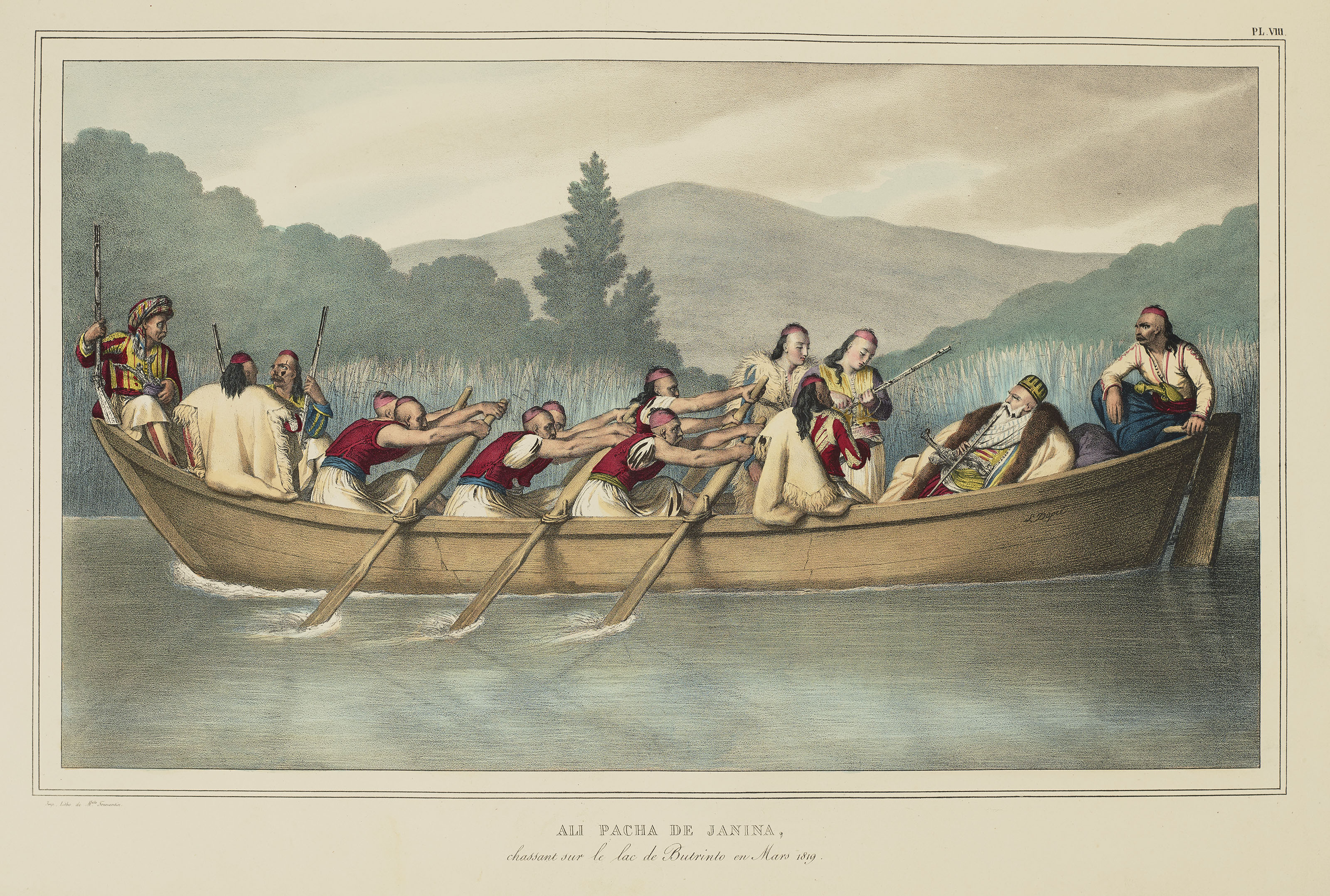
"Ali Pasha of Janina hunting in the lake of Butrint in March 1819" by Louis Dupré (1825)

Ali did not keep his promise to the Sublime Porte; instead of going on campaign for the Ottomans, Ali focused his attention on Hormovë as part of a greater effort to impose his rule over the villages and towns around Gjirokastër before eventually subjugating Gjirokastër itself. In an act of vengeance on the people of Hormovë for their part in the humiliation of his mother and sister, Ali would attack the village with over 1,000 men after lulling the town into a false sense of friendship. The men were killed, the women and children sold into slavery, and the leader of Hormovë was roasted alive on a spit above a fire. His actions intimidated the neighbouring villages into submission, earning him governorship of Ioannina soon thereafter.

Additionally, the region of Himarë was seen as a point of concern for the Sublime Porte due to its support and collaboration with the Russian Empire and Venice. Serving as the governor of Delvinë, Ali claimed jurisdiction of the region and organised a campaign in 1785. Himara held out, however, as Ali had other issues to tend to. He failed to establish secure rule over Ioannina and made enemies of the local Turkish and Greek communities, who protested to the Sublime Porte. He was dismissed from his position in favour of his rival, Kurt Pasha, and was called upon by the Sultan to campaign against Kara Mahmud Pasha Bushati of Shkodër, whose attempts at creating an independent state forced a response from the Ottomans. Ali was then sent on another campaign in the Russo-Turkish War of 1787–1792, in which he also secretly established contacts with the Russians. In reward for his services at Banat during this war, he was granted the Sanjak of Trikala in 1787, which was suffering from brigand raids. Ali's success in the pacification of brigandage in Trikala earned him the role of supervisor of the tolls of "Toskëria and Epirus".

In the meantime, Kurt Pasha had died and was succeeded by his ally in Berat, Ibrahim Pasha. The Porte awarded Ali with control of Ioannina, however, the accounts on how this occurred vary; some suggest that Ali surrounded Ioannina with his forces and presented a forged document from the Sultan without giving the Porte enough time to object, while others suggest that he gained enough support from the notables of Ioannina that they petitioned the Sultan for his appointment on his behalf. Whatever the case, the earliest known reference to Ali as the Pasha of Ioannina is dated to the 15th of March, 1788. In that same year, he delegated the title of Pasha of Trikala to his son, Veli.

=== Early consolidation ===
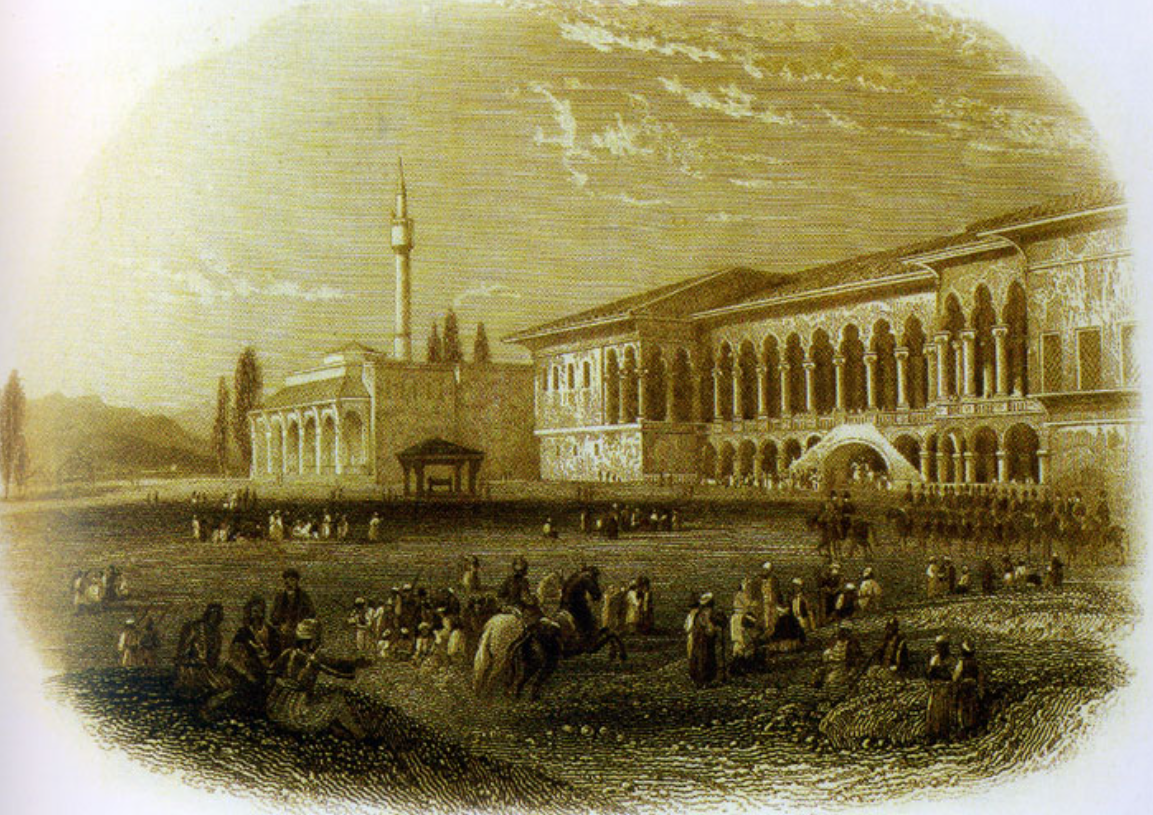
The Palace of Ali Pasha in Tepelena, engraving by Edward Finden, based on a drawing by William Purser, early 19th century

Ali Pasha secured his position by establishing relationships with influential people and rewarding his supporters and allies. He was soon appointed to the post of Dervendji-Pasha, and he began to further consolidate his power in Epirus. He married his sons to the daughters of Ibrahim Pasha in Berat in order to secure their alliance as well as the borders of his Pashalik.

During war-time, Ali Pasha could assemble an army of 50,000 Albanian men in a matter of two to three days and could double that number in two to three weeks. Leading these armed forces was Ali's Supreme Council. The Commander-in-chief was the founder and financier, Ali Pasha. Council members included Muhtar Pasha, Veli Pasha, Celâleddin Bey, Abdullah Pashe Taushani and a number of his trusted men like Hasan Dervishi, Omar Vrioni, Meço Bono, Ago Myhyrdari, Thanasis Vagias, Veli Gega and Tahir Abazi.

Ali's own perception of group identity derived from the ancient legacy of Albanian banditry along with the accompanying Albanian pseudo-nobility. Ali conceived an independent state that almost certainly would have been controlled by this Albanian military and aristocratic elite. As Pasha, Ali was supported by an exclusively Albanian military establishment, which included many people who had undertaken brigandage activities earlier in their life. Ali Pasha also used Albanian tribesmen to put down Greek rebellions in the Morea.

== Rule as Pasha ==
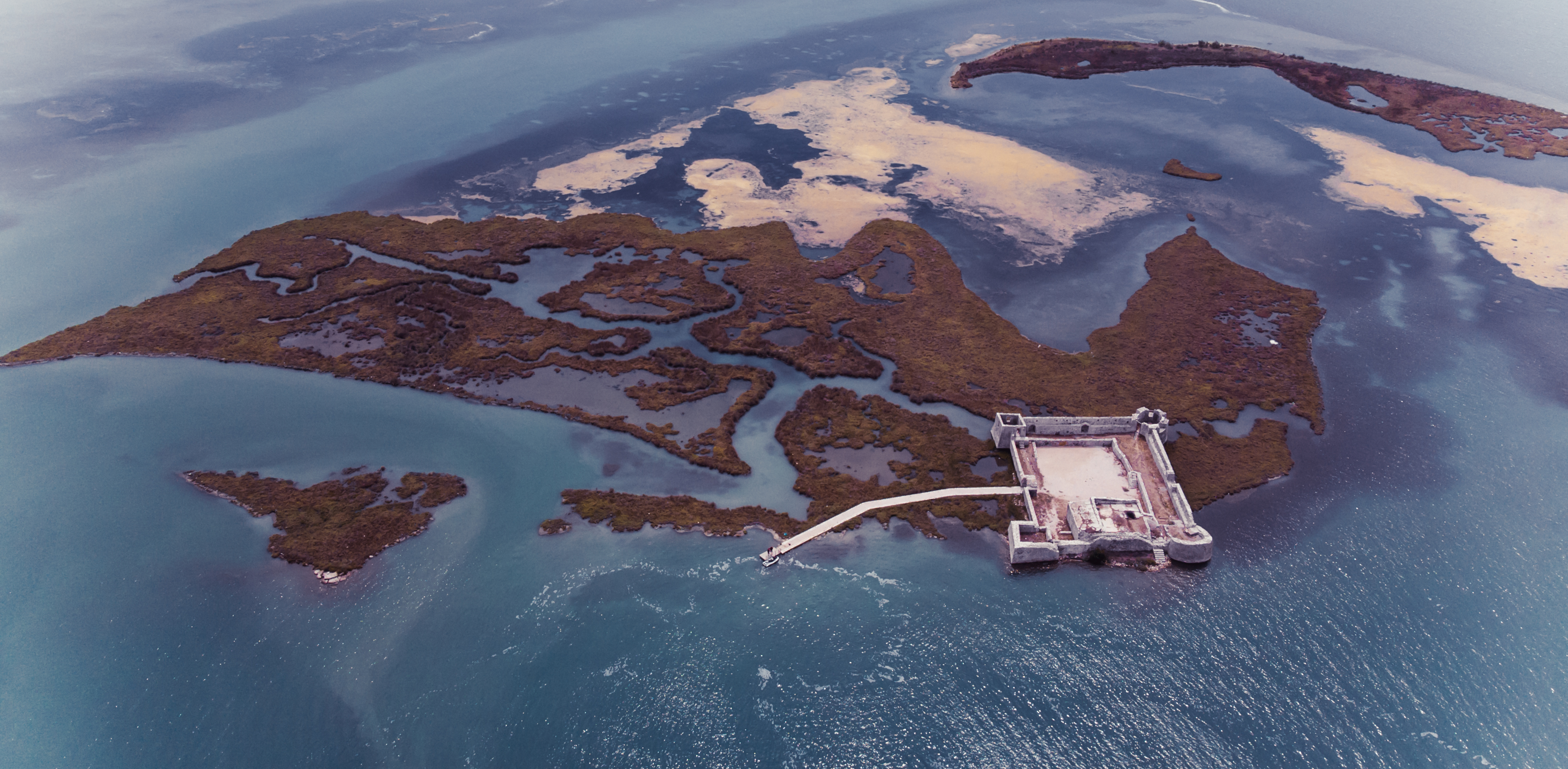
Fortifications built during Ali Pasha's reign in Butrint, Albania.

As Pasha, Ali slowly laid the foundations for the creation of an almost independent state, which included a large part of Albania and mainland Greece. During his rule, the town of Ioannina developed into a major educational, cultural, political and economic hub. In order to achieve his goals, he allied with all religious and ethnic groups in his territory. At the same time, he did not hesitate to fiercely crush any opponent, and he also developed relations with European powers. By the time of his accession to the Pashalik of Yanina, several almost-independent Albanian and Greek towns of the region reversed their approach of hostility against the Ottoman rule and pledged their loyalty to Ali. Ali's policy as ruler of Ioannina was mostly governed by expediency; he operated as a semi-independent despot and pragmatically allied himself with whoever offered the most advantage at the time. It was Ali Pasha and his Albanian soldiers and mercenaries who subdued the independent Souli.

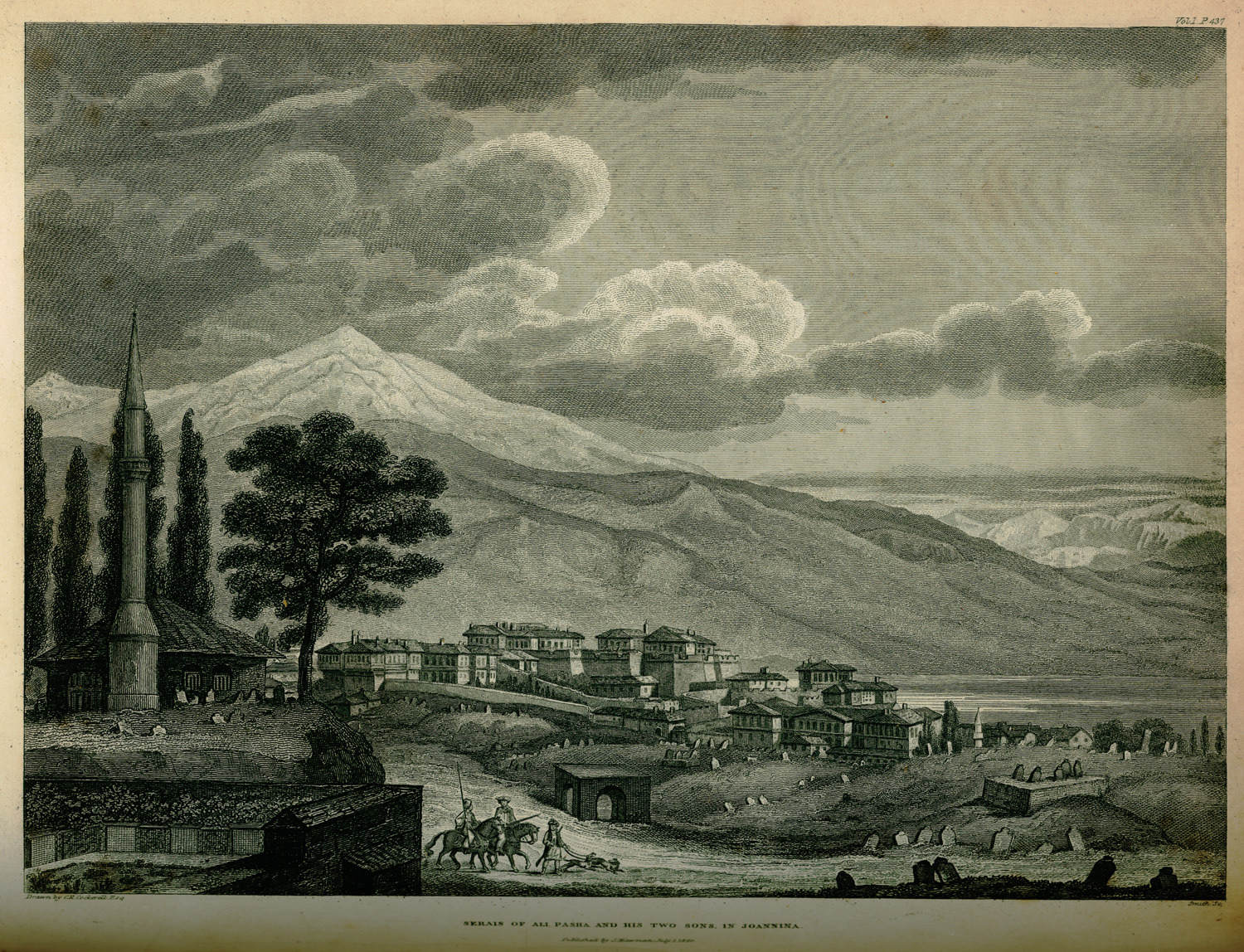
Serais of Ali Pasha and his two sons in Joannina in 1813, drawn by Charles Robert Cockerell, published in 1820 by Thomas Smart Hughes.

At this point, Ali Pasha's priority was to create a centralised governing system by neutralising the numerous disruptive factions vying for power in his Pashalik, including the klephts, armatoles, Christian notables, and Albanian beys and agas. For example, Ali replaced Greek armatoles from the territories under his control with almost exclusively Albanian armatoles. The discarded Greek armatoles became klephts and their subsequent anti-armatoloi activity was not only brigandage, but also a form of resistance against Ottoman rule. Ali also targeted wealthy Muslim landowners under the guise of bringing justice for the peasant population whilst increasing his own wealth.

In 1788, Ali's troops completed the destruction of Moscopole, a once-prosperous cultural centre in south-eastern Albania that had been continuously raided by Albanian irregulars from 1769 onwards due to their pro-Russian stance and support of the Orlov Revolt. The Aromanian population of Moscopole was forced to flee from the region and find refuge in regions outside of Ali's control, both in and out of the Ottoman Empire. Many Aromanians scattered throughout the Balkans, founding settlements such as Kruševo, but many also migrated to foreign countries, forming an Aromanian diaspora. The same campaign of persecution was launched towards Sarakatsani communities.

=== Ali and the Souliotes: Initial campaigns ===
At this point in time, the Souliotes, a Christian Albanian community whose lands were located in Ali's Pashalik, would pay their taxes to their spahi in Ioannina, Bekir Bey. Ali preferred to take the taxes directly into his own hands, and Bekir was promptly imprisoned upon his rejection of Ali's proposal. The Souliote confederacy posed a continuous threat to Ali's Pashalik by constantly raiding and terrorising the surrounding villages. The Souliotes were incited against Ali by Russian Empress Catherine the Great, who after the Treaty of Küçük Kaynarca in 1774, was acknowledged as the protector of all Orthodox Christians in the Ottoman Empire. At the behest of the Russians, the Souliotes had reportedly gathered 2,200 men who were ready to take up arms against Ali Pasha, and in response, Ali immediately mobilised his forces. With a force of 3,000 men and aided by the Çapari family of Paramythia, Ali attacked Souli, but the assault failed with considerable losses even though a Russian support fleet never materialised to help the Souliotes. The Souliotes, encouraged by their success, joined forces with klephts from the Pindus and ravaged both Greek and Albanian villages throughout Acarnania.

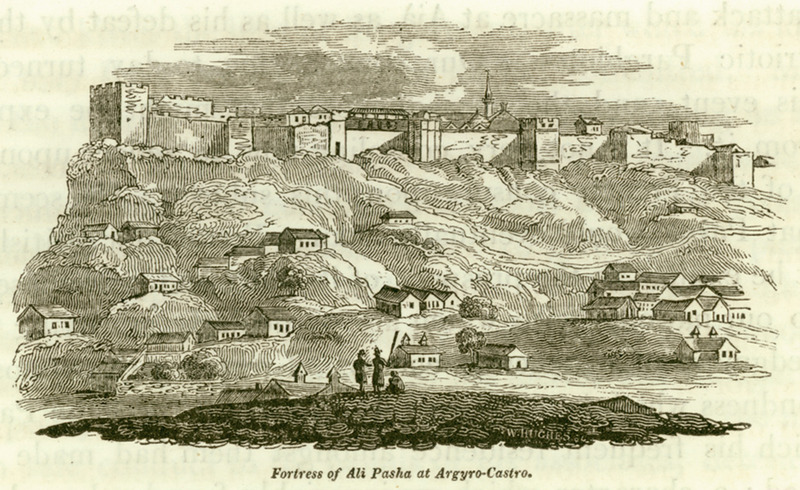
Fortress of Ali Pasha at Argyro-Castro in 1813, drawn by Charles Robert Cockerell, published in 1820 by Thomas Smart Hughes.

After failing to defeat the Souliotes via direct assault, Ali took another approach. In 1792, Ali mustered 10,000 men to attack Gjirokastër in response to the town declining his imposition of a bey, but this was all part of an elaborate plan to lure the Souliotes from their mountains. Ali wrote a letter to the Souliote captains George Botsaris and Lambros Tzavelas, in which he feigned friendship and admiration whilst asking for their assistance. The Souliotes cautiously accepted, and Botsaris wrote that, although he could not muster enough followers to join Ali, Tzavelas would join his army with 70 men as a sign of friendship. This group was placed on the front lines before Ali had Tzavelas and his men seized, chained and sent to Ioannina, with some being killed on the spot.

Ali, aided by his son Muhtar, proceeded with his attack on Souli, but Botsaris was well-prepared with solid defensive positions. The 1,300 Souliote defenders retreated from their villages and were pushed to the inner mountains of Souli. Ali attempted to coerce Lambros into betraying the Souliotes through a variety of means, and Lambros finally agreed when Ali offered him his freedom and lordship of Souli, although Lambros' 12-year-old son Fotos was taken as a guarantee. Once he was safe, Lambros sent Ali a letter revealing that he did not intend to fulfil his side of the bargain, regardless of whether he had to sacrifice his son or not, and that he would continue fighting against Ali and his men. Ali's men would fail to make further ground, and Ali would cut his losses by exchanging prisoners (including Fotos Tzavelas), paying ransoms and signing a truce. The 1792 attack ended in a Souliote victory, and in the negotiations, the Botsaris clan managed to become recognized by Ali Pasha as the lawful representative clan of Souli and George Botsaris as the one who would enforce the terms of peace among the Souliotes. Ali, however, would not forget this humiliation.

=== Consolidation ===
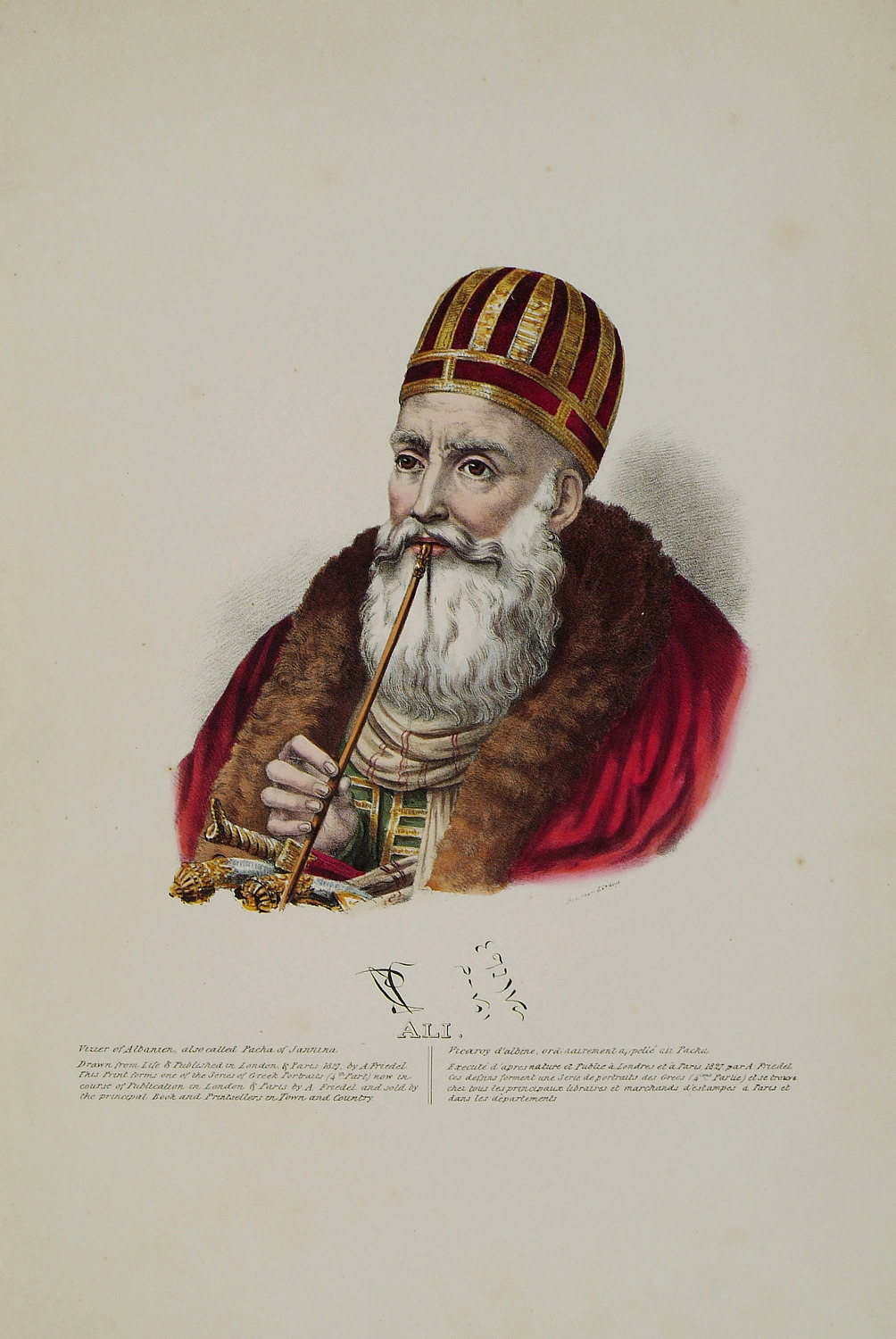
Ali, Vizier of Albania, also called Pacha of Jannina by Adam Friedel, drawn from life and published in 1828.

Despite his setback in Souli, Ali Pasha retained an influential standing in Constantinople. For example, Ali managed to use his influence to reverse the death penalty imposed on the Pasha of Negroponte after he pleaded to Ali for help. Although he had obtained his power through force in a lawless environment, it was crucial for Ali Pasha to maintain peace and stability to ensure that his coffers remained full. Ali would offer protection to towns and villages in return for their loyalty, thereby increasing his control over his expanding territories by appointing his representatives and negotiating appropriate terms and tax arrangements.

Correspondence from Ali's subjects during this period make heavy use of flattering and obsequious phrases whilst Ali's replies are terse and factual, reflecting the power dynamic between them; villagers often wrote to Ali with complaints about the Souliotes thieving their sheep or about raids from klephts, usually from neighbouring villages. The people of Kokosi in Thessaly wrote to Ali in 1794 on behalf of Platini Scourpi, Koffi and other villages, requesting the prolonged stay of one of Ali's boluk-bashis (officers) with his men to continue protecting them from bandits. The villagers of Kato Soudena also offered to pay Ali Pasha so that they may be placed under his protection. Ali did not only provide protection from bandits, however, as he offered protection from the Sultan's tax collectors as well, interfering with the collection and disposal of government tax revenue through the bribery of officials or the allocation of tax collecting duties to his family and supporters. In fact, the higher ranks of the Greek Orthodox Church colluded with Ali to the extent that bishops were willing to act as his tax collectors. By pledging their loyalty to Ali, communities could put themselves under his jurisdiction.

At times, Ali Pasha would pay to bring a community under his jurisdiction. Villages would even threaten to separate, such as in 1802 when the inhabitants of Chebelovo complained that Ali favoured their neighbours over them. Communities that were unhappy with Ali's rule were able to appeal to the Ottoman kadi courts or the central government itself, so it was crucial that Ali maintained good standing with his connections in Constantinople since his position as dervendji-pasha was never totally secure. When one of Ali's lobbyists in the Phanariot elite informed Ali that there was a rival bid for control of the passes in 1797, Ali was encouraged to make a higher offer to the treasury and to ameliorate relations with the local communities he collected taxes from, as their complaints could serve as a justification for the authorities granting control of the passes to his rival.

By 1798, Ali Pasha's influence extended to Veroia. He was made governor of Thessaly in 1799 to clear the region of bandits, soon followed by all of Rumeli. Ali was able to extract taxes beyond the strictly defined borders of his realm, as his power extended beyond the areas that were formally recognised as his. By 1803, several villages in the district of Florina were finalising the terms of their tax collection with Ali, and Ali's tax-collecting powers would eventually extend as far north as Prilep by assuming fake identities as a tax-farmer.

The principal role of geography in the communal groups of his time were comprehended by Ali. He insisted that Ioannina, located in the Greek district of Epirus, was Albanian. He also considered the Albanian population who lived in the area not as immigrants but as indigenous people of the region. He tried to justify his plans on the territories under foreign protectorate on the Ionian coast also by insisting that they were part of "Albania" as well.

Language was a defining element of Ali's identity, as well as of his government and the region he controlled in general. Ali's native language was Albanian. His degree of proficiency in written Greek is debatable, but it is known that he was able to speak the language. Albanians and Greeks exchanging languages was quite common in the 18th century. Ioannina was located in a largely Greek-speaking area, and during the Ottoman rule the Albanian language has not been officially recognized. Albanian has become a fully written language with its own script only from the mid-19th century, while written Greek was a well established language within the Ottoman Empire. The formal bureaucratic language of the Empire was entirely replaced with Greek in the pashalik, and in Ali's court diplomatic business was exclusively conducted in Greek as well as much of the formal correspondence. Ali also used the Greek script to write in Albanian and to transliterate Turkish in his personal correspondence.

=== Ali Pasha and the European powers ===
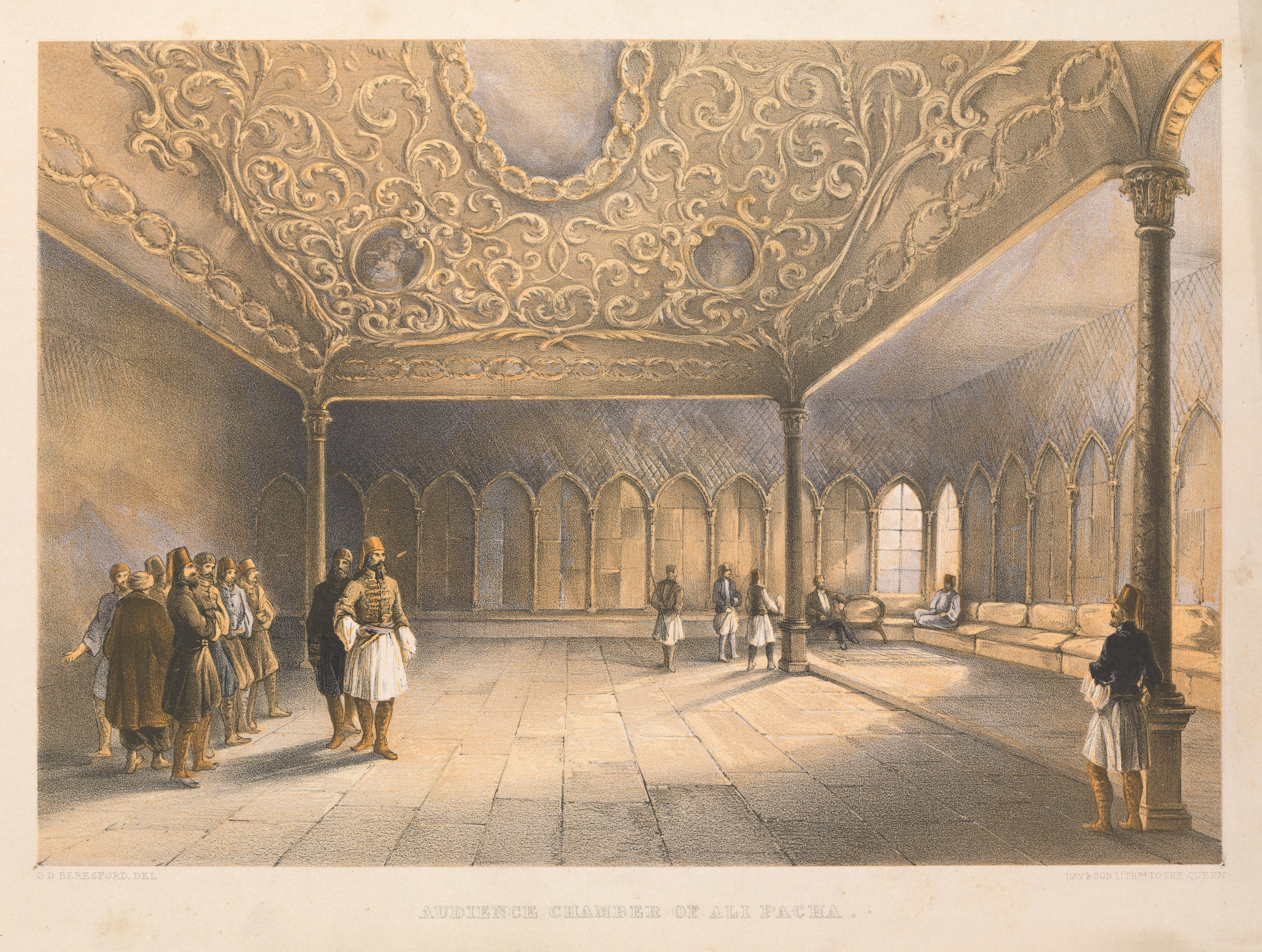
Audience chamber of Ali Pacha in Ioannina, Albania (subsequently Greece), c. 1800, by George de la Poer Beresford, published in 1855.

The stability brought about by Ali Pasha's reign allowed the regional centre of Ioannina to become more cosmopolitan, connecting Ali to an international network. As his fame grew, so to did the number of foreigners in his court. Ali wanted to establish a sea-power in the Mediterranean which would be a counterpart of that of the Dey of Algiers, Ahmed ben Ali. However, in order to gain a seaport on the Albanian coast, Ali Pasha had to deal with Venice, which controlled the ports and the Ionian straits. The Venetians had obtained an agreement from the Sublime Porte in 1788 that barred Turkish vessels from accessing these Venetian holdings, as well as banning Ottoman gun emplacements within a mile of the coast. These conditions obstructed trade in Epirus as well as Ali Pasha's ambitions.

Significant geopolitical shifts occurred in the Europe prior to Ali Pasha challenging Venice. The Treaty of Jassy in 1792, which allowed Greeks to sail under the Russian flag, significantly boosted Greek shipping and trade with the Crimea. The French Revolution's influence reached Ali's domain, with the French becoming a powerful force in the area. French consul Esprit-Marie Cousinéry, a supporter of Greek independence, and de Lassale, the consul of Preveza, discussed the possibility of French support in Ali's ambitions. Lassale's mission included securing timber from Epirus for the French Navy, thereby offering arms and ammunition to Ali for subduing Suli and Himara.

By 1797, Venice fell to Napoleon, leading to the Treaty of Campo Formio, in which the Ionian Islands and neighbouring ports were transferred to France. These strategic locations, long coveted by Ali, were now under French control. Ali, using the alias 'Mustafa', allegedly held the governorship of Arta from 1796. The French established garrisons and a naval presence in the region, and were welcomed as liberators in places like Preveza. Napoleon's growing influence and victories inspired many in Europe, including the subjugated populations who saw the French advances as a liberation march. This environment set the stage for Ali Pasha's manoeuvres to strengthen his position, and he formed an alliance with Napoleon I of France, who had established François Pouqueville as his general consul in Ioannina, with the complete consent of the Ottoman Sultan Selim III. The French already had consuls at Arta and Preveza when Ali Pasha unsuccessfully tried to approach Louis XVI as a precautionary guarantee to protect him from his opponents in the Ottoman capital.

Likewise, the British government, which opened in 1769 for the first time a consulate in Arta, established a permanent consular representation by 1803 and appointed John Philip Morier as "General Council in the Morea and Albania", centred in Ali Pasha's capital, Ioannina. This probably represents the earliest official recognition of the name "Albania" by the British government.

==== Cooperation with the French ====
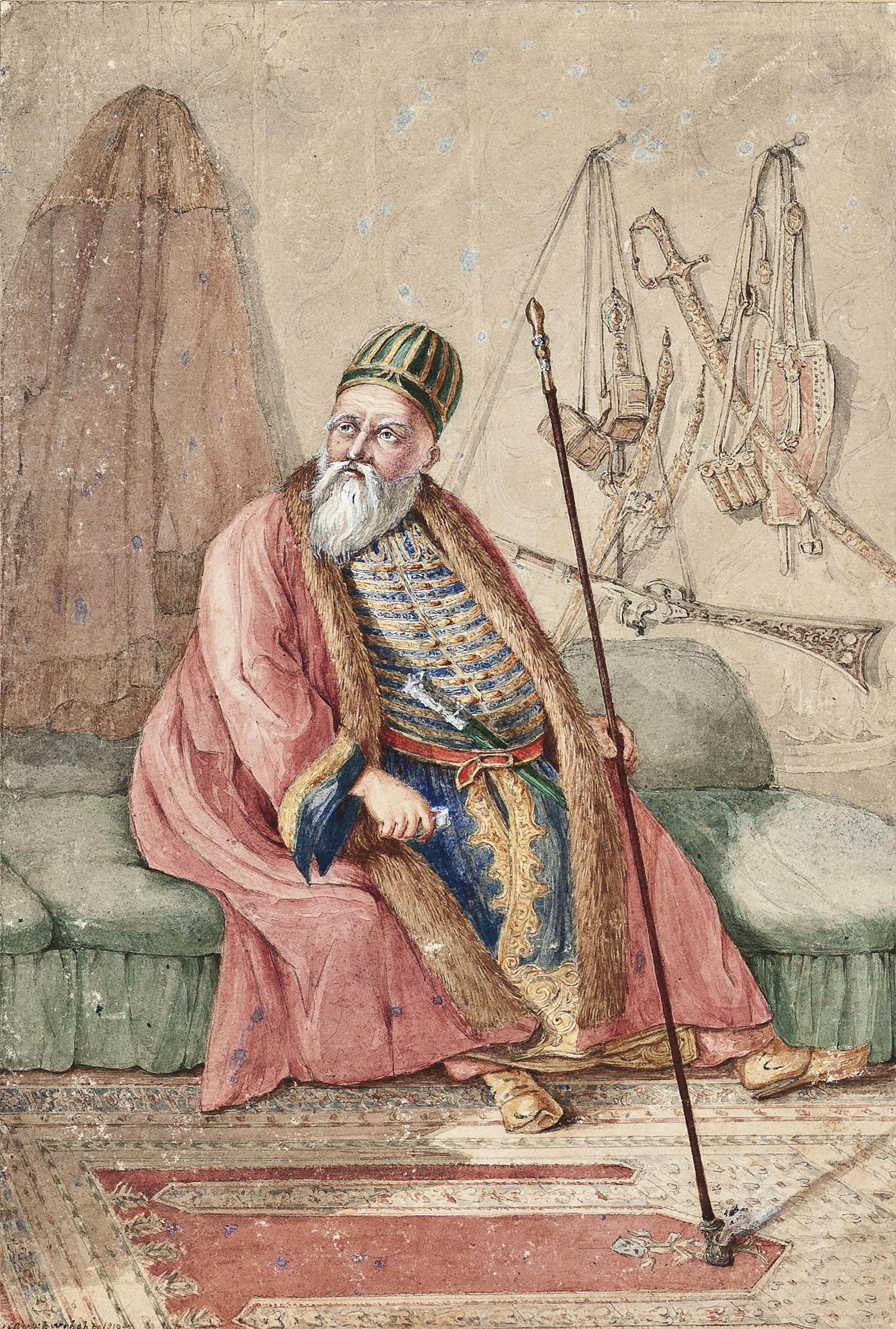
Portrait of Ali Pasha by J. Cartwright, 1819

Ali Pasha navigated the changing political landscape as the French sought to undermine Venetian influence in the region. Professing animosity towards the Venetian aristocracy, Ali secretly communicated with Napoleon, then in northern Italy, despite the risk of treason as France and the Ottoman Empire edged towards war. The French, eager to counter the power of the Ottomans, assisted Ali in ending the independence of the Himariotes. Ali impressed the French, particularly General Antoine Gentili, with his admiration for Napoleon, and he even arranged a marriage between his alleged illegitimate daughter and a French adjutant general. In a clandestine meeting, Ali sought military assistance and naval access around Corfu.

Influenced by Ali's charm and strategic considerations as well as Himara's ties to the Neapolitan Army opposing Napoleon and the French, Gentili collaborated with Ali in a surprise attack on Nivicë in 1798, a town which at this point was the most prosperous on the coastal littoral Butrint and Vlorë. Gentili ferried Ali's troops through the Ionian straits by night in contravention of the treaty between the Venetians and the Porte. Landing in the bay at Lukovë to the north, Ali's troops outflanked the town, which is situated at the entrance to the narrow valley which leads into Himara from the landward side. Ali's men attacked Nivica and Shën Vasili, the neighbouring village to the north, on Easter Sunday when the inhabitants were at prayer, taking the town and other villages and then reducing them to ruins. They ravaged as far north as Himara itself, and it was said that 6,000 unarmed civilians were slaughtered in the process (some by roasting alive and impalement) whilst the rest of the population were sent to Ali's farms near Trikkala. Their land was then divided up and partitioned for cultivation by Ali's subjects in Saranda. Ali left a small square fortress at Shën Vasili to guard the entrance to Himara and to watch over the remaining population of Nivica. This campaign led to the annexation of Himara, extending Ali's control along the coast to Vlorë.

Concurrently, during the winter of 1797–1798, Ali dealt with regional conflicts at the request of the Ottomans, particularly against the rebel governor Osman Pazvantoğlu who had begun carving out his own polity centred around Vidin in modern Bulgaria. The Ottomans had already dispatched a force of 50,000–100,000 men under Küçük Hüseyin Pasha to crush the rebellion, and they sent for Ali's help. Ali, reluctant to appear subservient to the Sultan particularly in the face of the French, had his subjects in Karpenisi write to the patriarch of Constantinople and inform him that they were in fear of banditry should Ali leave them unprotected. This failed, and Ali was forced to take to the field personally with a force of 20,000 Albanians, leaving Mukhtar in charge in Ioannina. Despite the eventual failure of the Ottoman campaign once Ali left the Ottoman army and the subsequent pardoning of Pazvantoğlu, Ali Pasha and his Albanians distinguished themselves during the fighting, earning Ali the title "Aslan" (the Lion) from the Porte.

However, Ali Pasha's engagement in this campaign and the French's anger over his actions against their ally Pazvantoğlu strained his relations with France. Ali, in turn, was also disappointed with the failure of French promises of support; aside from pledges of financial and military support, the French had even offered Ali Pasha the crown of Albania once they had taken the Morea, but it became increasingly clear that this was not going to occur. Indeed, British traveller Henry Holland reported in 1815 that during a personal conversation with Ali it apparently emerged that Napoleon, at a certain point, had promised Ali the position of King of Albania, but Holland also remarked that Ali was not convinced by the offer, because he distrusted the French. As such, Ali's alliance with France continued to sour. Upon his return to Ioannina, Ali felt compelled to align with the Sultan's efforts to expel the French from Epirus, marking a significant shift in his regional allegiances.

=== Conflict with the French ===
==== Conquest of Preveza ====
In June 1798, as the French advanced their ambitions in Ottoman-controlled Egypt, Ali Pasha was engaged in the siege of Vidin along the Danube. Despite being distant, Ali received reports from his son Mukhtar on the situation in Epirus. These reports detailed subversive activities by the French, particularly their efforts to incite revolt among the Souliotes through the distribution of leaflets and tricolour cockades. Recognizing the potential threat to his rule, Ali obtained special permission from the Sultan to return to Epirus to address these issues whilst maintaining diplomatic communications with the French as he still contemplated a strategic alliance with them. He purportedly offered to join forces with the French in exchange for control over the island of Santa Maura as well as former Venetian territories on the mainland, and the right to station a garrison on Corfu. However, General Louis François Jean Chabot, the commander-in-chief of the French forces on Corfu, rejected this proposal. By September 1798, with the declaration of war between the French and the Ottomans, Ali's stance became clear.

Ali Pasha quickly assembled his forces, although historical accounts differ as to whether Ali secured a commission to confront the French through diplomatic channels in Constantinople or whether the Porte's slow response led Ali to unilaterally mobilize over 20,000 troops against a potential French invasion. Ali did not wait for the French to act and strategically positioned his troops near Butrint, setting a trap for the French. He lured the French adjutant general Rose, who was temporarily in charge at Corfu, to a meeting near Igoumenitsa. Rose, wrongfully believing in Ali's professed allegiance to the French, was taken prisoner, tortured, and sent to Ioannina in chains; the same tactic would be used on the French sub-lieutenant in Butrint.

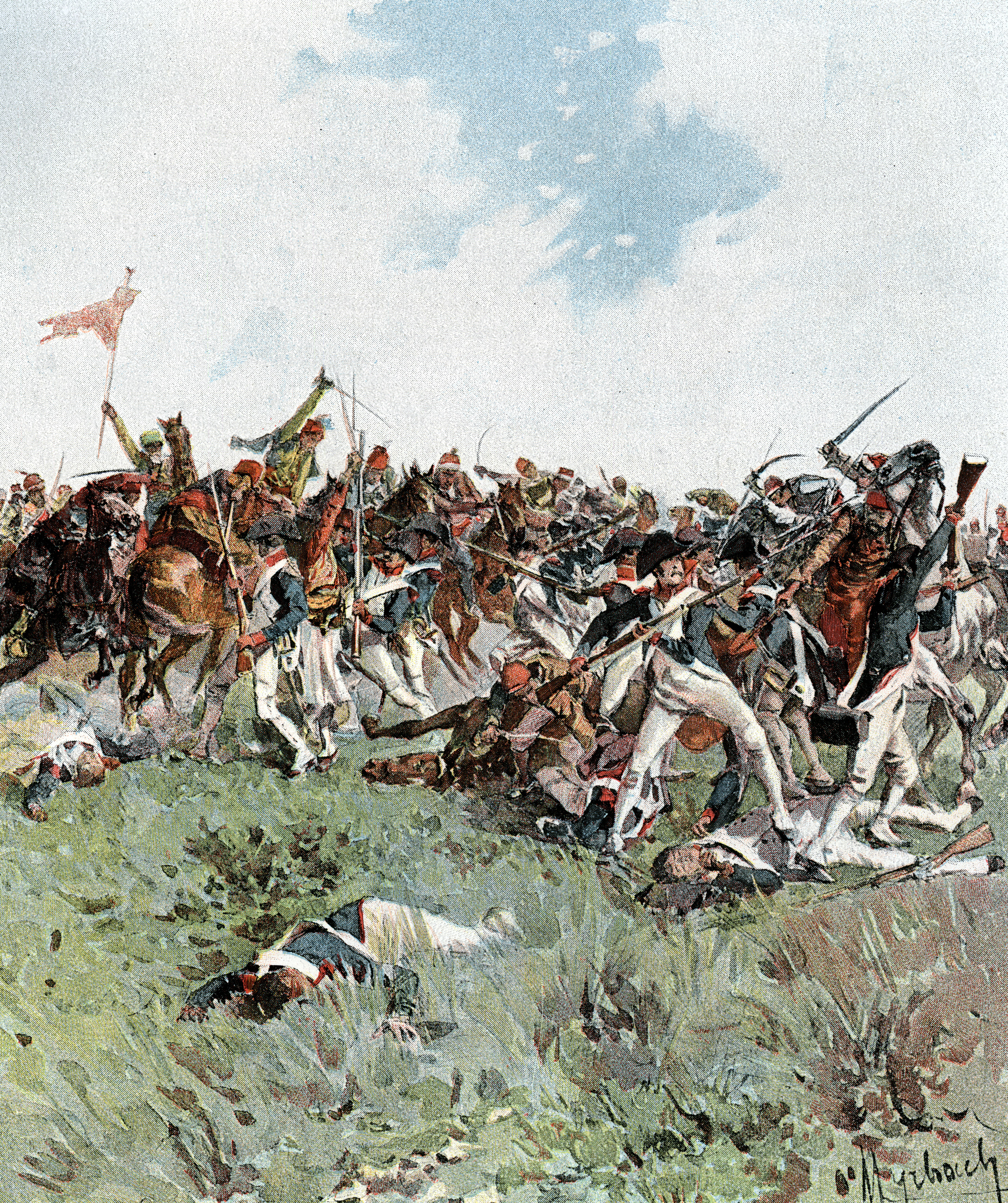
Ali's cavalry at the Battle of Nicopolis

In October 1798, after securing Butrint and Igoumenitsa, Ali's troops attacked the coastal town of Preveza, which was defended by a small garrison of French troops, Souliote fighters, Ionian islanders and local pro-French Greeks. Ali's campaign was made easier by his former enemy, the Albanian chieftain George Botsaris of Souli, who allowed Ali's men passage through Souliote territory in exchange for a payment. The battle itself occurred on the 12th of October as Ali observed from a vantage point above Nicopolis in the same location where Roman Emperor Augustus had watched the Battle of Actium. Ali observed as his son Mukhtar lead a cavalry charge, and the hastily constructed French defences were soon overwhelmed by Ali's superior forces, which aside from Albanians also included Greeks and Albanian Souliotes. The fall of Preveza was further aided by Metropolitan Ignatios of Arta, an agent of Ali, who effectively weakened the resolve of the Greek defenders through counter-propaganda.

When the town was finally conquered, a major slaughter occurred against the local people as retaliation for their resistance. Ali ordered the execution of 300 Greeks in front of him, and when a number of those who fled returned on the false promise of amnesty, 170 of them were executed. Survivors were marched to Ioannina bearing the severed and salted heads of their companions, and were subjected to jeers and abuse from the pro-Ottoman populace as they marched at the head of a grand procession organised by Ali Pasha for his victorious troops. The women and young girls were sold into slavery. Notable among the captured French was Louis-Auguste Camus de Richemont, the commander of the French engineers, who was spared due to Mukhtar's admiration for his bravery. Along with other survivors, including the captured French grenadiers and officers, they were sent to Constantinople. There, they were imprisoned in the Yedikule Fortress.

The massacre at Preveza had far-reaching implications, influencing the rise of Greek nationalism and being remembered in songs and literature by figures such as Lord Byron. Preveza was left in ruins as the properties of the Greeks were seized by Ali and redistributed among his Albanians. The surviving population was displaced to the marshlands around the Ambracian Gulf, and the town's population was estimated to have drastically fallen from 16,000 to 3,000 inhabitants. Nonetheless, Ali transformed Preveza into a naval base and one of his favoured residences, earning it the moniker "Portsmouth of Albania."

==== Corfu and the Ionian Islands ====
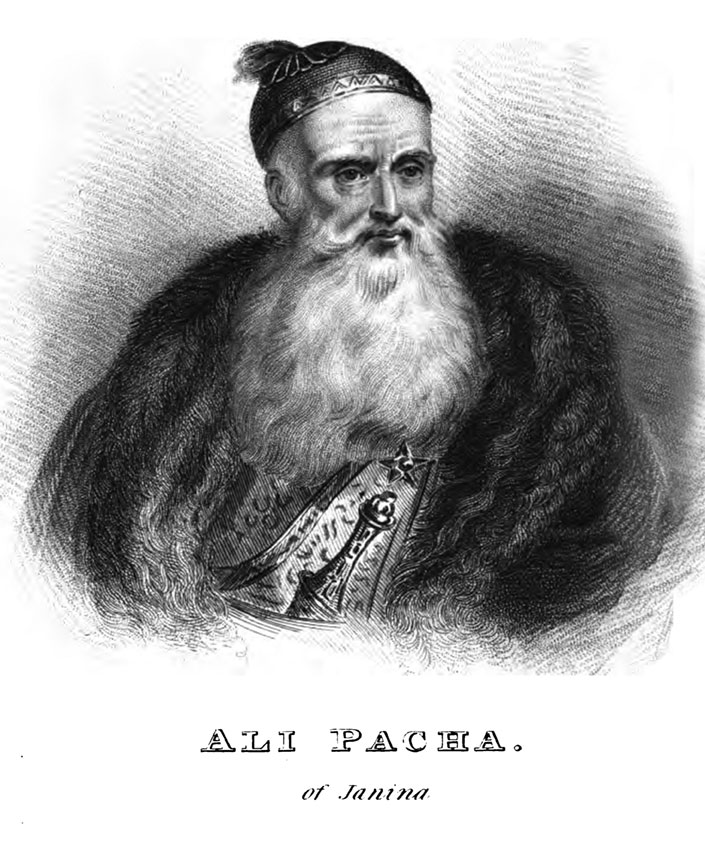
A posthumous illustration of Ali Pasha of Ioannina, circa 1824

After the conquest of Preveza, Ali Pasha shifted his focus to Vonica, located across the Ambracian Gulf. This time, the town capitulated without resistance, surrendering after the intervention of Archbishop Ignatios, who acted on Ali's behalf. Ali then focused on Parga, a refuge for those fleeing Turkish rule and a longstanding irritant to Epirus' rulers. Ali extended an offer of autonomy to Parga, which the inhabitants resolutely declined, citing their commitment to liberty and opposition to tyranny. This resistance would become another thorn in Ali's side. Meanwhile, Ali's ambitions extended to Aetolia-Acarnania, southeast of Vonica. His attempts to exert influence there were initially thwarted by the Ottoman government, which granted the region as a royal domain to Mihrişah Valide Sultan, Sultan Selim III's mother. This move forced Ali to retreat from direct confrontation with the Porte, despite his efforts to maintain favourable relations with Mihrişah and her associates.

Ali's territorial aspirations also included Santa Maura (Lefkada), an Ionian island close to the mainland. However, international developments, particularly Napoleon's Egyptian campaign, complicated his plans. After joining the Second Coalition against France, the Ottoman Empire side-lined Ali as a Russian-Turkish fleet moved to capture the Ionian Islands from the French. Ali's attempts to negotiate control of the island were interrupted by the arrival of this fleet. Parga, seizing the opportunity, placed itself under Russian protection, further hindering Ali's territorial ambitions. The Russo-Turkish forces eventually captured Corfu, ending French rule in the Ionian Islands. Ali and his sons contributed to the siege, albeit in a diversionary role, which nonetheless enhanced his reputation, reportedly earning commendation from Admiral Horatio Nelson. In 1800, the Ionian Islands were formed into the Septinsular Republic, a tributary state of the Ottoman Empire, with specific conditions to respect the islands' autonomy and religious freedom. The Russians would eventually place the republic under their de facto military occupation.

Despite the removal of foreign powers from the mainland, Ali faced limitations in exerting direct control over important ports. His attempts to dominate Parga were met with resistance, as the Pargians, aided by the Suliotes, preferred direct dealings with the Porte. This stalemate continued even after the Treaty of Amiens in 1802, which Britain and France briefly endorsed. The resumption of hostilities between Britain and France in 1803 saw Ali reaching out to the British Embassy for guidance, marking the beginning of official British contact with him. Ali's aggressive actions against towns under French influence were rationalized by his hagiographer Haxhi Shehreti as efforts to suppress Greek insurrection on behalf of the Sultan. However, this justification seemed redundant, given that these towns were not under Turkish rule and were embroiled in a war with France, and the situation was further complicated by increasing Greek nationalist sentiment fuelled by French interference.

==== The Defeat of the Souliotes ====
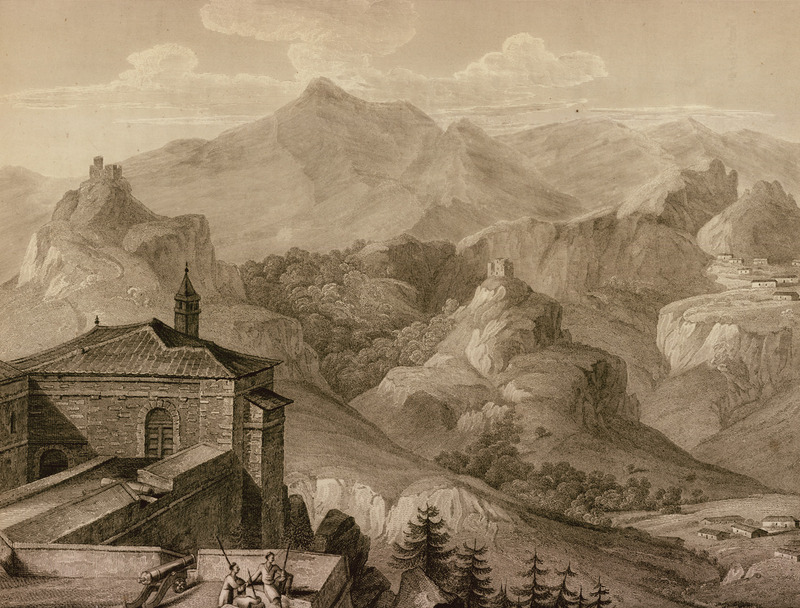
View of Suli and its surrounding scenery from a window of the Great Fortress in 1813, drawn by Charles Robert Cockerell, published in 1820 by Thomas Smart Hughes.

The French aided the Souliotes by funnelling money and supplies through Parga, hoping to weaken the Ottoman Empire. In response, the Porte obliged Ali Pasha to eliminate the Souliote threat, and Ali proceeded by commencing a war of attrition with the help of the Çapari family of Margariti. Ali had learned from previous failures that direct assaults were futile, and so he blockaded Suli with a ring of 12 fortresses, with the one at Gliki controlling the only road into Suli. The slow construction of these fortresses was further complicated by Souliote sharpshooters, and an estimated third of Ali's troops deserted.

Simultaneously, in 1802, Ali finally managed to take Delvinë after seven years of conflict which were said to have destroyed much of the surrounding settlements. This granted Ali control of Epirus from Arta to Tepelenë and Vlorë, with Suli being the only region that still held out against him. The Souliotes, however, had their own share of struggles; in 1800, the chieftain of the Souliotes, George Botsaris, received a large sum and the position of the armatolos of Tzoumerka, and so the Botsaris clan left Souli and settled in Vourgareli of Arta. This was the first time that a Souliot clan became part of the Ottoman political system. The departure of the Botsaris clan weakened Souli as they were a significant part of its force, and George also took valuable munitions from the Souliotes when he departed.

Fotos Tzavelas, son of Lambros, became the new leader of the Souliotes, who were running out of supplies whilst Ali Pasha's army of 20,000 continuously received imperial supplies. Ali finally attacked in autumn of 1803, and in response, most of the Souliotes gathered at the stronghold of Kungi above the village of Suli with their supplies running increasingly low. Out of desperation, the Souliotes decided that those who wished to surrender would be allowed to do so, and Ali saw this as an opportunity to take the Souliote leaders hostage and expel the Souliotes from their stronghold. Ali's son Veli arranged for the surrender of the Souliotes with their leader Fotos, but a faction of the Souliotes preferred death instead. This faction, led by a monk known as Last Judgement Samuel and with the knowledge of Fotos, waited for Ali's troops to come and take the arsenal; once the soldiers had entered, the monk and his five collaborators set fire to the magazines and blew up the arsenal.

The Souliotes, numbering to 4,000 survivors, agreed to abandon Suli and left to find refuge in Parga and the Ionian Islands as their four villages were destroyed. Some, however, trusted in Veli and remained. The conquest of Souli subsequently gave rise to numerous legends and stories, such as the Dance of Zalongo, which is portrayed in a number of ways in different versions. The exiled Souliote men went into military service wherever they could, such as for the Russians, the French, the Ottomans or even Ali himself. Souliote men who were captured during the conquest were tortured to death and then impaled or burnt, whilst captured Souliote women and children were enslaved in harems.

Ali's victory over the Souliotes affected the relationships of the local communities as Muslims and Christians in the region were generally on good terms. For example, Fotos Tzavelas was the blood brother of Islam Pronjo, the most powerful Albanian bey in Paramythia, and the Pronjo family was secretly passing information onto the Souliotes despite serving under Ali's banner. Ali was aware of this, and after fabricating an alliance between the Pronjo family and his rival Ibrahim Pasha of Berat, he expelled the family from Paramythia and destroyed the settlement. Likewise, Ali confiscated the properties of the Çapari family in 1807, who then sought refuge in the Ionian Islands before joining the Albanian ruler Muhammad Ali Pasha who had taken control of Egypt. The Çapari family returned to their homes only after Ali's death, resuming their positions as tax collectors and Chiflik holders. Additionally, Ali's wife of at least thirty years, Emine, had died around this time. Ali's third son, Selim, was born to one of Ali's slaves at the end of 1802, indicating that his domestic matters were complicated.

=== Ali as Beylerbey ===
It has been suggested that Ali Pasha received the title of Beylerbey of Rumelia as a reward for his conquest of Suli. However, whilst Ali was dealing with the Souliotes, the klephts continued their rampant banditry whilst Osman Pazvantoğlu resumed his raids along the Danube. By 1801, the constant threat of Muslim hajduks and Christian klephts forced Selim III to extend the dictatorial powers of the previous beylerbey - Hadji Mehmed Pasha - for another two years, with the Sultan eventually appointing Ali Pasha to take Hadji's place on 28 January 1803.

Ali ordered the neighbouring pashas to gather their forces and amassed a vast army of 80,000 troops to be used as a show of force in areas rampant with banditry. He first toured the new territories in Macedonia that were now under his control and ordered that they be provided with food and money, saving the locals from making such expenses. He then proceeded to pacify and punish those who had caused unrest throughout Rumelia before camping outside the walls of Plovdiv in the spring of 1804, finally deciding to return home with the loot he had obtained from the bandits. When he returned to Ioannina, he met with John Philip Morier and discussed the possibility of Epirus becoming an independent state with the help of the British.

Nonetheless, the klephts near Ali's realm continued their activities, and Ali used the current state of affairs to leverage more power from the Sultan. In 1806, a year after the death of Mihrişah, Ali finally managed to gain control of Karli-Eli. This meant that Ali's realm encircled the southern Pindus mountains, where klephts such as Antonis Katsantonis operated. Although Russian propaganda had begun influencing the klephts and armatoloi, the ideals of national identity were not fully existent at this time. Prominent band captains like Nikotsaras and Demitrios Palaeopolos served Ali Pasha as armatoloi on numerous occasions, but Nikotsaras became a bandit after shooting a Turkish soldier and caused so much trouble in Thessaly that the authorities put a bounty on him. After taking a hiatus from banditry, Nikotsaras was forgiven by Ali, who reinstated him as one of his armatoloi, but Nikotsaras would join the Serbian Revolution soon after.

==== Siege of Santa Maura (Lefkada) ====
With the outbreak of the Russo-Turkish War in 1806, Ali decided to attack the Ionian Islands as a show of loyalty to the Sultan whilst using the war as a pretext to subjugate the coastal Epirote towns directly under the control of the Sublime Porte. Ali sent his son Veli Pasha to drive out the governor in Preveza and to subjugate Butrint, Igoumenitsa and Vonitsa, and he subsequently imposed his own system of governance and tax collection and confiscated properties in the cities.

Parga, however, opposed Ali's advances yet again, this time with the support of a Russian garrison from Corfu. Ali demanded that the Russians give up the Souliotes who had taken refuge on the Ionian Islands along with the klephts from the Morea who had fled Veli's attacks, such as Theodoros Kolokotronis, and when these demands were refused. Ali prepared to attack Santa Maura, the location of exile for many of the Greek captains and their men, and he was aided by the French due to his good relations with Napoleon Bonaparte. The defense of Santa Maura was organised by Ioannis Kapodistrias, who commanded a force of Greek volunteers and Russian troops, including a regiment of 3,000 irregular light riflemen that consisted of Himariotes, Souliotes, Albanians and Greeks. A stand-off between the two sides ensued as they engaged in skirmishes, and the siege was interrupted when Ali had to return to Ioannina with 1,600 men to meet with emissaries sent by the Sultan.

Ali's efforts were thwarted by Napoleon's victory against the Russians at the Battle of Friedland. This victory resulted in the signing of the Treaty of Tilsit in 1807, in which the Russians placed the Ionian Islands, Butrint, Preveza, Vonitsa and Parga back under French protection. Ioannis Kapodistrias notified Ali of the new situation, to which Ali replied that the truce has nothing to do with him but that he would honour it as long as no armatoli were left on the mainland. As a result, Ali would keep Butrint, Vonitsa and Preveza, but Parga would be transferred over to French forces by the Russian garrison.

==== Ali and the Klephts ====
The klephts and the armatoli were pushed towards a common cause by the actions of Ali Pasha and the Ottoman authorities, and under French influence, this began to develop into a more idealistic plan for the future. In 1807, the captains of the bands of Santa Maura met together with other klephts who operated in Macedonia and the Pindus Mountains at the Evangelistria Monastery at Skiathos and swore an 'Oath of Freedom'. They began to raid Ali's holdings in Thessaly, but Nikotsaras - one of the main klephts in this group - was killed during one of these raids. Demitrios Palaeopolos and Thymios Vlachavas fought against Ali's troops in the mountain passes, and the idea of a klepht revolt overthrowing Ali was considered a favourable turn of events by the senior Ottoman officials who were concerned with Ali's increasing power.

In response, Ali's son Mukhtar was sent with 4,000 soldiers to destroy the klephts in 1808. The klepht movement began to degenerate into brigandage, and they targeted both Greeks and Muslims indiscriminately as support for their cause disintegrated. With the aid of Ali's informers and particularly the betrayal of a klepht called Deligiannis, the klepht band was captured in the Pindus Mountains on the road to Trikkala. Demitrios Palaeopolos and Thymios Vlachavas were imprisoned for two years before escaping to Constantinople, with Palaeopolos seeking asylum from the French and leaving for Moldavia. Vlachavas obtained a firman from the Sublime Porte to guarantee his protection and returned to Ioannina, where he met with Ali. As Vlachavas was leaving the room, Ali had him arrested, imprisoned and eventually Ioannina once he had obtained permission from the Porte. Vlachavas' remains, which were cut to pieces, were hung up on display in Ioannina, and Ali's soldiers destroyed the Monastery of St. Dimitrios at Meteora where Vlachavas had sought refuge.

In 1809, one of Ali's captains - Ago Myhyrdari - had finally captured the klepht Antonis Katsantonis, who had been weakened by smallpox. Katsatonis was tortured and executed in public by having his bones broken with a sledgehammer.

== Ali's growing independence ==
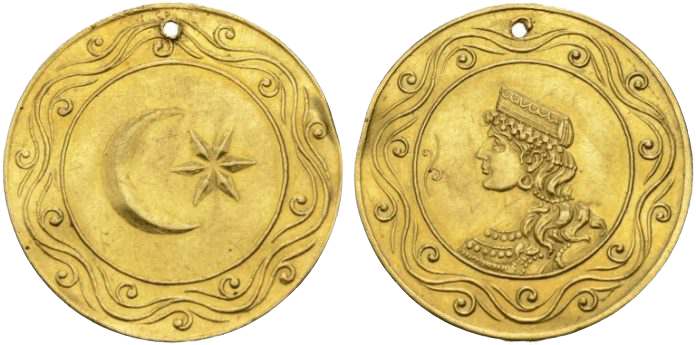
Medallion attributed to Ali Pasha, 1807

Ali Pasha's realm became increasingly independent, and he had begun to employ agents throughout Europe to further his ambitions. Even though the Ottomans and the British were at odds, Ali maintained relations with Britain and shifted his allegiance towards them once the French received the Ionian Islands from the Russians. Ali had numerous meetings with William Martin Leake in November 1807, with the most important being held in secret on 12 November near Nicopolis. Ali had hoped that Britain would invade the Ionian Islands on his behalf, whereas Leake utilised Ali to reconcile Britain and the Porte. The French, however, continued to pressure Ali to hand over Butrint to them.

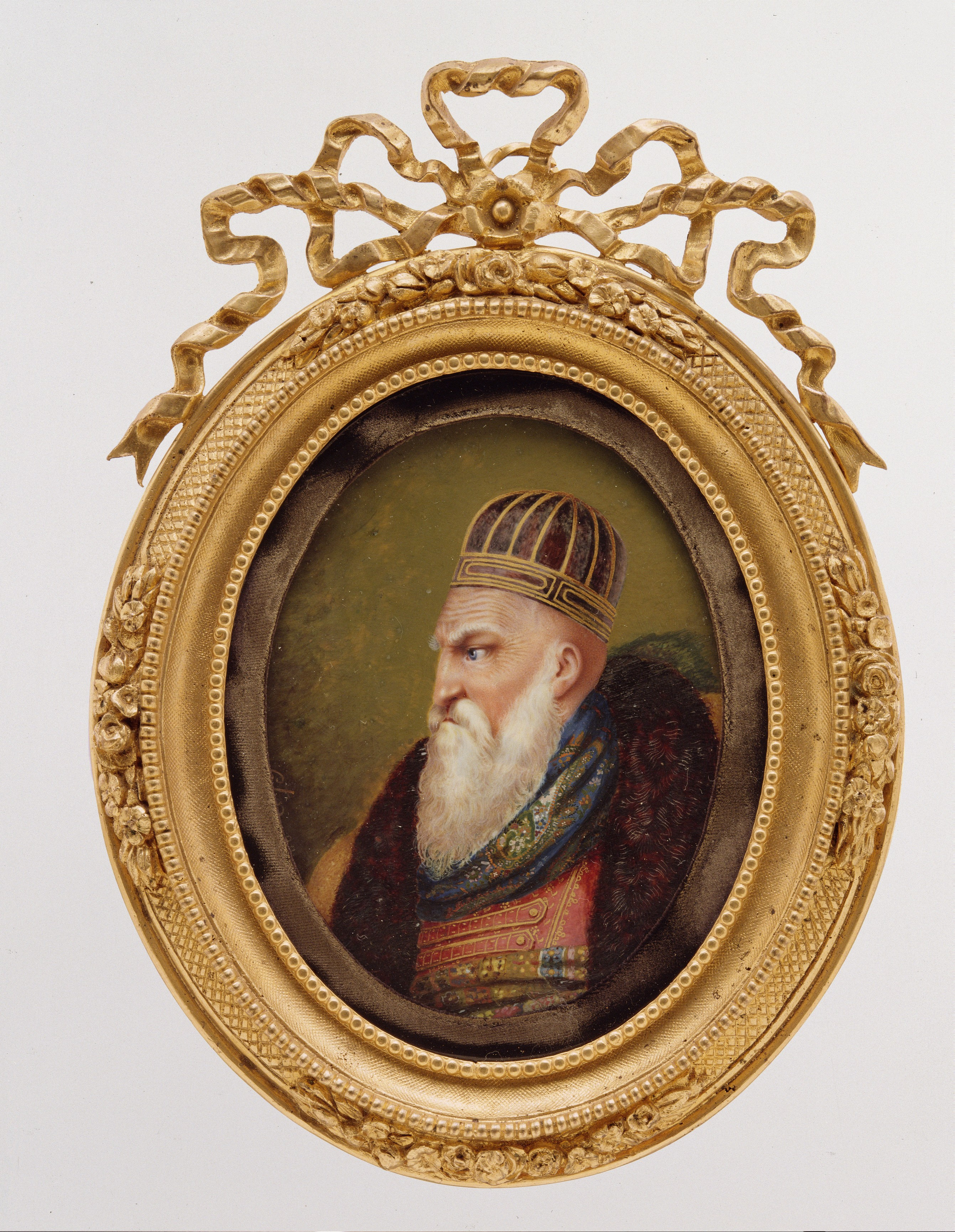
Painting of Ali Pasha by Jacob Ritter von Hartmann, 1822

After Sultan Selim III was assassinated in 1808, a period of chaos ensured in which Ali occupied Attica by force. Meanwhile, Ali sent his sons, Mukhtar and Veli, to the war on the Danubian front. When Britain and the Ottomans agreed to the Treaty of the Dardanelles in 1809, Leake gifted Ali artillery and ammunition to be used against the French, and the British Navy began to occupy the islands. This prompted the klephts to begin revolting, and Theodoros Kolokotronis allied with an Albanian chief by the name of Ali Farmaki who had quarrelled with Ali's son Veli. Kolokotronis wished to form a confederacy of Souliotes and other Albanian tribes under Hasan Çapari to overthrow Ali Pasha and his sons, and sought the aid of the French.

Napoleon sanctioned the planned rebellion, but the British arrived as funds were being collected and rebels were being recruited. Ali's rival, Ibrahim Pasha of Berat, turned to the French and gathered a coalition of Ali's enemies, including Mustafa Pasha of Delvinë, Pronio Aga of Paramythia, Hasan Çapari of Margariti, the Beys of Himara, the Aga of Konispoli and the Souliotes. This coalition began attacking Ali's realm with support from French artillery, and Ali responded by bribing Ibrahim's supporters with British support. Ali besieged Ibrahim Pasha in Berat with an 8,000-man army commanded by the Albanian captain Omer Bey Vrioni, and with the aid of British rockets, Berat finally fell after a year of skirmishing. Ibrahim retired to Vlorë, and Ali told the Porte that he had taken Berat in response to the revolts in upper Albania that were the result of Ibrahim's inability to rule.

Aware that the Sultan was not pleased with his actions, Ali did not press on with his offensive and target Vlorë. Eventually, Sultan Mahmud II was forced to acknowledge Ali's actions as the most suitable way to maintain order, and Ali quickly conquered Vlorë, stretching his dominion from Durrës in the north to Arta in the south. Ali also purchased the pitch mines between Berat and Vlorë from the Porte, which allowed him to begin exporting goods throughout the Mediterranean from Vlorë. Ali named his son Mukhtar as the new pasha of Berat, whilst the former pasha Ibrahim was imprisoned and eventually poisoned.

In 1809, Lord Byron together with John Cam Hobhouse visited Ali's court in Tepelena and Ioannina in 1809. Byron recorded the encounter in his work Childe Harold. They travelled to Albania to see the country that was, until then, mostly unknown in Britain. Byron presented Albanians as a free people who lived in their state under their leader, Ali Pasha, described by Byron as a "man of first abilities who governs the whole of Albania".

By 1811, the sanjaks of Ohrid, Elbasan, Gjirokastër and Delvinë were incorporated into Ali's territory. The city of Gjirokastër itself quickly surrendered to Ali after a show of force that included artillery, and a number of Ali's opponents were given up by the locals of Kardhiq, where Mustafa Pasha of Delvinë had sought refuge, in the false hopes that he would spare them. Mustafa Pasha, alongside the beys of Gjirokastër and Konispol, were imprisoned in Ioannina along with their followers and were eventually killed. Ali's son Selim, who was only 10 years old at the time, was installed in Gjirokastër. Simultaneously, the Ottomans expected Ali and his sons to reinforce them with tens of thousands of soldiers to aid in their war with the Russians, but Ali, likely fearing that he would be imprisoned or killed by the Ottomans, refused and cited old age and illness as an excuse.

=== Revenge on Kardhiq ===
In 1811, Kardhiq had taken in some of Ali's opponents, but Ali eventually convinced them to hand over their guests, which included Ibrahim Pasha of Berat and Mustafa Pasha of Delvina. Later, in that same year, the chieftains of Kardhiq played a prominent role in the rebellion against Ali Pasha, and the rebels managed to inflict a heavy defeat on Ali's troops in October. However, after Gjirokastër surrendered to Ali, the inhabitants of Kardhiq soon found themselves isolated and without allies. Many years prior, when Ali was just a child, the inhabitants of Kardhiq captured Ali's mother and sister, raped and then humiliated them by forcing his mother to walk through the streets with a man on her back; urged on by his sister, Ali exacted revenge on behalf of his family by marching on Kardhiq, which continued to resist him. Ali surrounded the town with an army of up to 15,000 men and began a long siege.

In December 1811, the men of Kardhiq offered to surrender on the condition that they be allowed to emigrate to Corfu; Ali refused, and the siege continued. On 21 February 1812, the village finally fell, with at least 300 defenders having been killed in the final assault. Ali personally supervised the selection of individuals - including women and children - who would either be imprisoned in Ioannina or enslaved elsewhere. On 15 March 1812, Ali rounded all of the men who he believed were connected to what happened to his family and herded these 700-800 captives into the courtyard of a large han, locking the gates and manning the surrounding walls with his men. On Ali's signal, they opened fire, and all of the captives were massacred by Ali's troops. This massacre was carried out by Thanasis Vagias, who had led the final assault on the citadel of Kardhiq. During the massacre, Ali spared the family of an imam from Kolonjë due to his friendship with the man; the family consisted of about 30 men who were allowed to continue sowing the fields until they were eventually permitted to return and repopulate the village.

Ali sent 36 prominent townspeople to Ioannina as prisoners, but they too were shot upon arrival. He also sent the hair that was harvested from the heads of the victims of Kardhiq to his sister so that she may stuff the cushions of her divan, and he proceeded to ravage and destroy nearby villages that he believed were connected to Kardhiq. Pleased by his deed, Ali installed a stone memorial at the site of the massacre warning all those who would dare to cross his family that they would suffer the same fate.

=== Acquisition of Parga ===
In 1812, as Napoleon retreated from Russia, Ali Pasha saw an opportunity to seize Parga and sent his son Mukhtar, his nephew Daut Bey, Omer Vrioni, Agos Vasiaris and 6,000 men to lay siege to the island. After negotiations failed, Ali's forces captured the outlying village of Agia, massacring and enslaving the population. Parga was then besieged by land and sea, although Daut Bey was killed during the attack and was subsequently buried in a mausoleum in full view of the castle of Parga. Ali built a fortress at Anthousa to continue his assault, but the Pargians aligned with the British for protection. On 22 March 1814, after a brief struggle, the local Pargians took control of the town on behalf of the British, causing the French garrison to retreat and a British garrison to replace them.

At the Congress of Vienna in 1815, Britain gained control of the Ionian Islands, but Parga's fate was left unresolved. Ali accused the Pargians of being a threat to the Ottoman Empire and sought the Sultan's support to gain control. In 1817, after lengthy negotiations between the British and the Ottomans, Parga was ceded to Ali in exchange for the Ottomans renouncing their claims to the Ionian Islands. As part of the agreement, the British demanded that the Ottomans pay compensation to the inhabitants who wished to leave Parga, but the Ottomans—not inclined to make the payment—offered Parga to Ali should he be willing to pay. Most of the Pargians, numbering 3,000–4,000 people, chose to emigrate to Corfu in April 1819 as Ali paid £150,000 in compensation, leaving him to take control of an empty town in May of that year. Ali's acquisition of Parga was his last triumph, but it left him ruling over a volatile region, as internal and external tensions within the empire threatened stability. In 1816, Ali married his favourite mistress, Kyra Vassiliki; she had come to Ali years beforehand when she was 12 in an attempt to plead for her father's life, and after he was granted pardon, Vassiliki was introduced into his harem and was married to Ali years later.

== Rebellion and downfall ==
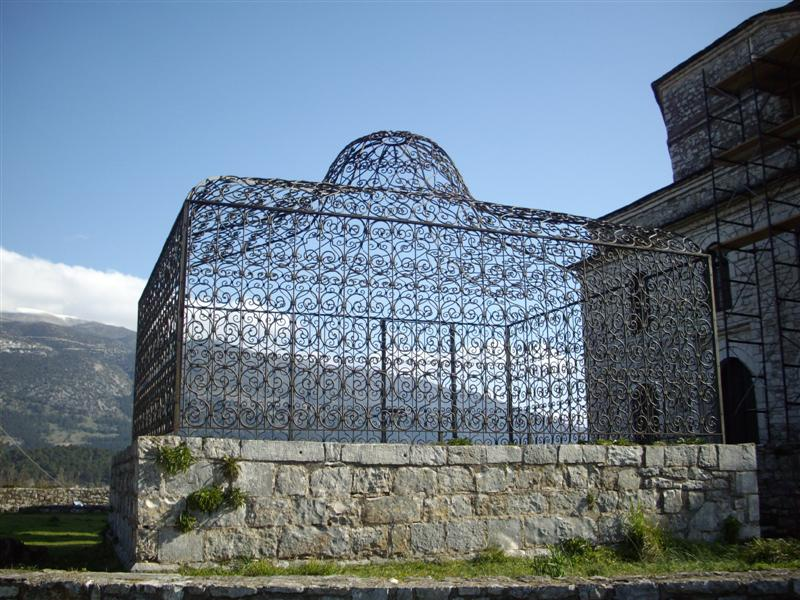
Ali Pasha's tomb in Ioannina

After the Second Serbian Uprising resulted in the formation of a semi-independent state in 1817, Ottoman minister Halet Efendi brought the attention of Sultan Mahmud II (r. 1808–1839) to Ali Pasha, whose unchecked power and growing independence posed a threat to the Sultan’s authority. Official complaints began in 1814 when Ali had been encroaching on the territory of the pasha of Salonika, from where his men had been collecting taxes since 1808 and causing issues with local agas. His actions, including the massacre at Kardhiq, worsened his standing with the Ottoman leadership. In an effort to safeguard his position, Ali attempted to secure support from various powers, including the Greeks and Russians, but his efforts appeared more desperate than strategic.

In 1820, Ali was declared an enemy of the Porte after allegations were made that he had sent assassins to kill his former ally, Ismail Pashabey, who had defected to Constantinople. Three Albanians were found and interrogated until admitting to being Ali's assassins and were subsequently executed, although this whole situation was likely staged. Nonetheless, the pashaliks of Ioannina and Delvinë were to be confiscated from Ali and given to Ismail. Ali initially attempted to deflect the situation by continuing with his bribes and warning the Sultan of the Filiki Eteria, a Greek organisation that Ali hoped to use for his own ends. This failed, and Ali looked towards the disaffected subjects of the empire for help, such as the klephts, as well as both Britain and Russia. His plans to raise an army and rebel against the empire were overly ambitious, and his overtures to the British and Russian governments failed to yield the military assistance he sought.

In July 1820, the Sultan issued an ultimatum demanding Ali present himself in Constantinople within forty days and justify his actions. Ali failed to show, and the Ottoman forces began to mobilize under Ismail Pashabey, who was to assemble a large army of troops under the pashas of Shkodër and Larissa. Ali prepared to defend himself by fortifying strategic positions in the mountains under his captains Omer Vrioni and Odysseas Androutsos, while his sons and grandsons held key territories along the coast and further inland. Ali garrisoned himself in Ioannina with 8,000 soldiers. However, as the Ottoman army advanced, Ali's allies began to waver. His sons eventually abandoned their positions, and the Ottomans, with the help of bribes and local support, captured key towns, including Berat and Preveza.

The Ottoman Army advanced from the south, joining a Turkish naval expedition from Constantinople, along with squadrons from Algeria and Egypt. The Ottoman forces gained control of the sea, defeating a Greek fleet and capturing one of Ali Pasha’s intermediaries, Spyros Kolovos, who was tortured to death. The loyalty of Ali's men increasingly wavered as the strength of their opposition became clear, and even Ali's sons ultimately abandoned their father's cause on the promises of pardons or other pashaliks from the Sultan. Mukhtar surrendered Berat whilst Gjirokastër fell to the Ottomans, resulting in the capture of Ali's third son Selim. Only Hussein Bey, Mukhtar's second son, swore to die for his grandfather and continue the resistance. The Ottomans used bribes to undermine Ali’s troops and invited the Souliotes to return from exile in Corfu and retake their homeland. With the aid of the Souliotes, the Ottomans had captured Preveza from Veli, but Ali's fort at Kiafa resisted their advances.

As the Ottomans continued to advance, Ali was visited for a second time by Colonel Charles Napier on behalf of the British, who encouraged him to spend money on fortifications and reorganise his army. Ali was initially reluctant to spend his money, but after Odysseas Androutsos retreated from Thermopylae and Omer Vrioni deserted to the Ottomans with 15,000 men, Ali made an offer of two million to Napier to help improve his defences, but it was already too late. Ali was surrounded and besieged in Ioannina by an Ottoman army of 25,000 in August 1820.

=== The beginning of the Greek War of Independence ===
The discipline in the Ottoman army deteriorated over the winter as their supplies ran low, and the troops began to ravage the countryside around Ioannina. Both sides of the conflict used Albanian mercenaries and Greeks, and their loyalty was constantly shifting. Ali's spies reported that the presence of the Souliotes within the Ottoman army was the cause of much discontent, and many agas and beys were threatening to desert the Ottoman force. When the Souliotes failed to take Kiafa on behalf of the Ottomans, they were withdrawn from the main body of troops outside of Ioannina and stationed in the most exposed positions with little support in the case of attack.

On 4 December 1820, Ali and the Souliotes formed an anti-Ottoman coalition, to which the Souliotes contributed 3,000 soldiers. Ali Pasha gained the support of the Souliotes mainly because he offered to allow the return of the Souliotes to their land, and partly by appeal to their shared Albanian origin. The Souliotes left the Turkish camp for their homeland of Souli, where Ali's commander willingly handed them the fortress of Kiafa. Initially, the coalition was successful and managed to control most of the region, but when the Muslim Albanian troops of Ali Pasha were informed of the beginning of the Greek revolts in the Morea, it was terminated.

Ismail Pashabey was replaced by the governor of the Morea, Hurshid Pasha, as commander of the Ottoman army due to his ineffectiveness. Both sides were now suffering from defections, and Hurshid became increasingly frustrated with the Albanians in his army, who wished to prolong the campaign so that they could continue receiving payment for their service. On 7 February 1821, Ali was lured into sallying out from Ioannina and suffered a severe defeat. Meanwhile, Alexandros Ypsilantis became the leader of the Filiki Eteria and decided to use the situation in Epirus as a diversion for an attempt at Greek independence. He ordered Theodoros Kolokotronis to encourage the klephts to unite with the Souliotes, and Hurshid's absence from the Morea as the commander of the besieging forces in Ioannina made the situation ripe for revolt. In February, Ypsilantis hoped to ignite a pan-Balkan revolution with Russian support by leading an army of Greeks into Wallachia, but the Ottoman Turks still feared Ali Pasha more than a potential Greek uprising and continued to place most of their focus on him.

Even though the Peloponnese was in full revolt by March 1821, the Ottomans were still more concerned about Ali Pasha, which allowed the Greeks to consolidate their uprising. The Sultan supported the policy of his grand vizier, Halet Efendi, who ignored the Greeks and instead focused on discourage Muslims—particularly Ali's Albanians—from cooperating with the klephts. In response to the revolt, Ali sent one of his trusted Greeks, Alexis Noutsos, as a representative to negotiate the establishment of an Albanian-Greek state under Ali's rule with the rebels. Noutsos, however, did not return, and instead joined the revolution under Alexandros Mavrokordatos at Missolonghi.

With the outbreak of the Greek War of Independence, Hurshid Pasha was forced to fight a war on two fronts, besieging Ali at Ioannina whilst simultaneously fighting the Greeks to the south. In September 1821, at Peta near Arta, the Greeks formed an alliance with the Souliotes and their fellow Albanian allies to help Ali on the condition that villages that were previously under his direct control were freed. This short-lived coalition with Greek revolutionary forces had effectively checked the power of the Sultan's armies and threatened Hurshid Pasha's rear. However, Alexandros Mavrokordatos, who feared that Ali might still come to an arrangement with the Ottomans, persuaded Markos Botsaris—the leader of the Souliotes—to abandon Ali's cause and instead join his brother Kostas in fighting for the Greeks who were now besieging Arta. Ali Pasha's former ally, Omer Vrioni, was sent to relieve Arta, and in an attempt to split the Greco-Albanian coalition, he informed the Albanians that Ali's time was up and that the Greeks were only fighting for their own cause. Upon discovering that the Greeks lacked arms and ammunition and were destroying mosques, the Muslim Albanians deserted the coalition and joined Omer, whilst the Souliotes went back to Souli.

The longstanding siege at Ioannina had taken its toll on Ali's supplies, prompting him to burn the town and retreat to the citadel in the north-eastern corner of Ioannina Castle in October with the remnants of his harem and a small garrison. In January, the Ottomans broke into the citadel after a winter of stalemate, where they found only 100 defenders. Ali retreated to his strongest tower and had his men place barrels of gunpowder in the basement where his treasures and powder magazine were kept should it become necessary to blow up the citadel. Ali Pasha accepted a request from the Ottomans to enter into negotiations, in which he demanded that he be allowed to see the Sultan in person. Hurshid Pasha promised to pass on his request to the Sultan and in the interim issued Ali with a safe pass signed by himself and the other pashas in the army. Hurshid Pasha also sent Ali a fake imperial firman (decree), instructing him to leave the citadel while his request for a full pardon was considered.

=== Death ===
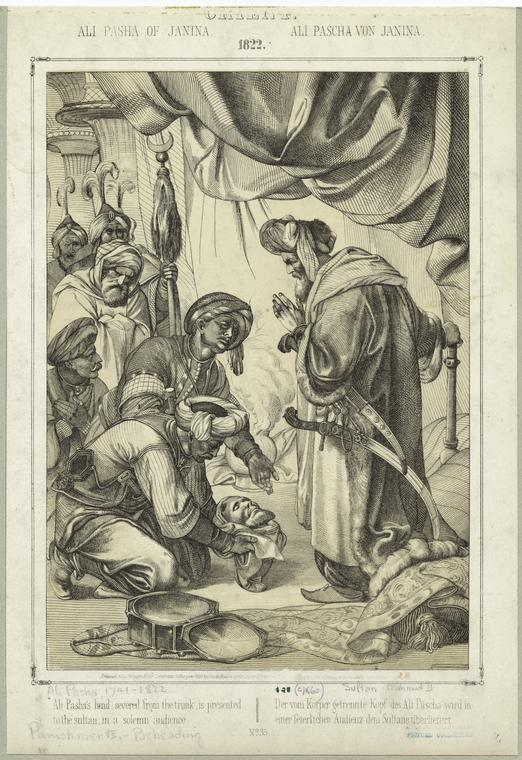
Ali Pasha's head being presented to the Ottoman Sultan Mahmud II

Despite sensing that he was being deceived, Ali agreed to a truce and left the citadel with his wife, entourage and bodyguards and settled in the Monastery of St Panteleimon on the island in Lake Pamvotis, previously taken by the Ottoman army during the siege. However, by giving up his treasures to Hurshid, Ali was no longer in any position to bargain, and whether or not Hurshid was acting under orders from the Sultan or whether he was actually awaiting the Sultan's decree is uncertain. Likewise, the circumstances surrounding Ali's death are also confusing and unclear.

A few weeks later, Ali was visited by a group of pashas and senior officials. He suspected a trap but the meeting passed without incident. In one account, a few days later on 24 January 1822, the Ottoman boats returned after which a senior official called Kiose Mehmed Pasha disembarked, claiming that he had in his possession the Sultan's firman for his execution. Ali told him to stay back until he had read the document, but the pasha ignored him and called for him to comply. Ali pulled out his pistol and fired at him, the Pasha returned fire while Kaftan Agas, Hurshid's chief of his staff, managed to wound Ali in the arm with his sword. Ali's bodyguards rushed to protect him and managed to pull him into the building. The resulting gunfight only ended when Ali was mortally wounded in the abdomen by a bullet. This caused his men to surrender. Ali was then beheaded. His last request to his chief bodyguard Thanasis Vagias was for his wife Kyra to be killed in order to prevent her falling into the hands of his enemies, but this was ignored.

In other accounts, it is believed that Hurshid sent troops to Ali on 5 February with instructions to either kill or arrest him. In the simplest version, Ali thought the troops had arrived to deliver the pardon, but when the arresting officers entered the room and demanded his head for the Sultan, Ali responded by opening fire. In the ensuing skirmish, he killed two soldiers and wounded another before being shot through the heart. In another version, it is said that after some discussion with the officer in charge, both men went out on the balcony. Ali made a low bow, and the officer stabbed him in the heart as he was off his guard. It is said that Ali either died immediately, or was still alive and crawled back into the room. The Turks, afraid to take him on, shot at him through the wooden floor and killed him. In yet another version, when the officer and his men arrived with the document, Ali realized that it was not a pardon. Both sides opened fire, and after a struggle in which he was wounded, Ali took refuge in a room upstairs before suffering a fatal blow when the soldiers fired shots up through the floorboards and wounded him in the groin. This final version, which was recorded at the monastery thirty years later, is the one most widely told today.

Whatever the cause of Ali's death, his head was posthumously cut off and shown to the remaining Albanian troops who stopped resisting only when they were promised their arrears in wages. The skin of Ali's head was peeled off for transportation in the usual manner to be stuffed with straw and moistened for presentation. Ali's head was then wrapped in a cloth, put on a silver platter and displayed through the streets and the homes of the notables of Ioannina to prove that the Ali was dead. The local archbishop was having dinner with friends when Hurshid's bodyguards forced their way into the room and deposited the head on the dinner table and demanded money. After saying a prayer for Ali, the archbishop handed over a bag of gold coins. Ali Pasha's headless corpse was buried with full honours in a mausoleum next to the Fethiye Mosque, which he shares with his first wife Emine. His head was sent to Constantinople, where it was displayed to the public on the gates of the Sultan's palace alongside the heads of his three sons and grandson who were also executed. Ali's head was buried with his deceased sons and grandson in the tombs outside the Selvyria gate in Constantinople.

== Religious activities ==
Ali Pasha was born into a Bektashi Muslim family. The struggle for power and the political turmoils within the empire required for him to support non-Muslim or heterodox priests, beliefs, and orders, and especially the Orthodox Christian population which formed the majority of the population in the region he ruled.

=== Christianity ===
Ali fostered religious activities by the local Greek population. One of the spiritual figures which influenced him was Saint Cosmas. Ali ordered and supervised the construction of a monastery dedicated to him near Berat after his death. Ali Pasha maintained control over the Christian population but respected the monasteries and stayed on good terms with the upper clergy.

=== Islam ===
He strongly supported the Sufi orders, well-spread in Rumelia at the time. Ali was close to the dominant Sufi orders as the Naqshbandi, Halveti, Sâdîyye, or even Alevi. Specifically the famous Sufi shrines in Yanina and Parga were Naqshbandi. The order that was mostly supported by him was the Bektashis and he is accepted today to have been a Bektashi follower, initiated by Baba Shemin of Fushë-Krujë. Through his patronage, Bektashism spread in Thessaly, Epirus, South Albania, and in Kruja. Ali's tomb headstone was capped by the crown (taj) of the Bektashi order. Nasibi Tahir Babai, a Bektashi saint, is regarded as one of three spiritual advisers of Ali Pasha.

== Influences ==
=== On Albanians ===
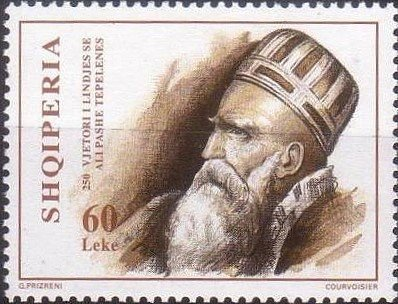
Postage stamp of Albania commemorating the 250th anniversary of Ali's birth

==== Albanian autonomy ====
Ali Pasha was among those Albanian military leaders who were at first awarded for their loyalty to the Ottoman Empire, and who however exploited the weakness of the Sublime Porte to exercise in northern and southern Albania their gathered military and political power. While they are clearly not described as champions of national fight aiming at an independent and united Albania, but regarded as political opportunists within the context of the Ottomam Empire, nevertheless these Albanian rulers established separate states by challenging the authority of the Sublime Porte, and Ali in particular also established foreign diplomatic relations with Napoleonic France and with Britain. British travellers who had met Ali Pasha noted that Ali described himself and the Albanians as friends of the British nation. Furthermore, Albanians were seen as living independently and without oppression by the Porte, meanwhile Ali Pasha was aiming to form some kind of alliance with the British government. Ali's separatist initiative, by conceiving his territory in increasingly independent terms referring to it as "Albania", eventually aiming at creating an independent Albanian–Greek state, revealed the vulnerability of Ottoman power. The Albanian rule of the Pashalik of Yanina as well as that of the Pashalik of Scutari caused the emergence of a sense of ethnic belonging among the Albanian people, which consequently led to an enduring hostility of Albanians against the Sublime Porte, also by seeking autonomy from its central power.

Ismail Qemali (1833–1919), the first head of the Albanian state, stated that in the case of Ali Pasha there was a sense of wasted opportunity: "If Ali Pasha had been less a man of his time and better endowed with political forethought, he would himself have organized this coup in time, and Albania and Greece, with the whole of Thessaly and Macedonia, might have become an independent State and a kingdom of great importance."

==== Albanian culture ====
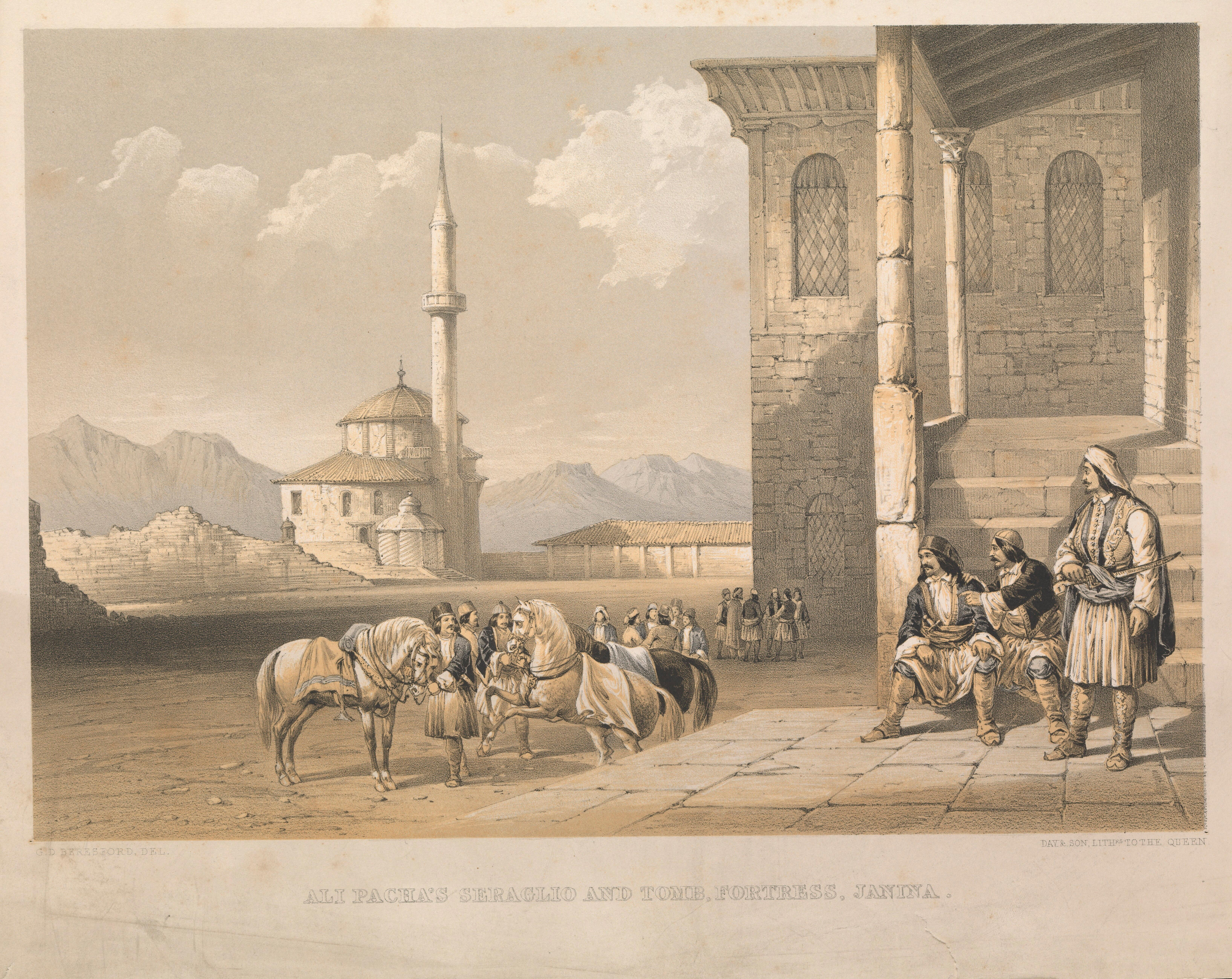
Ali Pacha's seraglio and tomb, fortress, Janina, by George de la Poer Beresford, published in 1855

Albanian urban songs were performed in the outer courtyards of the Albanian pashaliks, including that of Ali Pasha. It has been suggested that the Albanian Korçare songs emerged in Ali pasha's seraglio in Ioannina, and that they were probably composed by Muço, Ali's court musician.

According to Pouqueville, Albanian tribal forms of social organizations disappeared with the dominion of Ali Pasha, and definitely ended in 1813. In the Pashalik of Yanina, in addition to the Sharia for Muslims and Canon for Christians, Ali Pasha enforced his own laws, allowing only in rare cases the usage of local Albanian tribal customary laws. After annexing Suli and Himara into his semi-independent state in 1798, he tried to organize the judiciary in every city and province according to the principle of social equality, enforcing his laws for the entire population, Muslims and Christians. To limit blood feud killings, Ali Pasha replaced blood feuds (Alb. gjakmarrje) with other punishments such as blood payment or expulsion or the death penalty. Ali Pasha also reached an agreement with the Kurveleshi population not to trespass their territories, which at that time were larger than the area they inhabit today. Continually since the 18th century, blood feuds and their consequences in Labëria have been limited principally by the councils of elders.

==== Albanian nationalism ====
Ali Pasha has been regarded by Albanian nationalists in subsequent times as a national hero who rose against Ottoman rule. Although Ali Pasha's intent was not to build a nation state, the legacy left behind by him was utilized by the Albanian elite to construct their nationalist platform. After Ali Pasha's death the base of Albanian nationalist activities and uprisings against the Ottoman Empire became northern Albania and Kosovo.

=== On Greeks ===
==== Modern Greek Enlightenment ====
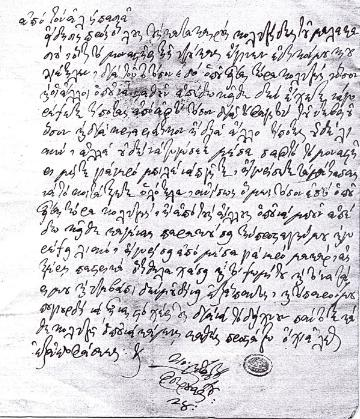
A Firman issued by Ali Pasha in 1810, written in vernacular Greek. Ali always used Greek for all his courtly dealings.

Although Ali Pasha's native language was Albanian he used Greek for all his courtly dealings, with the effect of linking, although inchoately, the ruling class with the predominantly Greek-speaking population of the territories where Ali's rule stretched. As a consequence, a part of the local Greek population showed sympathy towards his rule. This also activated new educational opportunities, with businessmen of the Greek diaspora, subsidizing a number of new educational purposes.

Ioannina, was among the Greek cities that had already embraced the Age of Enlightenment. Education in Ioannina and its schools became renowned throughout the Greek world. Those schools were operating by prestigious staff among them philologist Athanasios Psalidas, major contributor to the modern Greek Enlightenment and Georgios Sakellarios. Ioannis Kolettis served as Ali's son Muchtar personal physician and composed several scientific works. As such an academic elite emerged which also included members of Ali's court. Many of these personalities took later prominent roles in the Greek War of Independence.

==== Greek War of Independence ====
===== Revolutionary preparations and Ali Pasha =====
Ali Pasha did not sympathize with Greek rebels. He campaigned in Macedonia to exterminate the klephts and armatoles of the region in 1805, eventually managing to reduce substantially their numbers. Intense anti-Ottoman guerriglia actions arose in Macedonia during the Russo–Turkish War in 1806–1812, which caused heavy losses of Ali's Albanians against an army of armatoles and klephts at the Battle of Klinovo. The inhabitants of Parga displayed continuous support for Greek revolutionary activities and cooperated with the inhabitants of Souli against Ali Pasha. Coastal towns that were under French control, such as Parga and Preveza, were a source of increasing Greek nationalist sentiment encouraged through French interference.

In the context of the Greek War of Independence the idea of cooperation with Ali Pasha was not new among the Greeks. Leading officials of the Filiki Eteria were considering a possible conversion of Ali to Christianity and the outbreak of the revolution under his direction. Ali's policy of exlcuding Turks from all positions of authority and replacing them with Greeks and Albanians had led many Greek advisors and military leaders that consider him of becoming the head of a Greek–Albanian kingdom. However, when Ali heard of the outbreak of the Greek revolt, and sent Alexis Noutsos to propose a collaboration between Albanians and Greeks with the aim at establishing an Albanian–Greek state under the sovereignty of Ali Pasha, the Greeks refused Ali's proposal and Noutsos joined the Greek revolutionaries. Greek captains would sign in September 1821 a more limited agreement with Ali, but it was based on obvious mutual suspicion. Albanian agents advised Ali against an alliance with the Greeks because they were militarily useless. Their conclusion about the military ineffectiveness of the Greeks and klephts turned out to be true in subsequent events in the Macedonian front.

==== Revolutionary preparations in Epirus ====
The Filiki Etairia already had expanded widely in 1820 at the time when Ali Pasha was found in open conflict with the Sultan. Its leadership decided that the conditions for the outbreak of the revolution were ideal since the conflict between Ali Pasha and the Sultan caused great unrest in Epirus, west central Greece, west Macedonia and part of Thessaly. The Filiki Eteria exploited the specific conflict in order to gain the return of the Souliotes to Epirus and as a result to have Ottoman units removed from southern Greece and especially from the Peloponnese.

However, in Epirus the revolutionary outbreak was complex and difficult due to the concentration of Ottoman troops. Members of the Filiki Eteria, such as Ioannis Paparigopoulos, the Russian consul of Patras, convinced Ali that Russia would support him. The return of the exiled Souliotes to their homeland in Souli in December 1820 contributed to the creation of a revolutionary center in Epirus a fact that supported the developments for the upcoming Greek revolution in southern Greece. The collusions of Souliotes and Muslim Albanians for the defense of Ali Pasha, which led to a written agreement in January 15, and 1821 were in accordance with the positions of Alexandros Ypsilantis for the preparation of the Greek revolution. Ali Pasha's cause was supported by Souliotes because Ali promised their return to Souli, and partly by appeal to their shared Albanian origins.

===== Coordinated "Greek–Albanian" operations =====
Alexandros Ypsilantis anticipated that Ali would provide resistance against the Sultan's troops in Epirus. On January 29, 1821, Ypsilantis ordered that Greek forces should be dispatched to Epirus to join those of Ali Pasha, temporarily and ostensibly, until they managed to defeat the Ottomans there. In late March-early April 1821 Christoforos Perraivos under order by Ypsilantis urged the Souliotes to maintain their alliance with Ali Pasha, but to ignore the military priorities of the latter and concentrate to armed operations that would facilitate the spread of the revolutionary movement in Epirus. Perraivos also emphasized only to the prominent Souliots the objectives of the nation due to risk of being leaked to the Muslim Albanians since that would make the later to abandon any agreement.

A failure in the sector of Tzoumerka thwarted the plans of the Greek revolutionaries and Ali, however their operational capabilities in the area had not been diminished. The revolutionaries of the area of Arta under Gogos Bakolas resisted the Ottoman advance at Peta on 15 July. Communication between the Souliote units with troops loyal to Ali Pasha as well as revolutionary leaders from Arta and Acarnania continued. Their alliance was ratified on 1 September 1821. Alexios Noutsos played a key role in this developments while the Greek revolutionary authorities of Acarnania, Aetolia and Morea agreed despite the distrust towards Ali Pasha. In the beginning of September, the regional alliance reached its climax, involving Muslim Albanian beys, Souliote chieftains and Greek armatoles, who pledged to defend Ali Pasha's rebellion against the Ottoman army. Greek singnatories evidently had not real intention to fight for Ali Pasha's cause, they rather agreed merely to exploit the opportunity this alliance offered them.

The immediate objective of the alliance was the capture of Arta, which was at that time under Ottoman control. Roughly four thousand armed men gathered to besiege Arta. The city was attacked by both Muslims and Christians, Albanians and Greeks who had united their forces to pillage the city, where an indiscriminate looting of churches, mosques, shops and stores was perpetrated. The lootings during the siege Arta were especially perpetrated by groups of Souliotes and Acarnanians. Ottoman troops did not intervene because they knew they were not the target. During this event some of the Greek bands plundered the homes of Christians and stole their possessions, even torturing people in boiling oil in order to extort information regarding the hiding places of their valuable belongings.

At the beginning of December 1821, the allied forces managed to capture a greater part of the city, however, instead of concentrating on the fall of the garrison they turned into widespread looting and the siege was weakened and finally ceased.

==== Termination of common operations ====
Around the same time, during the Ottoman siege of Ali Pasha's forces in Ioannina, Muslim Albanian leaders were being informed about events in the Morea, which led them to start doubting about the allegiance of their Greeks allies. Indeed, visiting Mesolonghi in October to see the Greek actions, Tahir Abaxhi, a Muslim Albanian warlord and especially trusted man of Ali Pasha formerly serving as chief of Ali's police troops, noticed that many Greeks were no longer fighting for Ali's cause, as after Mesolonghi had declared for the revolution, the remaining Muslims were massacred, expelled, or enslaved. The local Greek armatole Dimitrios Makris had even ordered mass killing. Mosques were razed to the ground and desecrated, and Muslim gils were forcibly baptized. The disprespect of the alliance by the Greeks became even more clear when Elmaz Bey informed Abaxhi that on their way home from Tripolitsa, they found out that Greeks have strangled some of his soldiers. Hence, after all the evidence, Muslim Albanian leaders eventually broke with Christian Souliotes.

Abaxhi and other Muslim Albanian military personalities that had been previously loyal to Ali Pasha approached the Ottoman commander, Khursid Pasha, asking for and receiving his pardon, promising to support him to kill Ali Pasha and drive out the Greek revolutionaries. This so-called Greek-Albanian alliance was finally dissolved and the Muslim allies of Ali Pasha as well as the warlords (oplarhichoi) of Acarnania switched sides and came to the Sultan's camp. As a consequence, Ali Pasha's resistance had been broken and the fortress of Ioannina was captured easily in December 1821.

==== Greek nationalism ====
Ali's separatist initiative, by conceiving his territory in increasingly independent terms referring to it as "Albania", and eventually aiming at creating an independent Albanian-Greek state, reveal the vulnerability of Ottoman power and had direct effect on the development of Greek nationalism. Though his subject population was by vast majority Greek and noted for their nationalist sentiment there is little evidence that Ali conceived of his desire for independence in such terms. However, he believed that he could make use of the local Greek national sentiment to strengthen his own power and separatist tendencies.

== Legacy ==
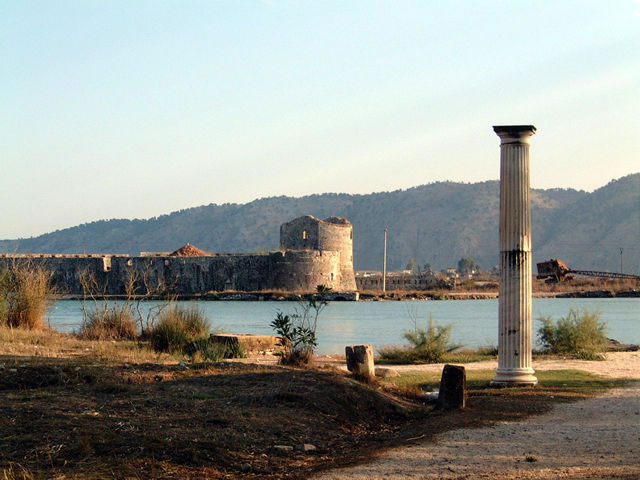
Ali Pasha Castle in Butrint, Albania

Albania's rich archaeological heritage has been systematically explored since Ali's rule in the early 19th century. The excavations were conducted in order to find treasures for Ali's personal collection. Systematic investigations of the archaeological sites and monuments of the region have been undertaken by French consul-general François Pouqueville and British diplomat William Martin Leake, who were both introduced in Ali's court.

Pouqoueville's Histoire included a lengthy account of Ali Pasha, based on personal acquaintance and multiple conversations with Ali and several other personalities associated with him. Pouqueville in this work pointed out that Ali's rule and rebellion against the Porte was a vital precondition for the Greek Revolution. While in no way a Greek Nationalist himself, Ali's rule greatly weakened Ottoman control of Greece, and his death created a vacuum which was promptly filled by the Greek revolutionaries.

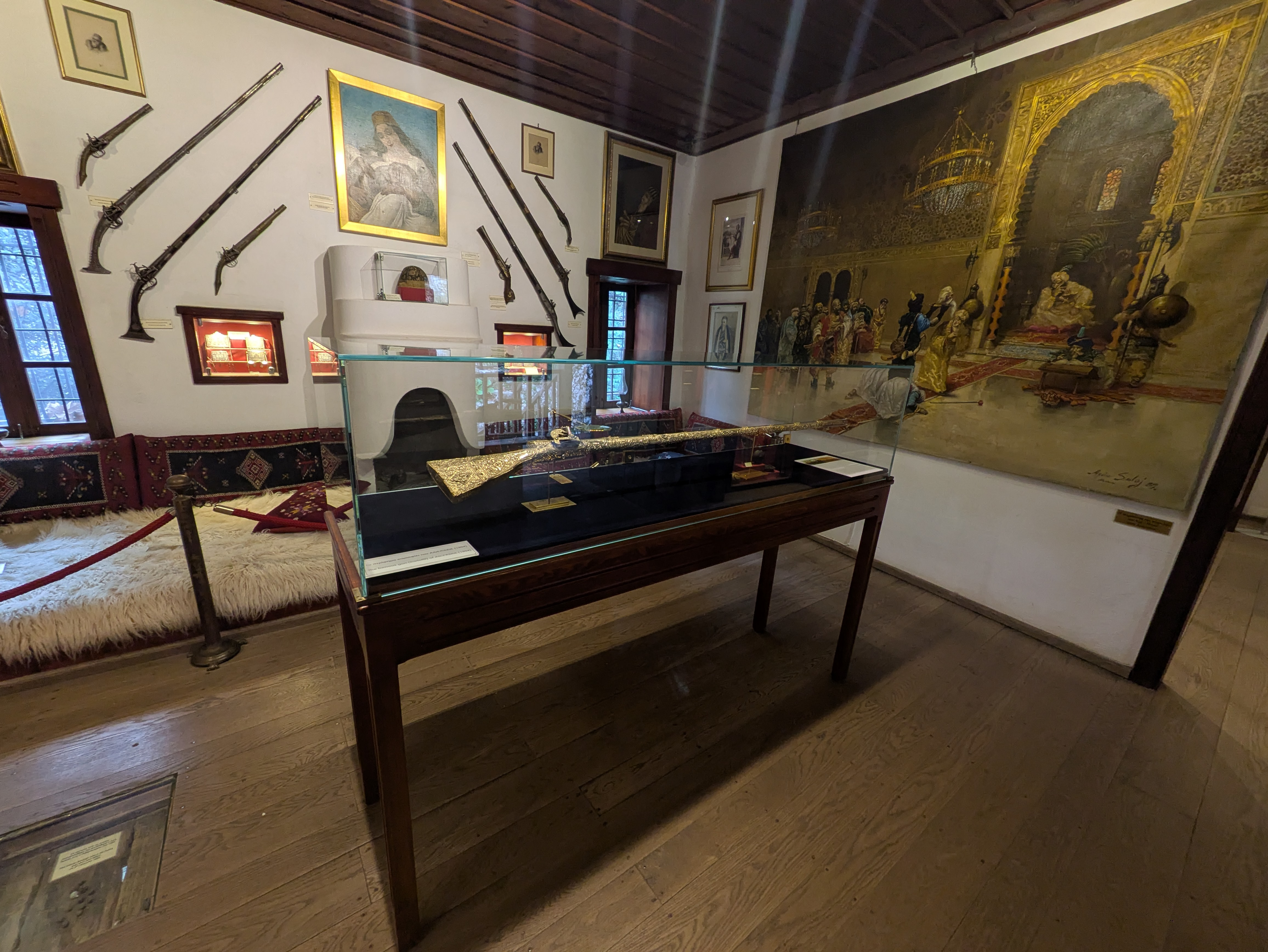
Interior photo of the Ali Pasha Museum on Ioannina island featuring weapons displays.

The former Monastery of Saint Pantaleon in which Ali Pasha was killed is today the Museum of Ali Pasha and Revolutionary Period, a popular tourist attraction. The holes made by the bullets can still be seen, and the monastery has dedicated to him a museum, which includes a number of his personal possessions.

A legend of Ali Pasha's supposed hidden treasure remained unresolved.

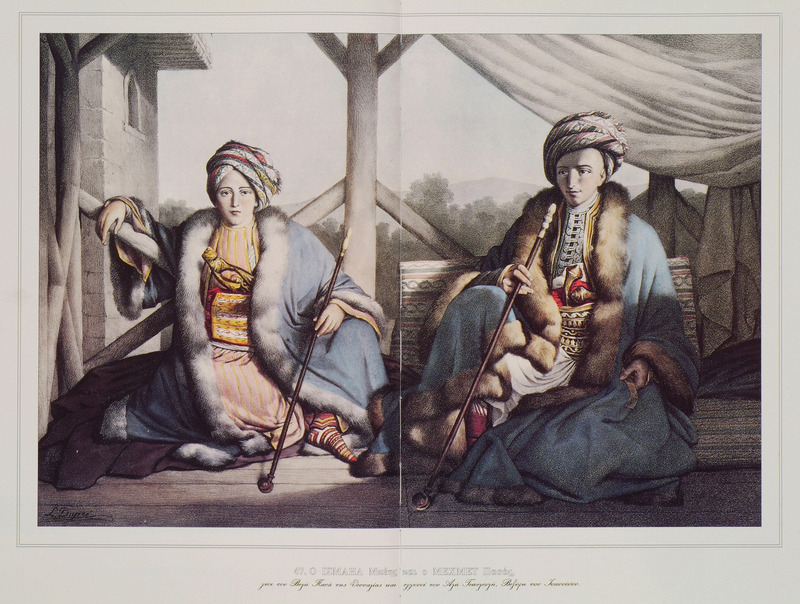
Ismail Bey and Mehmed Pasha, the sons of Veli Pasha and grandsons of Ali Pasha, by Louis Dupré (1827)

All three of Ali's sons were killed during his downfall but most of his grandchildren were not persecuted by the Ottoman state as they were too young at that time. His grandson Tepedelenlizade Ismail Rahmi Pasha (son of Veli Pasha and Zempide, daughter of Ibrahim Pasha Vlora) had a long career in the Ottoman administration and held twice the governorship of the areas which were ruled by Ali Pasha. He was made governor of the Janina vilayet in 1850 and governor of the Thessaly Eyalet in 1864. He also was Mutasarrif of Prizren (1868–1869) and for a brief period governor of Crete. As governor of the vilayet of Thessalia, Ismail Rahmi granted an important administrative position to his young nephew from his maternal line – Ismail Kemal Bey Vlora – who later became the founder of modern Albania.

== Ali Pasha in literature ==
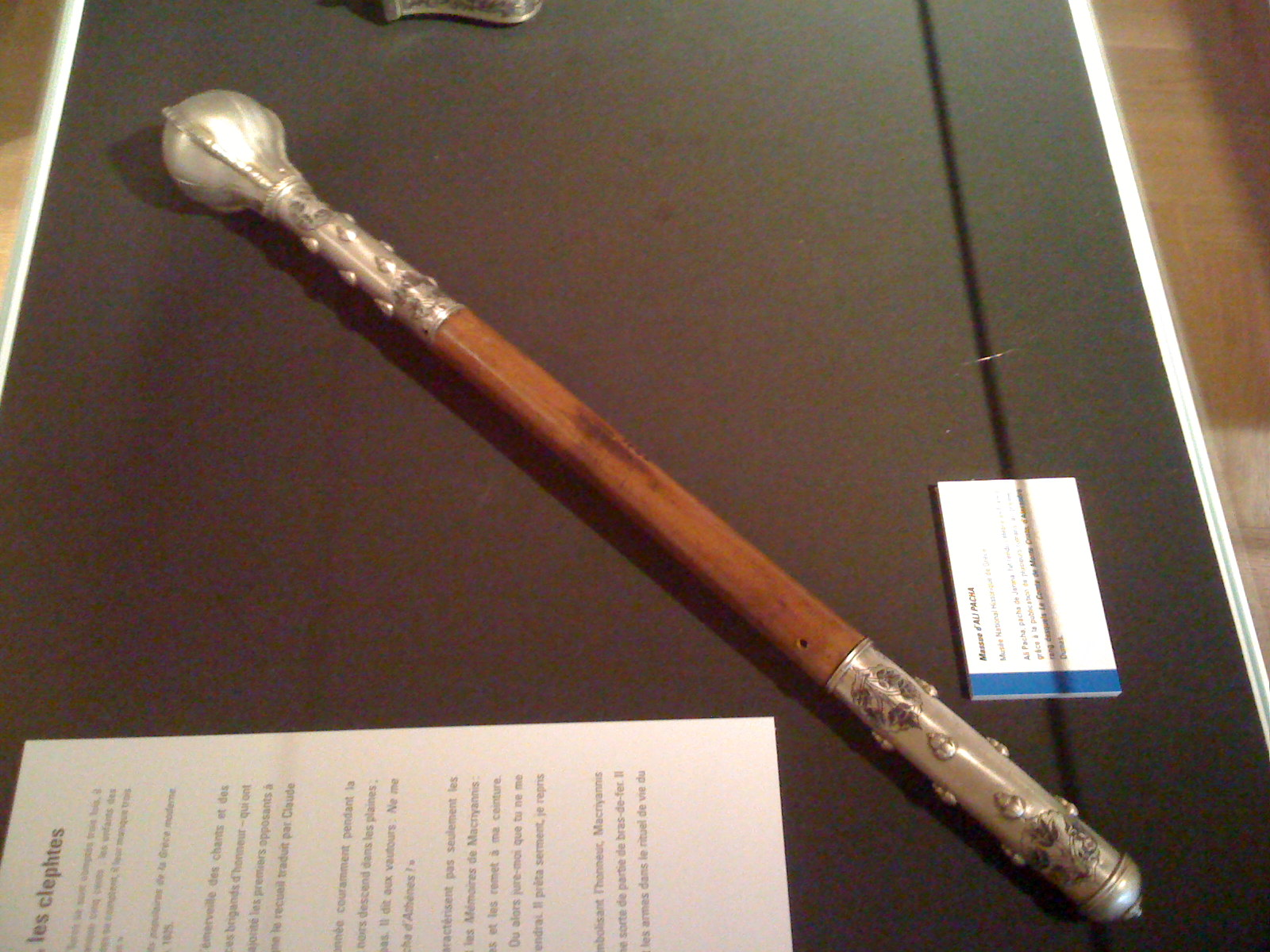
Ali Pasha's mace, now at the National Historical Museum of Athens

- According to the Encyclopedia of Islam, in Western literature, Ali Pasha became the personification of an "oriental despot".
- In the early 19th century, Ali's personal balladeer, Haxhi Shekreti, composed the poem Alipashiad. The poem was written in Greek language, since the author considered it a more prestigious language in which to praise his master. Alipashiad bears the unusual feature of being written from the Muslim point of view of that time. It stretches to 15,000 15-syllable lines was written by his personal balladeer.
- Ali is the title character of the 1828 German singspiel Ali Pascha von Janina by Albert Lortzing.
- Ali Pasha's deeds have inspired numerous Greek poems and plays where he is primarily portrayed as cruel tyrant. Events like the sacking and drowning of women – including Euphrosyne Vasileiou – by Ali's orders in Ioannina became the main theme of poet Aristotelis Valaoritis. The poem The drowning of Frosyne Nikolaos Mavrommatis (1770–1817) was also dedicated to the same theme, as well as the theatrical play Eufrosyne (1876). Other works describe the scorched earth policy Ali undertook in Ioannina and the burning of the city.
- In the novel The Count of Monte Cristo by Alexandre Dumas, père, Ali Pasha's downfall is revealed to have been brought about by French Army Officer Fernand Mondego, who was made bearer of the false pardon in a dramatized retelling of the attack on the Monastery of St. Panteleimon. Ali Pasha's wife, Kyra Vassiliki, and daughter, Haydée, were awarded to Mondego for his part in the attack, who sells them into slavery to form the foundation of his wealth. The novel's protagonist, Edmond Dantès, subsequently locates Haydée, buys her freedom, and helps her avenge her parents by orchestrating and allowing her to testify at Mondego's court martial in Paris. Mondego, who is thereby found guilty of "felony, treason, and dishonor", is abandoned by his wife and son and later commits suicide. Having found peace, Dantès departs for the East to begin a new life with Haydée, who has declared her love for him.
- Alexandre Dumas, père wrote a history, Ali Pacha, part of his eight-volume series Celebrated Crimes (1839–40).
- Ali Pasha is also a major character in the 1854 Mór Jókai's Hungarian novel Janicsárok végnapjai ("The Last Days of the Janissaries"), translated into English by R. Nisbet Bain, 1897, under the title The Lion of Janina.
- Ali Pasha and Hursid Pasha are the main characters in Ismail Kadare's historic novel The Traitor's Niche (original title Kamarja e turpit).
- Ali Pasha provokes the bey Mustapha (a fictional character) in Patrick O'Brian's 1981 The Ionian Mission to come out fighting on his own account, when the British navy is in the area seeking an ally to push the French off Corfu. The Turkish expert for the British Navy visits him to learn this tangled story, which puts Captain Aubrey out to sea to take Mustapha in battle.
- Many of the conflicting versions about the origin of the "Spoonmaker's Diamond", a major treasure of the Topkapi Palace in Istanbul, link it with Ali Pasha – though their historical authenticity is doubtful.
- Loretta Chase's 1992 historical romance novel The Lion's Daughter includes Ali Pasha and a possible revolt against him by a cousin, Ismal.
- The best selling graphic novel Sons of Chaos, written by Chris Jaymes, is about Ali Pasha and his relationship with the Suliotes.

== See also ==
- Albania under the Ottoman Empire
- Dimitrios Deligeorgis, a secretary to Ali Pasha
- Greek War of Independence
- History of Albania
- History of Ottoman Albania

== Sources ==
- Anemodoura, Maria (2020). "Πολιτικές και οικονομικές δομές στην επικράτεια του Αλή πασά Τεπεντελενλή. Από τον "Ανατολικό Δεσποτισμό" έως τη νεωτερικότητα". Pergamos – Library and Information Center of National and Kapodistrian University of Athens.
- Aravantinos, S. (1979) [1895]. Istoria Ali Pasa tou Tepelenli [the history of Ali Pasha Tepelenli based on the unpublished texts by Panagiotis Arantinos] (photographic reprint ed.). Athens.
- Brisku, Adrian (2013). Bittersweet Europe: Albanian and Georgian Discourses on Europe, 1878–2008. Berghahn Books. ISBN 978-0-85745-985-5.
- Clayer, Nathalie (2014). "Ali Paşa Tepedelenli". In Fleet, Kate; Krämer, Gudrun; Matringe, Denis; Nawas, John; Rowson, Everett (eds.). Encyclopaedia of Islam (3rd ed.). Brill Online. doi:10.1163/1573-3912_ei3_COM_23950. ISSN 1873-9830.
- Dauti, Daut (January 30, 2018). Britain, the Albanian Question and the Demise of the Ottoman Empire 1876–1914 (phd). University of Leeds.
- Dauti, Daut (2023). Britain, the Albanian National Question and the Fall of the Ottoman Empire, 1876-1914. Bloomsbury Publishing. ISBN 9781350349544.
- Fleming, Katherine Elizabeth (1999). The Muslim Bonaparte: diplomacy and orientalism in Ali Pasha's Greece. Princeton University Press. ISBN 978-0-691-00194-4.
- Fleming, K. E. (2014). The Muslim Bonaparte: Diplomacy and Orientalism in Ali Pasha's Greece. Princeton University Press. ISBN 978-1-4008-6497-3.
- Howard, Douglas A. (2017). A History of the Ottoman Empire. Cambridge University Press. ISBN 9781108107471.
- Kitromilides, Paschalis M. (March 25, 2021). The Greek Revolution: A Critical Dictionary. Harvard University Press. ISBN 978-0-674-98743-2.
- Koço, Eno (2018). Traditional Songs and Music of the Korçë Region of Albania. Cambridge Scholars Publishing. ISBN 9781527510401.
- Koliopoulos, John S. (1987). Brigands with a Cause, Brigandage and Irredentism in Modern Greece 1821–1912. Oxford: Clarendon Press. ISBN 0-19-822863-5.
- Lampridis, I. (1993) [1888]. "Malakasiaka". Epirotika Meletimata [Epirote Studies]. 5. Ioannina: 2. Society for Epirote Studies. (EHM): 25.
- Lars, Gr. (1994). I Albania kai I Epiros sta teli tou IG' kai stis arches tou IH' aion. Ta Dytikovalkanika Pasalikia tis Othomanikis Autokratorias [Albania and Epirus I the late 18th and early 19th centuries, the Ottoman Eyalets of Western Balkans]. Translated by Dialla, A. Athens: Gutenberg. pp. 144–173.
- Leake, W. M. (1967). Travels in northern Greece (photographic reprint ed.). Amsterdam: Α.Μ.Ηakkert. pp. Vol. 1, pp. 295, Vol. 4, pp. 260.
- Malcolm, Noel (2020). Rebels, believers, survivors: studies in the history of the Albanians (1st ed.). Oxford (GB): Oxford University Press. ISBN 9780198857297.
- Mangalakova, Tanya (2004). "The Kanun in Present-Day Albania, Kosovo, and Montenegro". International Centre for Minority Studies and Intercultural Relations. Sofia.
- Mazower, Mark (2021). The Greek Revolution: 1821 and the Making of Modern Europe (Hardback). Allen Lane. ISBN 978-0-241-00410-4.
- Papageorgiou, Stefanos P. (2014). "The attitude of the Beys of the Albanian Southern Provinces (Toskaria) towards Ali Pasha Tepedelenli and the Sublime Porte (mid-18th-mid-19th centuries)". Cahiers balkaniques. 42. doi:10.4000/ceb.3520.
- Palairet, Michael (2016). Macedonia: A Voyage through History: From the Fifteenth Century to the Present. Vol. 2. Cambridge Scholars Publishing. ISBN 9781443888493.
- Papastavros, A. (2013). Ali Pasas, apo listarchos igemonas [Ali Pasha, from bandit to leader]. Apeirotan.
- Pappas, Nicholas Charles (1982). Greeks in Russian Military Service in the Late Eighteenth and Early Nineteenth Centuries. Stanford University.
- Phillips, Walter Alison (1911). "Ali Pasha" . In Chisholm, Hugh (ed.). Encyclopædia Britannica. Vol. 1 (11th ed.). Cambridge University Press. pp. 659–661.
- Plataris, G. (1982). Kodikas Choras Metsovou ton eton 1708–1907 [Chora Metsovou Log of the years 1708–1907]. Athens. pp. 105, 120.
- Psimouli, Vaso D. (1998). Souli kai Souliotes. Athens.
- Psimuli, Vaso Dh. (2016). Suli dhe suljotët [Souli and the Souliots]. Toena. ISBN 9789928205728.
- Roudometof, Victor; Robertson, Roland (2001), Nationalism, globalization, and orthodoxy: the social origins of ethnic conflict in the Balkans, Greenwood Publishing Group, ISBN 978-0-313-31949-5
- Russell, Quentin; Russell, Eugenia (September 30, 2017). Ali Pasha, Lion of Ioannina: The Remarkable Life of the Balkan Napoleon. Pen and Sword. ISBN 978-1-4738-7722-1.
- Sakellariou, M. V. (1997). Epirus: 4000 Years of Greek History and Civilization. Ekdotike Athenon. ISBN 960-213-371-6.
- Skafidas, V. (1962). "Istoria tou Metsovou" [History of Metsovo]. Epirotiki Estia. 11/121, 122: 387.
- Siorokas, G. (1999). I eksoteriki politiki tou Ali pasa ton Ioanninon. Apo to Tilsit sti Vienni [the internal affairs policy of Ali Pasha. From Tilsit to Vienna (1807–1815)]. Ioannina.
- Skiotis, Dennis (1976). "The Greek Revolution: Ali Pasha's Last Gamble" (PDF). Hellenism and the First Greek War of Liberation (1821–1830): Continuity and Change. University of York, Faculty of Liberal Arts & Professional Studies: 97–109. Archived from the original (PDF) on November 17, 2015.
- Skiotis, Dennis N. (July 1971). "From Bandit to Pasha: first steps in the rise to power of Ali of Tepelen, 1750–1784". International Journal of Middle East Studies. 2 (3): 219–244. doi:10.1017/S0020743800001112. JSTOR 162196. S2CID 159559591.
- Skoulidas, Ilias (2001). "Relations between Greeks and Albanians(1875–1897)". Didaktorika.gr (in Greek). Πανεπιστήμιο Ιωαννίνων. Σχολή Φιλοσοφική. Τμήμα Ιστορίας και Αρχαιολογίας. Τομέας Ιστορίας Νεώτερων χρόνων. doi:10.12681/eadd/12856.
- Stubbs, John H.; Makaš, Emily G. (2011). Architectural Conservation in Europe and the Americas. John Wiley and Sons. ISBN 9780470901113.
- Smyris, Georgios (January 1, 2000). "The Fortification Network of the Pashalik of Ioannina: 1788–1822". National Technical University of Athens (in Greek). Εθνικό Μετσόβιο Πολυτεχνείο (ΕΜΠ). Σχολή Αρχιτεκτόνων Μηχανικών. doi:10.12681/eadd/12426. hdl:10442/hedi/12426.
- Tanner, Marcus (2014). Albania's mountain queen: Edith Durham and the Balkans. London: I.B.Tauris. ISBN 9781780768199.
- Tritos, M. (1993). Ta sozomena firmania ton pronomion tou Metsovou [The surviving firmans about the privileges granted to Metsovo]. Minutes of the 1st Conference of Metsovite Studies. Athens. p. 404.
- Ushtelenca, Ilir (2009). Shteti dhe qeverisja e Ali Pashë Tepelenës [State and Government of Ali Pasha of Tepelena] (in Albanian). Ada. ISBN 9789994358595.
- Valentini, Giuseppe (1956). Il diritto delle comunità nella tradizione giuridica albanese; generalità. Vallecchi.
- Winnifrith, Tom (1987). The Vlachs: The History of a Balkan People. Duckworth. ISBN 978-0-7156-2135-6.
- Worringer, Renée (2021). A Short History of the Ottoman Empire. University of Toronto Press. ISBN 9781442600430.
- Yaycioglu, Ali (2016). Partners of the Empire: The Crisis of the Ottoman Order in the Age of Revolutions. Stanford University Press. ISBN 978-0-8047-9612-5.
- Zotos, Dim. A. (1938). I dikaiosyni eis to kratos tou Ali pasa [Justice in the state of Ali Pasha]. Athens.

=== Ali Pasha archives ===
- Ali Pasha Archives, 2007, I. Chotzi collection, Gennadius Library, Ed. – Cpmmentary – Index: V. Panagiotopoulos with collaboration of D. Dimitropoulou, P. Michailari, Vol. 4
- Ali Pasha Archives, I. Chotzi collection, Gennadius Library, Ed. – Commentary – Index: V. Panagiotopoulos with the collaboration of D. Dimitropoulou, P. Michailari, 2007, Vol. B’, pp. 672–674 (doc. 851), 676–677, (doc. 855), 806–807 (doc. 943).
