= Tzavellas =

Tzavellas or Tzavella is a surname. Notable people with the surname include:

== Tzavella ==
- Athina Tzavella (born 1988), Greek swimmer
- Moscho Tzavela (also known as Moscho Tzavella; c. 1760–1803), Greek heroine

== Tzavellas ==
- Fotos Tzavelas (also known as Fotos Tzavellas; c. 1770–1809), Souliot clan leader and fighter
- George Tzavellas (1916–1976), Greek film director
- Georgios Tzavellas (born 1987), Greek footballer
- Kitsos Tzavellas (1800–1855), Souliot fighter, general, politician, prime minister of Greece (1847)
