= Souliote War (1789–1793) =

1789–1793 Ottoman revolt

- Part of the Russo-Turkish War (1787–1792)
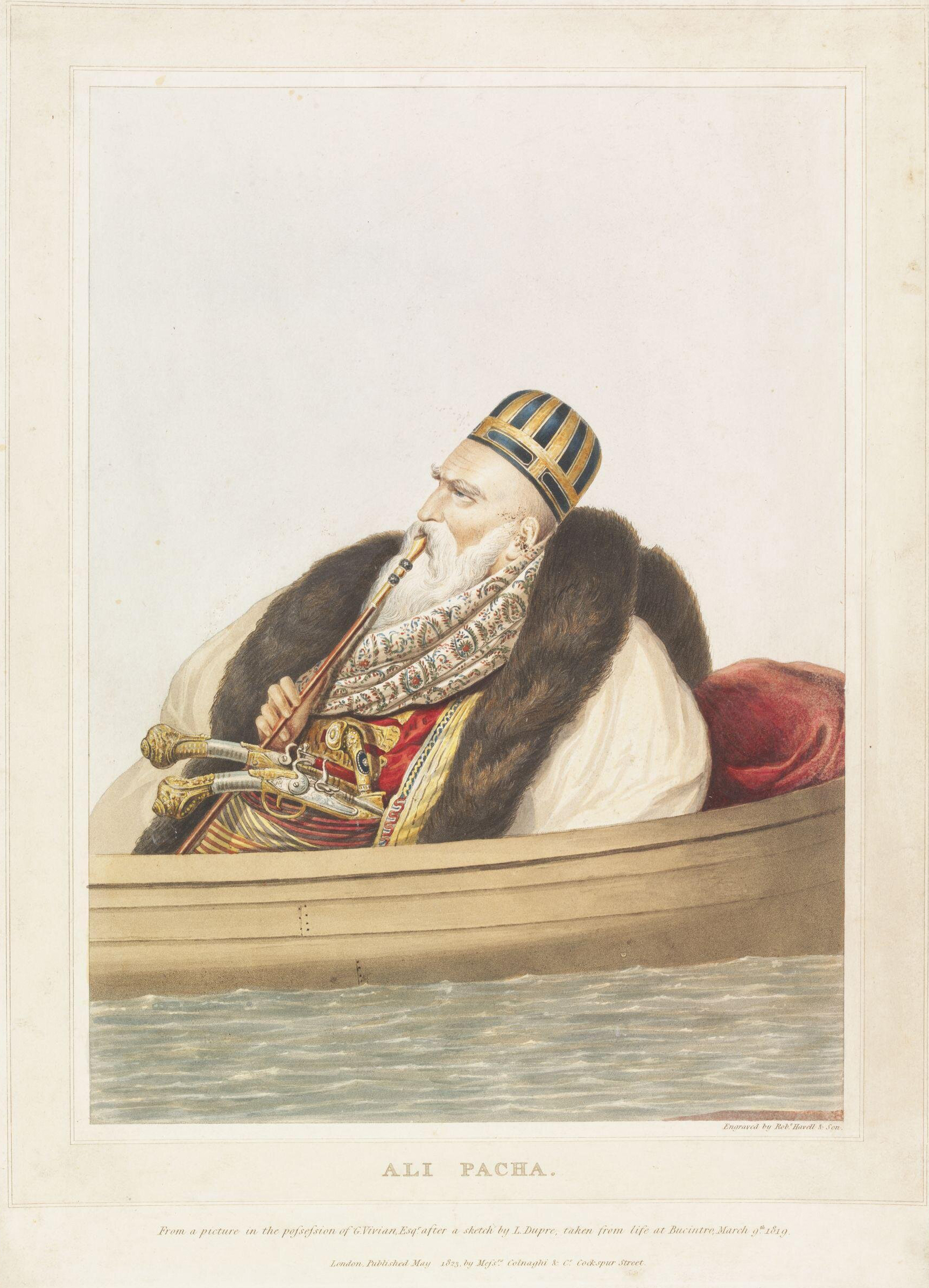
- Ali Pasha
Date	February 1789 – April 1793
Location	Souliot Confederation; Pashalik of Yanina
Result	Souliote victory

Belligerents
Souliotes; Ibrahim Pasha of Vlorë; Mustafa Pasha of Delvinë; Cham aghas Gjirokastër beys	Pashalik of Yanina

Commanders and leaders
Georgios Botsaris; Lambros Tzavelas; Ibrahim Pasha of Vlorë; Mustafa Pasha of Delvinë	Ali Pasha of Ioannina

Strength
Unknown	10,000–20,000

The 1789–1793 Souliote War was an armed conflict between Ali Pasha of Ioannina and a coalition of Souliotes and their Muslim allies. The war lasted between February 1789 and April 1793 and was fought in the context of the Russo-Turkish War (1787–1792) and local power struggles. The Souliotes achieved a defensive victory but their actions did not foment a Christian insurrection as the Russians had hoped.

== Background ==
With the outbreak of the Russo-Turkish War in August 1787, Russian Empress Catherine the Great laid out her plans to incite revolts across Ottoman Greece. Proclamations calling the Greek clergy to lead a war of liberation against the Ottomans were printed in September 1787 and February 1788. In March, Admiral Samuel Greig and Major-General Ivan Zaborovsky were tasked with signing alliances and facilitating revolts among the Christian populations in Dalmatia, Albania and Greece. The Russian consulate in the Heptanese activated its network of sleeper agents who had originally been recruited before the Orlov revolt. Louitzis Sotiris and Himariot Pano Bixhili begun recruiting soldiers in the area of Epirus, while Antonis Psaros and Lambros Katsonis built a small naval force in Italy. For the most part Russian plans did not materialize as the Baltic Fleet failed to reach the Mediterranean Sea. Without its assistance most of Russia's local allies refused to take part in the rising.

In March 1788, Sotiris reached Preveza where he delivered Russian proclamations to the chieftains of the Souliotes. He recruited numerous persons to man Katsonis' fleet destined for the Aegean Sea. He also managed to convince the Souliotes to swear an oath of allegiance to Catherine in September in return for patents granting them military ranks in the Russian army. On 3 March 1790, the leaders of the greatest Souliote clans reconfirmed their oath in written form, promising to fight against the Muslims of Rumelia. In May 1788, Ali the newly appointed Pasha of Ioannina received orders to head north to assist the Sublime Porte in its war against the Austrians. When Ali was informed by Lassalle, the French consul in Preveza, of the upcoming Souliote revolt, he launched a recruitment drive in Ioannina in order to defend the Pashalik of Yanina.

== Conflict ==
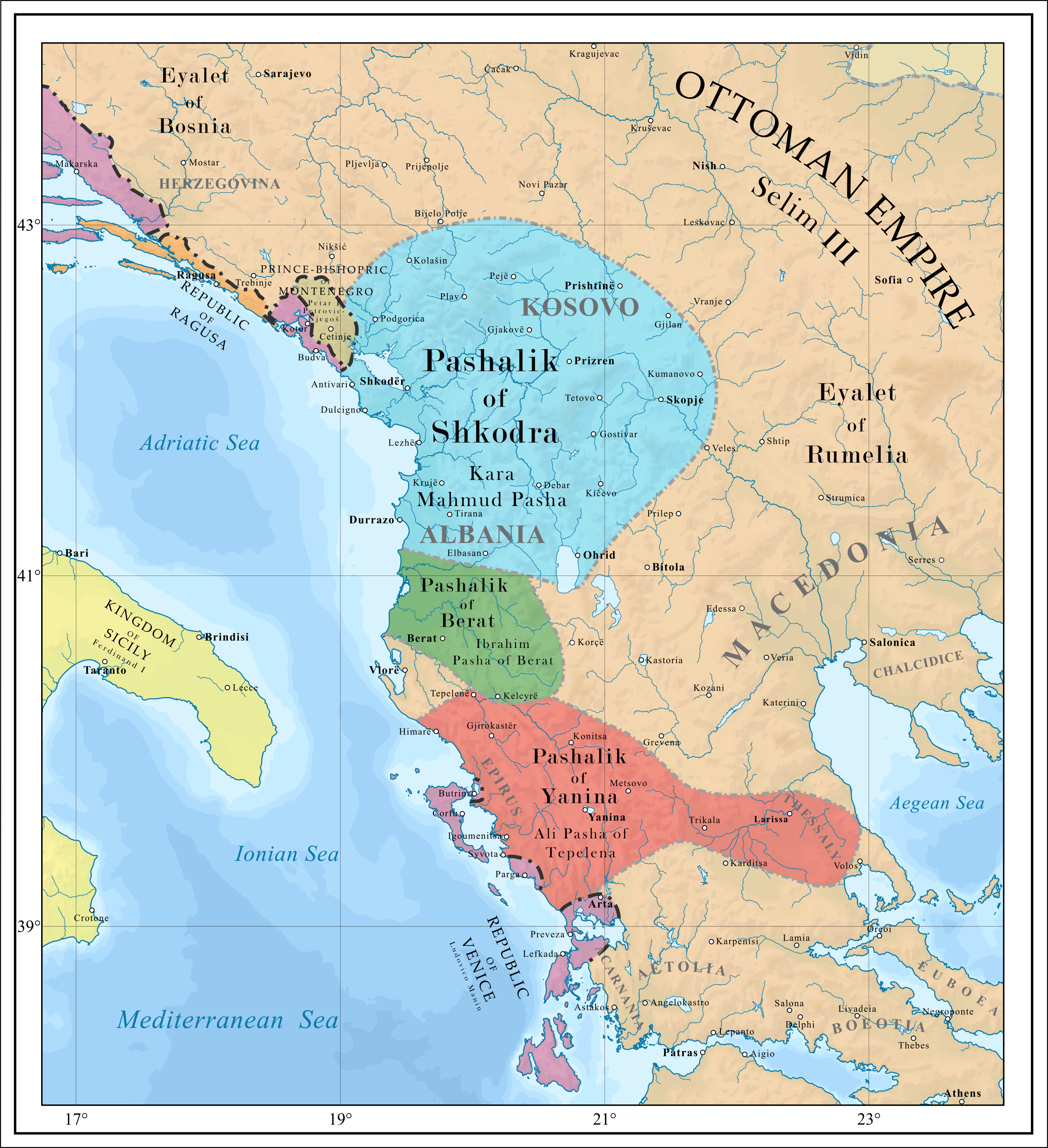
The Pashalik of Yanina in 1790-1795 (in red) as part of the Ottoman Empire.

Hostilities began in February 1789, when Ali Pasha's men attacked a group of Souliotes in Louro and stole their cattle. The Souliotes responded by launching an offensive from the Lakka village and killed any Muslim they encountered. Ali Pasha dispatched an army of 3,000 Muslim Albanians to pursue the Souliotes back into their mountain strongholds. Hoping to divide Ali's lands between themselves, Ibrahim Pasha of Vlorë, Mustapha Pasha of Delvinë, Cham Aghas and the Beys of Gjirokastër secretly aided the Souliotes and opened a new front against him in Korçë. The Souliotes thus found themselves temporarily allied with their erstwhile enemies. In May, Ali Pasha received a firman from the Ottoman sultan, supporting his war against Souli. Ali Pasha captured Souliote lands lying beyond mount Tomaros, however he offered them peace on favorable terms to focus his attention on their allies. Negotiations were initiated with the mediation of the Metropolitan of Ioannina. Having suffered heavy casualties and seeing that Russian aid had yet to arrive, the Souliotes signed the peace agreement in June. The treaty resulted in their appointment as armatoloi. The leaders of Souliotes gave Ali Pasha five of their children as hostages, in accordance to their traditional law. A small minority of Souliotes that were not included in the treaty continued their armed struggle, robbing and massacring civilians regardless of their religious affiliation as far as Makrynoros and Pindus. Ali Pasha defeated Mustapha Pasha and Ibrahim Pasha in a series of fierce clashes that took place in the vicinity of Kastoria and Korçë that lasted throughout the summer.

Admiral Samuel Gibbs who replaced Zaborovsky, scolded the Souliotes for abandoning the service to the Russian crown in an official letter. Confusion ensued after Sotiris, Bitsilis and the Souliotes exchanged accusations of embezzling Russian funds. The Russian authorities received conflicting reports about the outcome of the hostilities due to this conflict. Realizing that the longevity of their peace with Ali Pasha depended entirely on the outcome of the Russo-Turkish War, the Souliotes dispatched Panos Tziras and Christos Lakkiotis to the Russian court in Saint Petersburg to clear their name. They were denied an audience in December 1789 but were granted admission in April 1790, receiving the empress' support.

In the aftermath of the Treaty of Jassy which put an end to the Russo-Turkish War, Ali Pasha once again sought to pacify the areas under his control. He bought or seized lands surrounding the Souliote villages and chased bandits and rebellious armatoloi into Venetian held Parga and Lefkada. His other target the Souliotes had resumed their indiscriminate raiding into a wide area from Paramythia to Pindus. Meanwhile, Ali was campaigning on the Danube against the Russians in spring 1791. In May 1792, he gathered 10,000 to 20,000 troops in preparation for an offensive against the Beys of Gjirokastër and Delvinë. The Souliotes were also called upon to participate but only Lambros Tzavelas and 70 of his men turned up. Tzavelas was immediately imprisoned and Souli was revealed to be the real target of the campaign. Georgios Botsaris organized the defense of the four Souliote villages. Lambros Tzavelas promised Ali the support of his clan but betrayed him and joined the defenders.

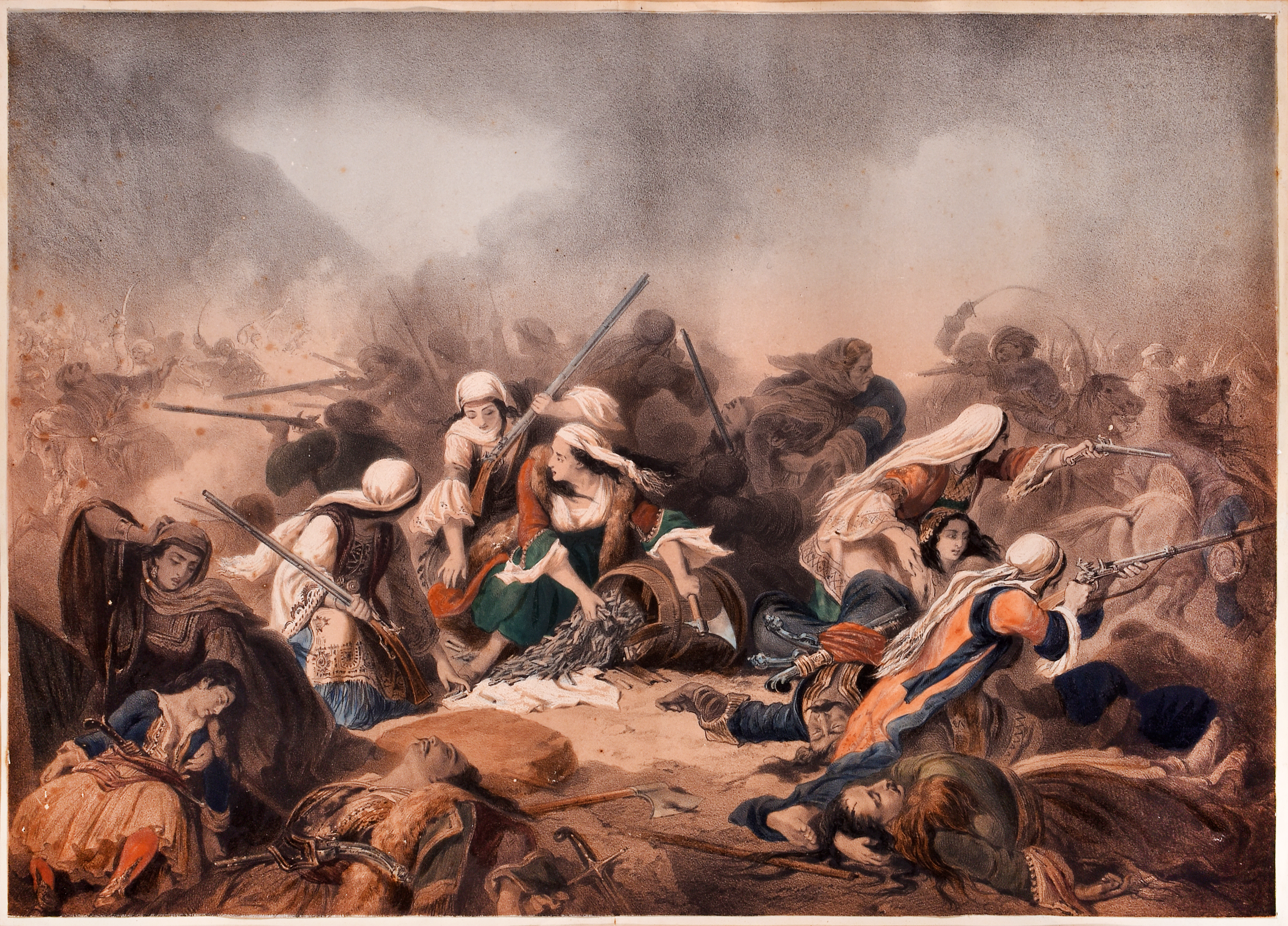
Moscho Tzavela during the battle of Kiafa, July 1792, as drawn by Alphonse de Neuville

On 26 July 1792, Ali's troops struck a village in the vicinity of Kiafa, forcing the Souliotes to withdraw. The next day, 1,000 men under Ali's son Mukhtar Pasha assaulted Kiafa, seizing the village. The Souliotes fell back to the heights surrounding the village inflicting heavy casualties on the troops that tried to dislodge them. Mukhtar Pasha was defeated and forced to retreat to Ioannina, initiating peace talks. According to Christoforos Perraivos, the battle resulted in the death of 2,000 Muslim Albanians and 74 Souliotes, while 97 Souliotes were wounded. Lambros Tzavelas was seriously injured in the battle and died from his wounds several years later. A Venetian chronicle put Ottoman casualties at 600. Talks lasted until April 1793, when the final peace treaty was signed. The rights of the Souliotes were upheld and Ali Pasha paid them 100,000 piastres in ransom for the prisoners of war they had taken at Kiafa. Fotos Tzavelas the son of Lambros Tzavelas was released from Ottoman captivity, but his clan was blamed for the war by the Souliotes and lost its former prestige.

== Aftermath ==
Ali Pasha saw an opportunity to resume his expansionist policies following the outbreak of the War of the Second Coalition. He gave 60 pouches of coins to Georgios Botsaris to secure the neutrality of the Souliotes during his conquest of the former Venetian coastal territories which had now passed to the French. Botsaris' refusal to share the bribe with his compatriots led to the expulsion of his entire clan from Souli. Botsaris then sided with Ali, prompting him to conquer the Souliot villages. Hostilities began in 1800 and culminated in the eventual defeat of the Souliotes in 1803.

== See also ==
- Greek Project
