= Tzavelas =

Tzavelas is a surname. Notable people with the surname include:

- Kitsos Tzavelas (1800–1855), Souliot fighter
- Lambros Tzavelas (1745–1792), Souliot leader
