= Tzavelas family =

Prominent Souliot family

The Tzavelas or Tzavellas family (Greek: Τζαβέλας/Τζαβέλλας, Albanian: Xhavella) were a prominent Souliot family, descended from Dragani of Paramythia, with their ancestor Papa-Zachos.

== Known members ==
Its most famous members were Lambros Tzavelas, Fotos Tzavelas and Kitsos Tzavelas.

=== Lambros Tzavelas ===
Lambros Tzavelas (1745–1792) was born in Souli and became the leader of the Tzavelas clan. In 1792 he was called by Ali Pasha of Ioannina to allegedly help him in his campaign, against Gjirokastër. Lambros and his son Fotos and 70 other Souliotes, despite the opinion of the other Souliotes, went to help Ali, but near Zitsa they caught them all and led them to Ioannina. Ali thought that if Lambros Zavelas was not the leader of the Souli, he would be able to understand it. However, his attacks were repelled with heroism and courage by the other Souliotes, so he resorted to deception. He freed Lambros from the Ioannina, holding Fotos hostage, and sent him to deliver the Souli to him. But when he arrived at Souli he wrote him the following historic letter: I am glad to have laughed at a trickster like you. I am here to crown Souli. If my son is not willing to die for the country, he is not worthy to live and be known as my son. Ali, full of anger and rage, threw himself in July 1792 against Souli with large forces. But he was defeated again and, ashamed, accepted peace and released the 70 Souliotes and Fotos. But in this battle Lambros died from his wounds.

=== Fotos Tzavelas ===
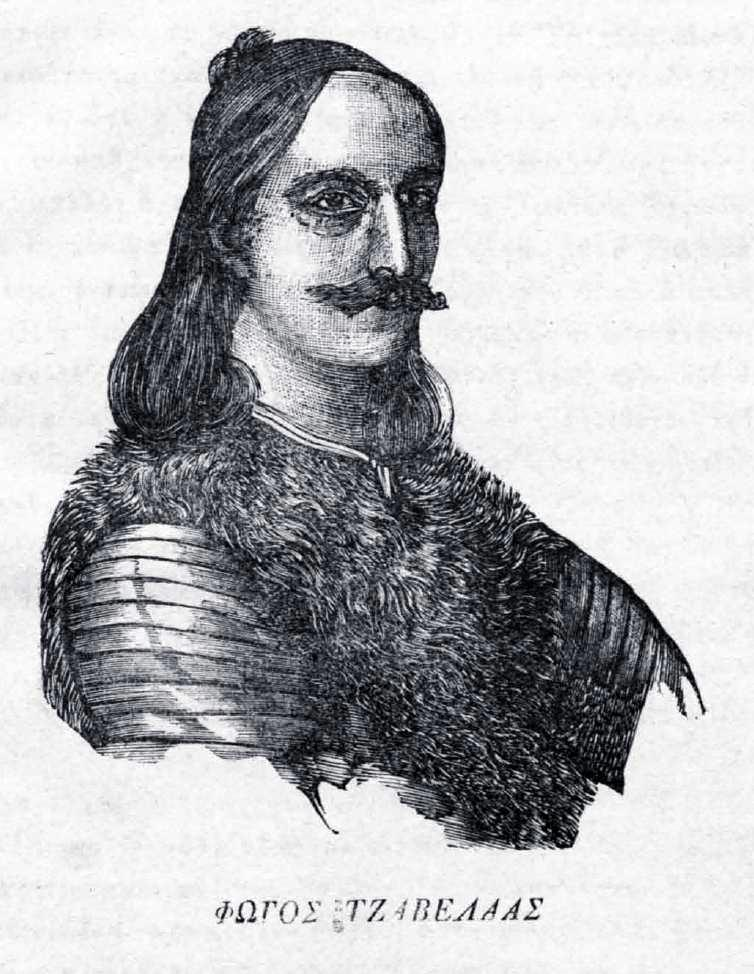
Fotos Tzavelas

Fotos Tzavelas (1770–1809) was a son of Lambros and Moscho Tzavela. After his release and the death of his father, he became the leader of the Souliotes. His fights against Ali Pasha were famous. He emerged as a great warlord and showed so much bravery that the Souliotes swore "by the sword of Light". Souli surrendered in 1803, Fotos with 2,000 Souliotes managed to pass to Parga and from there to Corfu, which was held by the French. Fotos enlisted in the French army as a centurion of the Greek legion. In 1809, he was assassinated in Corfu by agents of Ali Pasha and was buried in the monastery of Platytera, where his tomb is preserved to this day.

=== Moscho Tzavela ===
Moscho Tzavela (1750–1803) she was the wife of Lambros Tzavelas. He was born in 1750 and fought in 1792 against Ali Pasha, in the battle of Kiafa, as the leader of 400 Souliotisses. When Ottoman Albanian troops sent by Ali Pasha tried to capture the Souliotisses, they attacked them and managed to put them to flight. The heroism of Moscho has been immortalized in folk songs. After the destruction of Souli, Moscho followed the road to Parga and from there to Eptanisa. He finally died in 1803.

=== Zigouris Tzavelas ===
Zigouris Tzavelas he was the brother of Fotos Tzevelas. When he returned from Corfu in 1820, he fought alongside Ali Pasha against the troops of Hurshid Pasha. After the collapse of Ali and the new fall of Souli, he went down to Central Greece and took part in the Revolution at the head of the Souliotes. He was killed in the battle of Kaliakouda in Evrytania in 1823, fighting the Turks.

=== Kitsos Tzavelas ===
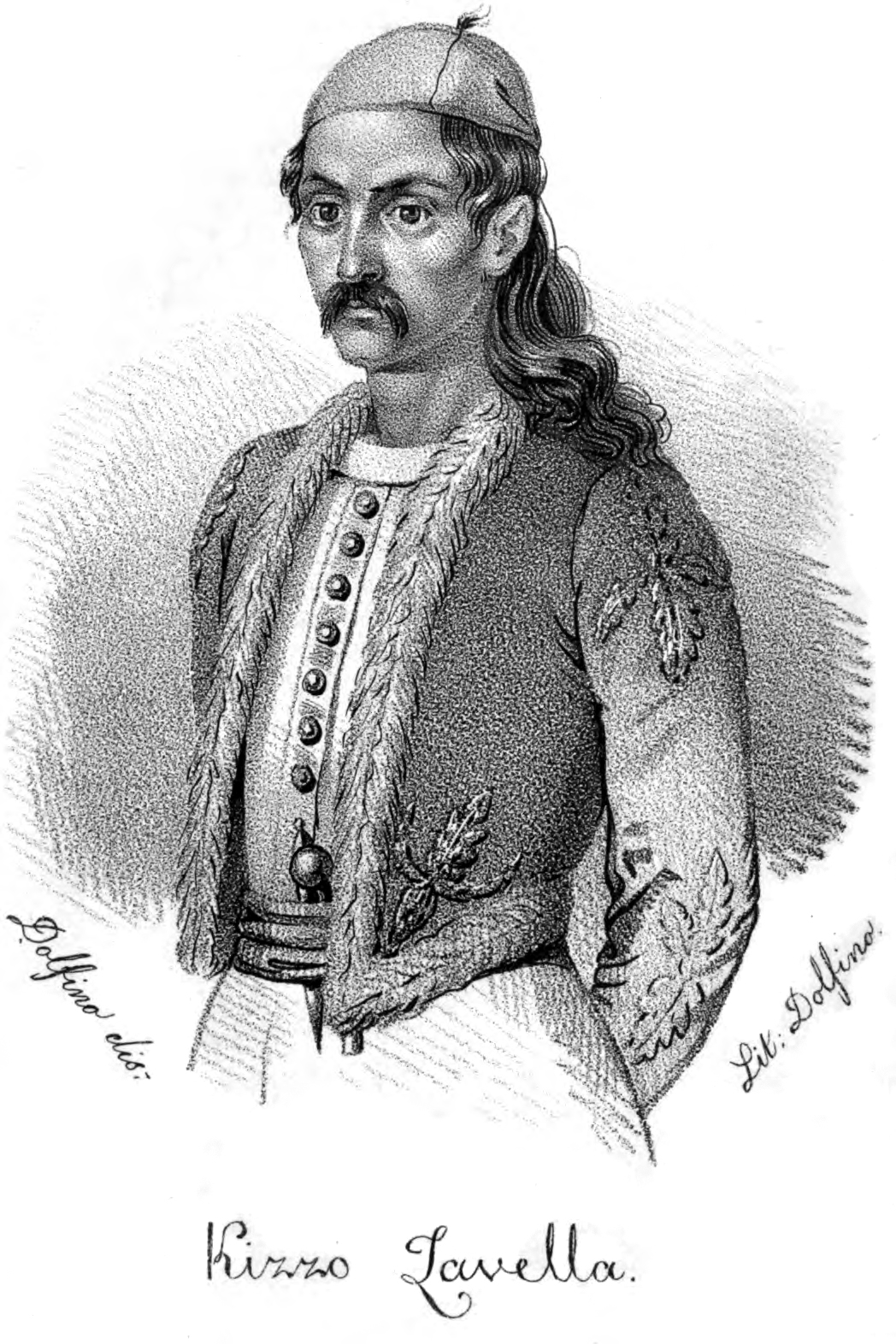
Kitsos Tzavelas from an Italian lithograph of 1840

Kitsos Tzavelas (1801–1855) he was the child of Fotos Tzavelas. He grew up in Corfu and in 1820 he returned with the Souliotes to Souli, where he was named captain at the age of just 19. He went to Pisa, Italy to confer with the Friends of the Revolution.

He collaborated with Karaiskakis in the victory of Ambliani in 1824. He fought at Distomo and the Onion. He broke up the troops of Reşid Mehmed Pasha in June 1825 at Missolonghi and entered the city. On 25 March 1826, he starred in the battle of Kleisova, in which, at the head of 137 fighters in the church of the Holy Trinity, they repelled the Turkish-Egyptian troops that tried to occupy the islet, causing them terrible losses (about 3,500 Ottoman dead and wounded). During the heroic exodus of the Messolongites, a leader of 2,500 men broke through the lines of the Turks and went to Salona with 1,300 men. He took part with Karaiskakis in the battles of Attica and, after the death of his partner, he was entrusted with the chief strategy temporarily. Kapodistrias made him a thousandaire. Together with Kolokotronis, during the years of the Regency, he was thrown into prison. Otto made him lieutenant general and later lieutenant general and adjutant. In 1844 he was appointed Minister of Military Affairs in the Kolettis government, in 1847–1848 Prime Minister and in 1849 Minister of Military Affairs again. He is one of the three best warriors of 1821 along with Kolokotronis and Androutsos.

=== Giorgos Tzavelas ===
Giorgos Tzavelas was the brother of Kitsos Tzavelas. He took part in many battles and was wounded in the second siege of Missolonghi. In the exodus of the Messolongites he was saved together with his brother Kitsos. But he was killed during the Siege of the Acropolis in 1827.

=== Nikolaos Tzavelas ===
Nikolaos Tzavelas (1881–1921) took part in the 1897 war as an officer, also in the Macedonian Struggle, the Balkan Wars and Asia Minor, where he was killed with the rank of major in the battle of Kale-Groto in 1921.

=== Kostas Tzavelas ===
Kostas Tzavelas was a general during the Greco-Italian War of 1940. He distinguished himself in 11 victorious battles and fell on 2 December 1940, in the battle of Përmet.
