= Tzavela =

Tzavela is a surname. Notable people with the surname include:

- Moscho Tzavela (1760–1803), Greek heroine
- Photini Tzavela (1809/11–1890), Greek lady-in-waiting
- Niki Tzavela (born 1947), Greek politician
