= Franco-Ottoman War =

Franco-Ottoman Wars may refer to several wars between France and Ottoman Empire:

- Crusade of Nicopolis (1396)
- War of Candia (1648–1669)
- Austro-Turkish War (1663–1664)
- Franco-Ottoman War of 1798–1802:
  - War of the Second Coalition (1798–1802)
  - French invasion of Egypt and Syria (1798–1801)
  - Mediterranean campaign of 1798
- Greek War of Independence (1827–1833)
- Egyptian–Ottoman War (1839–1841)
- Cretan Revolt (1897–1898)
- World War I (1914–1918)
