= Siege of Butrint (1798) =

Ottoman victory over France in Albania

- Part of the Franco-Turkish War of 1798–1801
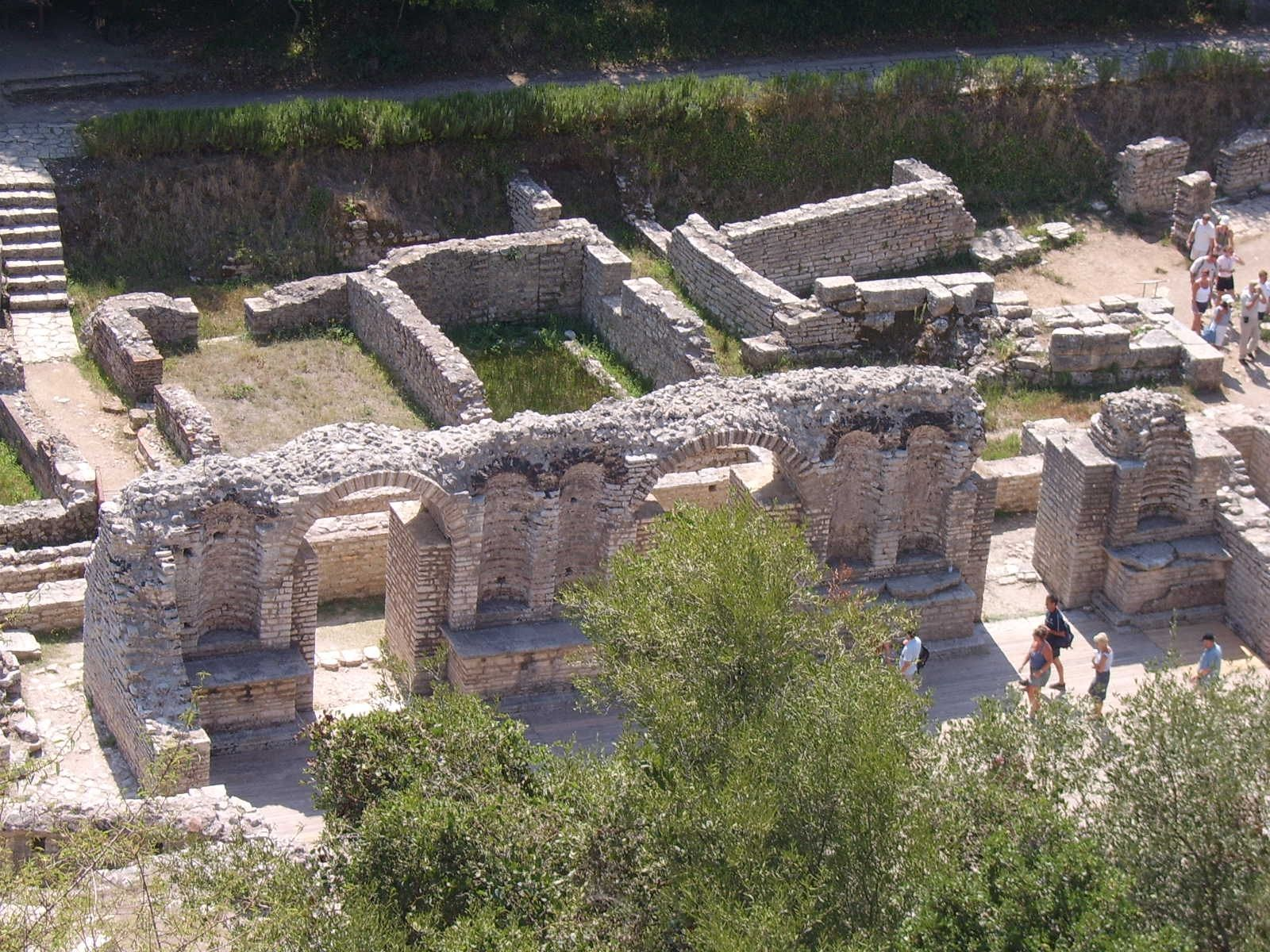
- Agora in Butrint, Albania
Date	18–25 October [O.S. 7–14 October] 1798
Location	Butrint, modern-day Albania
Result	Victory of Ali Pasha
Territorial changes	The Pashalik of Yanina occupies Butrint; French evacuate to Corfu

Belligerents
Pashalik of Yanina	France

Commanders and leaders
Ali Pasha of Yanina	Nicolas Gregoire Aulmont; Louis Chabot

Strength
20,000	Unknown

Casualties and losses
Unknown	Unknown

The siege of Butrint took place on 18–25 October [O.S. 7–14 October] 1798 between Revolutionary France and Ali Pasha of Janina, the ruler of the semi-autonomous Ottoman Pashalik of Yanina.

== Background ==
The French had seized the Venetian Ionian Islands off the western coast of Greece the previous year, after the fall of the Republic of Venice. The islands also included a few mainland exclaves like Butrint and Preveza, which were coveted by Ali.

== Siege ==
French efforts to draw Ali into their camp against the Ottoman sultan failed, and when the Ottoman Empire turned against France, Ali attacked the French positions, attacking Butrint first. The French, led by Nicolas Gregoire Aulmont of Verrières and eventually by the French governor-general, Louis François Jean Chabot, resisted for a week, but finally withdrew from the fortress and blew it up. At the same time, Ali Pasha's army moved to capture Preveza to the south.

== Sources ==
- Baeyens, Jacques (1973). Les Français à Corfou, 1797-1799 et 1807-1814 [The French in Corfu, 1797-1799 and 1807-1814] (in French). Athens: Institut français d'Athènes. OCLC 2763024.
- Fleming, Katherine Elizabeth (1999). The Muslim Bonaparte: Diplomacy and Orientalism in Ali Pasha's Greece. Princeton University Press. ISBN 978-0-69100194-4.
- Moschonas, Nikolaos (1975). "Τα Ιόνια Νησιά κατά την περίοδο 1797-1821" [The Ionian Islands in the period 1797-1821]. In Christopoulos, Georgios A. & Bastias, Ioannis K. (eds.). Ιστορία του Ελληνικού Έθνους [History of the Greek Nation] (in Greek). Vol. ΙΑ: Ο Ελληνισμός υπό ξένη κυριαρχία (περίοδος 1669 - 1821), Τουρκοκρατία - Λατινοκρατία [Hellenism under Foreign Rule (Period 1669 - 1821), Turkocracy – Latinocracy]. Athens: Ekdotiki Athinon. pp. 382–402. ISBN 978-960-213-100-8.
