= Canberdi Ghazâlî Revolt =

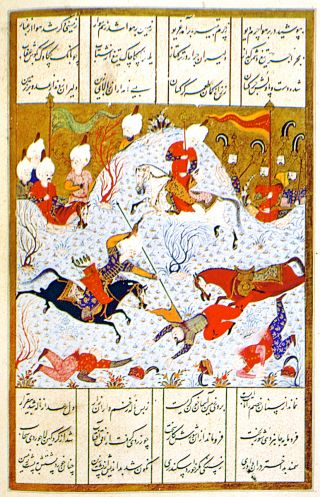
Date	1521–27 January 1521
Location	Damascus Eyalet, Ottoman Empire
Result	Ottoman victory: Rebellion suppressed

Belligerents
Damascus Eyalet	Ottoman Empire

Commanders and leaders
Janbirdi al-Ghazali (executed)	Karaca Ahmed Pasha; Farhad Pasha; Ali of Dulkadir

Canberdi Ghazâlî Revolt was a rebellion organized in 1521 by Canberdi Ghazâlî, Beylerbeyi of Damascus Province of the Ottoman Empire.

== Rebellion ==
Canberdi Ghazâlî, the Beylerbeyi of Damascus during the reign of the Ottoman Sultan Selim I, attacked Aleppo in a rebellion after the death of the sultan. In response, Sultan Suleiman I, who succeeded Selim, assigned troops under the command of Ferhad Pasha to suppress the rebellion. Until Ferhad Pasha moved to the region, he ordered the troops in the Zülkadriye Province to be transferred to Aleppo. While the troops in Aleppo and Canberdi Ghazali's forces were in conflict, Ghazali retreated to Damascus upon learning that reinforcements were coming to the city. The rebellion was suppressed after Ghazali was defeated and killed in a battle between Ghazali's forces and the central troops in the Mastaba region near Damascus on January 27, 1521.
