= Nicolas Gregoire Aulmont of Verrières =

French brigadier general

Nicolas Gregoire Aulmont
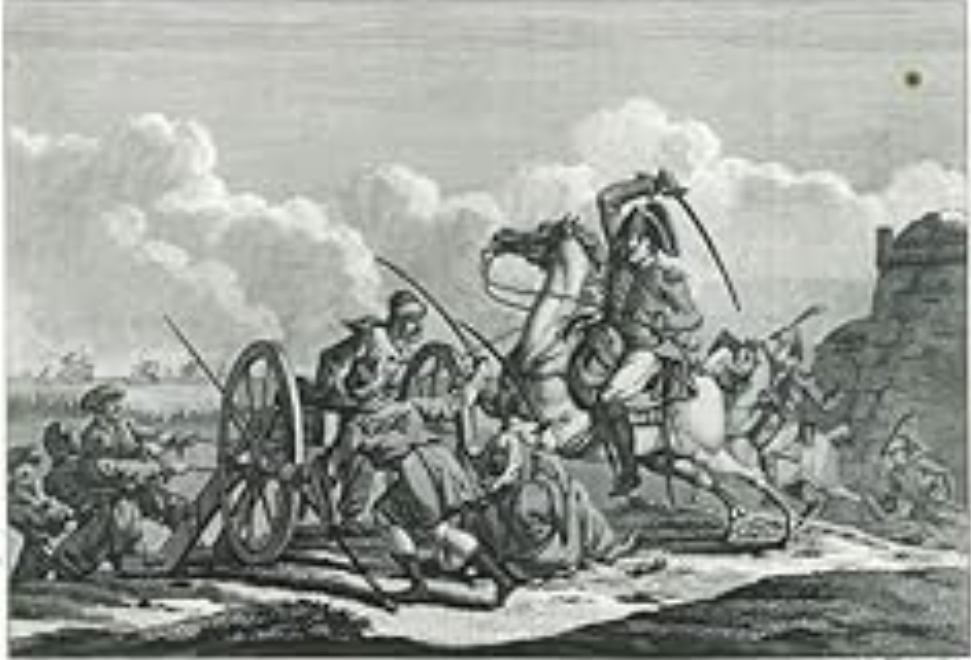
- Portrait of Nicolas Gregoire Aulmont de Verrieres by Abraham Jacobsz in 1820.
- Born: 5 August 1746; Paris, France
- Died: 10 November 1830 (aged 84) Saint-Germain-en-Laye, Yvelines, France
- Branch: (France) French Army; Artillery
- Service years: 1762–1810
- Rank: General de brigade
- Commands: Ionian Islands, Silesia, Glogow and Landau
- Conflicts: French Revolutionary Wars; Mediterranean campaign of 1798; Siege of Butrint; Siege of Corfu; Napoleonic Wars
- Awards: Baron of the Empire; Commander of the Legion of Honor; Knight of Saint-Louis

Nicolas Gregoire Aulmont of Verrières (born 5 August 1746 – 10 November 1831) also simply known as Nicolas Gregoire Aulmont was a French brigadier general known for his activity during the French Revolutionary Wars in the Mediterranean campaign of 1798 where he was deployed in the Ionian Islands where he fought in the Siege of Butrint against the forces of the Pashalik of Yanina.

== Biography ==
Nicolas Gregoire Aulmont was born on 5 August 1746 in the French capital of Paris. He entered military service on 6 March 1762, at the age of 16 in the cavalry company of the Gendarmes of the Kings Guard before being moved to the artillery corps on 30 November 1765. He was promoted to captain of the Metz arsenal in 1783, leading to him winning the cross of Saint-Louis in April 1790. He was named second in command of the engineer corps on 30 August 1793. During the years of 1794-1795, Nicolas Gregoire Aulmont served in the Army of the Eastern Pyrenees, leading to his promotion to a brigadier general on 16 October 1795. He served in the French army in Italy from 1796, where he commanded the artillery in the Siege of Milan until the end of the battle on 29 June of the same year.

=== Deployment to the Ionian Islands ===
In the year of 1789, Nicolas Gregoire Aulmont was deployed in the Ionian Islands, in the city of Butrint where he led the artillery of the city. Butrint was besieged by the forces of the Pashalik of Yanina led by Ali Pasha of Ioannina on 18 October 1789. Nicolas himself played a crucial role in defending the fort, mounting a howitzer, and together with the French general Louis François Jean Chabot he was able to resist the Albanian-Ottoman attacks for more a week until 25 October when they withdrew. Before the withdrawal the French forces exploded the fortress to not allow it to fall into enemy hands.

Afterwards, Nicolas Gregoire Aulmont also partook in the Siege of Corfu (1798–1799), during which he was able to recapture a cannon seized by the Ottomans, however Corfu fell on 3 March 1799, leading to Nicolas Gregoire Aulmont returning to France.

=== Return and death ===
Upon returning to France, Nicolas was appointed as commander of the 17th Military Division and earned the sabre of honor on 9 November 1799. In 1800 he was then deployed in the Army of the Grisons under Etienne Macdonald, leading to him taking part in the campaign of Splügen. Afterwards he joined the VIII Corps of the Grande Armée for which he fought for until 1810 and also being made a Commander of the Legion of Honor on 14 June 1804. He retired from the army after 58 years of service in 1810, before dying on 10 November 1831 in Saint-Germain-en-Laye, Yvelines.
