= Fotos Tzavelas =

Fotos Tzavelas Foto Xhavella
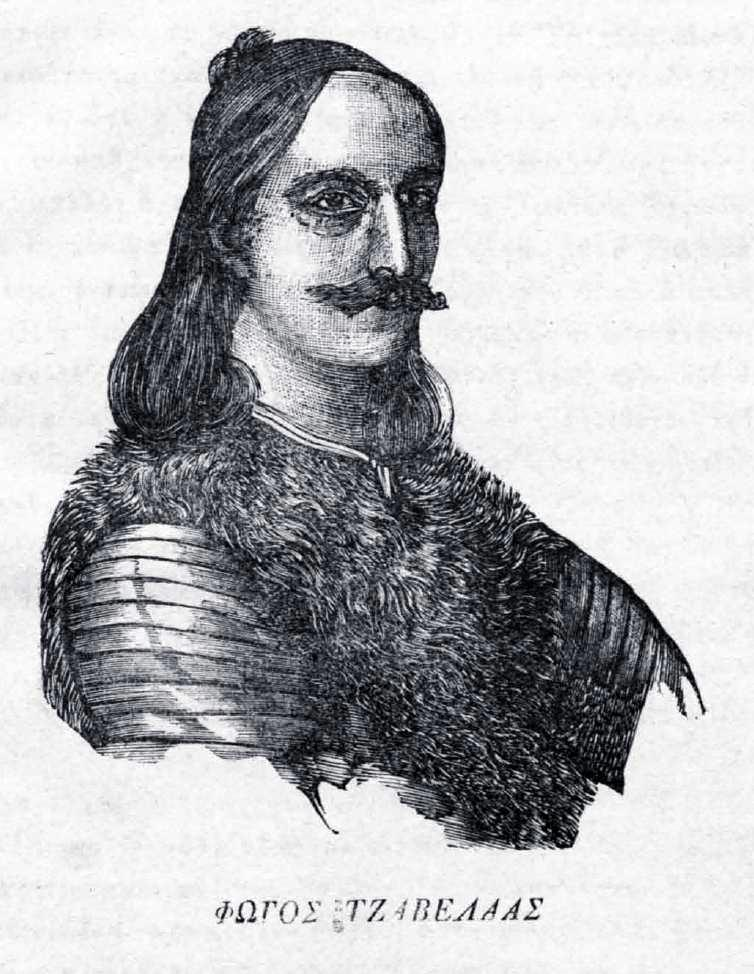
- Born: Fotos Tzavelas c. 1770; Souli, Ottoman Empire
- Died: 1809 (~ aged 39); Corfu, Ionian Islands
- Spouse: Despo Tzavela
- Children: Nikolaos; Kitsos; Ioannis; Konstantinos; Fotini
- Parents: Lambros Tzavelas (father); Moscho Tzavela (mother)

Fotos Tzavelas or Tzavellas (Greek: Φώτος Τζαβέλας/Τζαβέλλας; Albanian: Foto Xhavella; c. 1770 – 1809) was a Souliot clan leader and fighter.

== Biography ==
The Tzavelas family was a well-known clan from the region of Souli in Epirus, who played an important role in the struggles of the Souliotes and during the Greek War of Independence. Fotos Tzavelas was the first-born son of Lambros and Moscho Tzavela. He succeeded his father in the leadership of the Souliotes after the battle of Kiafa and the defeat of Ali Pasha, after which Ali was forced to exchange the hostages that he had held since 1792 with important Albanians who had been captured by the Souliotes. Thus he freed Fotos who returned to Souli, and, after his father's death, the Souliotes elected him their leader. Despite the defeat, Ali Pasha launched new attacks (1800 - 1803) against the Souliotes. The attacks of Ali against the Souliots did not bring any results, in the summer of 1800. That is why Ali decided and built towers in the area around Souli, and besieged the Souliotes with his army. Fotos Tzavelas distinguished himself in these battles for his heroism and leadership skills. He turned out to be a great warlord and showed so much bravery that the Souliotes took oaths "by the sword of Fotos". In December 1803, Ali occupied Souli and the Souliotes were forced to disperse (see also Dance of Zalongo). Fotos Tzavelas fled to Parga and then to Corfu, then part of the Septinsular Republic under Russian and Ottoman rule, where, before long, many Souliot clans had taken refuge.

Souliotic Albanian-language folk songs from their stay in Corfu name him as responsible for the Souliots leaving their land.

In Corfu he served as an officer in the Greek Legion, a military corps created by the Russians, in order to protect the Ionian Islands. Other Souliotes, many klephts, local islanders and volunteers from the mainland of Epirus had joined the Legion.

In August 1805 the Greek Legion participated in the Anglo-Russian invasion of Naples, alongside 14,000 Russian and 10,000 British troops. The expedition was cut short, however, by Napoleon's decisive victory at the Battle of Austerlitz in December and changing allegiances of the Neapolitan government. On 7 January 1806, the Russians were forced to abandon the Italian mainland to the French. Fotos Tzavelas particularly distinguished himself during this campaign.

In 1807 Corfu was occupied by the French. Fotos Tzavelas was designated by the French as a chiliarch in the Albanian Regiment. He died in 1809 from an unknown cause and was buried in the monastery of Panagia Platytera, where his tomb is preserved to this day.

An Albanian-speaker, Tzavelas's written communication with other Albanian-speakers was in Greek, as was the case with Albanian-speakers in the Chameria region and generally in Epirus, while a diary he kept demonstrates the Souliots's adequate use of Greek in the late eighteenth century.

== Family ==
With his wife, Despo, they had four sons, Nikolaos, Kitsos, Ioannis or Bakatselos and Konstantinos, who lived and took part in the Greek Revolution. He also had a daughter Fotini, who married Gennaios Kolokotronis in 1828.

== Sources ==
- Kallivretakis, Leonidas (2003). "Ένοπλα Ελληνικά σώματα στη δίνη των Ναπολεοντείων πολέμων (1798-1815)" [Greek armed corps in the throes of the Napoleonic wars (1798-1815)]. Ιστορία του Νέου Ελληνισμού 1770-2000, Τόμος 1: Η Οθωμανική κυριαρχία, 1770-1821 [History of Modern Hellenism 1770-2000, Volume 1: Ottoman rule, 1770-1821] (in Greek). Athens: Ellinika Grammata. pp. 185–200. hdl:10442/8780. ISBN 960-406-540-8.
- Oikonomou, Foivos (2016). Ελληνες Μισθοφόροι στην Υπηρεσία της Επαναστατικής Γαλλίας (1789-1815) [Greek Mercenaries in the Service of Revolutionary France (1789-1815)] (in Greek). Thessaloniki: University Studio Press. ISBN 978-960-12-2251-6.
- Ψιμούλη, Βάσω Δ. (2006). Σούλι και Σουλιώτες [Souli and the Souliots] (in Greek) (4th ed.). Athens: Βιβλιοπωλείον της Εστίας.
- Πάπυρος Λαρούς Μπριτάνικα, Vol. 57, article Τζαβέλας (Φώτος)
- "Ιστορία του Σουλίου και Πάργας", Χ. Περραιβός
- Στασινόπουλος Χρήστος, Λεξικό της Ελληνικής Επαναστάσεως του 1821, Vol. IV, (2021,ειδική έκδοση για ΤΟ ΒΗΜΑ), Εκδόσεις Δεδεμάδη, Μάρτιος 1979
