= Battle of Beirut (1520) =

- Part of the Crusades
Date	9 October 1520
Location	Beirut
Result	Ottoman victory

Belligerents
Ottoman Empire	Kingdom of France

Commanders and leaders
(Ottoman Empire) Janbirdi al-Ghazali	(Kingdom of France) Christoph le Mignon †

Strength
Unknown	15 ships 800 men

Casualties and losses
Unknown	484 killed

The Battle of Beirut was a military engagement between the French expeditionary force that invaded Beirut and the Ottomans at Beirut. The French landed and attempted to sack Beirut; however, they suffered an ambush by the Ottomans, suffering heavy losses, including the death of the expedition commander.

== Background ==
In the 16th century, the Ottomans dominated the Middle East, stopping the Safavids and destroying the Mamluk Sultanate. They became the new rulers of Syria and Egypt but faced uprisings from the old Mamluk elite. These Ottoman victories alerted Christian Europe, which led Pope Leo X to give the French king Francis I a cross-shaped reliquary in 1515, encouraging him to lead a crusade. In 1516, Pope Leo X asked Christian rulers to take action against the Muslims. The Ottoman victories made Francis, Charles I, and Maximilian I sign the Treaty of Cambrai on March 1517, which was to unite against the Ottoman expansion.

However, none of Francis and Pope's calls led to anything. Francis wanted to keep his word; he entrusted a flotilla led by Christoph le Mignon. The French flotilla was dispatched to help the Knights Hospitaller in Rhodes Island. This was due to rumors of a possible Ottoman attack against the island. However, the death of Sultan Selim I in September 1520 temporarily delayed the Ottomans' attention from Rhodes to the accession of Selim's son, Suleiman the Magnificent. Unwilling to return to France without a victory, he decided in October 1520 to attack Beirut.

== Battle ==
The French flotilla consisted of 15 ships and 800 men. At dawn on October 9, 1520. News would reach the Venetians regarding an approach of the French navy against Beirut, and they quickly reported it to the Ottoman authority in Beirut. The French began bombarding Beirut. The tower, standing on an island in Beirut harbor, fired back, but its cannonballs all dropped into the water. Meanwhile, the French began landing their forces. As they approached Beirut, the French soldiers fell into an ambush by the Ottomans, who were led by Janbirdi al-Ghazali. After a battle that lasted for an hour and a half, 484 French soldiers, including the commander, were killed during the battle. The rest managed to escape back to the ships. The Ottoman commander had the heads of the dead soldiers decapitated and planted on the city wall's battlements.

== Aftermath ==
News of the victory at Beirut would reach Damascus and Cairo. French commanders blamed their defeat on the Venetians; however, the French themselves disagreed on what to do with spoils before the attack was launched. The French defeat in Beirut in 1520 was a clear military disaster that took many lives, but it wasn't the only factor that made Francis I less interested in crusading. He needed to focus more on the risk of encirclement of France by Germany and Spain together. On October 14, while Janbirdi was inspecting the damage on the walls caused by the French, news arrived that Selim had died and his son had succeeded him. He quickly went to Damascus and declared his revolt against the Sultan which led to his downfall.

== See also ==
- Franco-Turkish War (1798–1802)
- French campaign in Egypt and Syria
- Franco-Turkish War (1918–1921)
- France–Turkey relations

== Sources ==
- Albrecht Fuess (2005), Prelude to a Stronger Involvement in the Middle East: French Attacks on Beirut in the Years 1403 and 1520.
- Joos Vermeulen (2001), Sultans, slaves and renegades the hidden history of the Ottoman Empire (In Dutch).
- Mary McKinley (2013), An Ottoman “Fixer” in Marguerite de Navarre's Heptaméron.
