= Battle of Nicopolis (1798) =

Battle of the Franco-Turkish War of 1798–1801

- Part of the Franco-Turkish War of 1798–1801
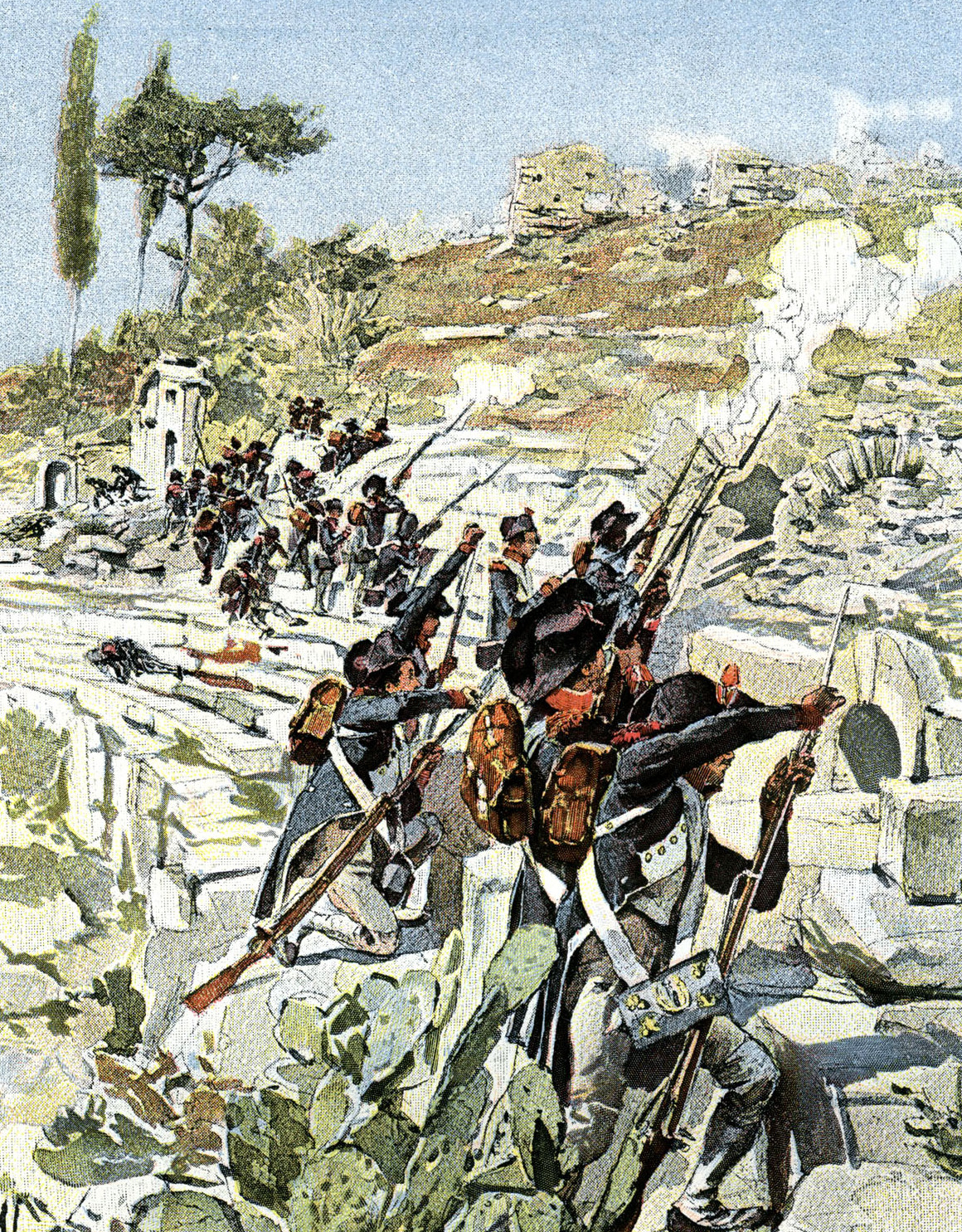
- Illustration of the battle by Felician Myrbach
Date	23 October [O.S. 12 October] 1798
Location	Nicopolis and Preveza 39°00′47″N 20°43′35″E
Result	Victory of Ali Pasha

Belligerents
Pashalik of Yanina	France

Commanders and leaders
Ali Pasha of Yanina	Jean Jacques Bernardin Colaud de La Salcette (surrendered)

Strength
4,000–20,000 Albanian troops	300–600 French troops 260-600 Prevezan civil guards and Souliotes; One company of Oltremarini

Casualties and losses
Unknown killed or wounded	Unknown killed or wounded 157 captured
- Location within Greece

The Battle of Nicopolis was fought on 23 October [O.S. 12 October] 1798 between a French-led army and the autonomous Pashalik of Yanina ruled by Ali Pasha of Yanina. France had occupied the Venetian Ionian Islands off the western coast of Greece in 1797 after the fall of the Republic of Venice in the same year. The islands also included a few mainland exclaves like Butrint and Preveza, which were coveted by Ali. French efforts to draw Ali into their camp against Sultan Selim III failed, and when the Ottoman Empire declared war on France Ali attacked the French positions. The battle, which took place amidst the ruins of the ancient city of Nicopolis, resulted in a French defeat, and was followed by a devastating sack of Preveza.

== Background ==
At the end of the 18th century, the Ionian Islands (Corfu, Zakynthos, Cephalonia, Lefkada, Ithaca, and Kythira) along with a handful of exclaves on the Epirote mainland, namely the towns of Parga, Preveza, Arta, Vonitsa, and Butrint, were the sole remaining overseas possessions of the once mighty Republic of Venice in Greece. In 1797, a French campaign led by Napoleon resulted in the fall of the Republic of Venice. French forces under Divisional-general Antoine Gentili landed in the islands in June, and on 17 October the signing of the Treaty of Campo Formio resulted in them being annexed to France as departments.

The main external concern of the new French administration was its relationship to its most important neighbour, the powerful and ambitious Ali Pasha of Yanina, the Albanian ruler of the semi-autonomous Pashalik of Yanina, which encompassed much of Albania and mainland Greece. Both sides initially sought good relations: Gentili met in person with Ali at Butrint during his tour of the islands, and French envoys were frequent visitors at his court in Yanina. Ali managed to convince the French of his good intentions, showering them with honours and providing food—and even feigning interest in Jacobin ideals—but his main objective, the cession of the mainland exclaves of the Ionian Islands, was rebuffed by the French. On the other hand, the French also failed to move Ali into open opposition to Sultan Selim III, and Napoleon's invasion of Egypt in 1798, which led Ali to develop deep concerns about ultimate French designs. While French authorities in the Ionian Islands believed in Ali's friendship and considered that his domains shielded them from attack by the Sultan's forces, Ali, after a period of prevarication, decided to side with Selim III, particularly after news of the French defeat in the Battle of the Nile.

In July 1798, the Ottoman Empire concluded an anti-French alliance with the Russian Empire. After the Ottomans declaring war on France, a joint Ottoman–Russian fleet set sail for the Ionian Islands. Ali mobilized his men around Butrint, and sent letters to the French governor demanding the cession not only of the mainland exclaves, but of Corfu itself. Ali's forces first moved on Butrint, which they captured after a week of heavy fighting on 25 October. The French blew up the fortifications and evacuated to Corfu, along with the Greek inhabitants of the town and its environs. Ali then turned to Preveza, and appeared before the city on 22 October, accompanied by his son Mukhtar Pasha.

== Opposing forces ==
French forces in Preveza were commanded by Brigade-general Jean Jacques Bernardin Colaud de La Salcette. Their exact size is unclear, with reports ranging from 300 to 600, but the most reliable accounts are between 380 and 460 men. They were complemented by local auxiliaries from Preveza, as well as some Souliotes. The numbers given for the auxiliaries are also unclear, starting from 260 up to 600. The most reliable figures, coming from the French officer Joseph Pierre Bellaire, give 440 French troops comprising 381 men from the 6th and 79th half-brigades, 41 sappers and 18 artillerymen. Bellaire's records also give 200 Prevezans and 60 Souliotes. The Souliotes were under the command of Christakis Kalogeros, and included in their ranks a young Christoforos Perraivos.

The fortifications of Preveza were limited to the Castle of Saint Andrew in the middle of the city. Built by the Ottomans in the early 18th century, it was very small and in a very poor state, as well as being indefensible due to the nearby houses being higher than its walls. When the French had occupied the town, they found a company of Schiavoni marines, from the late corps of Oltremarini, and three guns in place. Anticipating an attack, the French had therefore begun erecting fieldworks at the isthmus leading to Preveza, at the site of ancient Nicopolis. The work was directed by Captain of Engineers Louis-Auguste Camus de Richemont, and was carried out by the local population as well as the French troops and their auxiliaries. In somewhat over two weeks, the French erected two square artillery redoubts on two small hills. The left redoubt, towards the Ionian Sea, was likely larger, and was selected as the command post by La Salcete. It was equipped with three old Venetian three-pounder guns, and a detachment of 80 men was stationed there as a reserve. The right redoubt, towards the Ambracian Gulf, was commanded by Richemont, and had two guns of the same Venetian make. According to Richemont, it was located on top of an ancient burial mound. Further fortifications in the form of palisades and trenches were envisaged, but it is unclear how far they were completed; it appears that by the time of the battle, the French were positioned in five discontinuous trenches. This central portion of the French front was likely commanded by chef de brigade (major) Jean Baptiste Hotte, and included the Souliotes under Kalogeros.

The size of Ali Pasha's army is also unknown, with estimates given from 4,000 to over 20,000 men. The French soldiers who were present in the battle report the Albanian army at 10,000–15,000 men, with most sources citing 11,000. Other historians give a more detailed breakdown of 4,000 infantry and 3,000 cavalry. Ali made his camp at a hill called Michalitsi, likely at or on the Monument of Augustus, which commanded a good view of the battlefield.

== Battle ==
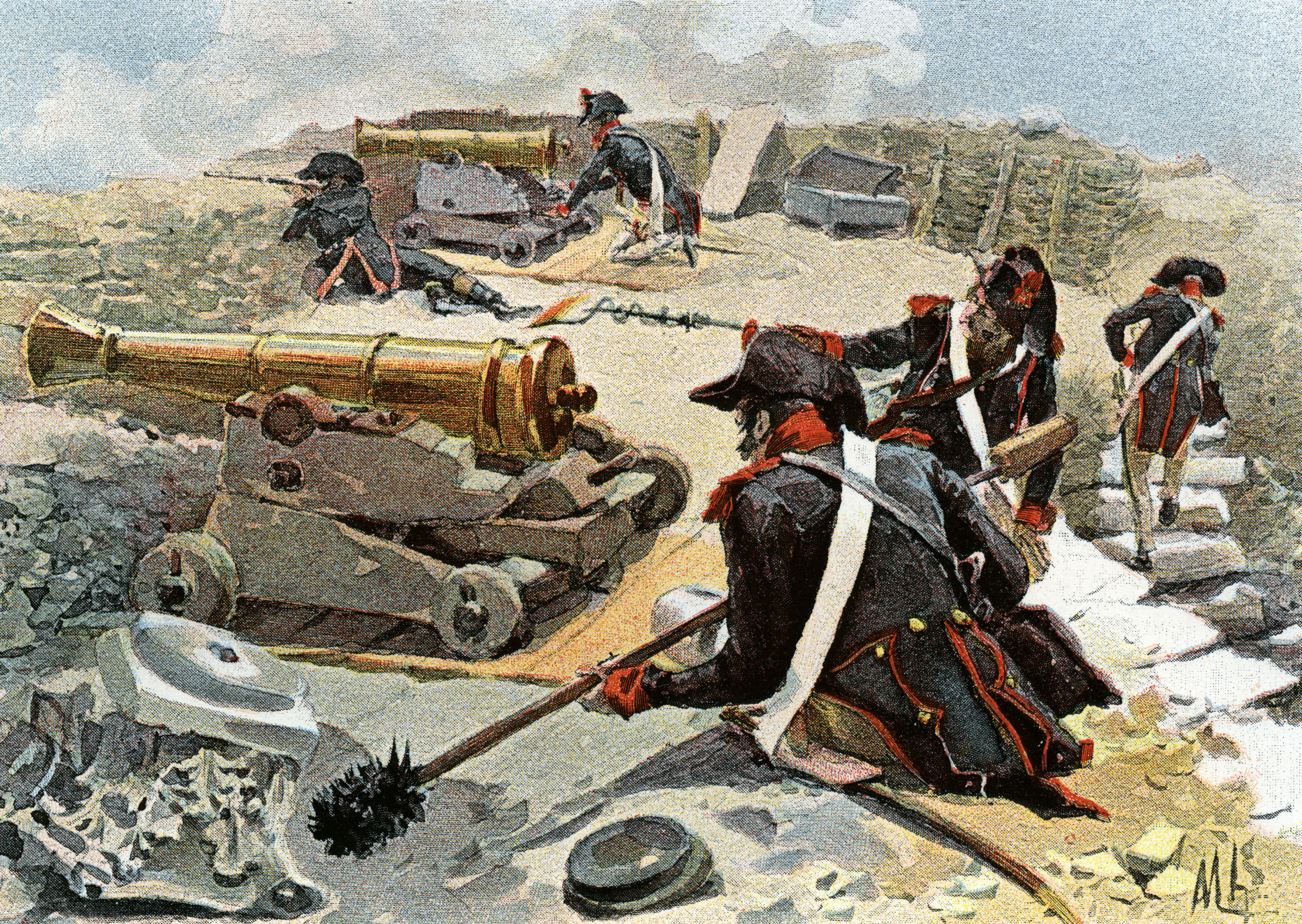
French guns on the rightwards redoubt

The course of the subsequent battle is also not entirely clear, as the eyewitness and third-hand accounts offer partial views of the event at best. According to the reconstruction by the historian James S. Curlin, already at midnight on 22/23 October the Albanians fired their guns, accompanied by loud cries. La Salcette and Richemont left their quarters in Preveza and headed to the fortifications to assume command. 50 French troops were left in Preveza under Captain Blanc to maintain order, and a further 50 were stationed outside the city under Captain Jean-Marie Tissot as a rearguard and to cover a French retreat. The right of the French center was given to the local civil guard under Panos Tzarlabas. The first attack was launched by 500 Albanians under Mukhtar Pasha shortly after. Either then or shortly before that, Christakis Kalogeros, Perraivos, and seventy Prevezans deserted the French lines and made for the shore, from where they escaped on boats to the Ionian Islands.

At around 03:00, firing resumed, and continued sporadically until daybreak, when two French grenadier companies counter-attacked and drove the Albanians back to the ancient theatre of Nicopolis. After a company commander was killed, the Albanians took advantage of the disorder in the French lines to push them back again. Worried that his men were spread too thinly La Salcette ordered his men to return to their original positions, but the execution of this manoeuvre failed due to the broken terrain and the pressure of the Albanians. At around 08:00, Ali Pasha launched the mass of his army against the French. The latter held for a couple of hours, but a charge by Ali's cavalry broke their lines, and the battle descended into hand-to-hand fighting.

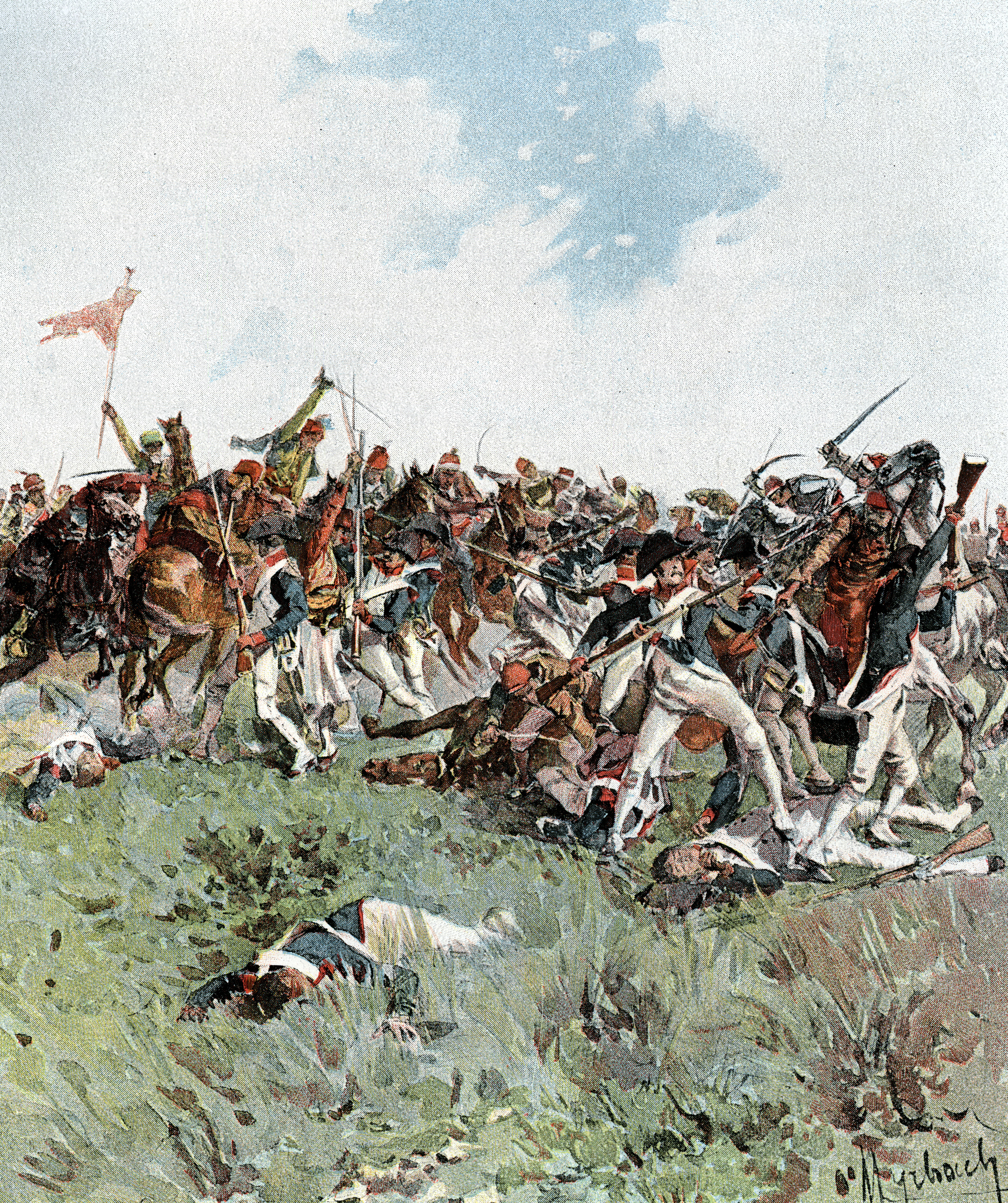
French infantry fighting Albanian cavalry

The Prevezans holding the centre, arrayed in two ranks and assisted by the French artillery, inflicted heavy casualties on their attackers, but after a few of their officers fled they too broke in disorder. As a result, the right redoubt was flanked and captured. Trying to reach the left redoubt, which was still resisting, Richemont was captured after a series of combats. While the left redoubt was still fighting, the fall of the right side of the French line opened the way to Preveza, and a mass of Albanian soldiers headed that way. After some time, the left redoubt fell as well, and La Salcette taken prisoner. Tissot with 80 men tried to rescue his commander. Moving at speed through the ruins of Nicopolis, they repulsed cavalry attacks, but were finally stopped by the Albanian infantry and forced to conduct a slow fighting retreat. On the extreme right of the French line, Tzarlabas and his Prevezans, aided by the Souliotes under the klepht Zacharakis, were still resisting until noon, when the Albanians abandoned the fight with them and Tissot's group and moved to capture Preveza.

At Preveza, the small French garrison in the Castle of Saint Andrew was quickly overwhelmed. Tissot and his men eventually fought their way into the town, finding the Albanians in control. They made for the residence of the local French consul, Pierre-Jérôme Dupré, where they held their ground for a few hours against repeated attacks with their backs to the sea. They hoped for assistance from the gunboat La Frimaire, which was at anchor off Preveza, but her captain, having received false news that no French troops had survived the battle, set sail and left before the eyes of Tissot's men. Tissot's detachment nevertheless continued resisting, allowing many Prevezan civilians to escape by sea, until at last, exhausted and out of ammunition, Tissot's men were captured by the Albanians c. 15:30.

== Aftermath ==
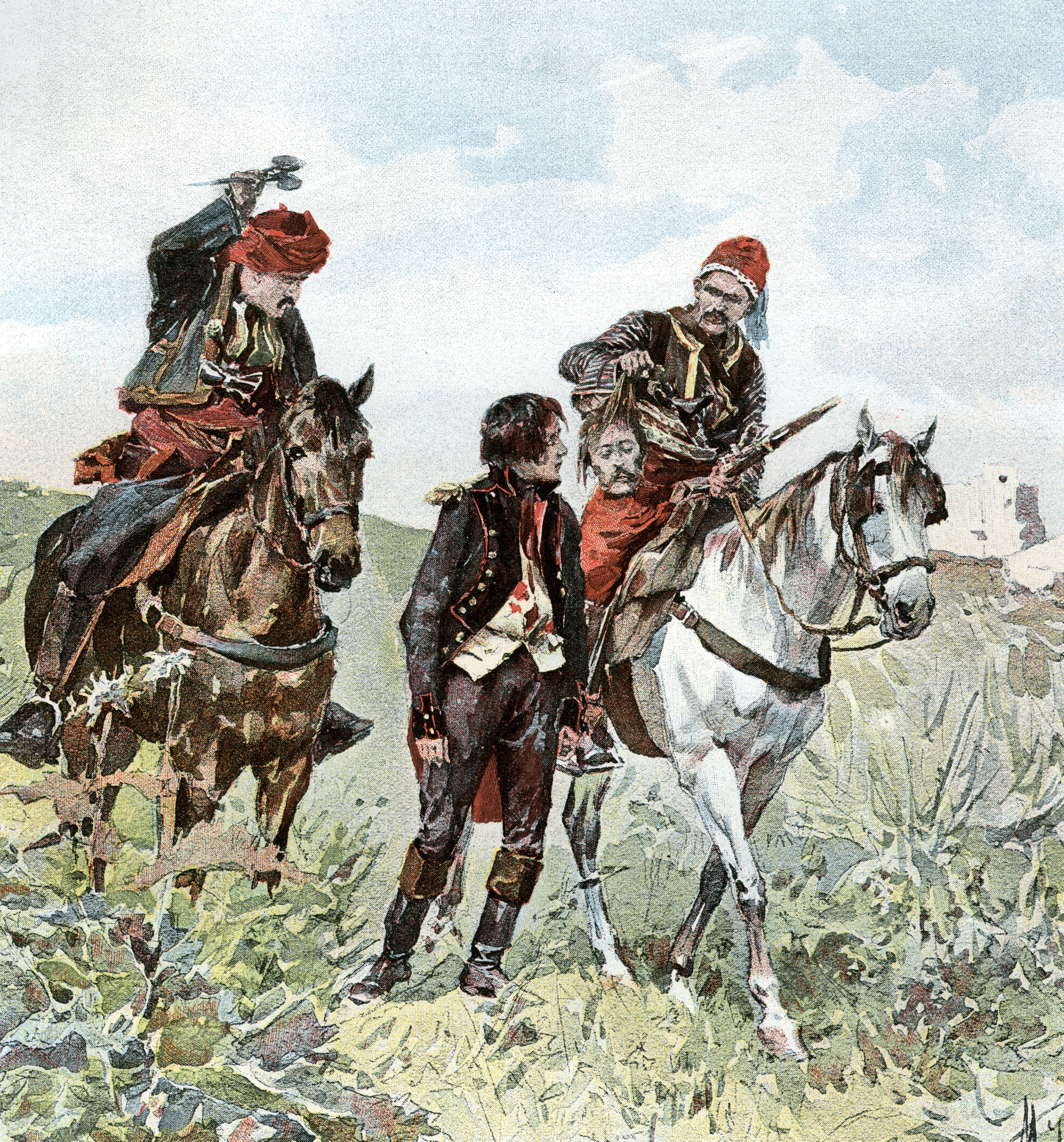
Albanian cavalry showing a French soldier's head to Richemont

After capturing Preveza, Ali had the pro-French inhabitants publicly executed before burning the town. Using the unsuspecting metropolitan bishop of Arta, Ali then lured the Prevezans who had fled to Aktion to return by promising amnesty, and had them too beheaded. Vonitsa surrendered soon after the fall of Preveza, and only Parga managed to resist Ali's forces. Preveza remained in Ali's hands until 1800, when the Ionian Islands were converted into a Russo-Ottoman condominium known as the Septinsular Republic. Under the terms of the 1800 Treaty of Constantinople Preveza and the other mainland exclaves of the Ionian Islands came under direct Ottoman rule. Following the outbreak of the Russo-Turkish War of 1806–1812, Ali once again occupied the town and placed it under the governorship of his son, Veli Pasha. This lasted until Selim III turned against Ali in 1820. The last period of Ottoman rule lasted from 1820 until 1912, when Preveza was captured by the Kingdom of Greece in the First Balkan War.

La Salcette, seven officers and 149 enlisted men were taken prisoner. They were subjected to torture and paraded through the streets of Yanina before being sent on to Constantinople as a token of Ali's loyalty to Selim III. Several of the prisoners, including La Salcette, Richemont and Tissot, were later imprisoned in the Yedikule Fortress in Constantinople. There they met other French prisoners, including the former chief engineer in the Ionian Islands, Joseph Sécret Pascal-Vallongue, and the diplomat and writer François Pouqueville, who wrote on the battle based on conversations with these eyewitnesses. Many prisoners died in Ottoman captivity, with the remainder set free in 1801.

== Sources ==
- Baeyens, Jacques (1973). Les Français à Corfou, 1797–1799 et 1807–1814 [The French in Corfu, 1797–1799 and 1807–1814] (in French). Athens: Institut français d'Athènes. OCLC 2763024.
- Curlin, James S. (2010). «Remember the Moment when Previsa fell»: The 1798 Battle of Nicopolis and Preveza. Preveza B: Proceedings of the Second International Symposium for the History and Culture of Preveza (16–20 September 2009). Vol. I. Preveza: University of Ioannina, Municipality of Preveza, Actia Nicopolis Foundation. pp. 265–296. ISBN 978-960-99475-1-0.
- Fleming, Katherine Elizabeth (1999). The Muslim Bonaparte: Diplomacy and Orientalism in Ali Pasha's Greece. Princeton University Press. ISBN 978-0-69100194-4.
- Moschonas, Nikolaos (1975). "Τα Ιόνια Νησιά κατά την περίοδο 1797–1821" [The Ionian Islands in the period 1797–1821]. In Christopoulos, Georgios A. & Bastias, Ioannis K. (eds.). Ιστορία του Ελληνικού Έθνους [History of the Greek Nation] (in Greek). Vol. ΙΑ: Ο Ελληνισμός υπό ξένη κυριαρχία (περίοδος 1669 - 1821), Τουρκοκρατία - Λατινοκρατία [Hellenism under Foreign Rule (Period 1669 - 1821), Turkocracy – Latinocracy]. Athens: Ekdotiki Athinon. pp. 382–402. ISBN 978-960-213-100-8.
- Phourikis, Petros A. (1929). "Νικόπολις–Πρέβεζα, Β′ Πρέβεζα" [Nicopolis–Preveza, II. Preveza]. Ηπειρωτικά Χρονικά (in Greek). 4. Ioannina: 263–294. ISSN 1108-4758.
