= Kitsos Tzavelas =

Prime Minister of Greece

- Κίτσος Τζαβέλας; Kiço Xhavella
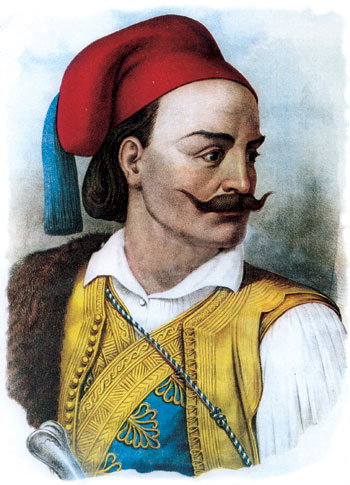
- Portrait of Kitsos Tzavelas

Prime Minister of Greece
- In office 5 September 1847 – 4 March 1848
- Monarch: Otto
- Preceded by: Ioannis Kolettis
- Succeeded by: Georgios Kountouriotis

Minister of Military Affairs
- In office 1844, 1849
- Monarch: Otto
- Prime Minister: Ioannis Kolettis; Konstantinos Kanaris

Personal details
- Born: 1800 or 1801 Souli, Pashalik of Yanina, Ottoman Empire (now Greece)
- Died: 21 March 1855 Athens, Kingdom of Greece
- Resting place: First Cemetery of Athens (Section 2)
- Party: Russian Party
- Spouse: Vasiliki Tzavela
- Relations: Lambros Tzavelas (grandfather); Moscho Tzavela (grandmother); Zigouris Tzavelas (brother); Georgios Tzavelas (brother); Photini Tzavela (sister); Nikolaos Tzavelas; Kostas Tzavelas; Ioannis Kolokotronis (brother-in-law)
- Parent(s): Fotos Tzavelas (father); Despo Tzavela (mother)
- Occupation: Revolutionary; Soldier; Politician
- Nickname(s): Kitsos; Κίτσος; Kiço

Military service
- Allegiance: First Hellenic Republic; Kingdom of Greece
- Branch/service: Hellenic Army
- Rank: General
- Battles/wars: Greek War of Independence; First Siege of Missolonghi; Battle of Karpenisi; Second Siege of Missolonghi; Third Siege of Missolonghi; Crimean War; Epirus Revolt of 1854

Kitsos Tzavelas (Greek: Κίτσος Τζαβέλας; 1800–1855) was a Souliot fighter and general of the Greek rebels in the Greek War of Independence. After the establishment of the Kingdom of Greece he entered Greek politics and served as Minister of Military Affairs (1847-1848) and as Prime Minister (1847).

== Early years and Greek War of Independence ==
Tzavelas was born in Souli, Epirus, Ottoman Empire in 1800, to the Souliot Tzavelas clan (Greek: Τζαβελαίοι Tzavelaioi, Albanian: Xhavella). He was the son of Fotos Tzavelas and grandson of Lambros Tzavelas, both famous for their roles in the Souliot struggles against Ali Pasha, the Pasha of Yanina. Tzavelas grew up in exile in Corfu, the likely location of where he learned Greek, his mother tongue being the Souliotic dialect of Albanian. As such, he was known by his Albanian name, Kiço Xhavella (IPA: [ˈkitʃo dʒaˈveɫa]).

Upon his return to mainland Greece in 1822, he became the head of his family and fara (minor Albanian clan). He settled his clan in Missolonghi. He was initially under the patronage of Georgios Karaiskakis at the beginning of the Greek War of Independence, but would switch to the faction of Alexandros Mavrokordatos when Karaiskakis was implicated in secret negotiations with the Ottomans. However, this did not aid them in their rivalry with the fellow Souliot Botsaris clan, as the latter were favoured due to having prior membership in the faction. After plundering Agrafa (which was held by Karaiskakis' revolutionary faction) on the orders of Mavrokordatos, the Tzavelas clan rejoined Karaiskakis and abandoned Mavrokordatos due to him designating Markos Botsaris "General of Western Greece". The two clans had a very deep hostility to each other that, throughout the war, they supported opposing factions and refused to fight under the same command.

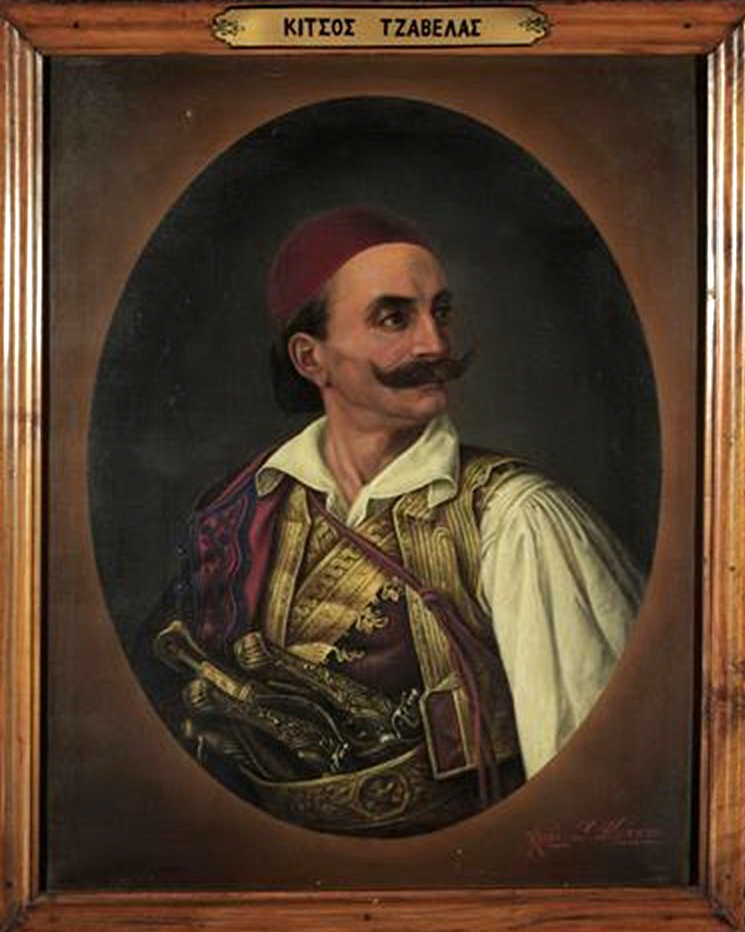
A painting of Kitsos Tzavelas by Themistoklis Drakos, National Historical Museum, Athens

When Ibrahim Pasha invaded the Peloponnese in 1825, Tzavellas, together with Kitsos Botsaris and Georgios Karaiskakis were among the Greek leaders to advance in Messenia and succeeded to relieve the siege of Navarino.

In his speech to the Third National Council of the provisional Greek government in 1826, Tzavelas stressed the sacrifice of the Souliotes for a common fatherland. In 1827, Tzavelas had campaigned successfully in central Rumeli, and would eventually recapture Karpenisi on December 15.

The fact that Tzavelas and the other Souliot leaders gradually integrated in the Greek national cause was noticed by, and perhaps amused, their contemporaries such as the embittered Ahmet Nepravistha, the dervenaga of Kravara, who in a letter of September 1828 replying to Tzavellas's request to surrender, took note of their mutation, and pointing out their shared Albanian origin sarcastically called into question Tzavellas' Greekness. After defeating him next month, in October 1828, Tzavellas had Ahmet's and his men's foreheads stigmatized with the Phoenix; the emblem of the First Hellenic Republic.

== Post-Independence ==
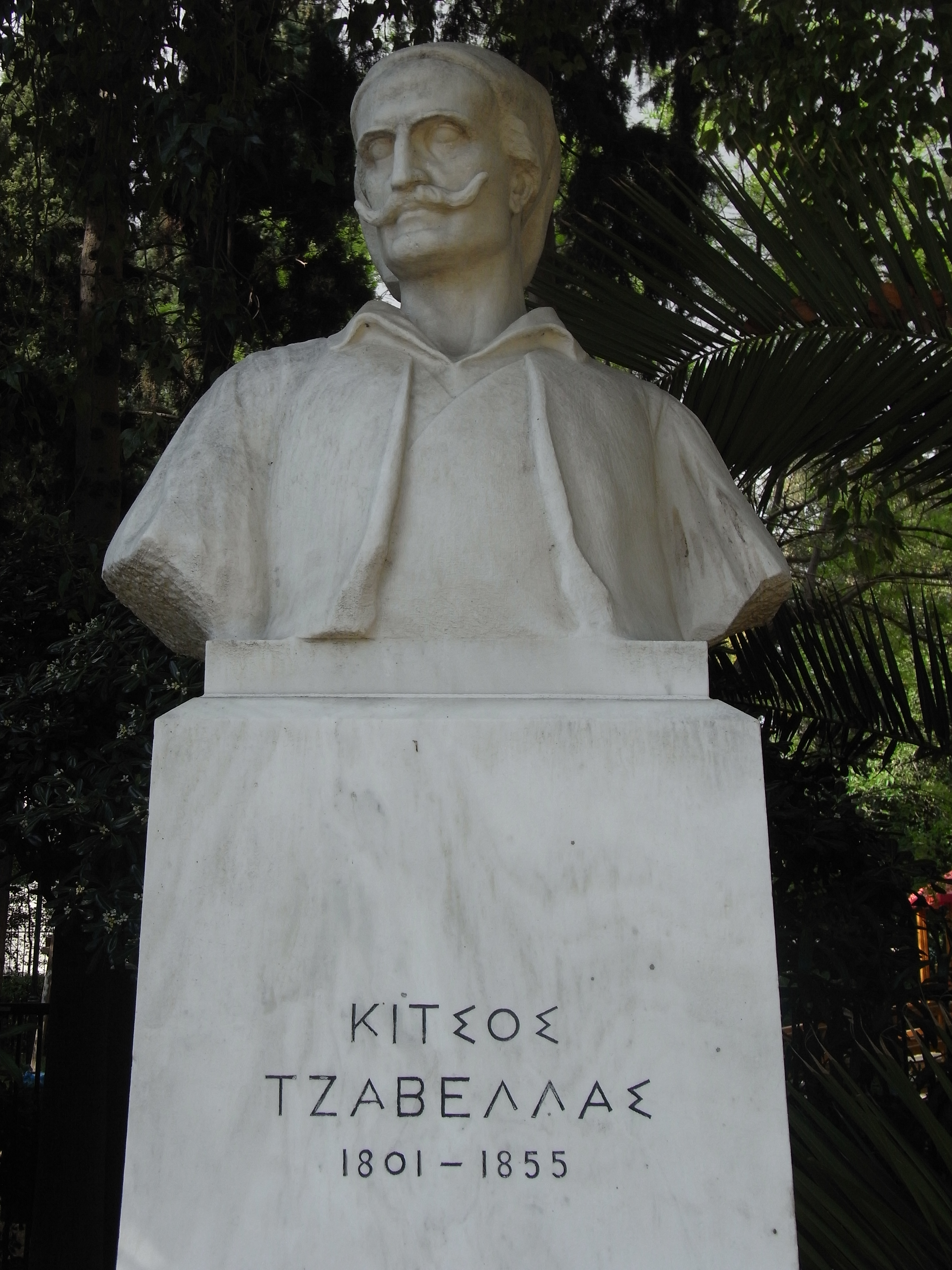
Bust in Pedion tou Areos.

At the Fifth National Assembly at Nafplion (late 1831 – early 1832) the Souliotes were represented by Kitsos Tzavelas and Ioannis Bairaktaris. After many debates and requests by Souliotes to be given land, the delegates of the assembly agreed to give land only to Souliotes who fought in the war and to allow them to build their settlements in limited properties in Nafpaktos and Agrinio.

After Independence, Tzavelas became a supporter of Kapodistrias and eventually a leader in the Russian Party which was the conservative and arch-Orthodox political faction in the period of King Otto. Accused of planning a revolt against the king in 1834, Tzavelas was imprisoned by the Regency Council along with other politicians of the Russian Party. When King Otto came of age and took over the reins of government, Tzavelas was released and later was named aide-de-camp to the king. Otto gave a large area of forest near Missolonghi to Tzavelas.

He was subsequently appointed Minister of Military Affairs in 1844 and, in 1847-1848, Prime Minister. In 1854, during the Crimean War, a number of Greek military officers of Souliote descent, under Kitsos Tzavelas, participated in a failed revolt in Epirus, demanding union with Greece.

Kitsos Tzavelas died in Athens on 21 March 1855, leaving behind his wife Vasiliki Tzavela.

He is buried in the First Cemetery of Athens, next to the plot of Ioannis Kolettis.

== See also ==
- Greek War of Independence
- List of prime ministers of Greece

== Sources ==
- John A. Petropulos; Politics and Statecraft in the Kingdom of Greece; Princeton University Press, 1968
- Tsiamalos, Demetrios (2007). Social and revolutionary awareness of the armed cohorts of Roumeli during the 1821 revolution (Thesis). University of Panteion. doi:10.12681/eadd/16242. hdl:10442/hedi/16242.
- Kostavasilis, Konstantinos (2002). Installations of refuges from Epirus and Thessaly in independent Greece 1832-1862 [Εγκαταστάσεις Ηπειρωτών και Θεσσαλών προσφύγων στο ελεύθερο κράτος 1832-1862] (PDF) (Thesis). University of Ioannina. doi:10.12681/eadd/23070.
- Ψιμούλη, Βάσω (2021). "Σουλιώτες: από ανυπότακτοι ορεσίβιοι, μαχητές της Ελληνικής Επανάστασης B' μέρος". The Books' Journal (124): 34–40.

Preceded by Ioannis Kolettis	Prime Minister of Greece; 5 September 1847 – 4 March 1848	Succeeded by Georgios Kountouriotis
