= Photini Tzavela =

Greek Lady-in-Waiting at the royal court of King Otto (1809/11–1890)

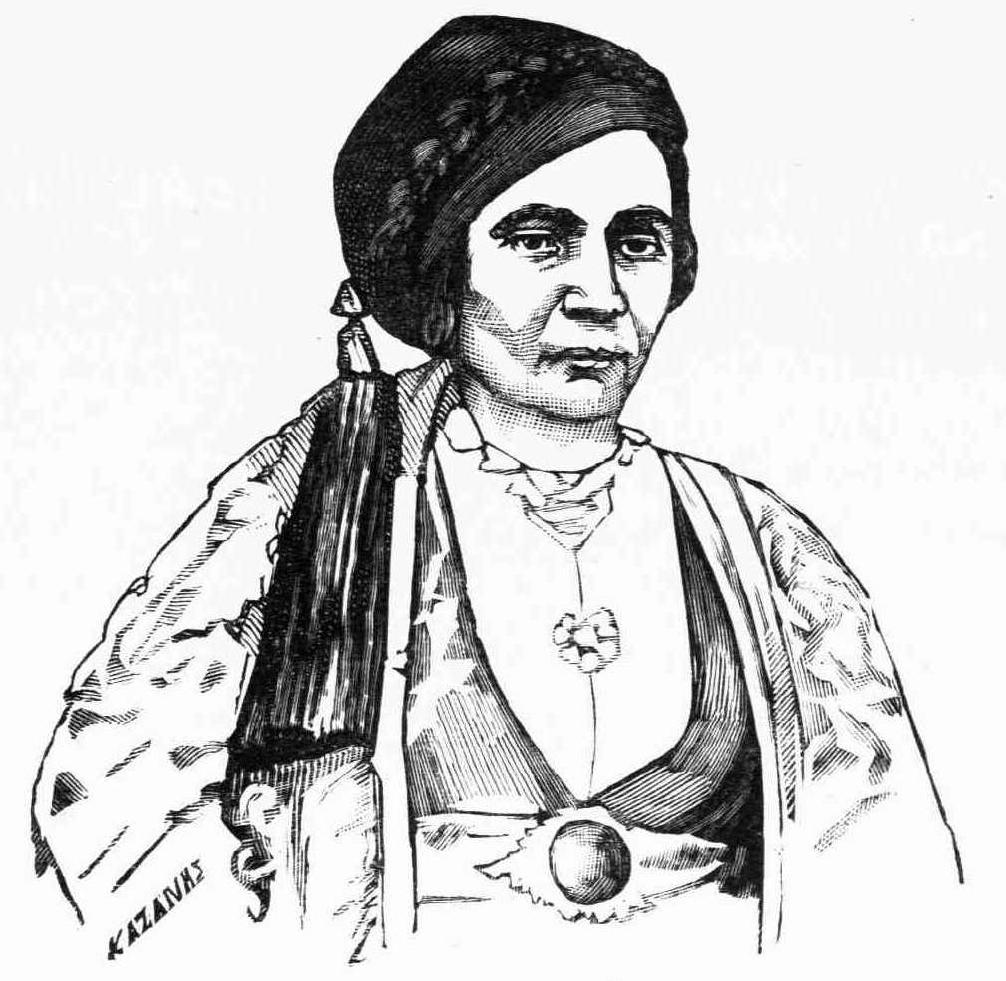
Photini Kolokotroni.

Photini Kolokotroni–Tzavela (Greek: Φωτεινή Κολοκοτρώνη - Τζαβέλα; 1809/11 in Corfu – 1890 in Athens) served as Lady-in-Waiting at the royal court of King Otto. She was the daughter of the chieftain Fotos Tzavelas, sister of Kitsos Tzavelas, prime minister of Greece, wife of Gennaios Kolokotronis, also prime minister and mother of the journalist Theodoros (alias Phalez) Kolokotronis.

== Biography ==
She was born in Corfu on November 12, 1809 or, according to another theory, on September 27, 1811, daughter of the Souliote chieftain Fotos Tzavelas and sister of the Greek War of Independence fighter and later prime minister of Greece, Kitsos Tzavelas. It is said that on the day when she was born, her father was poisoned by Ali Pasha’s agents and she therefore took her name from him. In 1820 she returned together with her family and the rest of the Souliotes in Souli, but in September 1822 she again had to flee, this time to Missolonghi.

After the Fall of Missolonghi, in 1827 she found refuge in Nafplio. She there married, during the next year, to Theodoros Kolokotronis’s son Gennaios. Among the wedding gifts she received, were a pair of bracelets, offered by Ioannis Kapodistrias, governor of Greece. This marriage signalled among other things the political alliance between the Tzavelas and Kolokotronis clans.

During the reign of King Otto, Photini Kolokotroni became lady in waiting at the royal court and a personal councillor to Queen Amalia. With Ioannis Kolokotronis she had seven children: two sons, Theodoros (alias Phalez) and Konstantinos, as well as five daughters, Georgitsa Petimeza, Aikaterini Rodiou, Eleni Zotou, Zoitsa Manotou and Efrosyni, who remained unmarried.

She died in Athens on September 26, 1890 after a long and painful disease. Her funeral took place on the next day in the church of Agios Georgios in Athens.

== Bibliography ==
- Mark Mazower (ed.), Networks of Power in modern Greece – Essays in honour of John Campbell, Alexandria publications, 2014.
- Koula Xiradaki, Γυναίκες του ’21 - Προσφορές, ηρωισμοί και θυσίες [Women of ’21 – Services, heroism and sacrifice], Dodoni publications, Athens – Ioannina 1995.
- Poikile Stoa, vol.9, no.1, 1891
