= Franco-Turkish War (1798–1801) =

Ottoman defeat of Revolutionary France

- Part of the War of the Second Coalition
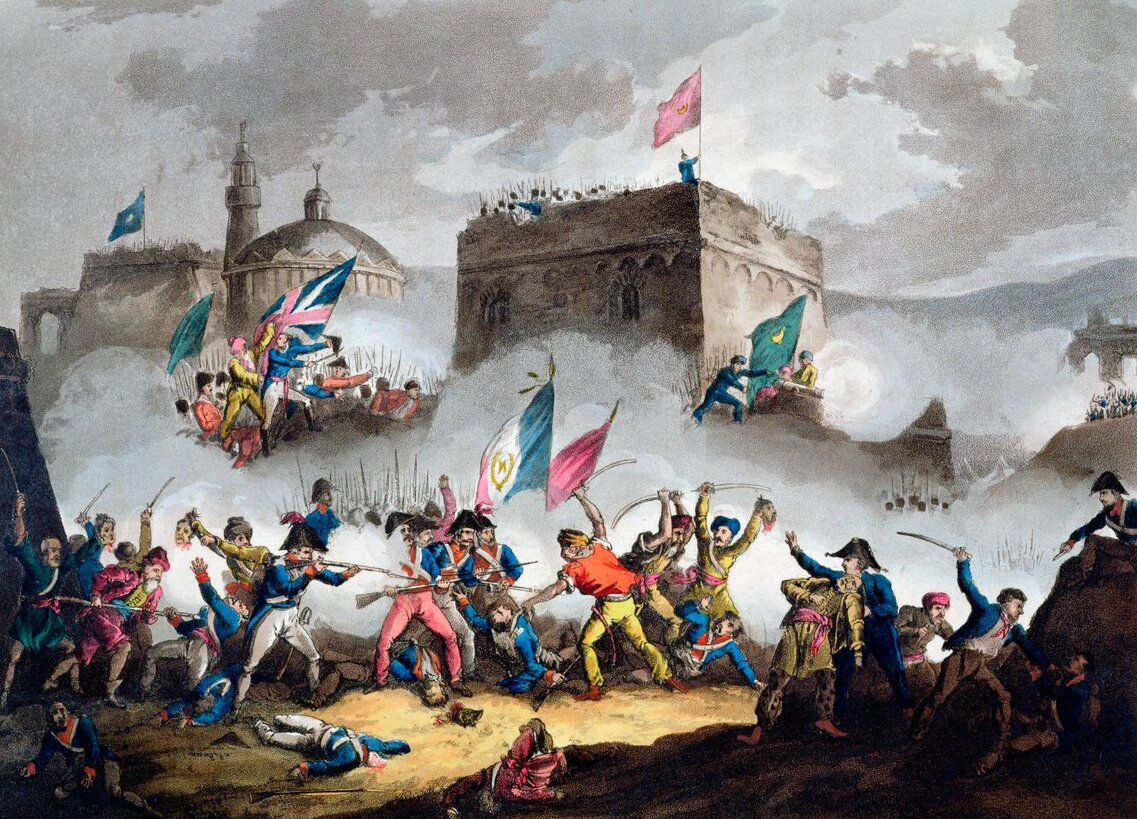
- Siege of Acre (1799)
Date	1798–1801
Location	Ottoman Egypt, Ottoman Syria, Mediterranean Sea
Result	Ottoman victory

Belligerents
Ottoman Empire Ottoman allies: Great Britain (1798–1800); United Kingdom (1801); Russian Empire; Pashalik of Janina	(French First Republic) French Republic

Commanders and leaders
(Ottoman Empire) Selim III (Ottoman Empire) Şehzade Mahmud (Ottoman Empire) Yusuf Pasha (Ottoman Empire) Mustafa Pasha (Ottoman Empire) Jezzar Pasha	(French First Republic) Napoleon Bonaparte (French First Republic) Eugène de Beauharnais (French First Republic) Jean-Baptiste Kléber (French First Republic) Jean-Antoine Verdier (French First Republic) Joachim Murat

Strength
Egypt–Syria: 220,000 Ionian Islands: 6,200–8,000	Egypt–Syria: 35,000–40,000 Ionian Islands: 3,700–4,000

Casualties and losses
Egypt–Syria: 65,000 Ionian Islands: 300–400	Egypt–Syria: 38,500 Ionian Islands: 700–1,000

The Franco-Turkish War (1798–1801) was a conflict between Revolutionary France and the Ottoman Empire, forming a part of the wider French Revolutionary Wars. It began with the French invasion of Egypt under Napoleon Bonaparte but lasted until 1802. Its other fronts included Palestine, Syria, Albania, the Ionian Islands, Sicily and mainland Italy. The Ottomans also allied themselves with the Russian Empire and Great Britain.

== Course ==
=== France attacks Egypt (1798) ===
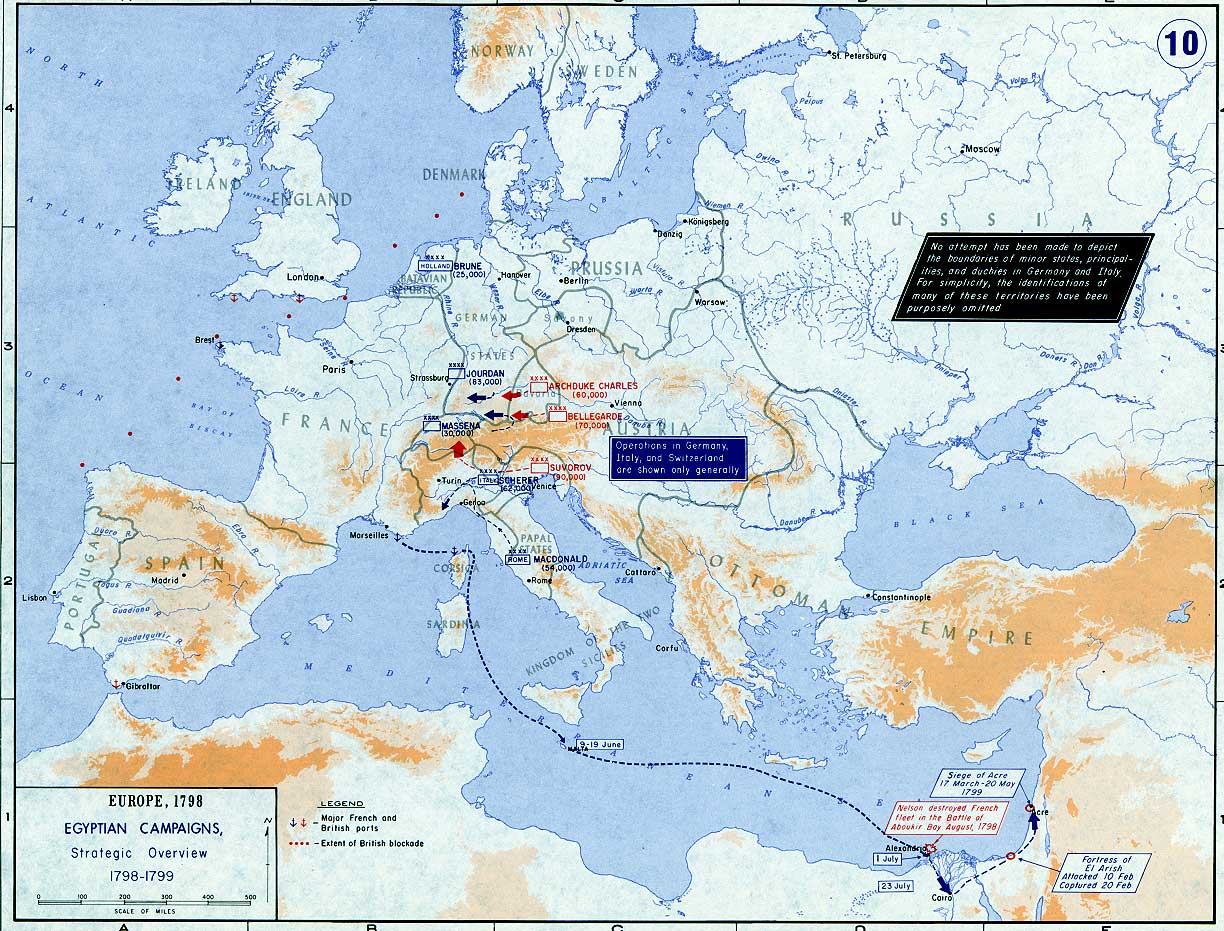
Bonaparte's 1798 campaigns.

Bonaparte conquered northern Italy in 1796-1797 on behalf of the French Directory. He secured these territorial gains with the Treaty of Campo Formio, signed on 18 October 1797 with the Holy Roman Empire. This also abolished the Republic of Venice, with France annexing its territories of Dalmatia, the Ionian Islands, Parga, Preveza, Butrint, and Narda along the eastern Adriatic coast and thus gaining land borders with the Ottoman Empire.

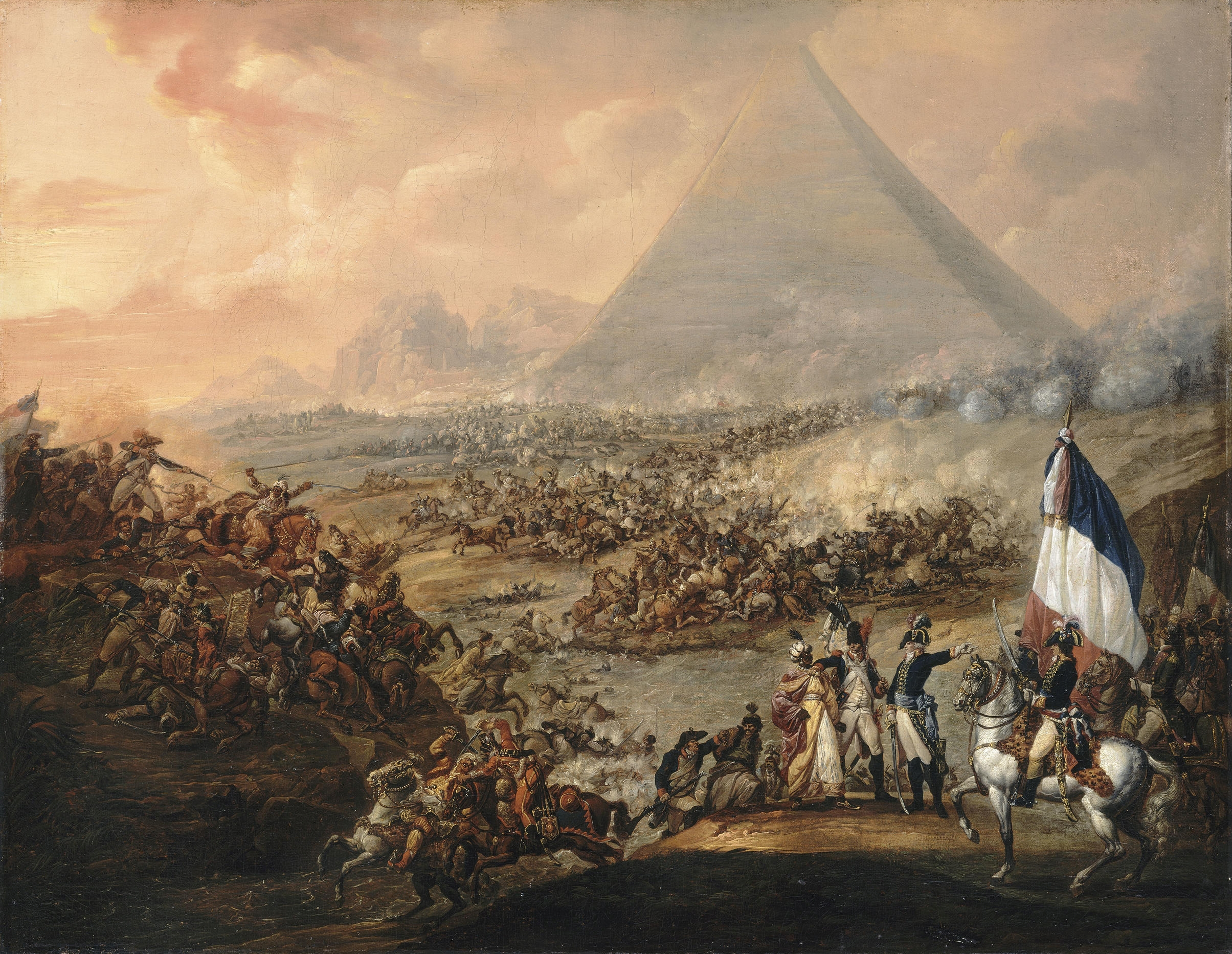
The Battle of the Pyramids

Bonaparte returned to France in 1797 after signing the Treaty. Although the French Directory proposed the invasion of Great Britain in February 1798, Napoleon Bonaparte suggested that a more realistic enterprise might be invading the Ottoman province of Egypt to block British access to India. This was also on the advice of the French foreign minister Charles Maurice de Talleyrand-Périgord who believed that such an invasion could also enable France to send aid via Suez to Tipu Sultan, an enemy of the British in India.

To this end 13 ships of the line, 14 frigates, 40,000 soldiers, and 10,000 sailors were assembled in Toulon. To avoid an attack by the British Mediterranean Fleet under Admiral Horatio Nelson, the expedition's objective was kept secret. The French fleet departed Toulon under Bonaparte's command on 19 May 1798, and occupied Malta between June 10-12. After leaving Malta, the fleet reached the Egyptian coast and landed in Alexandria on 1 July 1798. That city had been evacuated and so the French occupied it before setting off on 19 July into the interior. On 21 July they defeated the weak Mamluk cavalry of the Egyptian provincial army in the Battle of the Pyramids and occupied Cairo later the same day.

Despite these successes on land, the French suffered a defeat at sea. A fleet under Nelson, sailing in the Eastern Mediterranean, arrived in Alexandria before the French fleet, but the Empire rejected its offer to anchor there. After the French navy landed in Alexandria, they anchored their transport ships, frigates, and small warships in Alexandria harbour, while their larger ships (23 vessels) were anchored off the Abu Hur fortress. In the Battle of the Nile, which took place between the British and French navies on 1-2 August 1798, the British almost annihilated the French fleet.

In response to this victory, Ottoman Sultan Selim III sent Admiral Nelson a diamond-encrusted aigrette and his soldiers 2,000 gold coins as gifts. As a result of the loss of their main fleet, the French army, just a week after their landing at Alexandria, was left stranded on land without naval support, though they did manage to repress the Cairo Revolt on 20-22 October, resulting in the deaths of 2,000 French and 5,000 Egyptians.

=== Albania and the Adriatic (1798) ===
News of the invasion reached Istanbul on 27 July through reports from Ottoman officials on Rhodes, an unexpected attack given that the Empire had had a treaty and good relations with France since 1536. Between 30 July and 2 August the Empire sent orders to its provinces of Egypt, Palestine and Syria before on 2 August declaring war on France. Cezzar Ahmed Paşa, Ottoman governor of Palestine, refused Bonaparte's letter of 28 August.

On 28 July the Empire also opened negotiations with two of France's enemies, the Russian Empire and Great Britain. They granted permission for fourteen Russian naval ships to anchor off Büyükdere on 5 September 1798. Finally, on 23 December 1798, the first alliance in history between the Ottoman Empire and the Russian Empire was signed in Istanbul, followed by an alliance signed with Great Britain on 5 January 1799.

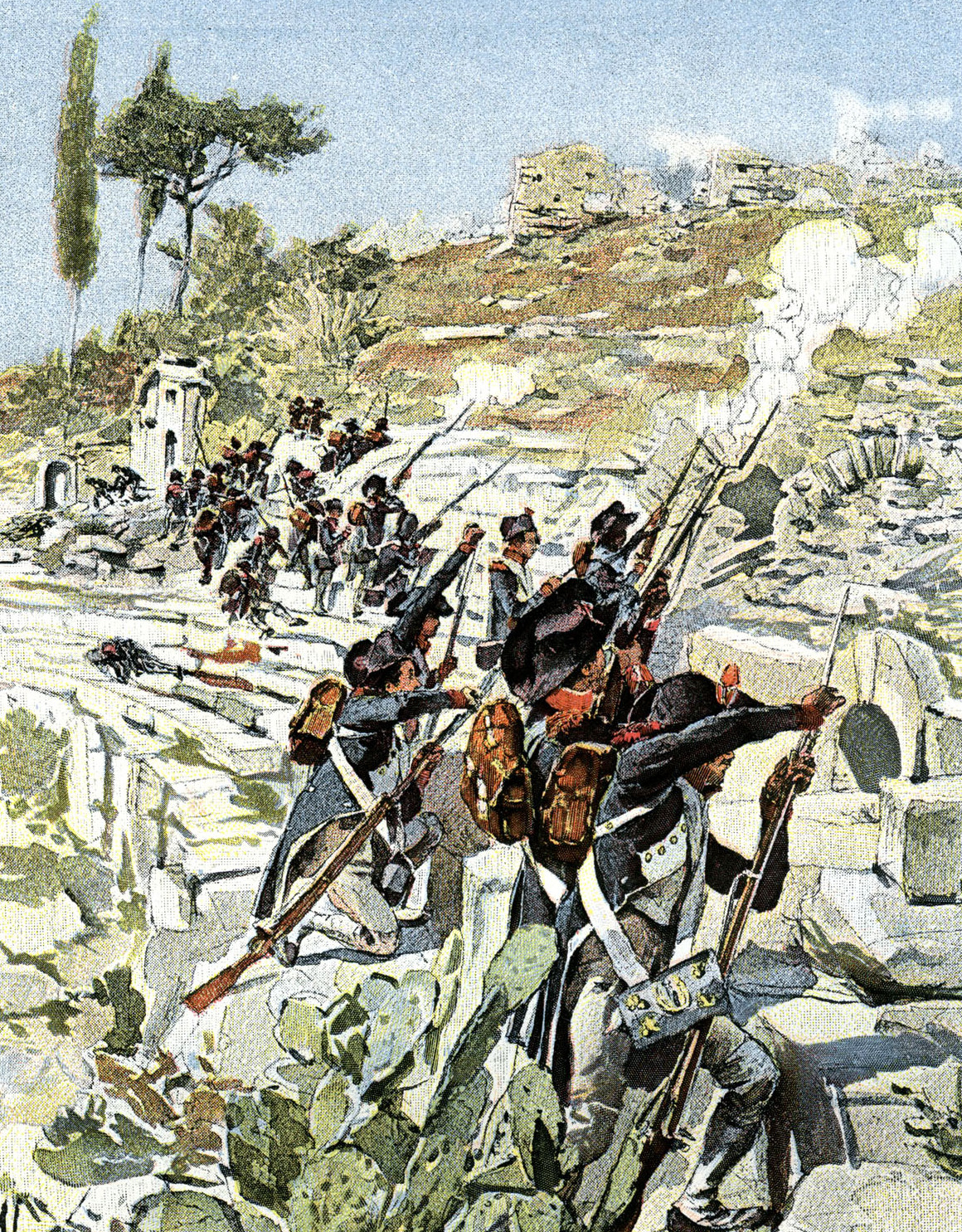
The Battle of Nicopolis

France had taken over the four mainland ports of Butrinto, Preveza, Vonitsa, and Parga from the extinct Republic of Venice after the Treaty of Campo Formio. The Sultan ordered Ali Pasha, governor of Ioannina, to capture all four for the Empire. In October 1798 Ali Pasha's troops captured all but Parga, which also surrendered on hearing of the arrival of a joint Ottoman-Russian fleet. This completely eliminated the French presence on the Albanian mainland.

The Russian Navy set off from Büyükdere on 19 September and joined up with the Ottoman fleet under the command of Mehmed Kadir Pasha (Kadir Bey) in Çanakkale on September 25. The joint force left the Dardanelles on 1 October and reached Kythira eight days later. They captured the Kapsali fortress from its French garrison. From there the Ottoman-Russian fleet headed towards the Ionian Islands which France had taken over from the Venetian Republic, capturing Zante on 25 October, Kefalonia on 3 November, and Lefkada (Ayamavra) on 14 November after a fifteen day siege. The last two small islands in the region, Ithaca and Paxos, surrendered in mid-November.

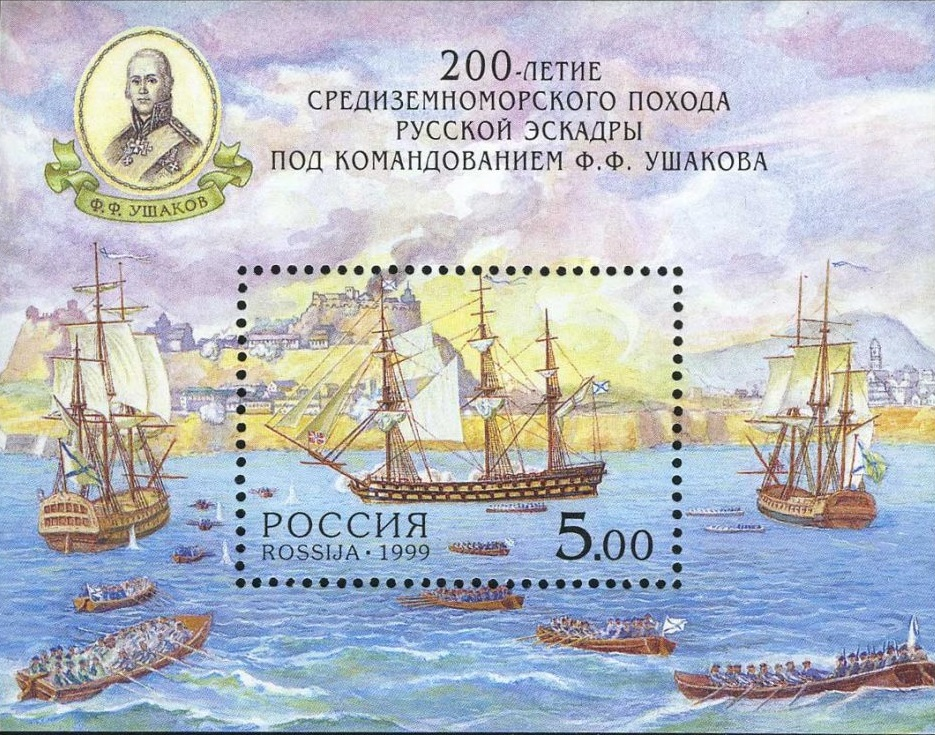
Commemorative stamp issued in Russia on the occasion of the 200th anniversary of the Siege of Corfu.

The Ottoman-Russian fleet then turned towards Corfu, which had the largest French garrison (3,000 soldiers and 630 cannons), and besieged the main fortress. However, due to the strong resistance of the garrison, the fortress's fortified position, the small number of besieging troops, and the winter conditions, the siege came to a halt in late 1798. With the signing of the Ottoman-Russian Alliance Treaty (1799) on 3 January 1799, additional warships were sent to the waters of Corfu. Ali Pasha had successfully completed his operations in Albania and part of his force also landed on Corfu. The offensive resumed on 1 March 1799 and the French garrison finally surrendered on 3 March after suffering heavy losses.

=== Italy (1799) ===
Having achieved a decisive victory in the Ionian Islands, the Ottoman-Russian fleet targeted the French presence in Italy. The Kingdom of Naples signed a defensive pact with Austria on 19 May 1798, joining the Second Coalition against France, and also pacts with the Russian Empire (29 November 1798), Great Britain (1 December 1798) and the Ottomans (21 January 1799). France captured all the kingdom's territories on the Italian mainland and converted them into the Parthenopean Republic, a French satellite state. Ferdinand IV of Naples took refuge on Sicily and successfully requested military support from Russia then from the Ottomans.

In accordance with orders from Istanbul dated 29 April 1799, Kadir Bey dispatched seven Ottoman and two Russian ships to Otranto and Brindisi. It captured Brindisi on 17 April and seized Bari, Barletta and Manfredonia between 4 and 19 May. Advancing inland from the coast with reinforcements, the Ottoman-Russian force captured Foggia on 21 May and - after joining forces with Neapolitan rebels at Ariano on June 5 and with assistance from the Royal Navy under Nelson - besieged and captured Naples on 22 June.

At the same time five Ottoman and six Russian ships began besieging Ancona, which the French were using as a base, on 14 May. They then captured Pesaro, Fano and Senigallia to the north from 10 to 18 June. Consolidating its presence on these coasts in July against a French counterattack, the Ottoman-Russian fleet tightened the siege of Ancona on August 12th. With an Austrian corps under General Frölich also attacking from the land, Ancona finally surrendered on 13 November 1799.

Meanwhile, the Ottoman-Russian fleet that had left Corfu on 4 August anchored in Messina on 14 August and then in Palermo, but left the region to return to the Dardanelles in September. With the arrival of the ships returning from Ancona at the end of November, the Ottoman fleet returned to its bases after more than a year of operations.

=== Egypt and the Levant ===
==== 1799 ====
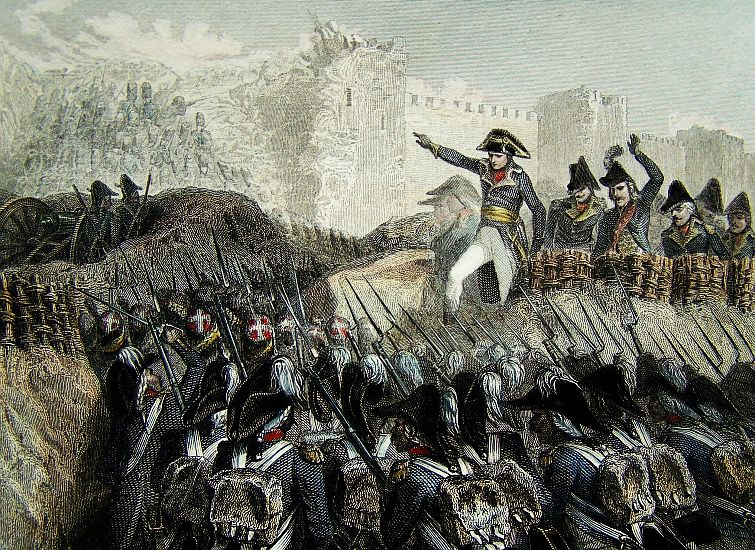
Bonaparte's unsuccessful siege of Acre.

With his fleet largely destroyed, Bonaparte was in a difficult situation in Egypt and - when his envoy to the Sultan was captured by the British - he turned his attentions to Palestine. He set out from Egypt on 22 December 1798 with around 25,000 men, arrived before the fortress of El-Arish on 7 February and captured it on 20 February. Continuing its advance, the French army occupied Gaza on 25 February and Jaffa on 7 March, massacring 2,500 prisoners in Jaffa. The Ottomans evacuated Haifa and the French occupied it. On 19 March 1799 they arrived before Acre, defended by Cezzar Ahmed Pasha, and besieged it. However, after suffering 7 to 8 thousand casualties in 44 attacks until 20 May against a garrison greatly strengthened by 3,000 Nizam-i Cedid soldiers brought in by the Ottoman navy on May 8, they retreated with difficulty to Cairo.

==== Ottoman landing ====
The victory at Acre laid the groundwork for operations to expel the French from Egypt. 80-100 Ottoman ships under the command of Köse Mustafa Pasha attempted a landing in Alexandria on 16 July 1799 but encountered resistance. In response, with the support of the Royal Navy, 9,000 soldiers were landed at Abukir. In the Battle of Abukir on 25 July, the French army under General Joachim Murat defeated this Ottoman force and subsequently recaptured the Abukir fortress. Although the Ottoman land and sea forces withdrew from Abukir and then landed at Damietta, they were defeated by another French army under Jean-Antoine Verdier, thus losing their offensive capabilities.

Bonaparte learned that the Grand Vizier Kör Yusuf Ziyaüddin Pasha was marching on Egypt with the main Ottoman army. Without a fleet he realised he could not permanently occupy Egypt and began planning his return to France. He made a show of peace negotiations through Köse Mustafa Pasha (who had been captured at Abukir) but escaped to France by secretly boarding a small squadron of three ships on 23 August 1799 and leaving Jean-Baptiste Kléber behind as his deputy.

==== 1799–1800 ====
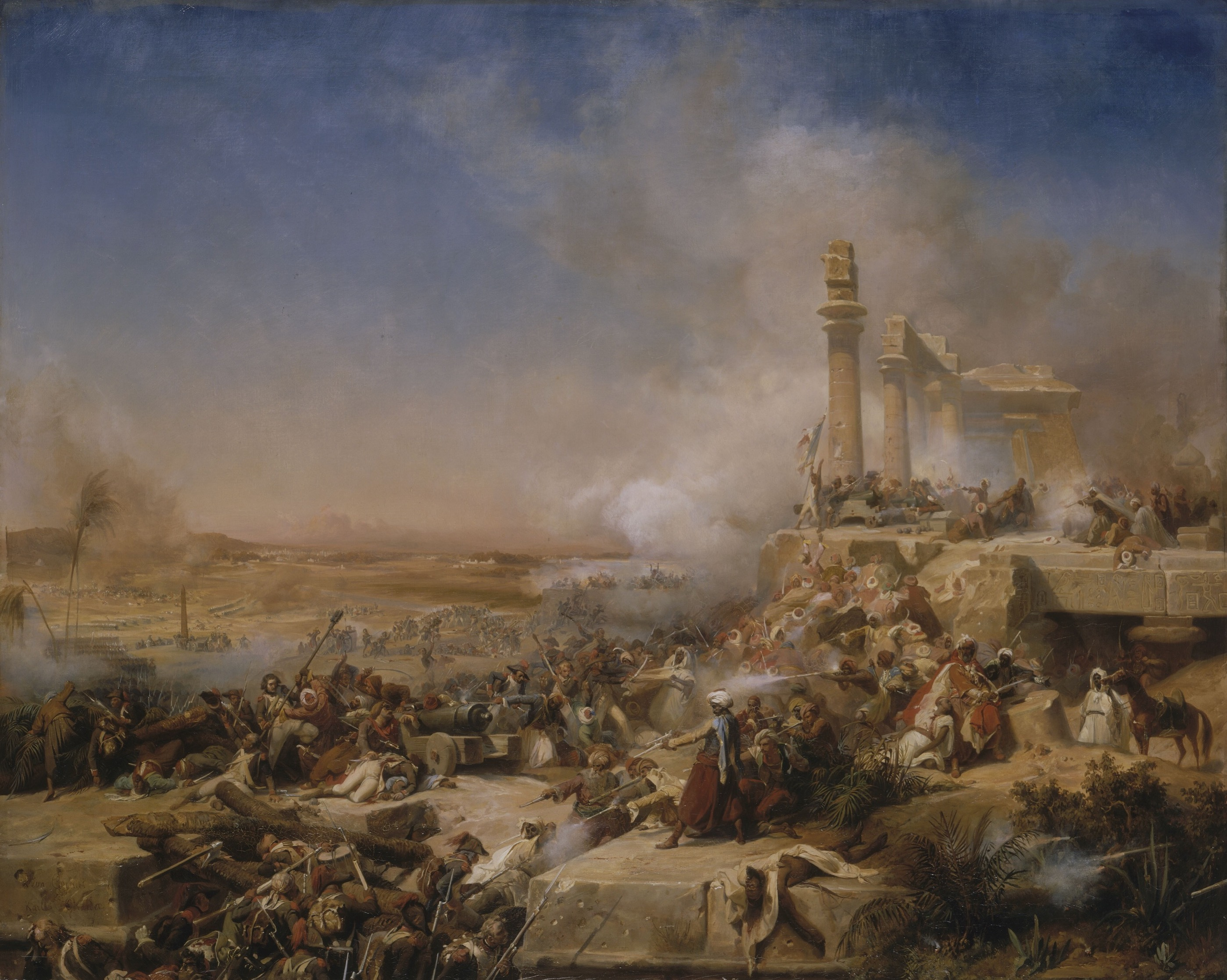
Battle of Heliopolis (20 March 1800)

The 15,000-strong Ottoman army under the command of Yusuf Ziyaüddin Pasha (also known as Blind Yusuf Ziyaüddin Pasha) departed from Üsküdar on 3 June 1799 and arrived in Damascus on 13 September, by which time it had grown to 24,000 soldiers. The French offer to evacuate Egypt through a unilateral agreement with the Ottomans was rejected in accordance with alliance agreements with Russia and Britain. Negotiations, this time involving British Admiral Smith, almost reached an agreement on ceasefire terms, but at the same time the Ottoman army continued its advance. Following the siege of El-Arish on 17-21 December 1799, Yusuf Ziyauddin Pasha's force accepted the armistice terms and signed the Evacuation Agreement on 24 January 1800.

As the Ottoman army moved to take Egypt, leaving behind its baggage and heavy artillery, the French also directed their forces toward Damietta, Rashid, and Alexandria to evacuate Egypt. In accordance with the evacuation agreement, the Ottoman government sent 45 ships to Alexandria to transport the French back to France. However, the British government announced that it did not accept the evacuation agreement, which had been spearheaded by Admiral Smith.

Upon receiving this news, just as Cairo was to be handed over to the Ottoman army on 12 March 1800, General Kléber asked Yusuf Ziya Pasha to halt his march and intercede with the British to persuade them to accept the agreement. Yusuf Ziya Pasha refused to stop his army and demanded that the French board the ships and leave Egypt. Upon this, General Kléber decided to resume fighting. The French army captured El Matareya from the Ottoman forces under the command of Nasuh Pasha and then inflicted a major defeat on the Ottoman army at the Battle of Ain Shams on 20 March 1800. While the Ottoman army retreated to El-Arish, General Kléber returned to Cairo on 27 March.

==== 1800–1801 ====
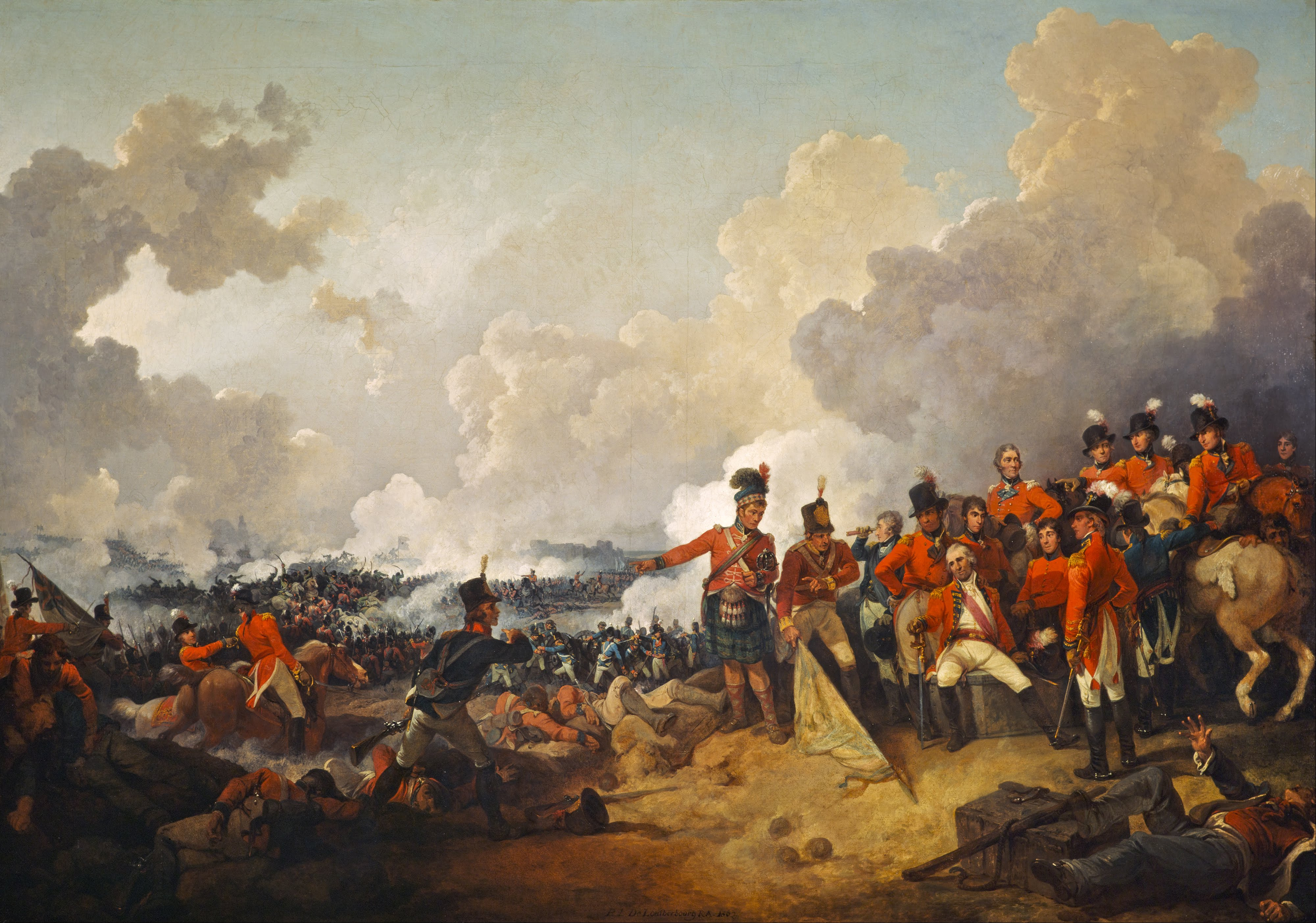
The French Army Surrenders to the British at Alexandria (1801)

In order to force the French army to surrender completely, the Ottoman-British alliance decided on a land and sea offensive in 1801. To this end a 30,000-strong Ottoman army under the command of Grand Vizier Yusuf Ziya Pasha was assembled in Jaffa, while a 6,000-strong Ottoman unit (Nizam-ı Cedid and Albanian soldiers) under the command of Admiral Küçük Hüseyin Pasha and a 24,000-strong British force (composed of British, German, Swiss, Maltese, and Indian soldiers) prepared for the attack. In contrast, France had approximately 30,000 well-trained soldiers in Cairo and Alexandria.

Grand Vizier Yusuf Ziya Pasha set out from Jaffa towards El-Arish on 12 March 1801. Despite the strong fortifications at Salihiye the French force there could not withstand the Ottoman offensive and retreated to Bilbis. It could not hold its ground there either and joined the main army in Cairo. Similarly, the French forces in Suez also retreated to Cairo, fearing that their retreat route might be cut off. Continuing his advance, Yusuf Ziya Pasha inflicted a major defeat on the French army under General Beliard, who came against him from Cairo with 8,000 men, in the Battle of Haneke on 17 May 1801. This Ottoman victory was one of the most important turning points in ending the French presence in Egypt. Upon the defeated French's retreatto Cairo, Yusuf Ziya Pasha sent word to the Ottoman-British force that had landed at Abukir to march on Cairo, while he sent troops under the command of Ibrahim Pasha, the Beylerbey of Aleppo, to capture Damietta.

The British navy arrived at Fethiye in January 1801 and, after departing in early March, reached the waters off Alexandria. However, upon discovering that the French had fortified the port, they landed 5,000 soldiers with cannon at Abukir harbour on 8 March 1801. Although the 500-man French unit defending Abukir was defeated, the 5,000-man French unit sent from Rahmaniye and Alexandria managed to stop the British forces at the Madiye hills.

Then, on 23 March 1801, the Ottoman fleet of 70 ships under the command of Küçük Hüseyin Pasha landed 6,000 soldiers under the command of Kethüda Hüsrev Ağa at Abukir. The Ottoman forces, reinforced by British soldiers, advanced eastward towards Rashid, while the British forces, reinforced by Ottoman soldiers, advanced westward towards Alexandria. These forces repelled the French and blockaded Alexandria.

Simultaneously, the 6,000-strong Ottoman force (reinforced by British troops) under Hüsrev Ağa defeated a 5,000-strong French force on the Miyadiye hills. On 19 April 1801, the Ottoman fleet made another landing at Cape Rashid and, joining forces with the British, besieged Rashid. After a four-day siege, unable to withstand the heavy artillery fire from land and river, the French forces surrendered. Advancing south from Miyadiye, the Ottoman-British force (two British cavalry squadrons, two British infantry regiments, the Süleyman Ağa unit, the Halil Ağa unit, and the Ali Ağa unit) reached the banks of the Nile on 4 May. In the Battle of Rahmaniye on 9 May the French forces were defeated and on the following day the allied forces entered Rahmaniye. Thus, with the French forces in Alexandria under siege and the French forces in Rahmaniye defeated, there was no obstacle left for the Ottoman-British army to advance to Cairo.

On 13 June 1801, Ottoman forces under the command of Hüsrev Ağa, along with the British force, advanced from the west bank of the Nile and established contact with the Ottoman army on the east bank under the command of Grand Vizier Yusuf Ziya Pasha. Indeed, while Yusuf Ziya Pasha was advancing on the French defensive positions north of Cairo, Hüsrev Ağa and British troops captured Inbaba on the same day, besieging Giza. General Beliard, commander of the French army in Cairo, realizing he could not defend the city when surrounded on two sides, convened a committee composed of Ottoman, British, and French representatives to begin ceasefire negotiations. The terms agreed upon on 27 June defined the conditions for the French army's evacuation of Cairo. The evacuation, which began on 9 July, was completed the following day, and the Ottoman army under Yusuf Ziya Pasha entered Cairo on 11 July 1801, ending the three-year French occupation.

Although the Ottoman-British army offered the French army under General Menou, whom they had besieged in Alexandria, the same terms as in Cairo, General Menou, still hoping for French assistance, decided to resist. However, battered by heavy artillery and bombardment, the French army was forced to agree to evacuate the city. On 8 September 1801, the French forces in Alexandria also left the city, and all of Egypt was liberated from French occupation.

== See also ==
- Battle of Beirut (1520)
- Franco-Turkish War (1918–1921)
