= Lambros Tzavelas =

Souliot military leader (1745–1792)

Lambros Tzavelas (Greek: Λάμπρος Τζαβέλας; Albanian: Llambro Xhavella; 1745–1792) was a Souliot leader. He was famous for his role in the Souliot struggles against Ali Pasha, the Pasha of Yanina. Tzavelas was born in Souli.

He was sent to help Ali Pasha to capture Gjirokastër with seventy Souliotes. He was betrayed and his son Foto was captured and held prisoner in Castro castle in Ioannina, while Lambros was let free. Foto was released by Ali Pasha's son, Veli Pasha. He became the leader of the Souliotes following the death of his father. His grandson was Kitsos Tzavelas.
