= Moscho Tzavela =

Greek heroine

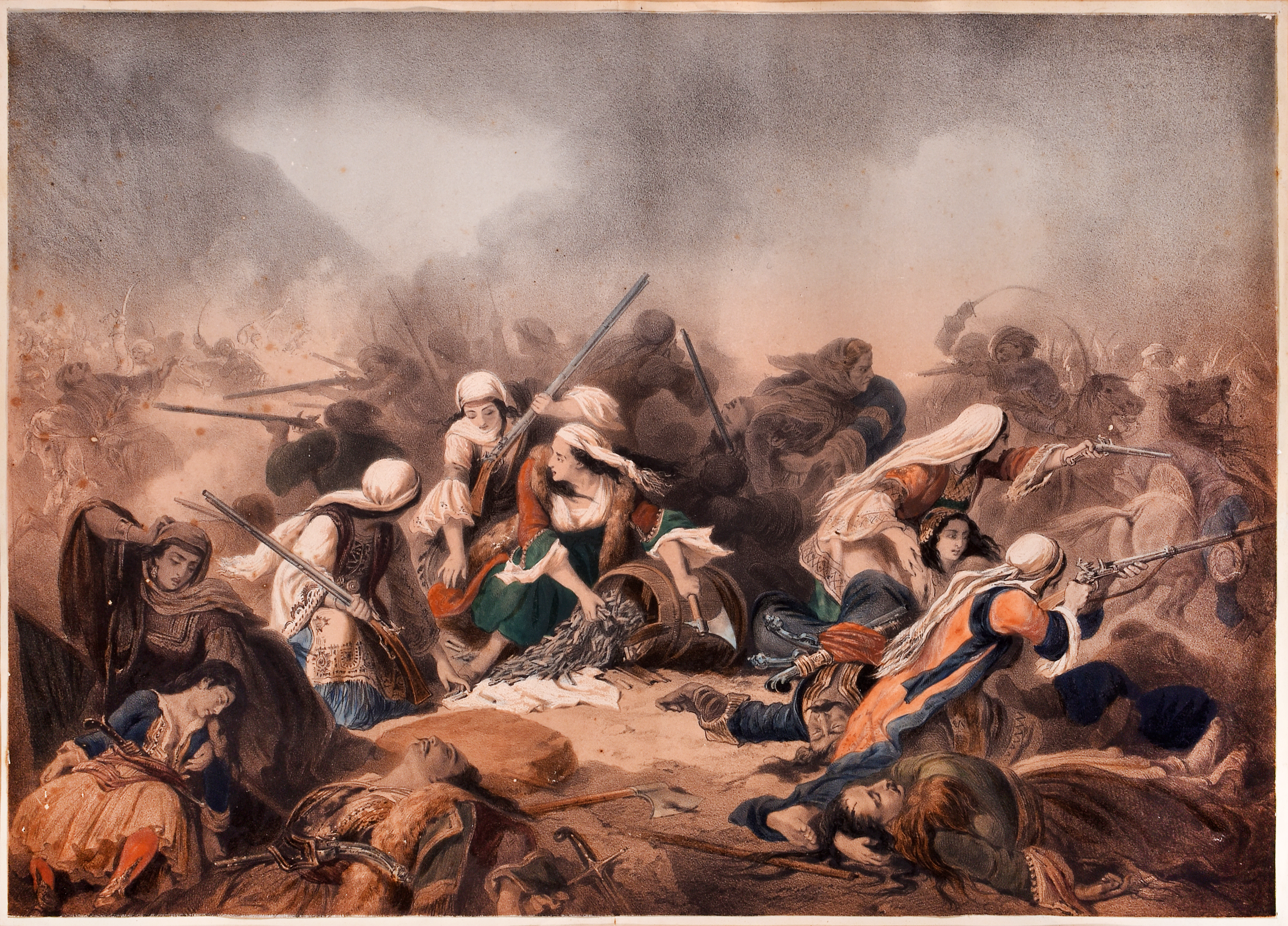
Moscho Tzavela during the battle of Kiafa, July 1792, as drawn by Alphonse de Neuville

Moscho Tzavela (Greek: Μόσχω Τζαβέλα; c. 1760–1803) was a Souliote woman who lived in the years before the outbreak of the Greek War of Independence, she has been extensively mentioned in modern Greek literature.

Moscho Tzavela was a descendant of a long line of Greek guerilla fighters.
