= Yanina–Ottoman War =

1820 conflict

Yanina-Ottoman War
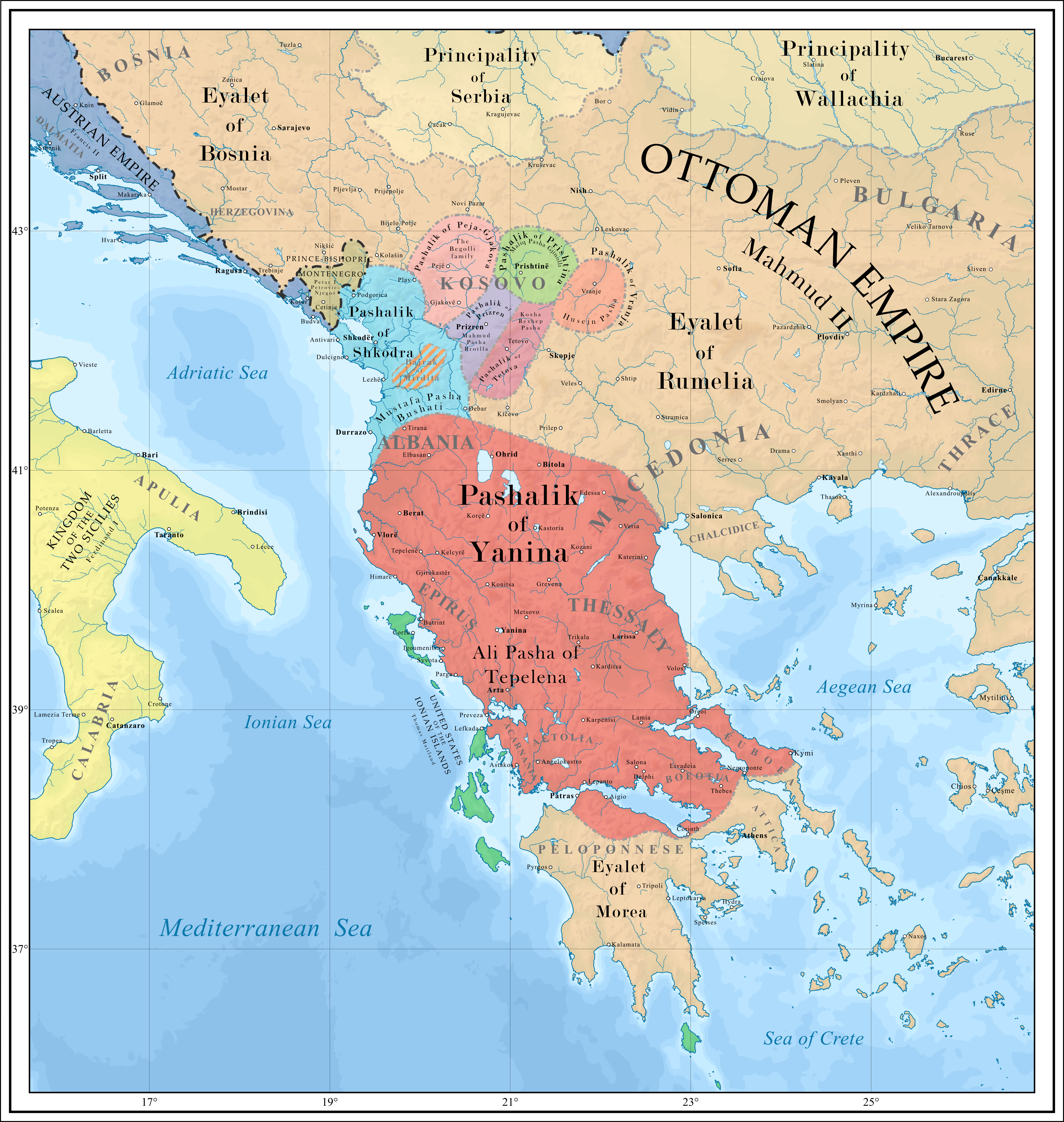
- Territory of the Pashalik of Yanina (in red) from 1815 to 1821
Date	April 1820 – 24 January 1822
Location	Pashalik of Yanina, Morea Eyalet (modern-day Greece)
Result	Ottoman victory

Belligerents
Pashalik of Yanina; Greek revolutionaries	Ottoman Empire; Pashalik of Scutari

Commanders and leaders
Ali Pasha of Ioannina †/ (executed); Mukhtar Pasha; Veli Pasha; Hussain Pasha; Omer Vrioni (Until late 1820); Odysseas Androutsos	(Ottoman Empire) Mahmud II (Ottoman Empire) Ismail Pashabey (Ottoman Empire) Hurshid Pasha (Ottoman Empire) Omer Vrioni (From late 1820); Mustafa Bushatli

Strength
Unknown	Morea: 30,000 soldiers

The Yanina–Ottoman War was a conflict between Ali Pasha, the ruler of the de facto independent Pashalik of Yanina, and the Ottoman Empire. The war was caused by the expansionist policies and growing autonomy of Ali Pasha, which posed a direct threat to the central authority of the Ottoman government.

== Background ==
Ali Pasha had served both Sultan Selim III and Sultan Mahmud II in military campaigns, including against Osman Pasvanoğlu in Vidin and Russia, where his troops gained a strong reputation for their effectiveness. Through these services, he secured key positions and extended his control over Albanian and Greek territories.

In February 1820, Ismail Pashabey, a former ally of Ali Pasha, accused him of attempting to assassinate him on the streets of Constantinople. Three Albanians were arrested, confessed under interrogation, and were subsequently executed. The incident was likely orchestrated in an effort to justify removing Ali Pasha from power. Shortly after, Ali was declared an enemy of the Sublime Porte. Several of Ali's family members were stripped of the provinces they had previously governed.

In response, Ali sought to rally support from other dissatisfied groups within the empire, including Montenegrins, Serbs, Klepths and Greeks, promising arms and loot if they fought for him. He also sought help from the British. In April 1820, he met with Sir Frederick Hankey, the representative of Sir Thomas Maitland, in Preveza, requesting protection from the British fleet, knowing his flank was exposed to attack by Ottomans.

While Maitland feared that Ali might seek Russian support if Britain declined, Henry Bathurst, the Colonial Secretary, had issued firm instructions: there was no treaty barring Ottoman naval operations in the Ionian Sea, and Britain had no right to intervene on Ali's behalf. Before receiving Britain's response, Ali had already turned to Russia, offering even more than he had offered the British. He promised that if Russia recognized his authority under the Tsar, he would raise his subjects in revolt against the Sultan and help Russia conquer Rumelia. The Russian response was limited to vague assurances, hoping Ali would challenge the Sultan independently.

== War ==
In July 1820, the Sublime Porte sent Ali Pasha an ultimatum, ordering him to appear within forty days to justify himself. Ali, aware of the risk involved, refused to comply. His defiance, however, gave the Sultan a convenient pretext to take military action. Ismail Pashabey was tasked with assembling a large force, including regular troops under the pashas of Scutari and Larissa. By April, the Ottoman army, led by Ismail, began advancing toward Ali's territories. At the time, Ali controlled most of Greece and southern Albania. He quickly bolstered his forces with volunteers but avoided direct confrontation, instead falling back to defensive positions. The Ottomans soon captured Larissa from Veli Pasha, significantly weakening Ali's eastern front. In response, Omer Vrioni and 15,000 men were positioned at Metsovo to guard against further advances, while Odysseas Androutsos held the mountain pass near Livadia.

In the north, Muhtar Pasha and Hussain Pasha resisted an offensive by Mustafa Pasha Bushatli, the ruler of the Pashalik of Scutari, on Berat and Tepelena. To the south, Preveza, a key city for defense against naval attacks, remained under the control of Veli Pasha, who had been expelled from Lepanto, while his son, Mehmet Pasha, held Parga. Ali himself remained in Ioannina with a garrison of 8,000 soldiers.

The Ottoman army advanced along the western coastline, while an Ottoman naval force from Constantinople, consisting of three line-of-battle ships, five frigates, and around twenty brigs manned by squadrons from Algeria and Egypt, destroyed Ali's Greek fleet in the harbor of Galaxidi, north of the Gulf of Corinth. During this phase, Spyros Kolovos, one of Ali's secretaries and intermediaries, was captured by the Ottomans while trying to obtain ammunition from Corfu. He was tortured to death.

As the war began to turn in favor of the Ottomans, the Sultan offered a general pardon to anyone fighting for Ali if they surrendered. This caused Ali's sons to waver. Mukhtar Pasha surrendered Berat, while Selim surrendered Argyrocastro. The Ottomans further undermined Ali by bribing his troops and recruiting the Souliotes, with whom Ali had long-standing hostilities. The Souliotes were invited to reclaim their homeland, and a joint Ottoman–Souliote force under Pehlevan Baba captured Lepanto, Missolonghi, and Vonitza, then laid siege to Preveza, though Ali's fort at Kiafa withstood the assault. Only Hussein Bey swore to die for his grandfather.

As the Ottomans closed in, Sir Charles Napier paid Ali a visit in Ioannina, urging him to spend money on strengthening his fortifications and reorganizing his forces, but Ali was reluctant to part with his wealth. Napier presented plan after plan. He even suggested assembling 8,000 British troops at Parga before February 1821 if Ali could hold out until then, but Ali refused to act.

Only when Odysseus Androutsos retreated from Thermopylae and Omer Vrionis defected to the Ottomans, with his 15,000 men, did Ali offer Napier £2 million to improve his defenses. By then, it was too late. In August 1820 Ioannina began to be slowly surrounded by a 25,000 to 50,000-strong Ottoman army and by October the city was completely encircled by an army prepared for a prolonged siege.

=== Siege of Yanina ===
In 1815, Ali completely rebuilt the old Byzantine walls of Ioannina and added an inner citadel. The siege by Ottoman forces began in the winter of 1820. From the start, the siege was plagued by difficulties, the disciplined Ottoman army slowly deteriorated, supplies were scarce, and the surrounding countryside was devastated. Eyewitnesses reported that Ottoman soldiers were “raiding cities, townships, and villages without the slightest restraint and stealing their last morsel of food from the mouths of poor Greeks”. Both sides employed Albanian mercenaries, whose loyalty was often uncertain. With the countryside ravaged, many Greeks shifted alliances and returned to support Ali. Ali’s spies reported that the presence of the Souliotes caused a rift in the Ottoman army, with local beys and agha threatening to desert. After the Souliotes failed to capture the fortress of Kiafa, they were withdrawn from the front lines, stationed in exposed positions, and given little support when attacked. Resentful, the Souliotes began negotiations with Ali in December 1820 and withdrew to their homeland in Souli. Soon after, Ali ordered his commander at Kiafa to hand over the fortress to the Souliotes. The Ottomans attempted to win back their allegiance through the Greek metropolitan of Arta, but these efforts failed. Dissatisfied with the ineffectiveness of Ismail, the Sultan replaced him with Hurshid Pasha, former grand vizier and newly appointed governor of the Morea. Hurshid reorganized the army, but both sides continued to suffer from defections. The situation in the Ottoman camp was so precarious that Hurshid remained there at all times.

On 7 February 1821, Ali, unwilling to remain passive, was tricked into launching an attack. Believing the Ottoman position to be vulnerable, he encountered a prepared Ottoman counterattack and was severely defeated.

Meanwhile, Alexandros Ypsilantis, leader of the Filiki Eteria, saw Ali’s conflict as a diversion. He began organizing the Greek independence movement, ordering Theodoros Kolokotronis to rally the klephts to join the Souliotes. Ypsilantis instructed that any towns and fortresses captured from the Ottomans should be garrisoned by forces prepared to declare for the Greek rebellion. When Hurshid Pasha left the Morea for the northern campaign, Mehmet Salik, acting governor, doubled the Jizya, increasing dissatisfaction and made the region ripe for revolt.

In February 1821, Alexandros Ypsilantis moved an army of Greeks, Albanians, and Russian forces into Wallachia, to start an uprising supported by Russia. By March, a revolt had begun in the Morea, but the Ottomans, still more concerned with Ali Pasha, initially ignored it, allowing the rebels to consolidate power. The Sultan supported the grand vizier Halet Effendi’s policy of discouraging Albanian Muslims from cooperating with Christian klephts. Ali attempted to intervene by sending Alexis Noutsos to propose a collaboration aimed at establishing an Albanian-Greek state under his rule. However, Noutsos did not return and instead joined Alexander Mavrokordatos at Missolonghi, participating in the Greek revolution.

By September 1821, the situation had become a two front war for Hurshid Pasha, who besieged Ali in the north while Greek forces attacked Ottoman positions in the south. Greek chieftains at Peta, near Arta, formed an alliance with the Souliotes and Ali, on the condition that villages Ali had converted into chifliks be freed. Fearing that Ali might negotiate with the Ottomans, Mavrokordatos persuaded Markos Botsaris to abandon Ali’s cause and join the Greek chieftains besieging Arta. The Ottomans attempted to exploit divisions by sending Omer Vrioni to relieve Arta, convincing Albanian forces that Ali was near defeat and the Greeks were only fighting for their own interests. Discovering that the Greek rebels lacked arms and ammunition and had destroyed mosques, many Albanians abandoned the Souliotes and joined Vrioni. By October 1821, the war had taken its toll. Supplies were running low and Ali decided to retreat with his supplicants and sycophants to the citadel, in what was essentially a bunker, burning the town as he left.

In January 1822, Ali had retreated to his inner tower with the last remaining 100 soldiers, after the Ottomans broke through. Ali still had his treasure horde and used it to broker a truce with Hurshid. He wanted to plead with the Sultan, in doing so, in the hope of receiving a pardon. However, when Hurshid finally gained access to the citadel on 5 February 1822, Ali was shot through the heart by an Ottoman soldier, ending the war.
