= Veli Bey of Tepelena =

Albanian clan leader

Veli Bey

Mutasarrıf of Delvinë
- In office 1762–?

Personal details
- Born: Tepelena, Sanjak of Delvina, Ottoman Empire
- Died: Tepelena, Sanjak of Delvina, Ottoman Empire
- Spouse(s): Hamko Hanim, daughter of the Bey of Konica
- Children: Ali Pasha; Shainitza; Unnamed son
- Parent: Muhtar Bey

Veli Bey was an Albanian clan leader and local ruler in Tepelena during the 18th century. A leading member of the Meçohysaj clan, Veli was appointed as mutasarrıf of the Sanjak of Delvina after a power struggle with his cousins and brothers regarding the inheritance of his deceased father Muhtar Bey. He was also the father of Ali Pasha Tepelena, the eventual ruler of the Pashalik of Yanina.

== Early life ==
Veli was the third son of Muhtar Bey, a notable Albanian brigand chieftain of the Meçohysaj clan from Tepelena who fought both for and against the Ottomans. Muhtar himself was the son of Mustafa Yussuf from the Gjirokastër region, a notable brigand, warrior and clan chieftain who eventually obtained the title of bey and possibly official recognition as the deputy governor of Tepelena. The family was of local Albanian origin.

== Later life and death ==
Veli's father, Muhtar Bey, would die fighting the Venetians at the siege of Corfu in 1716 on the side of the Ottomans. Becoming a Bey during this period was the recognition of the hereditary leadership of an individual within a tribe or clan and its fighters, and so upon Muhtar's death, some of his followers and titles went to his son, Veli. Veli became involved in a rivalry with his cousin, Islam Bey, who was also a local ruler. This rivalry was caused by a dispute between Veli and Islam in regards to the division of Muhtar's inheritance; in particular, it included a dispute on who was to exact feudal control over numerous wealthy and well-manned Albanian Christian villages.

Initially, the Sublime Porte officially recognised Islam Bey by appointing him mutasarrıf of the Sanjak of Delvina in 1752 and granting him the title of Pasha of the two tails. Islam Bey was later dismissed after proving to be inefficient and unpopular, and in the summer of 1759, Veli murdered Islam after attacking and destroying his residence. Additionally, as the third son of Muhtar, Veli could only claim his inheritance in Tepelena by force, and so he attacked the town with his men and burned his brothers alive.

In 1762, Veli Bey was acknowledged by the Porte with the title of mir-i-miran, or bey of beys, and was promoted as the Pasha of the two tails and mutasarrıf of Delvinë, probably holding the Sanjak of Avlona as well. Veli's actions earned him many enemies, and he was soon driven out of Tepelena, dying soon after. Veli was assassinated by rival chiefs when his son Ali (the future Ali Pasha of Tepelena) was between 10 and 15 years old, and Ali was subsequently brought up by his mother, Chamko (or Hanko/Hamko), who was the daughter of the Bey of Konica. Hamko would then take control of Veli's band in order to maintain her family's position, but their influence would soon diminish and the family would be expelled from Tepelena whilst Ali was still young.

Veli Bey was succeeded by Kaplan Pasha of Gjirokastër as mutasarrıf of the Sanjak of Delvina. Kaplan's daughter, Emine, would soon be engaged to Veli's son Ali Pasha, and the pair would have two sons, Muhtar Pasha and Veli Pasha. Kaplan himself was beheaded by Ottoman authorities in Manastir in 1766 on charges of corruption, tax revenue theft and the murder of his rivals.

== Family ==
Veli Bey was married to Hamko - the daughter of the Bey of Konica - and another woman. With these two wives, he fathered three children - two sons (Ali and an unnamed boy) and a daughter named Shainitza. Their exact relationships are obscure. Upon Veli's death, Hamko poisoned Ali's half-brother and the boy's mother to ensure Ali's inheritance.

== Sources ==
- Clayer, Nathalie (2014). "Ali Paşa Tepedelenli". In Fleet, Kate; Krämer, Gudrun; Matringe, Denis; Nawas, John; Rowson, Everett (eds.). Encyclopaedia of Islam (3rd ed.). Brill Online. doi:10.1163/1573-3912_ei3_COM_23950. ISSN 1873-9830.
- Fleming, Katherine Elizabeth. The Muslim Bonaparte: diplomacy and orientalism in Ali Pasha's Greece. Princeton University Press, 1999. ISBN 978-0-691-00194-4.
