= Siege of Vidin =

Siege of Vidin may refer to:

- Siege of Vidin (1365)
- Siege of Vidin (1689)
- Siege of Vidin (1798)
- Siege of Vidin (1878)
- Siege of Vidin (1885)
- Siege of Vidin (1913)
