= Admiral Pisani =

Admiral Pisani may refer to:

- Andrea Pisani (admiral) (1662–1718), Venetian admiral
- Niccolò Pisani (fl. 1350–1354), Venetian admiral
- Vettor Pisani (1324–1380), Venetian admiral
