= Stefano de Mari (admiral) =

Genoese navy officer in the service of Spain

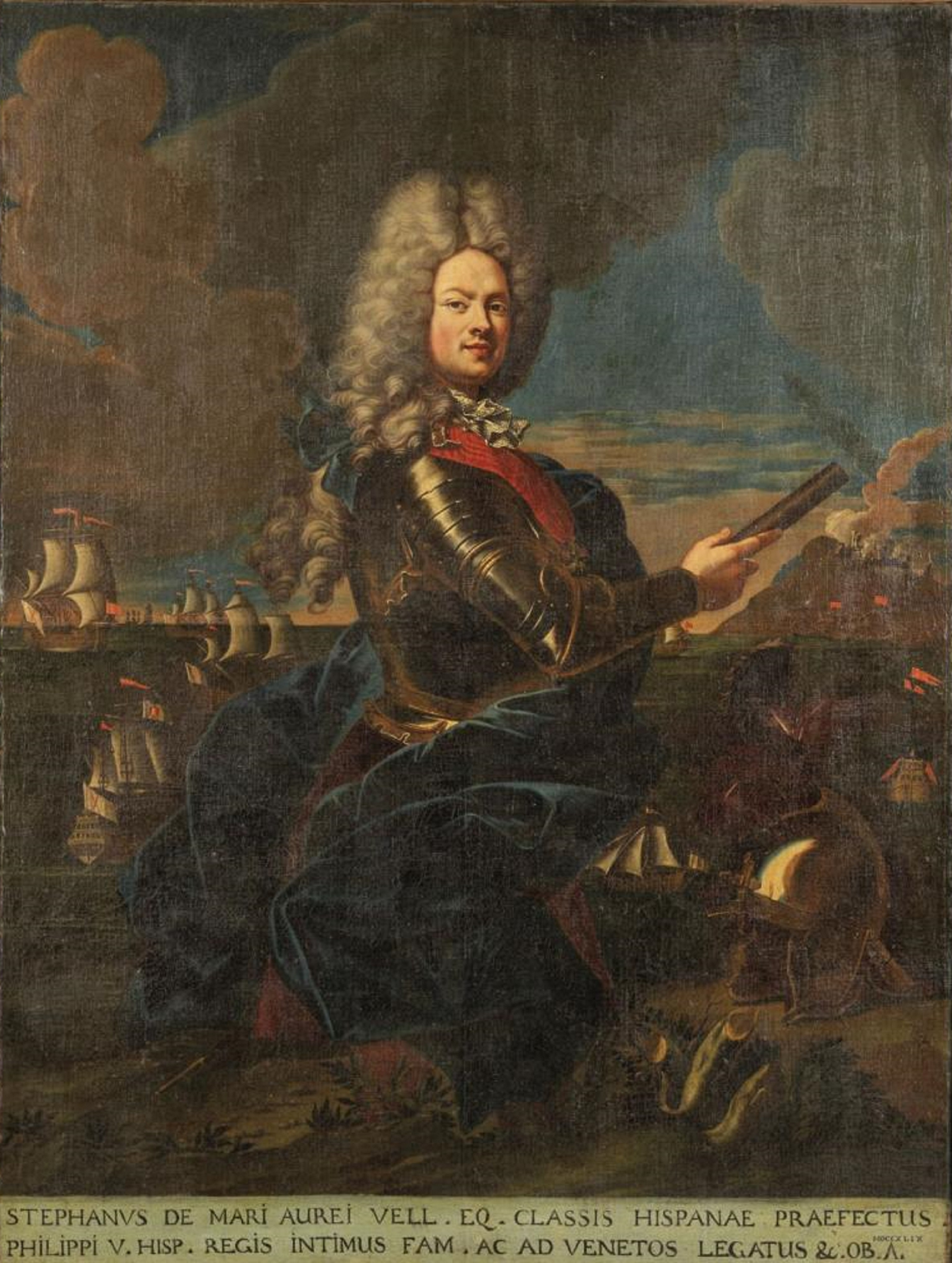
- Portrait by Giovanni Maria delle Piane.
- Born: 19 July 1683; Genoa
- Died: 23 March 1751 (aged 67); Cádiz, Spain
- Military career
- Allegiance: Republic of Genoa; Spain
- Branch: Spanish Navy
- Service years: 17th century–1745
- Rank: Admiral
- Commands: Spanish Navy

Stefano de Mari Centurione (July 19, 1683 - March 23, 1759), Marquis of Villamayor, was a Genoese shipbuilder, diplomat and navy officer in the service of Spain. He was a shipbuilder and chairman of the Real Armada and director of the Naval Military Academy. For his services, he was awarded with the Order of the Golden Fleece.

== Biography ==
He was the son of Francesco de Mari and grandson to former 117.º Doge of Genoa and King of Corsica Stefano de Mari, a role filled by several other members of his family. His mother was Livia Maria Centurione, daughter of condottiero Ippolito Centurione, who became an admiral for King Louis XIV of France.

During his teenage years, he served in his father's private squad of galleys in the service of King Charles II of Spain, and after Charles' death, they joined Philip of Anjou during the War of the Spanish Succession. In 1714 he stopped being a contractor and was given a rank within the Spanish navy, serving under Andrés de Pez. In 1716 he was sent to join the Christian relief fleet to the Seventh Ottoman–Venetian War, leading six ships of the line after Baltasar Vélez de Guevara had joined with five galleys. Along with the rest of the fleet, they managed to lift the Ottoman siege of Corfu.

He continued career during the War of the Quadruple Alliance, participating with a distinguished role in the otherwise disastrous Battle of Cape Passaro, where he tried to run aground his ship before being captured. Despite the defeat, he was awarded with the Order of the Golden Fleece, created Marquis of Villamayor and promoted chairman of the Spanish Navy in 1729. In 1731, he commanded the Spanish armada during the War of the Polish Succession, landing Prince Charles for the successful capture of the duchies of Parma and Piecenza.

He was made Spanish ambassador in the Republic of Venice in 1541. Some sources mistakenly place his year the same year, but by 1745 he was appointed Sumiller de Corps of Philip, Duke of Parma before retiring shortly after due to bad health. He died in either 1749 or 1751, most probably the latter year.
