= Old Fortress, Corfu =

Venetian fortress in Greece

Old Fortress
- Παλαιό Φρούριο
- Part of the defences of Corfu City
- Corfu, Greece
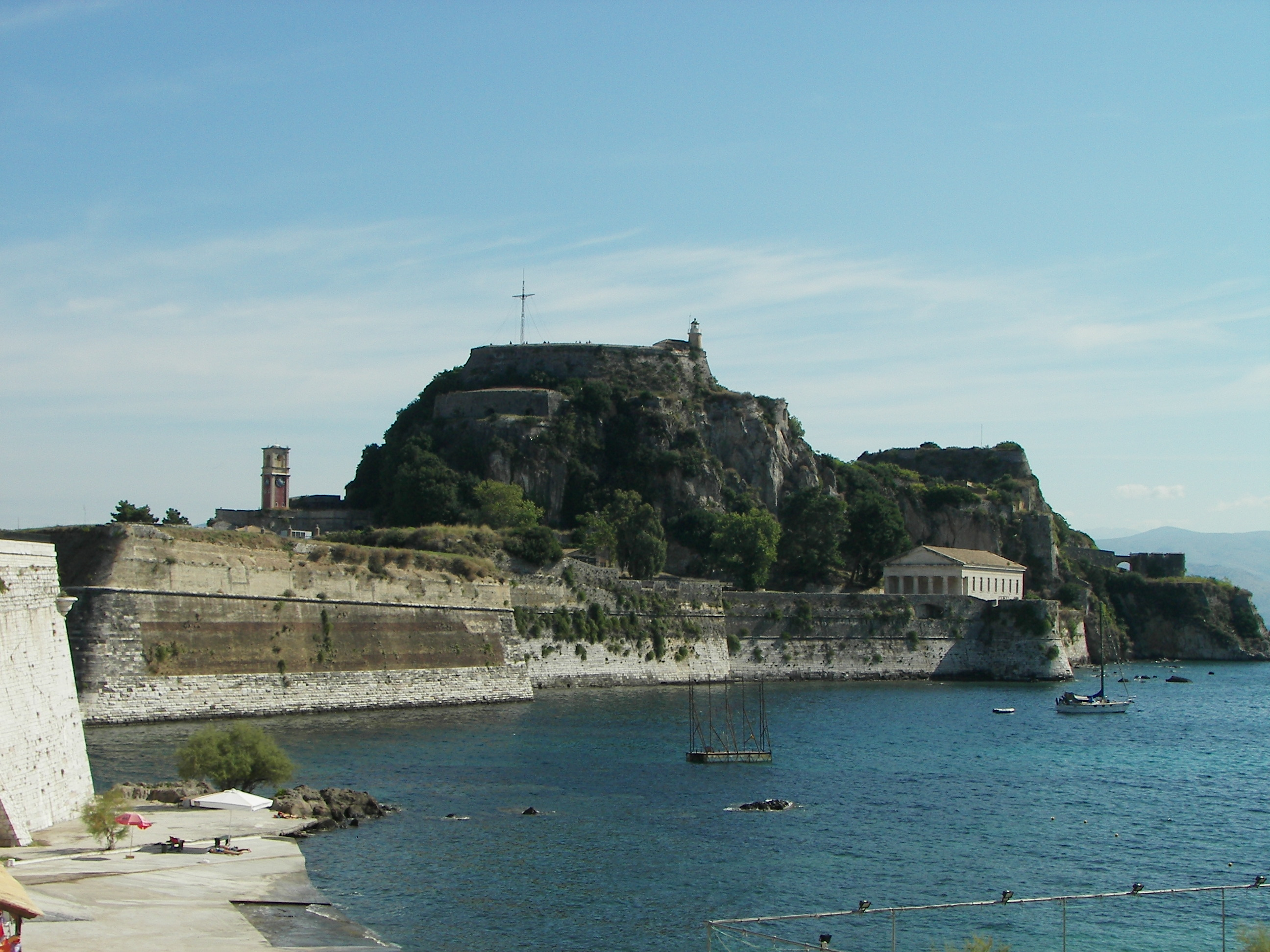

Site information
- Owner: Greece
- Controlled by: Republic of Venice (until 1797), France (1797–99, 1807–14), Septinsular Republic (1800–07), United Kingdom (1814–64), Greece (since 1864)
- Open to the public: Yes

Location
- Coordinates: 39.623°N 19.930°E

Site history
- Built: Early 15th century, 1545–55, 1720s
- Battles/wars: Siege of Corfu (1537), Siege of Corfu (1571), Siege of Corfu (1716), Siege of Corfu (1798–99), Corfu Incident

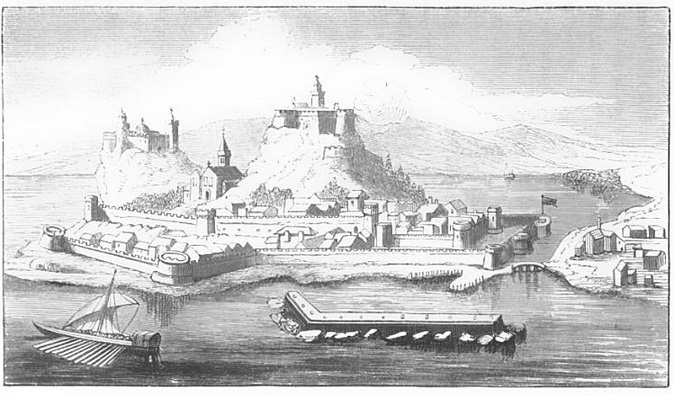
Old Fortress in the 16th century from a print at the British Museum. The protective wall of the marina is visible in front of the castle. The marina is still in use to this day.

The Old Fortress of Corfu (Greek: Παλαιό Φρούριο, Venetian: Fortezza Vecchia) is a Venetian fortress in the city of Corfu, Greece. The fortress covers the promontory which initially contained the old town of Corfu that had emerged during Byzantine times.

Before the Venetian era the promontory, which lies between the Gulf of Kerkyra to the north and Garitsa Bay to the south, was defended by Byzantine fortifications which the Venetians largely replaced with fortifications of their own design. As part of their defensive plans the Venetians separated the promontory from the rest of the city of Corfu by creating the Contrafossa, a moat which is a sea channel connecting the Gulf of Kerkyra to the North with the Bay of Garitsa to the South, converting the citadel into an artificial island. The fort successfully repulsed all three major Ottoman sieges: the great siege of 1537, the siege of 1571 and the second great siege of Corfu in 1716.

The town of Corfu got its Western name from the twin peaks of the fortress ("Coryphe" in Greek).

== Origins ==
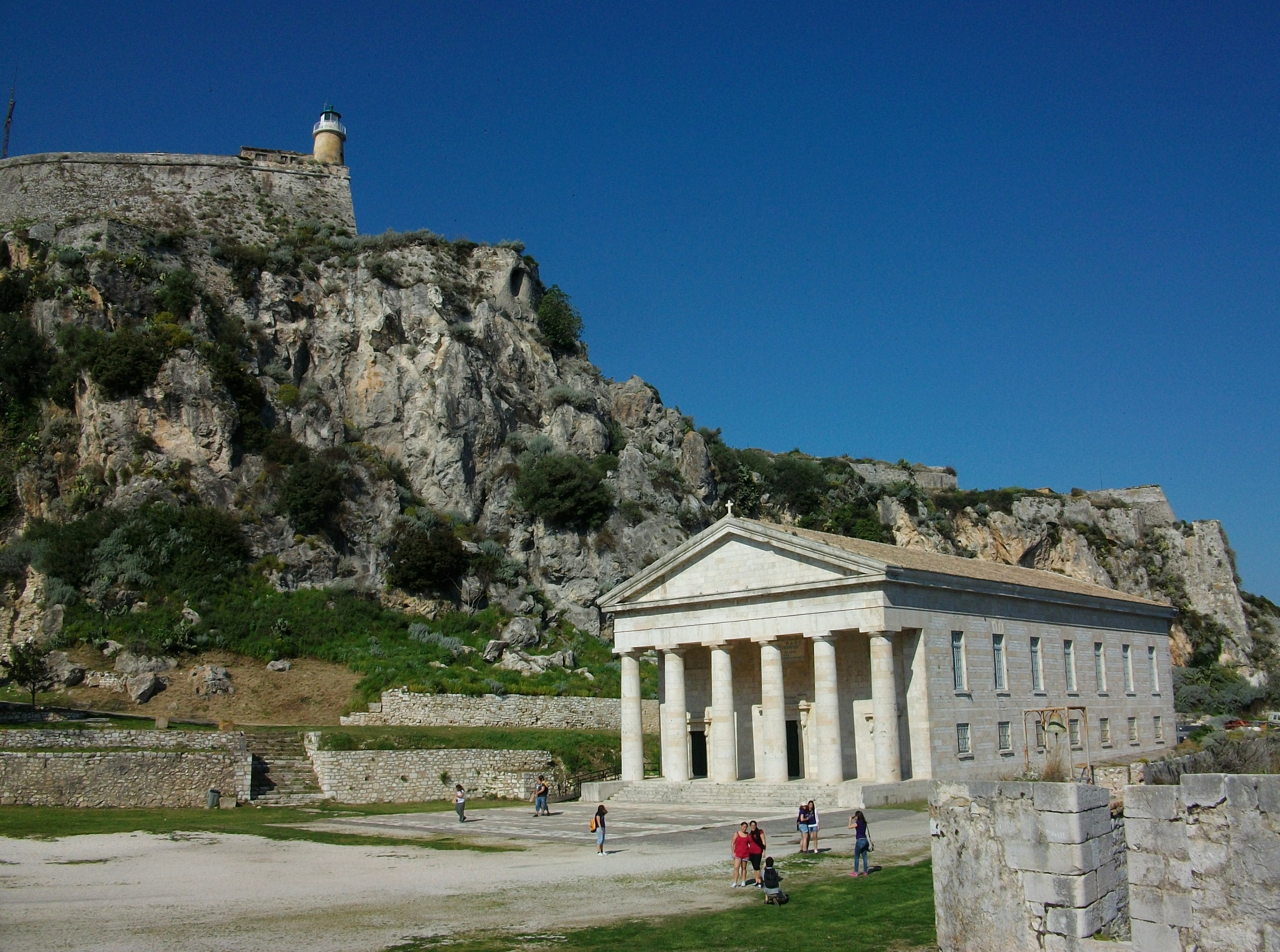
The church of St. George at the fortress

The earliest indication of fortifications on the site presently occupied by the Old Fortress dates from around the 6th century AD, after the destruction of the ancient city of Corcyra by the Ostrogoths. The Gothic invasion forced the Corcyreans to seek shelter inside fortifications on the peninsula at the tip of the city.

Following a hiatus where no political or military developments in the citadel are known between the 7th-10th centuries AD, the first report of renewed fortifications occurs in early 11th century when Anna Komnene refers to it as the "very strongly fortified city of Corfu" in her book the Alexiad.

The citadel features two peaks which were fortified by strong towers for centuries. The western and higher peak, which is closer to the town, was fortified by the Byzantines around the 12th century AD and was called Castel a Terra or "Castle near the Land" by the Venetians, who also called it Castel Nuovo or "New Castle". The eastern peak was called Castel a Mare (Castel by the Sea) or Castel Vecchio (Old Castle) by the Venetians and was also used as powder magazine for a time.

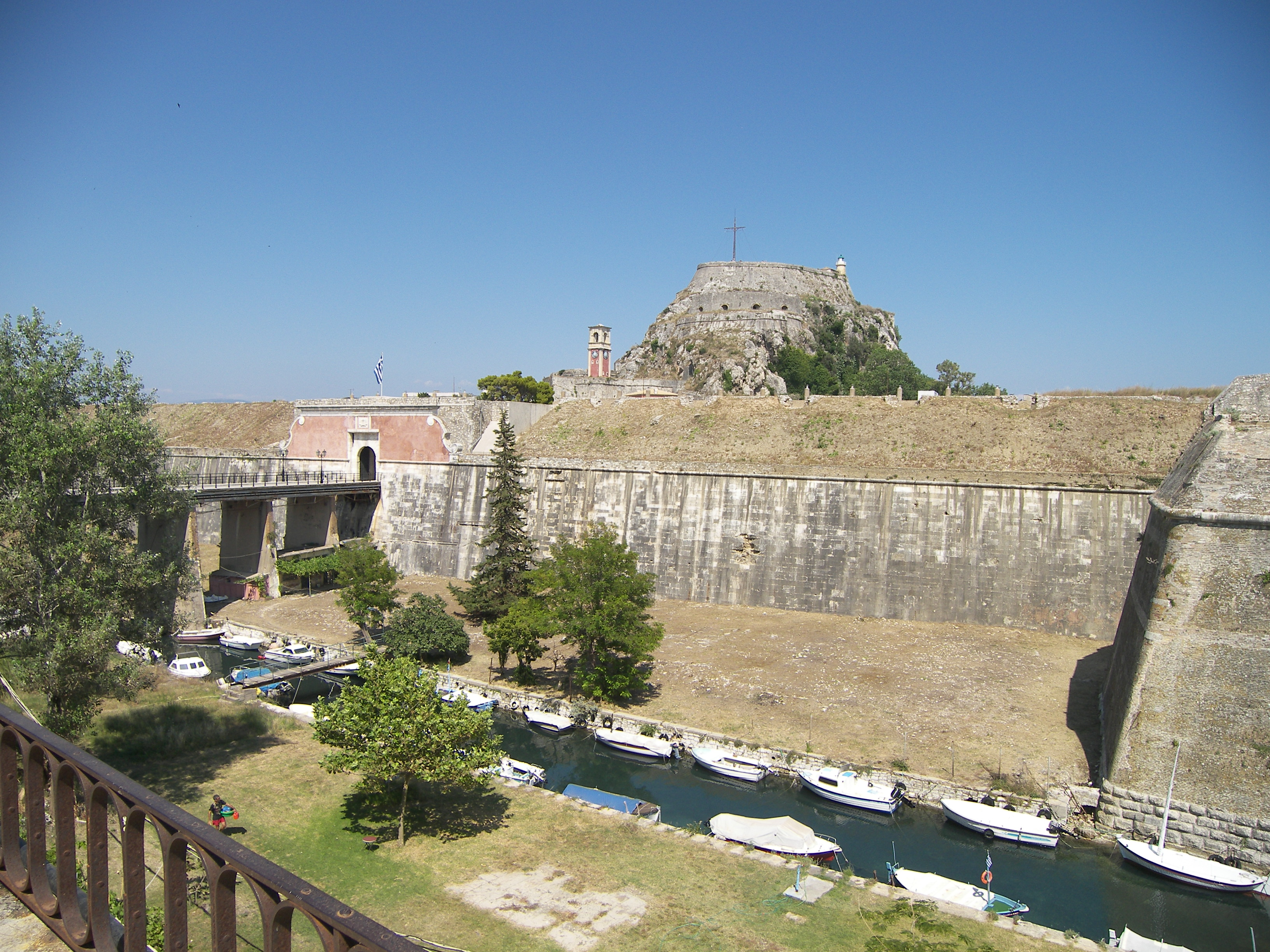
The bridge to the city and the Contrafossa. The hill of Castel a Terra is visible to the east of the main gate.

Following the Gothic invasion and until the 13th century, the medieval town of Corfu developed within the boundaries of the peninsula which today is occupied by the Old Fortress. In the early 15th century the Venetians started replacing the old Byzantine fortifications.

Following the first siege of Corfu by the Ottomans in 1537, the Venetian governor ordered the construction of new defensive zones incorporating new bastions and towers which exist to this day. Venetian military engineers Savorgnan and Martinengo designed bastions for the fortress between 1545 and 1555, which are considered masterpieces of military engineering.

As part of their defensive plans for the peninsula of the citadel, and to secure its perimeter, the Venetians created the Contrafossa, a moat which transformed the citadel into an artificial island. The moat exists to this day and is still known to the locals under its Italian name. Since the creation of Contrafossa, access to the citadel was by a drawbridge, which in modern times has been replaced by a permanent one.

== Ottoman sieges ==
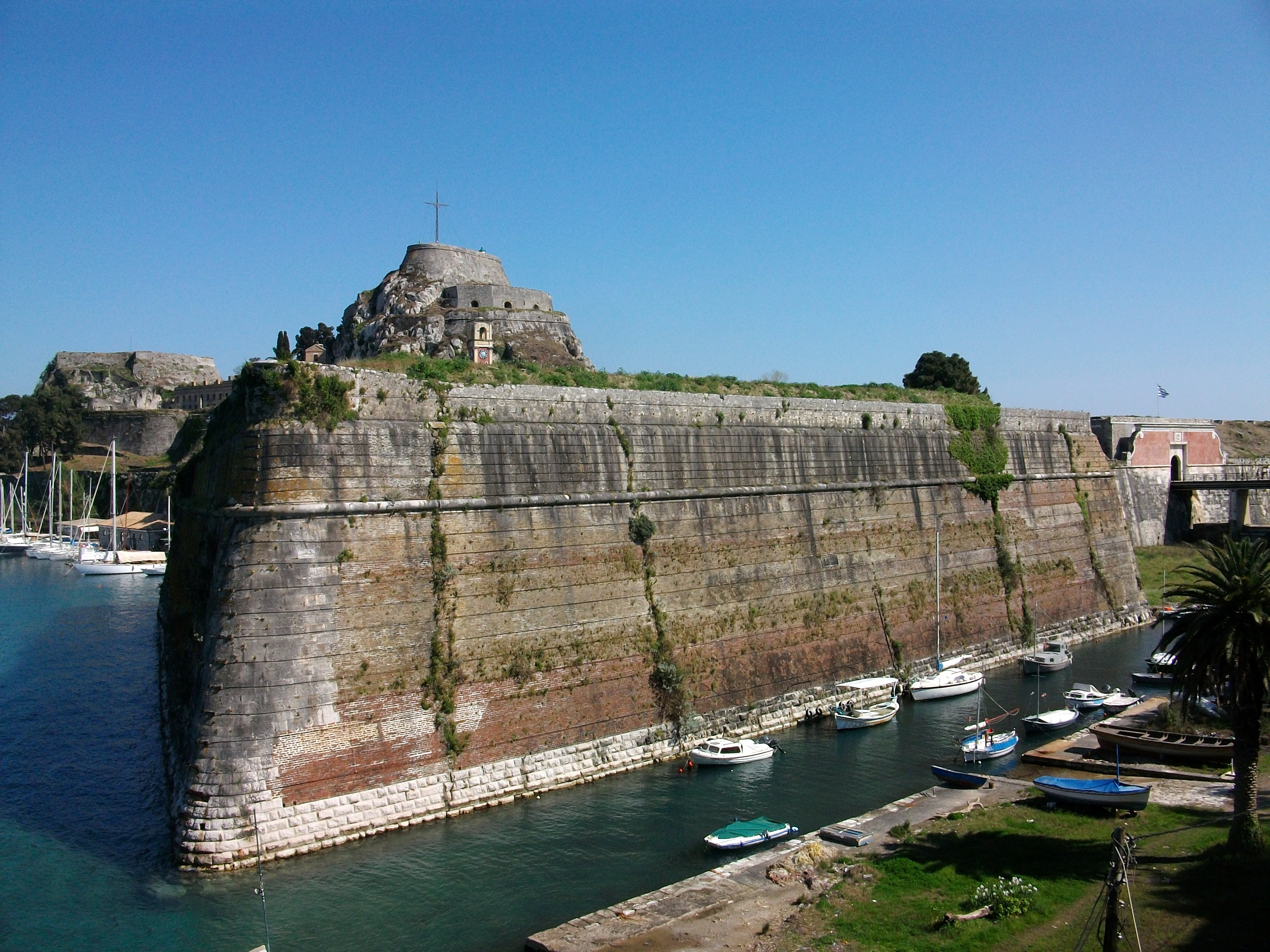
The northern side of Contrafossa opening to the Gulf of Kerkyra. The sea channel separates the citadel from the island of Corfu. The bridge to the city is to the far right. The twin peaks of Castel a Terra and Castel a Mare are visible just above the Contrafossa to the right and left respectively.

The fort successfully repulsed all three major Ottoman sieges: the great siege of 1537, the siege of 1571 and the second great siege of Corfu in 1716.

=== Siege of 1537 ===
In 1537, during the Third Ottoman–Venetian War, Sultan Suleyman the Magnificent dispatched a force of 25,000 men under the command of admiral Hayreddin Barbarossa to attack Corfu. The Ottomans landed at Govino Bay, present day Gouvia, and proceeded toward Corfu town, destroying the village of Potamos as they made their way toward the city.

The Old Fort, Corfu city's only fortification during that period, and the castle of Angelokastro were the only two places on the island not in the hands of the invaders at the time. In undefended parts of the island, people were killed or captured as slaves by the Sultan's army.

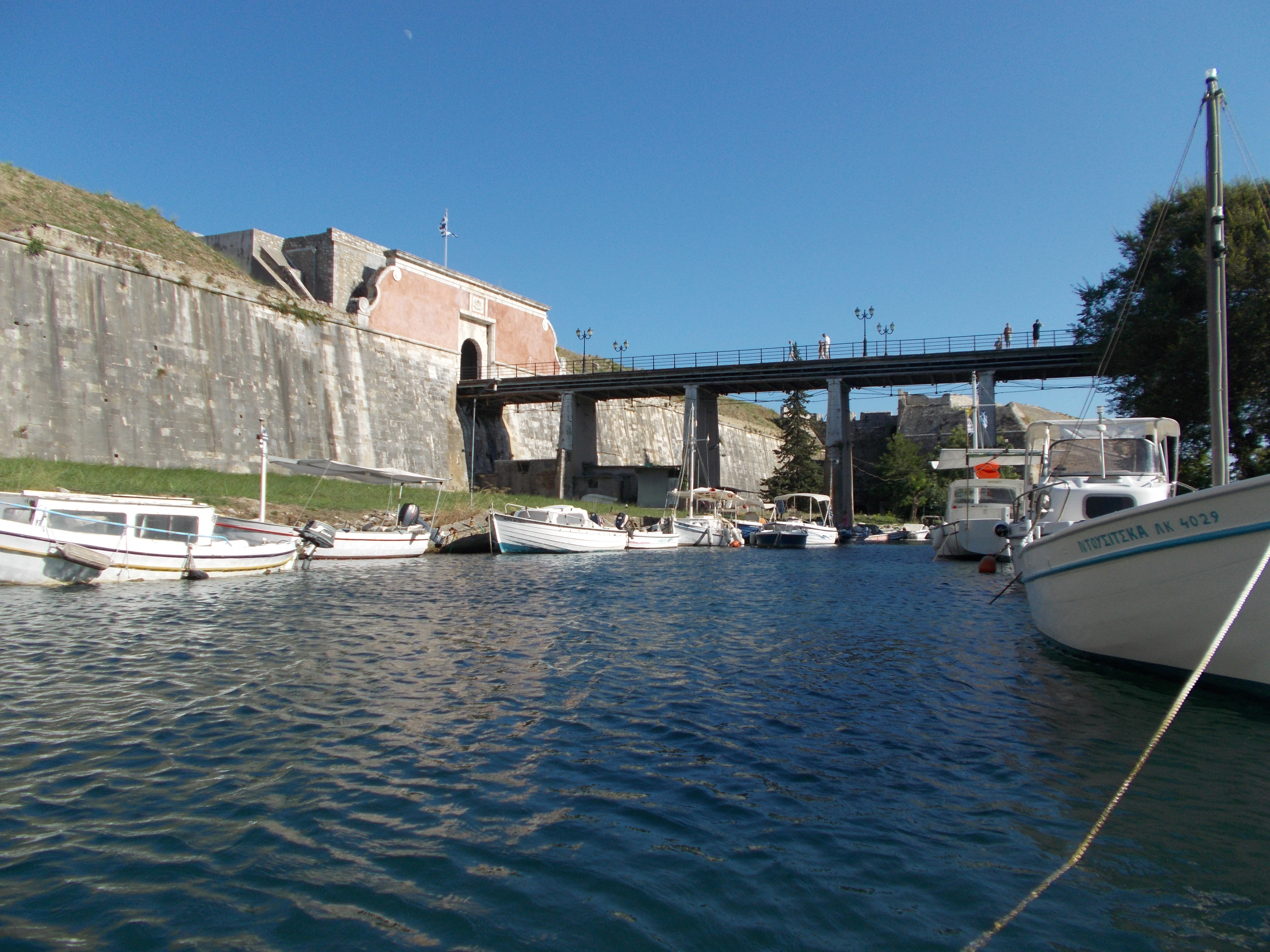
The bridge to the fortress as seen from Contrafossa.

Even at the Old Fortress, women, children and the elderly, called the inutili (useless) by the Venetians, were turned away and left outside the fort to die or be enslaved. The rejection of the people at the gates angered the Corfiots who lost faith in the effectiveness of Venice's defensive plans.

The Corfu fortress was successfully defended by its garrison, as was Angelokastro. As it was retreating from Corfu, the Ottoman army devastated the undefended areas of both Corfu city and the island. In total about 20,000 people who were unable to find shelter in either castle were killed or carried off as slaves.

=== Siege of 1571 ===
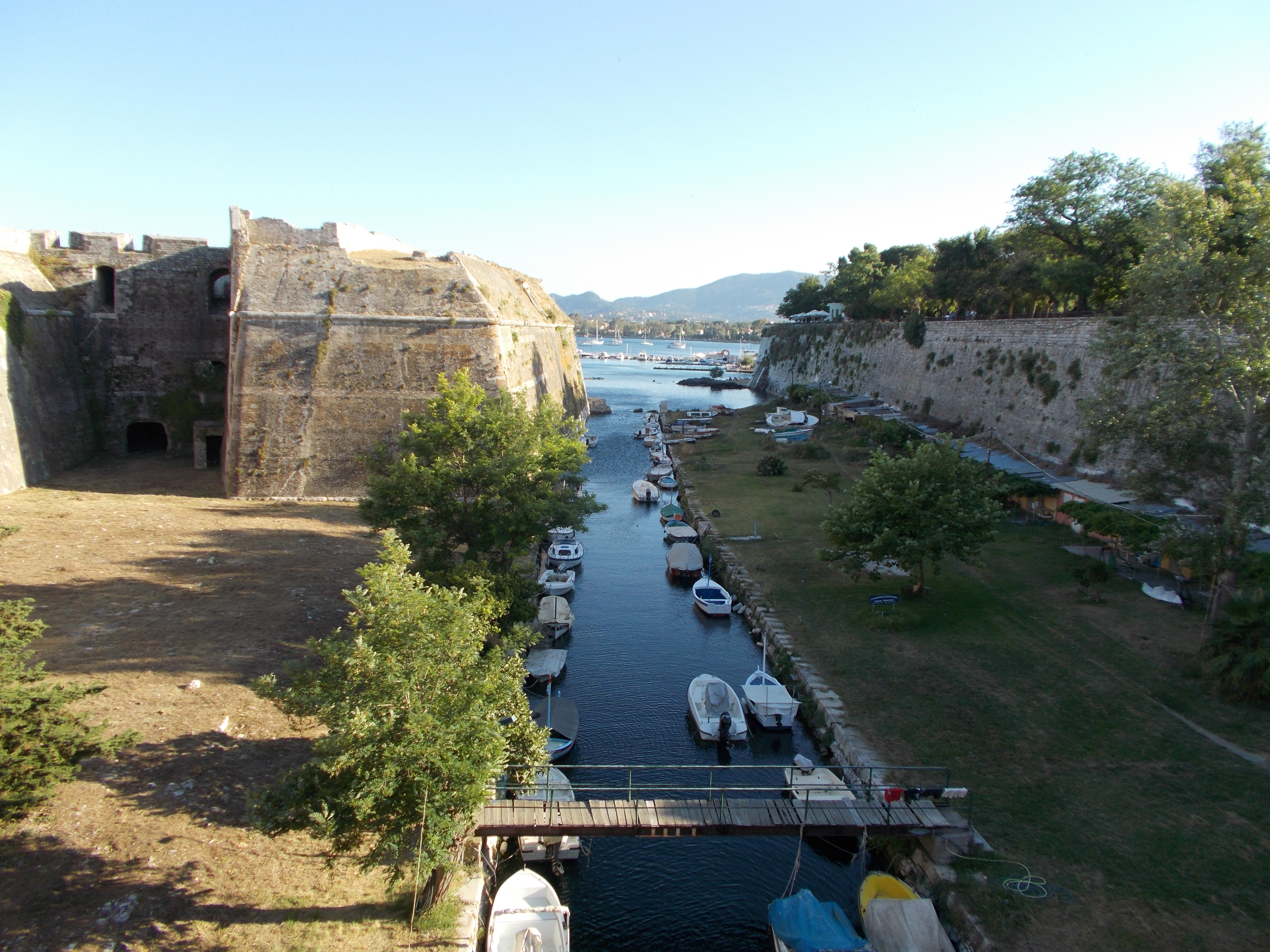
The south side of Contrafossa at the bay of Garitsa facing the facilities of the Nautical and Athletic Club of Corfu (NAOK)

In August 1571, the Ottomans made another attempt at conquering Corfu. Having seized Parga and Mourtos on the Greek mainland, they attacked the Paxoi islands, landing a force there.

An Ottoman force, on its way to the city, first occupied and destroyed the village of Potamos. Although the Corfu city castle stood firm, the rest of Corfu was destroyed and the defenseless civilian population outside the castles suffered heavy casualties. Homes, churches and public buildings were burned in the city suburbs.

=== Siege of 1716 ===
In 1716, during the last Ottoman–Venetian War, the Ottomans made plans to attack Corfu again. In anticipation of the attack, Venice appointed Count Johann Matthias von der Schulenburg in charge of the defence of the fort. In preparation for the Turkish siege, Schulenburg further strengthened the defences of the Old Fortress.

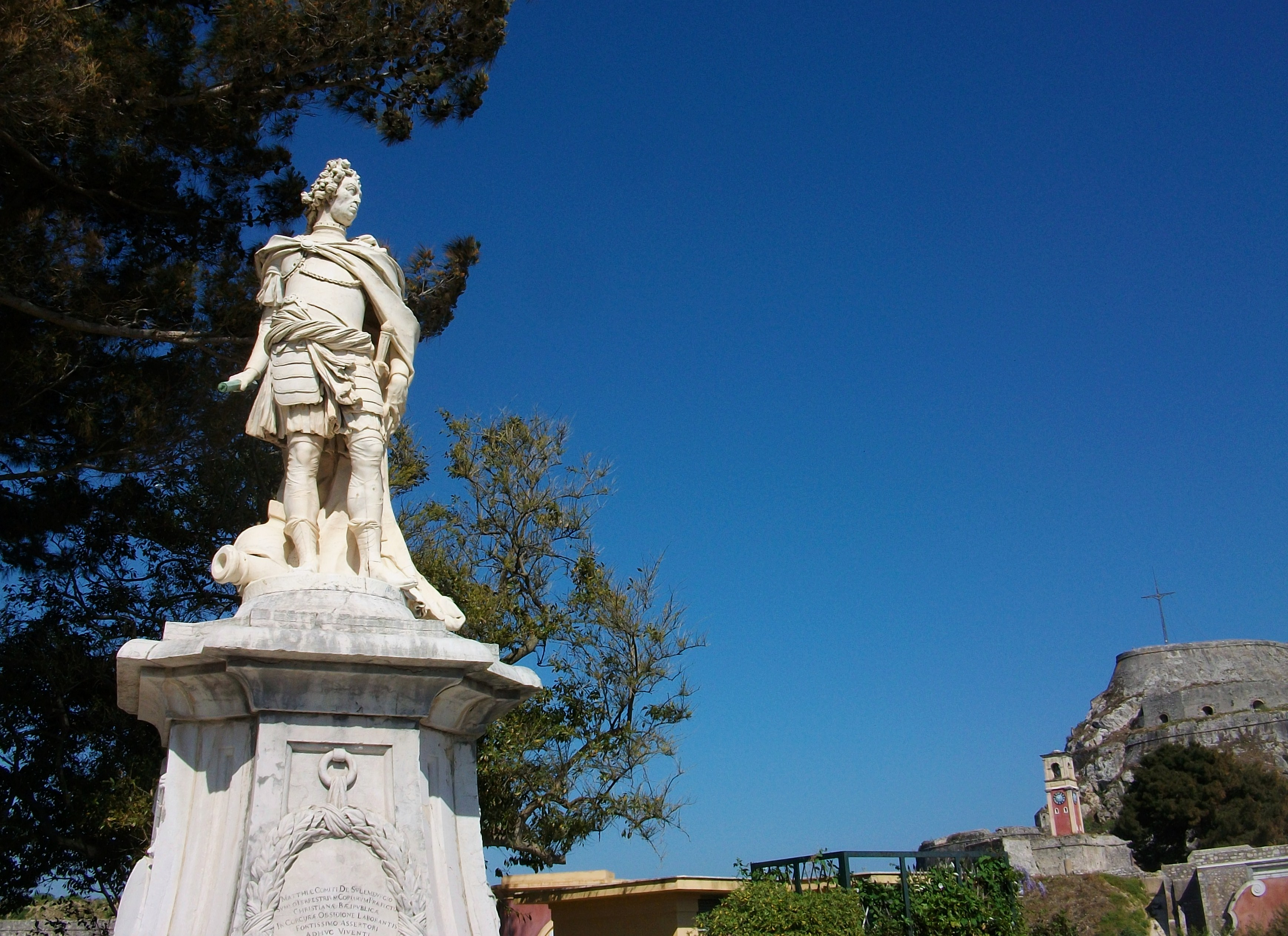
Statue of Count Schulenburg in front of the Fortress

On 6 July 1716 Kara Mustafa Pasha brought the Ottoman fleet to Corfu to lay siege to the fort. The Ottomans upon landing in Corfu established themselves in strategic positions and installed artillery situated on the nearby hills of Avrami and Sarocco and started bombarding the citadel.

After fierce fighting with the Ottomans during which Schulenburg and the local Corfiote garrison distinguished themselves in battle, the Ottomans finally abandoned their plans of capturing the castle and departed Corfu on 19 August 1716 after a siege which lasted seven weeks.

In the aftermath of the siege, the Venetians under Count Schulenburg developed plans to expand the fortifications of the city and a decision was taken to construct new forts atop the Avrami and Sarocco hills to prevent any future bombardment against the old fort. They also built an arsenal at Gouvia to service and repair their fleet.

== Catastrophe of 1718 ==
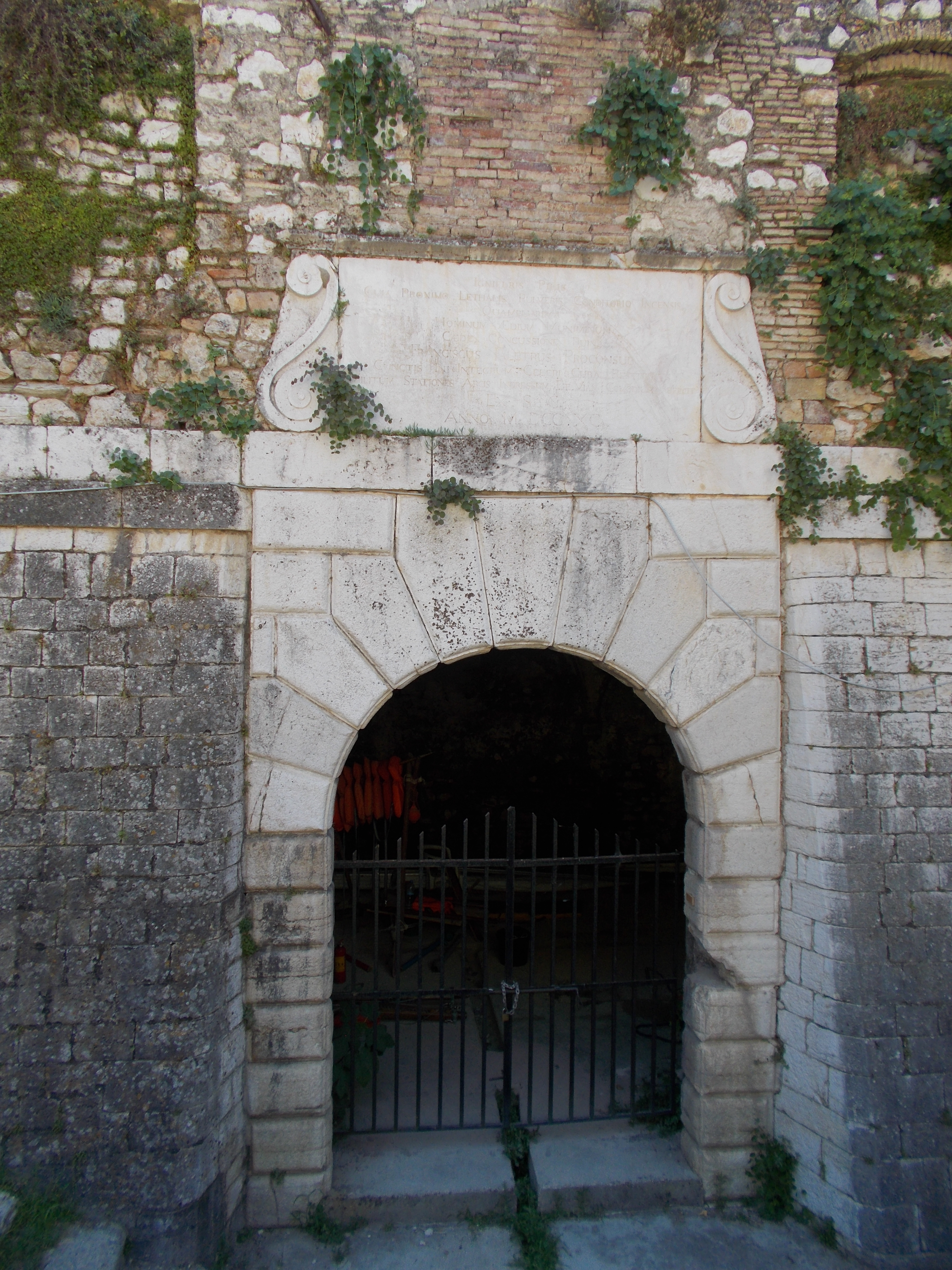
Explosion inscription at the Palaio Frourio: "IGNIFERIS PILIS CUM PROXIMO LETHALIS PULVERIS CONDITORIO INCENSIS QUAM PLURIMA HOMINUM EDIUM MUNIMUM CEDE CONCUSSIONI RUINA FRANCISCUS FALETRUS PROCONSUL CUNCTIS INI INTEGRUM CELERI CURA RESTITUTIS MILITUM STATIONES ARCIS INGPRESSUM ET VIAM COMMODIUS REFECIT EX S(ENATUS) C(ONSULTO) ANNO MDCCXC" translating as "After fire-bearing missiles had ignited the nearby storehouse of lethal powder, causing the destruction of many people and buildings through the impact of the collapse, the Proconsul Franciscus Faletrus restored everything to its original state with swift care. He also rebuilt the soldiers' stations, the entrance to the citadel, and the road more conveniently, by decree of the Senate, in the year 1790."

In 1718 lightning struck the powder magazine at Castel da Mare causing an explosion which created a chain reaction during which three secondary ammunition facilities also exploded, this in turn destroying most buildings inside the castle including the palace of the Captain General of the fortress, and many city buildings.

The Venetian commander of the fortress, Captain Andrea Pisani, brother of the Doge of Venice Alvise Giovanni Mocenigo, was killed along with members of his staff. Hundreds of others died in the explosion, in "one of the greatest catastrophes" in the history of Corfu.

Schulenburg rebuilt the Old Fortress and constructed two new forts on Avrami and Sarocco hills by 1721. These were eventually demolished when Corfu was united with Greece as required by the Treaty of London (1864).

== Governor of the castle ==
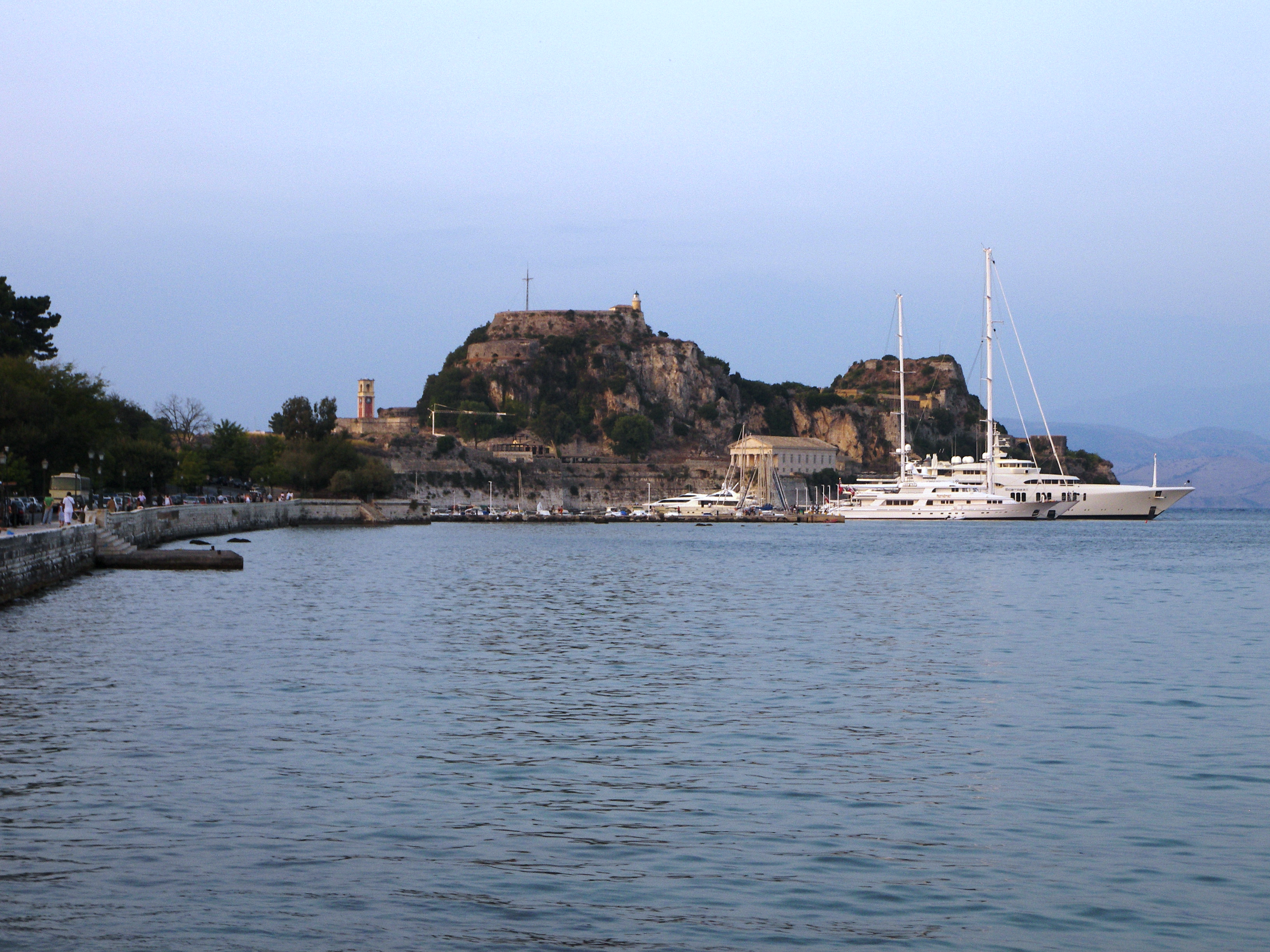
The Fortress and the Bay of Garitsa to the south. The twin peaks Castel a Terra and Castel a Mare are visible. Ships anchored at the marina of the Nautical and Athletic Club of Corfu are in the foreground

The governors of the old and new fortresses were elected by the Venetian senate and they were appointed for a period of two years. Both captains were sworn before the senate and part of their oath was never to communicate with each other during their two-year tenure as governors of the fortresses. This was for security reasons in case one captain could persuade the other to commit treason against the republic.

== Bombardment ==
In 1923 the Old and New Fortresses were bombarded by the Italian Air Force during the Corfu Incident.

== Nazi occupation ==
The Fortress was used at the end of World War II by the Nazis to imprison the Jews of Corfu prior to their deportation from the island. On 8 June 1944 the Jews of Corfu were told to present themselves the next morning at the old Fort. When they heard the ultimatum, some Jewish people escaped to the countryside of Corfu but most, fearing for their families, went the morning of the 9th of June to the old Fort, as they had been told. There, the Nazis forced them to hand over their jewelry and keys to their properties, and subsequently they were led to the prison inside the Fortress. The incarceration of the Jews at the jail of the castle, under harsh conditions and without rudimentary amenities, lasted for days until finally they were transported to Lefkada and then in succession to Patras, Piraeus and Haidari, after which 1,800 Corfiot Jews were deported to the Birkenau extermination camp via rail. Out of those who were forced to leave Corfu, 120 eventually returned.

== Modern times ==
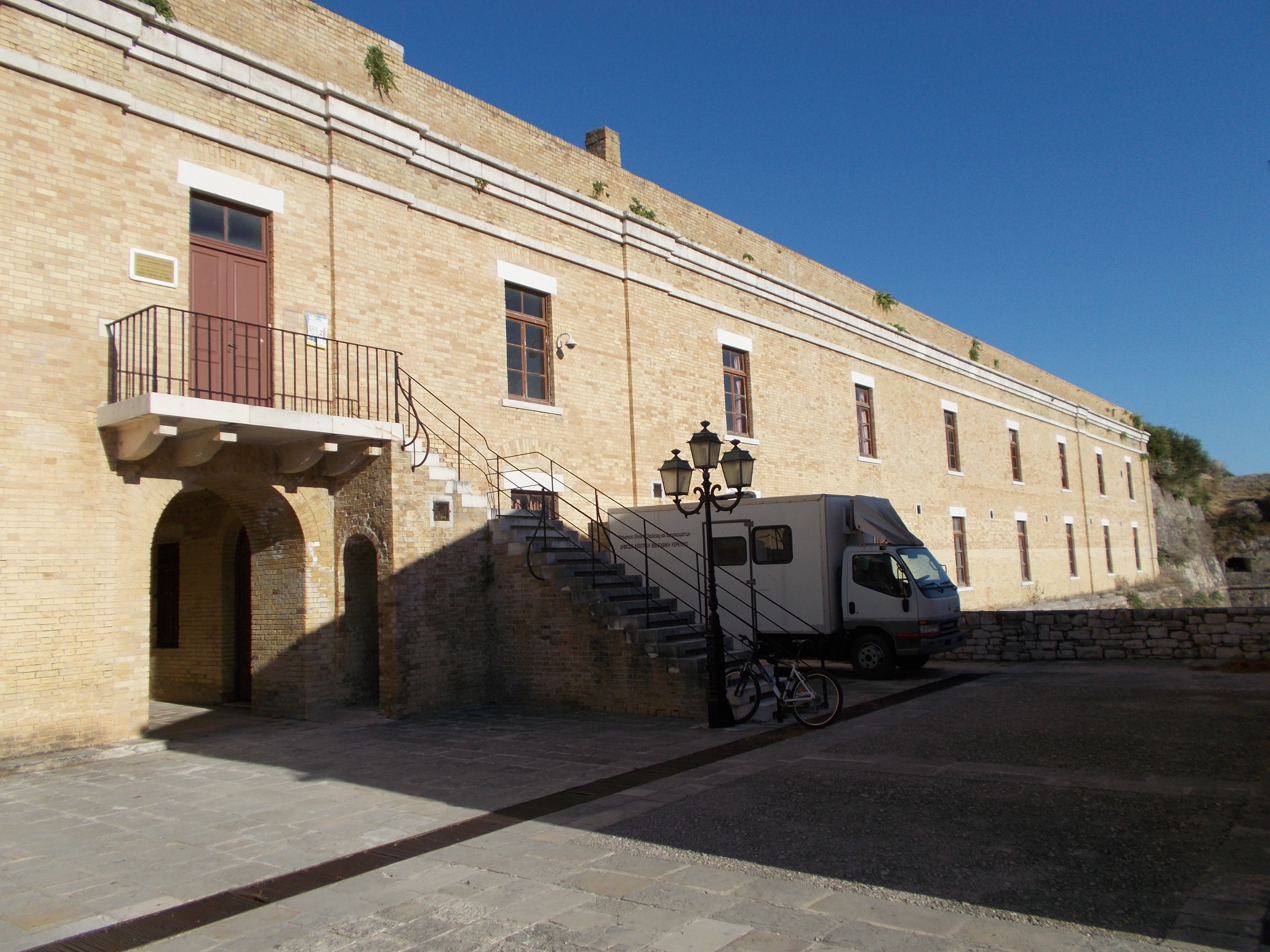
Corfu library at Palaio Frourio

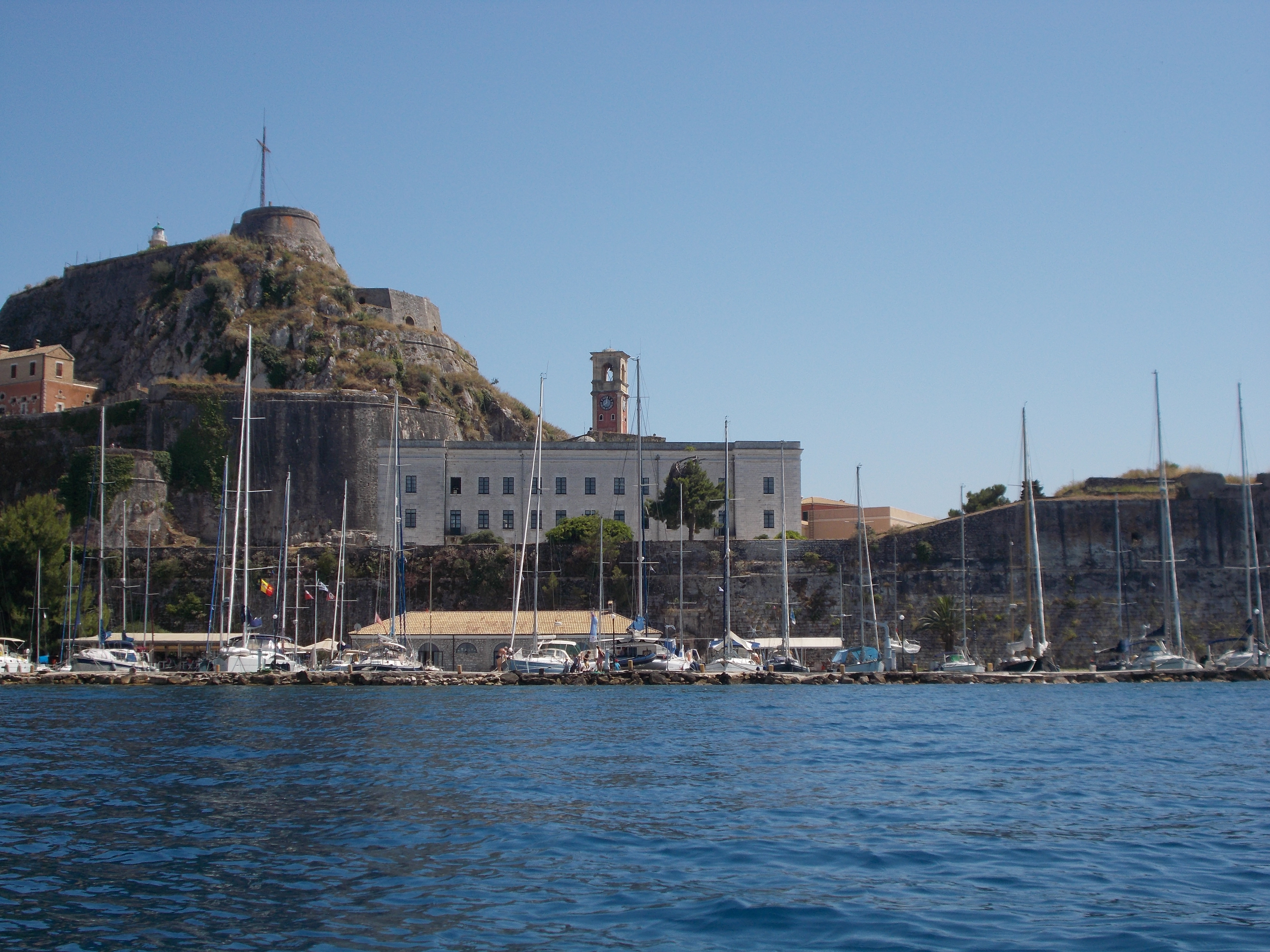
Hellenic Music Research Lab of the Ionian University at the Old Fortress just behind the castle marina

The Fortress houses the Public library of Corfu which is located in the old British barracks. The fortress grounds are also used for various types of art and culture exhibits.

The Hellenic Music Research Lab of the Ionian University is also located at the Old Fortress.

== Film ==
The Fortress was the location of a scene from the James Bond film For Your Eyes Only in which the Mercedes of the evil adversary of Bond, Emile Locque, gets pushed off a cliff by Bond.
