= Siege of Corfu (1716) =

Part of the Seventh Ottoman–Venetian War

- Part of the Seventh Ottoman–Venetian War
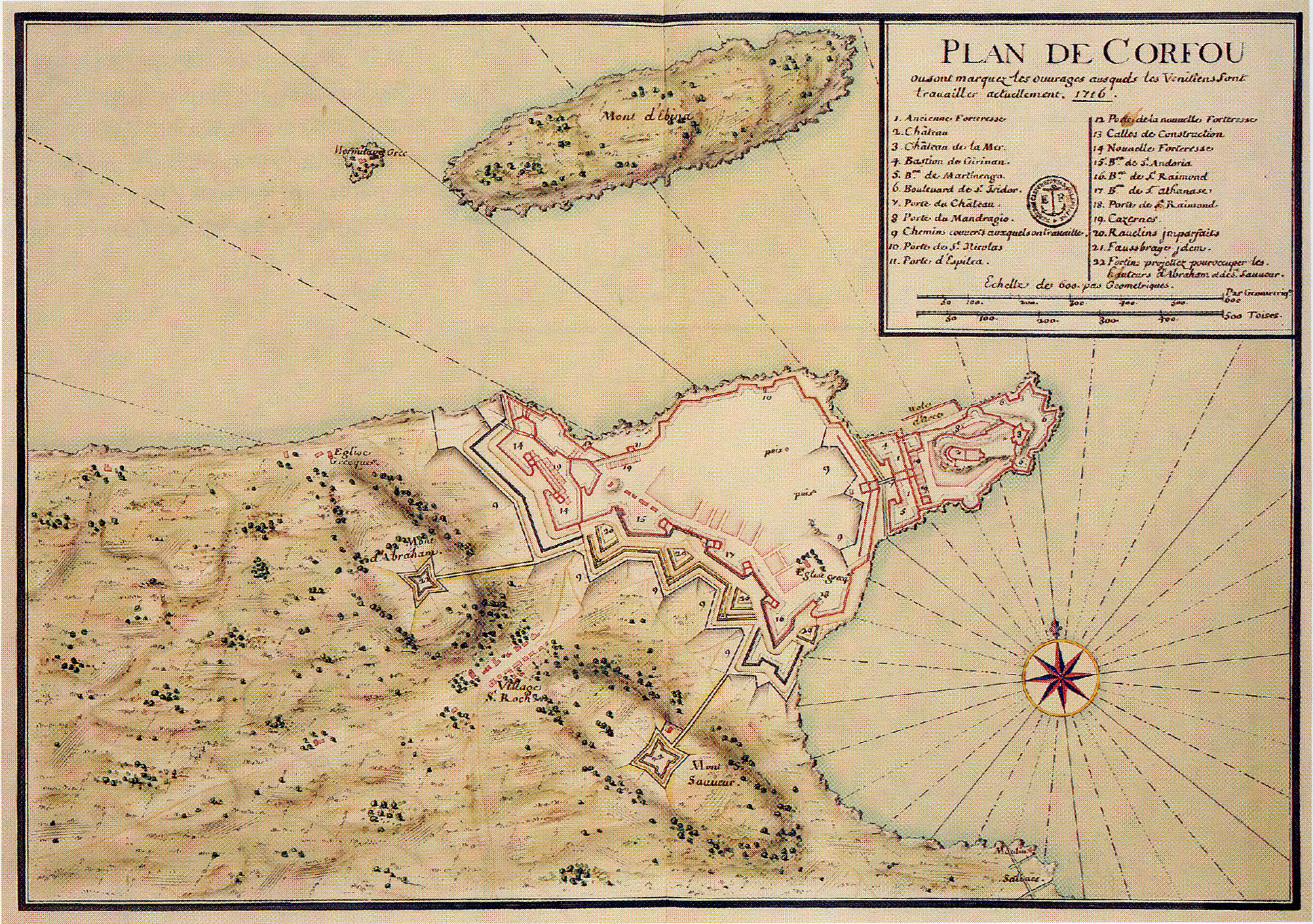
- The city fortifications of Corfu in 1716
Date	8 July – 21 August 1716
Location	Corfu 39°37′21″N 19°54′45″E
Result	Venetian victory

Belligerents
Republic of Venice; Order of Malta; Papal States; Spain; Tuscany	Ottoman Empire

Commanders and leaders
(Republic of Venice) Johann Matthias von der Schulenburg; (Republic of Venice) Andrea Pisani; (Republic of Venice) Antonio Loredan; (Republic of Venice) Andrea Corner; Relief: (Spain) Stefano de Mari (Spain) Baltasar Vélez de Guevara (Tuscany) Francesco Guidi (Papal States) Francesco Maria Ferretti (Sovereign Military Order of Malta) Jacques-Auguste de Bellefontaine	Canım Hoca Mehmed Pasha; Kara Mustafa Pasha; Muhtar Bey †

Strength
Corfu: 5,700 soldiers 26 ships 18 galleys 2 galleasses 12 galiots 2 fireships Relief fleet: 13 ships 13 galleys	33,000 soldiers 62 ships 15 galleys 4 fireships 2 bomb ships 11 transports

Casualties and losses
10,000 military losses Unknown number of civilians	15,000 dead 56 cannons 8 siege mortars
- Location of Corfu city within Greece

The siege of Corfu took place on 8 July – 21 August 1716, when the Ottoman Empire besieged the city of Corfu, on the namesake island, then held by the Republic of Venice. The siege was part of the Seventh Ottoman–Venetian War, and, coming in the aftermath of the lightning conquest of the Morea by the Ottoman forces in the previous year, was a major success for Venice, representing its last major military success and allowing it to preserve its rule over the Ionian Islands.

== Background ==
Following the Ottoman Empire's defeat in the second siege of Vienna in 1683, the Holy League of Linz gathered most European states (except for France, England and the Netherlands) in a common front against the Ottomans. In the resulting Great Turkish War (1684–1699) the Ottoman Empire suffered a number of defeats such as the battles of Mohács and Zenta, and in the Treaty of Karlowitz (1699), was forced to cede the bulk of Hungary to the Habsburg monarchy, Podolia to Poland-Lithuania, while Azov was taken by the Russian Empire. Further south, the Republic of Venice had launched its own attack on the Ottoman Empire in the same year the Great Turkish War broke out, seeking revenge for successive conquests of its overseas empire by the Turks, most recently (1669) the loss of Crete. During the conflict, Venetian troops seized the island of Lefkada (Santa Maura) and the Morea peninsula, although they failed to retake Crete and expand their possessions in the Aegean Sea.

After the Great Turkish War concluded the Ottomans were from the outset determined to reverse these losses, beginning a reform of their navy, while Venice found itself increasingly isolated diplomatically from the other European powers: the Holy League had fractured after its victory, and the War of the Spanish Succession (1701–1714) and the Great Northern War (1700–1721) preoccupied the attention of most European states. The Ottomans took advantage of the favourable international situation and secured their northern flank by defeating Russia. After the end of the Russo-Turkish war, the emboldened Ottoman leadership turned its focus on Venice, declaring war on 9 December 1714.

The opening move of the conflict was the invasion of the Venetian province in the Morea by the Ottoman Grand Vizier, Silahdar Damat Ali Pasha. Aided by Venetian military unpreparedness, the reluctance of its fleet to confront the more powerful Ottoman navy, and the reluctance of the local Greek population to assist the Venetians, the Ottomans quickly captured the entire peninsula in July–September 1715. At the same time, the Ottoman fleet, under the Kapudan Pasha Canım Hoca Mehmed Pasha, seized the Venetian-held islands of Tinos and Aigina: their Venetian governors surrendered without offering any resistance.

The Ottomans immediately shifted their attention towards the western coasts of the Greek mainland, threatening the Venetian Ionian Islands and the Republic's possessions in Dalmatia. The approach of the Ottoman fleet under the Kapudan Pasha forced the Venetian Provveditore Generale da Mar, Daniele Dolfin, to stay at Lefkada (Santa Maura) to protect the vulnerable island, located close to the mainland. However, this meant the loss of the southernmost of the Ionian Islands, Kythira (Cerigo): left without hopes of relief, it surrendered to the Kapudan Pasha in September. Shortly after, the Ottomans forced the capitulation of the last remaining Venetian island strongholds off Crete, Souda and Spinalonga. Dolfin tried to react by leading a foray into the Aegean, but unable to encounter the Ottoman fleet, he returned into the Ionian Sea. Disheartened, he abandoned Lefkada after destroying its fortifications and withdrew to Corfu. Lefkada was almost immediately captured by the Ottomans.

== Previous movements ==
=== Venetian preparations ===
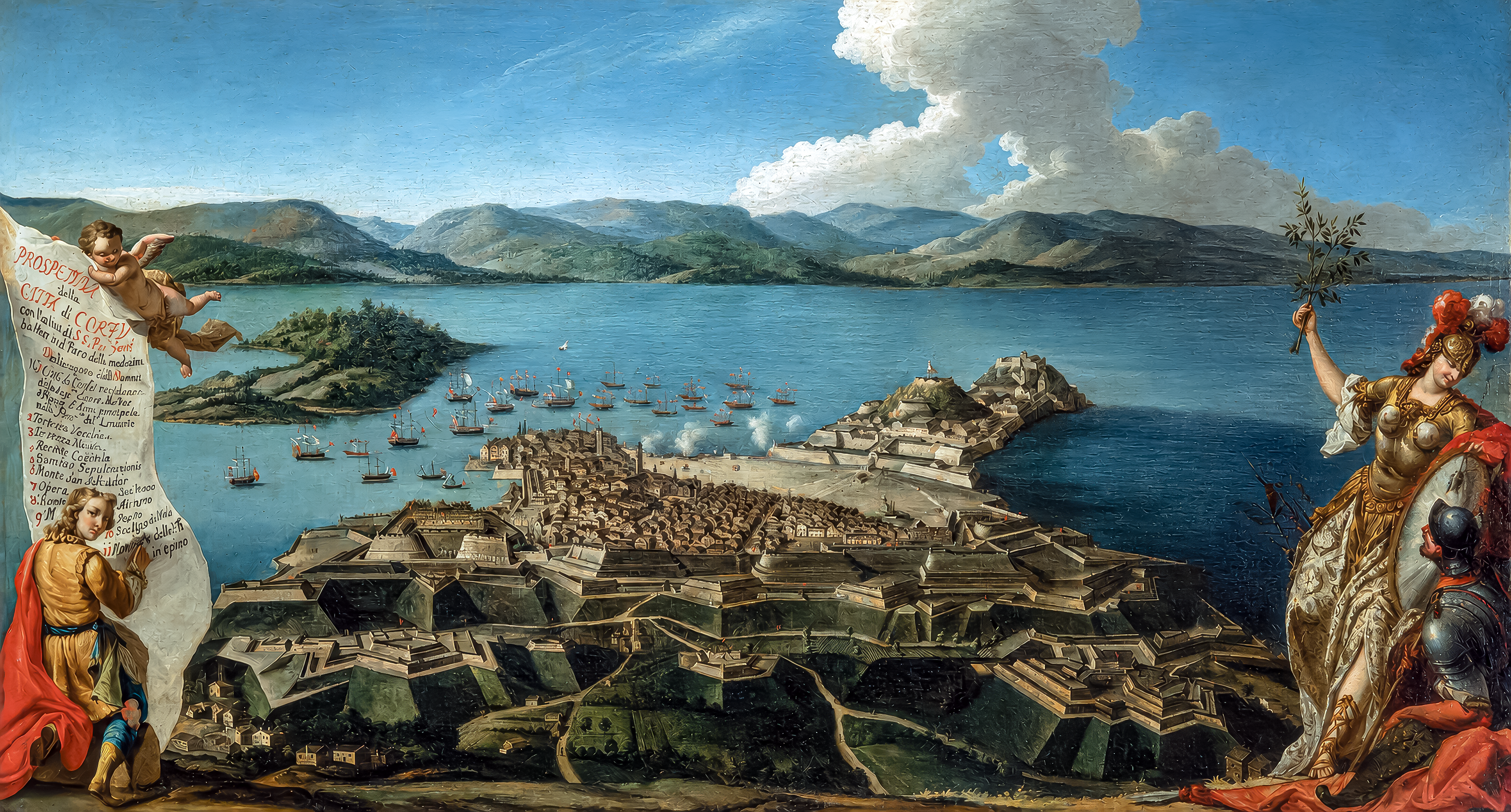
View of Corfu and its fortifications, with the Venetian fleet, c. 1700

The Venetians were well aware of Ottoman ambitions to capture the Ionian Islands, ambitions which dated to before the Great Turkish War. By 1716, it was clear that Corfu would be the next target. Preparing for the inevitable confrontation, the Venetian Senate replaced Dolfin, seen as too timid and ineffective, with Andrea Pisani, already in Corfu as Provveditore Generale da Mar. In early 1716, Pisani disposed of 18 galleys, two galleasses and 12 galleots, 26 ships of the line, and two fireships. In February, the Saxon field marshal, Count Johann Matthias von der Schulenburg arrived on the island as commander-in-chief of the Venetian forces. The fortifications of Corfu city, situated on a promontory in the middle of the island's eastern shore, had been neglected during the previous decades, as the extraordinary effort during the Morean War had left the Venetian treasury empty. Schulenburg set about strengthening the fortifications with palisades, trenches, and field works.

The threat of an imminent Ottoman invasion led many of the inhabitants of the Ionian Islands to flee, some to Dalmatia, and others to Italy and Sicily. At the same time, the Republic of Venice struggled to provide the funds and men required. On the outbreak of the conflict, the Venetians had called for aid from the other European states, but apart from the Crusading orders of the Knights Hospitaller and the Knights of St. Stephen, the major European powers responded only after the loss of the Morea. Some help began to arrive in spring 1716, as Portugal and Spain responded to Papal calls for a crusade by offering parts of their fleets for operations against the Ottomans. More importantly, the Austrians decided to enter the war against the Ottomans. In April, Prince Eugene of Savoy sent an ultimatum to cease hostilities and restore to Venice the territories accorded to her by the Treaty of Karlowitz, but the Ottomans rejected it and declared war in June.

In May, the Austrians warned Schulenburg that strong Ottoman forces under the serasker Merzifonlu Kara Mustafa Pasha—governor of Diyarbekir Eyalet and nephew of the namesake Grand Vizier who led the siege of Vienna in 1683—were assembling on the mainland coast across the island. At the same time, the Ottoman fleet under Canım Hoca Mehmed Pasha exited the Dardanelles into the Aegean. While keeping his rowed warships in Corfu, Pisani sent his more manoeuvrable ships of the line ahead, under the Capitano Straordinario delle Navi Andrea Corner, to observe the straits between the Morea and Crete for the Ottomans' approach. Corner slowly retreated in face of the much larger Ottoman fleet until Zakynthos (Zante). On 22 June, Pisani sent Corner to intercept the Ottoman fleet, but the Ottomans chose to bypass the straits between the Ionian Islands and the mainland and sail out into the open sea, rounding on Corfu from the northwest. Corner was left trying to catch up with the Ottomans, following them at a few days' distance.

=== Arrival of the Ottoman fleet ===
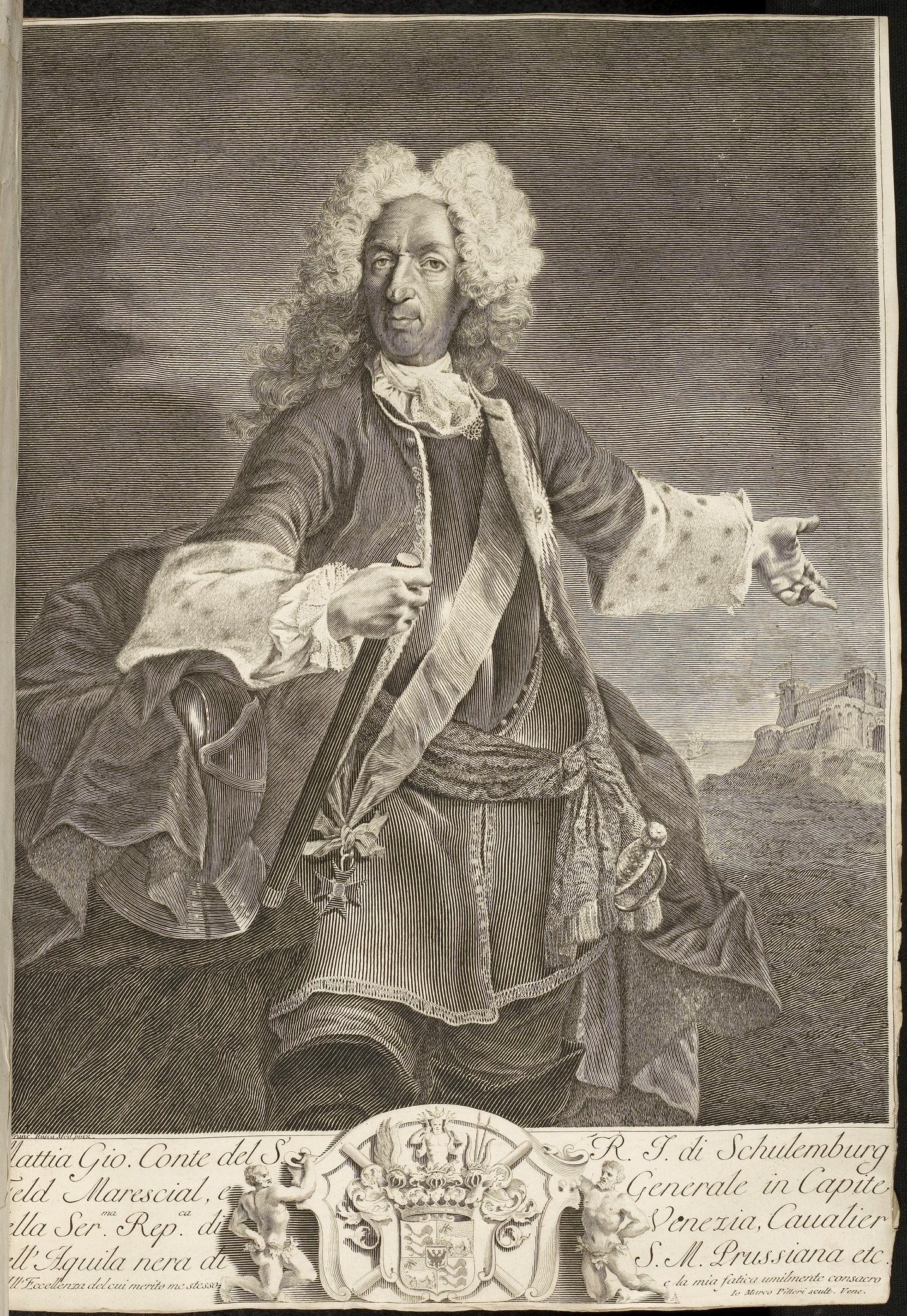
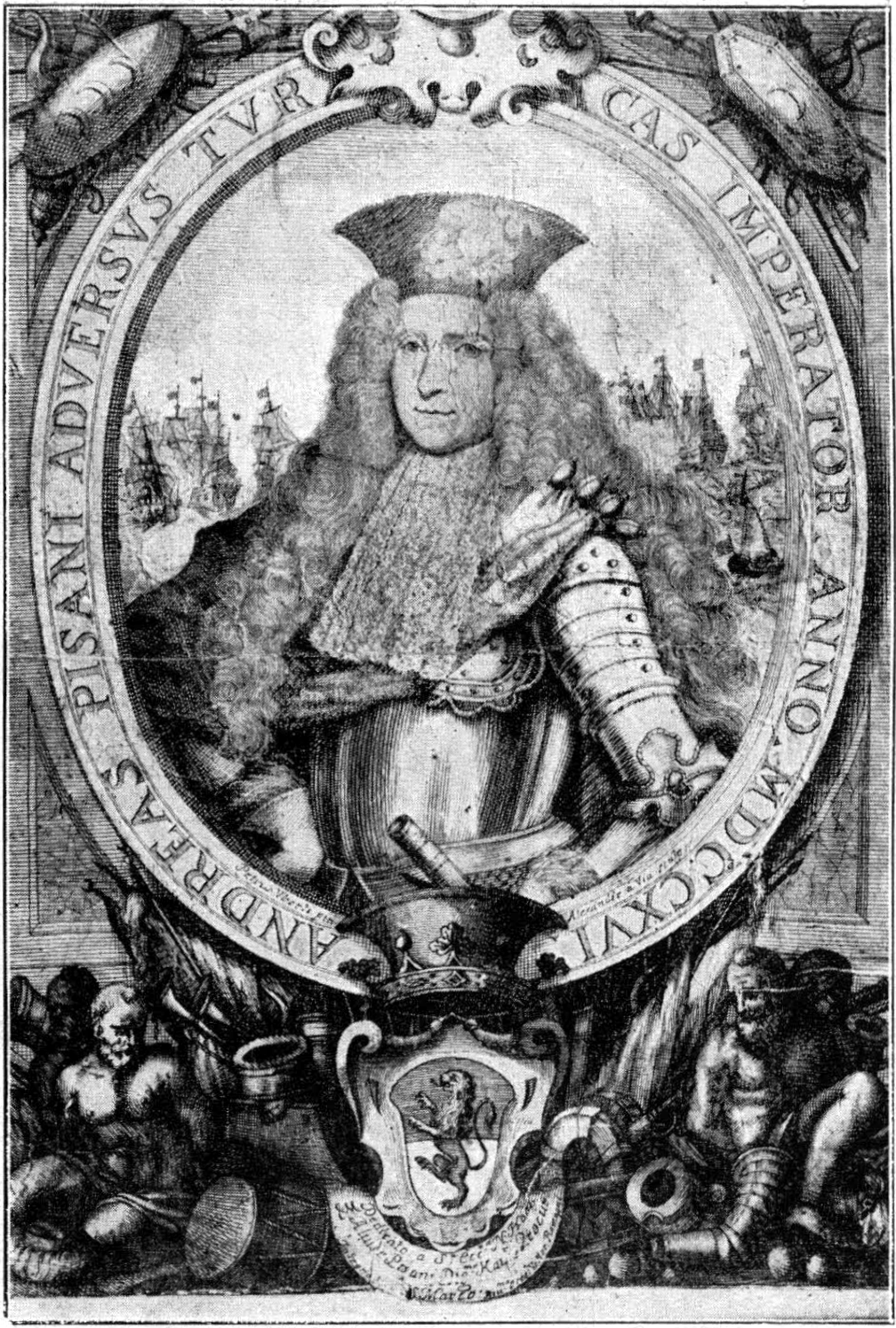
The two senior Venetian commanders, Count von der Schulenburg (left) of the land forces, and Andrea Pisani (right) of the navy

Passing by Zakynthos, the Ottoman admiral sent a letter demanding the island's submission, but did not otherwise divert his course. Likewise, only small detachments were landed at Cephalonia for small-scale raids, before the fleet moved on to Corfu, where it arrived on 5 July. The Ottomans anchored in the Corfu Channel, between the northeastern promontory of the island and the mainland, and began preparing for the siege. In the meantime, an Ottoman army of 30,000 infantry and 3,000 cavalry had gathered on the mainland shore at Butrint, ready to be ferried across the Corfu Channel by the fleet. Along with the fleet, the Ottomans were said to field no less than 2,000 cannon for the siege.

The news spread panic on the island: the villagers fled into the fortifications of Corfu city, while others tried to flee, on whatever vessel they could find, to Otranto. Soon the panic spread to the suburbs of the city itself, with their inhabitants also abandoning their homes to find refuge inside the fortifications. The situation became worse when Pisani, having to confront the far superior Ottoman fleet of 62 ships of the line with only his rowed vessels, decided not to risk a battle. After considering disembarking his crews to reinforce the garrison, he resolved to abandon his station in the Corfu Channel for the open sea, hoping to find Corner's squadron, which he had not heard from for 20 days.

Rumours spread that the fleet had abandoned the island to its fate, leading to the outbreak of looting of the empty houses, as well as cases of arson, and even killings as the looters clashed. Schulenburg, with the assistance of the Provveditore Generale da Mar, Antonio Loredan, tried to impose order while mustering his forces for the defence of the city: on 6 July, the Venetian commander disposed of about 1,000 German mercenaries, 400 Italian and 700 Dalmatian soldiers, 500 Corfiots, and 300 Greeks from other regions. The arrival of some 500 soldiers, under the Zakynthian captains Frangiskos Romas and the brothers Nikolaos and Frangiskos Kapsokefalos, represented a significant boost to Schulenburg's forces, but the situation remained problematic due to the low morale of the civilian population.

=== Preparation of the Christian relief ===
An international relief was called by Pope Innocent XIII at the urging of Emperor Charles VI, who supported Venice as part of the ongoing Austro-Turkish War, yet had his hands tied by his ongoing tension with King Philip V of Spain, his rival from the War of the Spanish Succession. Spanish prime minister Abbé Giulio Alberoni was seeking for a opening to recover the former Spanish territories of Naples, Sicily and Sardinia, where local populations were largely discontent with Charles' rule, meaning that Charles could not detract armies from Italy without an immediate threat of invasion from Spain. However, Alberoni ultimately led Spain to join the league to maintain his relationship with the pontiff, mobilizing his admirals Baltasar Vélez de Guevara and Stefano de Mari.

== Siege of Corfu ==
=== Ottoman landing ===
The Ottoman siege of the city began on 8 July, with landings of some 4,000 Janissaries and 6,000 other troops at Ypsos. On the evening of the same day, however, Corner's squadron arrived unexpectedly and attacked the Ottoman fleet, despite having only 27 ships to the Ottomans' 62. The ensuing naval battle was indecisive, but the sudden Venetian attack forced the Ottoman ships to cut their anchors and temporarily abandon their anchorage and interrupt their ferrying of the Ottoman troops. This bold action demonstrated the Venetians' determination to defend Corfu, and also raised hopes about the island's ability to resist the Ottomans; for a time, it seemed even possible that the Venetian fleet might hinder the passage of fresh Ottoman troops, and allow those already present on the island to be cut off. As a result, the mood of the population swung into enthusiastic support for the defence, and many hundreds volunteered to assist in building fortifications, man artillery pieces, or enlisted in militias.

On 10 July, the Ottoman ships recommenced landing troops, a process which continued without the Venetians making any attempt to interrupt it. Clashes with the Canım Hoca Mehmed's men on the island continued over the next few days, as reinforcements started arriving for the defenders and the Ottomans alike: on 18 July Pisani returned to the island with a new, eighty-gun warship, two transports with 1,500 men, and a ship with food, while shortly after the troops of the serasker also began landing on the island. The Ottoman forces were able to expand their occupation in the interior, pressing the inhabitants of the villages they captured into erecting field works. On 21 July, the Ottomans reached the suburbs of Mantouki and Gastrades.

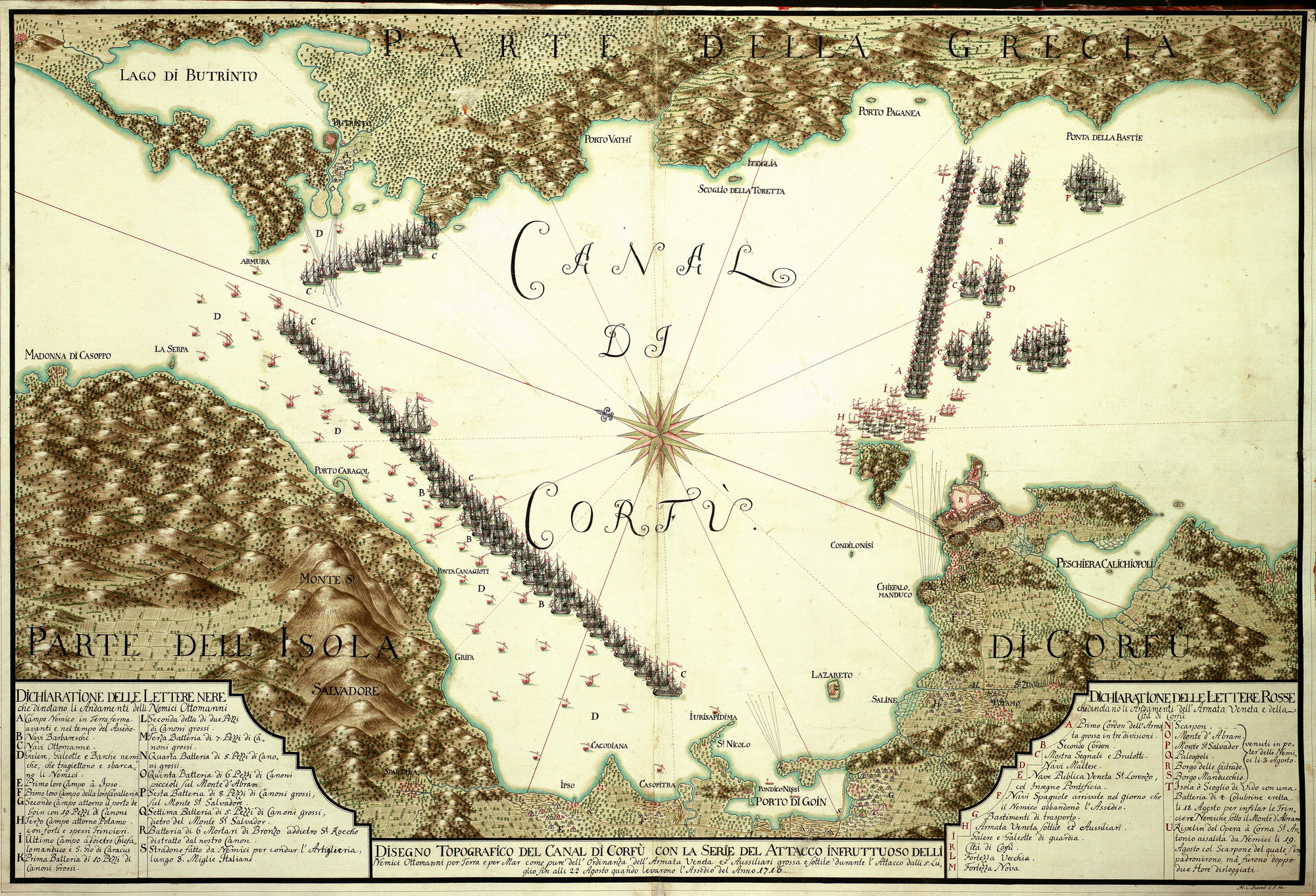
Sketch of the confrontation of the Ottoman (left) and Venetian (right) fleets in the Corfu Channel during the siege

=== Christian reinforcements ===
On the next day, the first ships of Venice's Christian allies appeared of Cape Lefkimmi in the south: nine ships of the Knights of Malta, the vanguard of a much larger Christian fleet composed of ships from the Papal States, the Republic of Genoa, Spain, and the Grand Duchy of Tuscany. On 31 July, four Papal, two Genoese, three Tuscan and five Spanish galleys arrived, along with four ships of the line hired by the Pope. Their arrival helped to prevent the Ottoman fleet from attacking the fortress from the northeast, and kept the sea open for supplies to reach Corfu city.

At the same time, the Ottoman forces on the island were making progress, capturing the fort of the Saviour (San Salvatore) and the hill of Abramios (Monte Abramo) to the west of the city. On 5 August, the serasker issued a demand for the Venetians' surrender, threatening to massacre the garrison and flatten the city otherwise. Schulenburg rejected the demand, but the defenders were in dire straits, as they had suffered heavy losses and much of their artillery had been destroyed. On the same day, the Venetian fleet moved to engage the Ottomans, but at the last moment, the wind shifted, giving the Ottomans the advantage, forcing the Venetians to break off. Schulenburg proposed a sortie of the garrison for 6 July, but Pisani refused to co-operate and the project was shelved.

On 8 August, the situation began to change in favour of the defenders, as 1,500 troops with ample supplies and ammunition arrived to bolster the garrison, bringing with them news of the Austrian victory at the Battle of Petrovaradin on 5 August. As a result, on the night of 18/19 August, the Venetians sortied against the Ottoman lines supported by fire from the galleys on both sides of the city. As the German contingent failed in its objectives, and the sortie was pushed back. In turn, on the morning of 19 August, the Janissaries launched a mass assault on the fortifications, overrunning the bastion of St. Athanasios and part of the outer fortified belt and reaching the Scarpon Gate, where they hosted their banners. Schulenburg led a counterattack in person, and managed to push the Ottomans back. On the next day, a storm broke out that wrought havoc with both fleets; some of the Christian ships unmoored by the winds and thrown towards the shore, while the Ottoman fleet suffered somewhat heavier losses.

=== Withdrawal of the Ottoman fleet ===
Undeterred, the Ottomans reorganized their forces on 20 August to resume their assault on the fortification, but on the next day, a Spanish squadron of six ships of the line commanded by De Mari appeared on the horizon. During the night, the defenders could see much activity in the Ottoman lines, and fully expected to face another general assault on the next day; instead, come morning they found the Ottoman lines deserted. The Ottomans had abandoned the siege and began boarding their ships, in such haste that they left behind many supplies and much equipment, including some of the heaviest siege guns.

The Ottomans' rushed escape presented an ideal opportunity for a Venetian attack, but Pisani refused to do so, contenting himself withdrawing his ships up in a line to block the southern exit of the Channel. When he did try to attack on 23 August, contrary wind prevented him from coming close to the Ottoman fleet, and on 24 August he returned to passively keeping watch over the southern exit of the Channel. Pisani's reluctance to engage may be explained by past experience, which had shown that the management of the Venetians' Christian allies in battle was a difficult matter. This allowed Canım Hoca Mehmed Pasha to move his fleet north to Butrint, and thence exit the Channel from the north and then sail south along the western coast of Greece and return to the safety of the Dardanelles. Pisani's fleet followed the Ottomans at a distance, while most of the other Christian ships, apart from the Knights of Malta, left in early September, once it became clear that the Ottomans were gone.

The reason for the Ottoman withdrawal is still debated: some consider the arrival of the Spanish squadron, and news of the imminent arrival of an additional Portuguese squadron of nine ships, to have been decisive; other accounts tell of a mutiny in the besieging army; but the most likely reason is that, in the aftermath of the losses suffered at Petrovaradin, the serasker received urgent orders to wrap up operations so that his men could replenish the Ottoman forces in the northern Balkans. The Ottomans lost some 15,000 dead in Corfu, along with 56 cannons and eight siege mortars, and large quantities of material, which they abandoned. The total losses, civilian and military, on the defenders' side, were 30,000.

== Aftermath ==
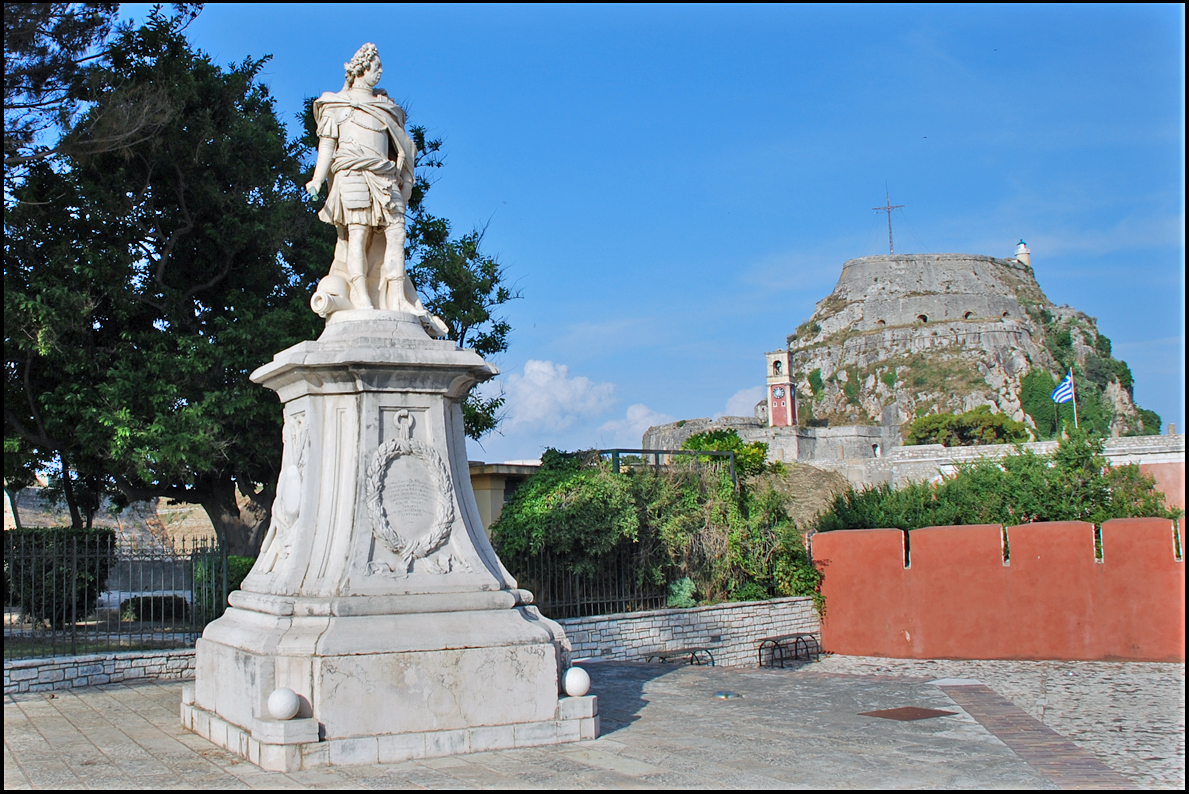
Statue erected to Schulenburg in front of the Old Fortress, Corfu

The Corfiots attributed the Ottoman withdrawal to the intervention of their patron saint, Saint Spyridon, and the "miraculous" storm, while Venice celebrated the last major battlefield success in its history, heaping honours on Schulenburg similar to those enjoyed by Francesco Morosini after his conquest of the Morea a generation earlier. He received a lifelong stipend of 5,000 ducats and a sword of honour, as well as a monument erected in his honour in front of the gateway to the Old Fortress in Corfu. The defence of Corfu was also commemorated in Venice with the erection of a fourth stone lion at the entrance of the Venetian Arsenal, with the inscription "anno Corcyrae liberatae".

As the Ottoman troops withdrew into the Balkan hinterland, Schulenburg and Loredan led 2,000 men to the mainland coast, and on 2 September recaptured the town of Butrint, one of the mainland exclaves of the Ionian Islands. Two months later, the Venetian fleet recaptured Lefkada. The arrival of naval reinforcements allowed the Venetian navy to engage the Ottoman fleet with more confidence. Christian victories in the Battle of Imbros (16 June 1717) and the Battle of Matapan (19 July 1717) removed the danger of a new Ottoman expedition in the Ionian Sea, and allowed the recovery of the two last mainland exclaves, Preveza and Vonitsa, on 19 October 1717 and 4 November 1717 respectively.

Despite the successes, Venice was exhausted. The Austrians, buoyed by their victories, were unwilling to discuss terms, until the Spanish launched an attack on the Habsburg possessions in Italy by sending the very fleet ostensibly being prepared to aid Venice to capture Sardinia in July 1717, and another to invade Sicily a year later. Faced with this stab in the back, the Austrians agreed to negotiations with the Ottomans, leading to the Treaty of Passarowitz (21 July 1718), in which Austria made considerable gains. Venice had to acknowledge the loss of the Morea, Tinos, and Aigina, but managed to retain the Ionian Islands and their mainland exclaves.

The oratorio Juditha triumphans by Antonio Vivaldi is said to be an allegory of the victory of the Venetians over the Ottomans.

== Sources ==
- Anderson, R. C. (1952). Naval Wars in the Levant 1559–1853. Princeton: Princeton University Press.
- Chasiotis, Ioannis (1975). "Η κάμψη της Οθωμανικής δυνάμεως" [The decline of Ottoman power]. In Christopoulos, Georgios A. & Bastias, Ioannis K. (eds.). Ιστορία του Ελληνικού Έθνους [History of the Greek Nation] (in Greek). Vol. ΙΑ: Ο Ελληνισμός υπό ξένη κυριαρχία (περίοδος 1669 - 1821), Τουρκοκρατία - Λατινοκρατία [Hellenism under Foreign Rule (Period 1669 - 1821), Turkocracy – Latinocracy]. Athens: Ekdotiki Athinon. pp. 8–51. ISBN 978-960-213-100-8.
- Nani Mocenigo, Mario (1935). Storia della marina veneziana: da Lepanto alla caduta della Repubblica [History of the Venetian navy: from Lepanto to the fall of the Republic] (in Italian). Rome: Tipo lit. Ministero della Marina – Uff. Gabinetto.
- Prelli, Alberto; Mugnai, Bruno (2016). L'ultima vittoria della Serenissima: 1716 – L'assedio di Corfù (in Italian). Bassano del Grappa: itinera progetti. ISBN 978-88-88542-74-4.
- Prescott, William (1889). History of the reign of Ferdinand and Isabella, the Catholic, Tomo 13. Little and Brown.
- Setton, Kenneth Meyer (1991). Venice, Austria, and the Turks in the Seventeenth Century. Philadelphia, Massachusetts: The American Philosophical Society. ISBN 0-87169-192-2.
