= Muhtar Pasha =

Ottoman governor of Euboea from 1788 to 1822

Ruler of Karli-Eli and Eğriboz
- In office 1788–1822

Personal details
- Born: Ottoman Empire
- Relations: Veli Pasha (Brother), Veli Bey (Grandfather), Hussein (son)
- Parent(s): Ali Pasha of Janina (Father), Emine (Mother)

Muhtar Pasha (also Mukhtar Pasha, born before 1770) was an Ottoman Albanian ruler and the son of Ali Pasha of the increasingly independent Pashalik of Yanina. He was appointed governor of the Sanjak of Karli-Eli and the Sanjak of Eğriboz in 1792, stretching Ali's control down to Livadia and the Gulf of Corinth, except Attica. He also became governor of the Sanjak of Ohrid in 1796–7, and of the Sanjak of Vlorë and Berat in 1810.

== Biography ==
A member of the Albanian Meçohysaj clan, Muhtar was the first son of Ali Pasha and his wife Emine, the daughter of Kaplan Pasha of Gjirokastër. Happy and open in his youth, Muhtar grew up to be gloomy and ferocious as an adult and led an intemperate lifestyle; English archaeologist and writer Charles Robert Cockerell, who spent time in Ali Pasha's court and realm, contrasted Muhtar's lifestyle with Ali's austere sobriety, and noted that he lacked the grace and conversational abilities of his father but was still in good-humour.

Muhtar was given powerful positions, as well as control over Karli-Eli and Euboea in 1792. In that same year, Muhtar aided his father in commanding his campaign against the Souliotes. In 1794, three daughters of Ibrahim Pasha of Vlorë and Berat were married to Muhtar, his brother Veli, and Ali's nephew Mahmud Bey respectively to improve the relations between the pashaliks of Ali and Ibrahim. Ali's relationship with Muhtar at this time was less cordial than his relationship with his other son, Veli.

In 1796, upon the death of Kara Mahmud Bushati of Shkodër in the battle of Krusi during his invasion of modern-day Montenegro, one of his holdings, the Sanjak of Ohrid, temporarily passed to Muhtar, formalizing the spread of Ali Pasha's influence in the north. During the winter of 1797-1798, Ali was forced to deal with regional conflicts at the request of the Ottomans, particularly against the rebel governor Osman Pazvantoğlu who had begun carving out his own polity centred around Vidin in modern Bulgaria. The Ottomans had already dispatched an army to deal with Pazvantoğlu and sent for Ali's help, and although he tried to avoid attending the campaign so as to avoid appearing subservient to the Sultan in the face of his new French allies, he was ultimately forced to attend with an army of 20,000 Albanians and left Muhtar in charge in Janina. When the French declared war on the Ottomans and initiated their invasion of Egypt, they also attempted to incite revolts in Epirus, particularly amongst the Souliotes. As Ali was still on campaign in the Danube, Muhtar kept his father informed regarding the subversive activities of the French, which prompted Ali to obtain dispensation from the Sultan and return home to deal with the issue.

After conquering Butrint and Igoumenitsa from the French, Ali attacked the town of Preveza in October 1798. In the ensuing battle for the town, which occurred on the 12th of October, Muhtar himself led a cavalry charge, and Ali's troops emerged victorious. Ali then ordered the execution of a number of captives, but the commander of the French engineers, officer Louis-Auguste Camus de Richemont, was spared after Muhtar's personal intervention, as Muhtar had been impressed by his bravery.

Ali Pasha's third son, Selim, was born to one of Ali's slaves at the end of 1802. Muhtar was delivered the news by a Tatar messenger, and upon hearing that he had a brother, Muhtar shot the messenger dead on the spot. Around 1805, Ali Pasha's forces seized Elbasan and Muhtar took his residency there. In 1808, Muhtar was dispatched at the head of an army of 4,000 soldiers to destroy the klephts, who had begun to revolt against Ali Pasha and raid his holdings. The klephts were crushed, and their leaders were captured, executed or exiled. After Sultan Selim III was assassinated in that same year, a period of chaos ensued across the Ottoman Empire in which Ali occupied Attica by force. Meanwhile, as war on the Danubian front continued, Ali sent Muhtar and Veli to participate in the Ottoman campaigns in that region. In 1810, Muhtar was installed as the pasha of the newly-acquired Berat and Vlorë, with Omer Vrioni being appointed as its governor.

In 1811, the Ottomans expected Ali and his sons to reinforce them in the Danube region with tens of thousands of soldiers - of which Muhtar was expected to supply 10,000 - to aid in their war with the Russians, but Ali, likely fearing that he would be imprisoned or killed by the Ottomans, refused and cited old age and illness as an excuse. Nonetheless, Muhtar and Veli still went, and tensions between the brothers and their father at this point in time were high. Whilst they were deployed in Sofia, the brothers asked for Ali's trusted courtier Haxhi Shehreti to visit them in confidence multiple times, but Ali was reluctant as he began to think that they intended to conspire against him.

In 1812, as Napoleon retreated from Russia, Ali Pasha saw an opportunity to seize Parga and sent his son Muhtar, his nephew Daut Bey, Omer Vrioni, Agos Vasiaris and 6,000 men to lay siege to the island. After a long and protracted siege and under the new British owners of Parga, Ali finally managed to obtain the town in May 1819 after agreeing to pay £150,000 in compensation to the 3,000-4,000 inhabitants who wished to leave the island.

In 1819, after the Sublime Porte was made aware by Ali Pasha's former ally Ismail Pashabey that Ali's son Veli was depriving the government of its revenues from Thessaly, Veli was deposed from his position there and transferred to the small pashalik of Lepanto, which was previously held by Muhtar and which he now had to give up to his brother. By this time, the Ottomans had become extremely concerned by Ali Pasha's growing ambitions, and in July 1820, the Sultan issued an ultimatum to Ali Pasha demanding that he present himself in Constantinople within forty days. Ali failed to show, and the Ottoman forces began to mobilize under Ismail Pashabey, who was to assemble a large army of troops under the pashas of Shkodër and Larissa. Ali prepared to defend himself by fortifying strategic positions in the mountains under his captains Omer Vrioni and Odysseas Androutsos, while Muhtar and his second son Hussein Bey were tasked with defending Berat and Tepelene respectively from Mustafa Pasha Bushatli of Shkodër.

The approaching Ottoman forces managed to gain control of the sea after defeating a Greek fleet, and the loyalty of Ali's men increasingly wavered as the strength of their opposition became clear. Rather than remain in permanent opposition against the Sultan alongside their father, Ali's sons ultimately abandoned his cause on the promises of pardons or other pashaliks from the Sultan. Muhtar surrendered Berat whilst Gjirokastër soon fell to the Ottomans, resulting in the capture of Ali's third son Selim. Only Hussein Bey, Muhtar's second son, swore to die for his grandfather and continue the resistance.

After Ali's death at the hands of Ottoman soldiers in the Monastery of St Panteleimon on the island in Lake Pamvotis in Janina, his head was posthumously cut off, its skin peeled off for transportation in the usual manner, stuffed with straw and moistened for presentation. Ali's head was then sent to Constantinople, where it was displayed to the public on the gates of the Sultan's palace alongside the heads of his three sons, including Muhtar, and grandson who were also executed. Ali's head was buried with his deceased sons and grandson in the tombs outside the Selvyria gate in Constantinople.

During his time as a member of the political elite of the Pashalik of Janina, Muhtar was a member of Ali's war council, which was made up primarily of his most trusted Albanians, and he was also able to run his own court financed from the income he made as Pasha of Berat. Ioannis Kolettis was recorded to have been a personal physician of Muhtar upon his return from Italy. French diplomat and writer François Pouqueville noted that Muhtar and Veli maintained retinues of different types of entertainers drawn from across Europe.

== Bibliography ==
- Mazower, Mark (2021). The Greek Revolution: 1821 and the Making of Modern Europe (Hardback). Allen Lane. ISBN 978-0-241-00410-4.
- Papageorgiou, Stefanos P. (2014). "The attitude of the Beys of the Albanian Southern Provinces (Toskaria) towards Ali Pasha Tepedelenli and the Sublime Porte (mid-18th-mid-19th centuries)". Cahiers balkaniques. 42. doi:10.4000/ceb.3520.
- Russell, Quentin; Russell, Eugenia (30 September 2017). Ali Pasha, Lion of Ioannina: The Remarkable Life of the Balkan Napoleon. Pen and Sword. ISBN 978-1-4738-7722-1.
