= Andrea Pisani (admiral) =

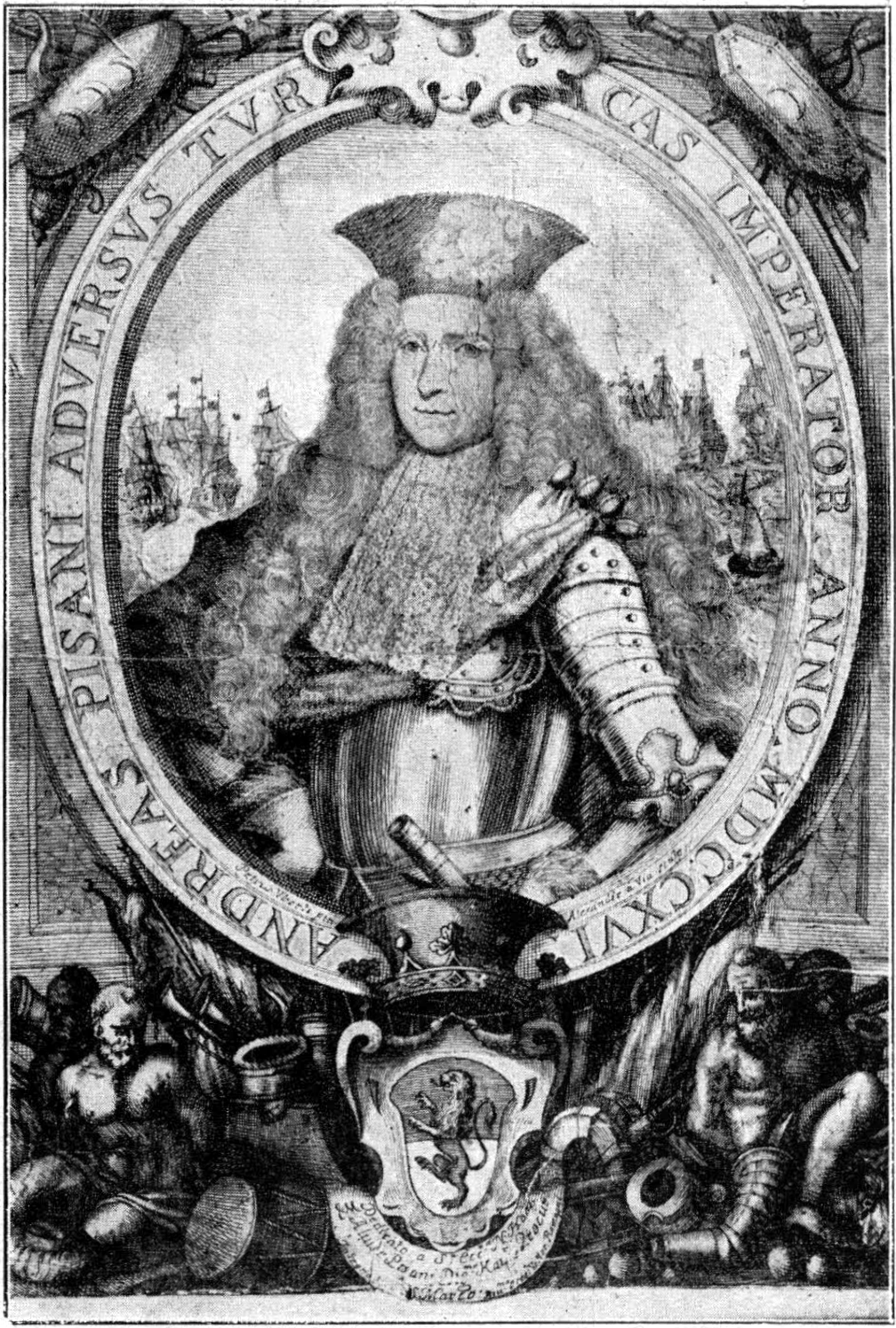
- Andrea Pisani as Captain General of the Sea, 1716
- Born: 1662; Venice
- Died: 21 September 1718 (aged 55–56); Corfu
- Relatives: Alvise Pisani
- Military career
- Allegiance: Holy Roman Empire (1682–1683); Republic of Venice (1683–1718)
- Branch: Army of the Holy Roman Empire; Venetian navy
- Rank: Captain General of the Sea
- Conflicts: Morean War: Oinousses, Andros; Seventh Ottoman–Venetian War: Siege of Corfu
- Awards: Knight of the Order of the Golden Stola

Andrea Pisani (1662 in Venice – 21 September 1718 in Corfu) was a Venetian noble who served as Captain General of the Sea during the Seventh Ottoman–Venetian War.

== Biography ==
Andrea Pisani was born in Venice in 1662, to a noble family belonging to the Venetian patriciate. He was the son of Gianfrancesco Pisani and Paolina Contarini. (Note: The couple had five other sons, Carlo (1655-1740), Ermolao, the future Doge Alvise, Lorenzo, and Marcantonio)

During his youth, he was banished from Venice on the orders of the Council of Ten (25 August 1682), for having perpetrated indecent acts against the Sisters of Sant Catherine the Virgin Martyr in Brescia. In order to redeem himself, he enlisted as a volunteer in the Imperial army operating in Hungary during the Siege of Buda. In the next year, he returned to Venice, enlisting in the Venetian navy under the captain (Governator di Nave) Pietro Zaguri.

In 1693, he was appointed paymaster under the Doge and Captain General of the Sea Francesco Morosini. In 1695, he took part in the naval Battle of the Oinousses Islands, under the command of Captain General Giovanni Antonio Zeno against the Ottoman fleet, and in the next year he fought in the Battle of Andros under Captain General Alessandro Molin.

On his return to Venice, he was elected to the Venetian Senate. As senator, he occupied several different magistratures, until returning to military duties in 1715, with the outbreak of the Seventh Ottoman–Venetian War, when he was appointed Provveditore Generale delle Isole, and later Captain General of the Sea. In 1716, he participated in the successful defence of Corfu, and recaptured Butrint and Santa Maura.

In 1717, he distinguished himself in the battle off Passavas, along with his brother Carlo: aboard a small felucca, Pisani passed through the enemy ships in full action, reorganized his own ships of the line, and encouraged his troops. Once back in Santa Maura, he busied himself with its re-fortification, alongside Count Johann Matthias von der Schulenburg. He then recovered Preveza and Vonitsa, for which he was awarded by the Senate the Knighthood of the Order of the Golden Stola.

In 1718, he was besieging Dulcigno when news arrived of the Treaty of Passarowitz. He lifted the siege and returned with the fleet to Corfu. On 21 September 1718, he was killed in an explosion caused when a thunderbolt struck a gunpowder magazine. His body was transported to Venice, where his funeral took place; he was buried on the island of La Certosa.

== Sources ==
- Candiani, Guido Candiani (2009). I vascelli della Serenissima: guerra, politica e costruzioni navali a Venezia in età moderna, 1650-1720 (in Italian). Venezia: Istituto Veneto di Scienze, Lettere e Arti.
- Candiani, Guido (2012). Dalla galea alla nave di linea: le trasformazioni della marina veneziana (1572-1699) (in Italian). Novi Ligure: Città del Silenzio.
- Cicogna, Emmanuele Antonio (1827). Delle inscrizioni veneziane raccolte ed illustrate da Emmanuele Antonio Cicogna cittadino veneto. Vol. II (in Italian). Venice: Giuseppe Picotti Stampatore.
- Ercole, Guido (2006). Duri i banchi. Le navi della Serenissima 421-1797 (in Italian). Gardolo: Gruppo Modellismo Trentino di studio e ricerca storica.
- Ferrari, Girolamo (1723). Delle notizie storiche della Lega tra l'Imperatore Carlo VI e la Repubblica di Venezia contra il Gran Sultano Achmet III e de' loro fatti d'arme dall'anno 1714 sino alla Pace di Passarowitz (in Italian). Venezia: Presso Carlo Buonarrigo.
- Levi, Cesare Augusto (1896). Navi da guerra costruite nell'Arsenale di Venezia dal 1664 al 1896 (in Italian). Venezia: Stabilimento Tipografico Fratelli Visentini.
