= Siege of Vidin (1798) =

Ottoman siege on Vidin in 1798

Date	April–October 1798
Location	Vidin, Ottoman Empire
Result	Ottoman failure

Belligerents
Ottoman Empire	Pashalik of Vidin

Commanders and leaders
(Ottoman Empire) Küçük Hüseyin Pasha (Ottoman Empire) Ali Pasha of Ioannina (Ottoman Empire) Hadji Mustafa Pasha	Osman Pazvantoğlu

Strength
(Ottoman Empire) 40,000–100,000 soldiers (Ottoman Empire) 40 artillery pieces (Ottoman Empire) 15 gunboats	10,000–12,000 soldiers

Casualties and losses
(Ottoman Empire) Considerable	Unknown

The siege of Vidin was a siege by the Ottoman Empire aimed at subduing Osman Pazvantoğlu, a regional governor who had declared de facto independence and rebelled against Ottoman authority.

== Background ==
In 1795, Osman Pazvantoğlu revolted against the Ottoman Empire. His forces consisted of mercenaries, Albanian irregulars, and Janissaries from Bosnia and Serbia. Initially, he captured much of northwest Bulgaria and conducted raids into central and eastern Rumelia, as well as parts of Wallachia and the Belgrade Pashalik.

In response, the Ottoman Empire launched a campaign with 40,000 soldiers and besieged Vidin from 1795 to 1796, but the siege failed. Pazvantoğlu's raids continued until 1797, when an Ottoman army led by Ali Pasha of Ioannina defeated his forces and restricted his control to the Vidin region.

== Siege ==
After multiple failed campaigns against Osman Pazvantoğlu, Sultan Selim III appointed Küçük Hüseyin Pasha to lead an Ottoman army estimated between 40,000 (low end) and 100,000. This included 20,000 troops reluctantly sent by Ali Pasha of Ioannina, who hesitated to appear subservient to the Sultan, particularly in front of French observers. Ali even tried to avoid compliance by having Karpenisi residents petition the Patriarch of Constantinople, citing fears of bandits if he left the region, but his efforts were unsuccessful.

On 5 February 1798, Hüseyin’s army marched on Vidin and fully encircled it by mid-April. Hüseyin offered Pazvantoğlu terms of surrender, guaranteeing his life and dignity. Pazvantoğlu refused, reportedly stating he could defeat Hüseyin with 100,000 troops but preferred to do so with only 10,000.

The siege was plagued by setbacks, including repelled assaults, the destruction of the Ottoman gunboat fleet, and outbreaks of disease and desertion. On 1 June, the French invasion of Egypt forced the Ottomans to divert resources south. A final night assault in autumn ended in disaster as Ottoman forces mistakenly fired on each other. By late October 1798, the siege was abandoned, and the army withdrew to focus on the Egyptian crisis.

To shift blame for the failure of the siege, Hüseyin accused Aljo Pasha of treason, had him beheaded, and sent his head to Constantinople.

== Aftermath ==
In 1799, Osman Pazvantoğlu was pardoned by the Sultan and officially recognized as the governor of Vidin. He was granted the titles of Pasha and Vizier.
