= Veli Pasha =

Ottoman governor and commander (1787–1822)

Governor of the Sanjak of Tirhala; Pasha of Morea
- In office 1807–1812

Personal details
- Born: c. 1770
- Died: 1822
- Relations: Muhtar Pasha (Brother), Muhtar Bey (great-grandfather), Kaplan Pasha of Gjirokastër (Grandfather), Mustafa Yussuf (great great grandfather), Fikret İşmen Kaygı (descendant) Husein Pasha (descendant) Fatma Hikmet İşmen (descendant)
- Children: Mehmed (son); Ismail (son)
- Parent(s): Ali Pasha of Ioannina (Father), Emine (Mother)

Military service
- Battles/wars: First Serbian Uprising

Veli Pasha (Albanian: Veli Pasha; c. 1770–1822; fl. 1787–1822) was an Ottoman Albanian ruler and the second born of Ali Pasha of Ioannina of the increasingly independent Pashalik of Yanina. As an Ottoman commander, he is known for his participation in military actions against the Souliotes, the Septinsular Republic, and the Serbian rebels. He was appointed governor of the Sanjak of Tirhala in 1787, and became Pasha of the Morea Eyalet in 1807.

== History ==
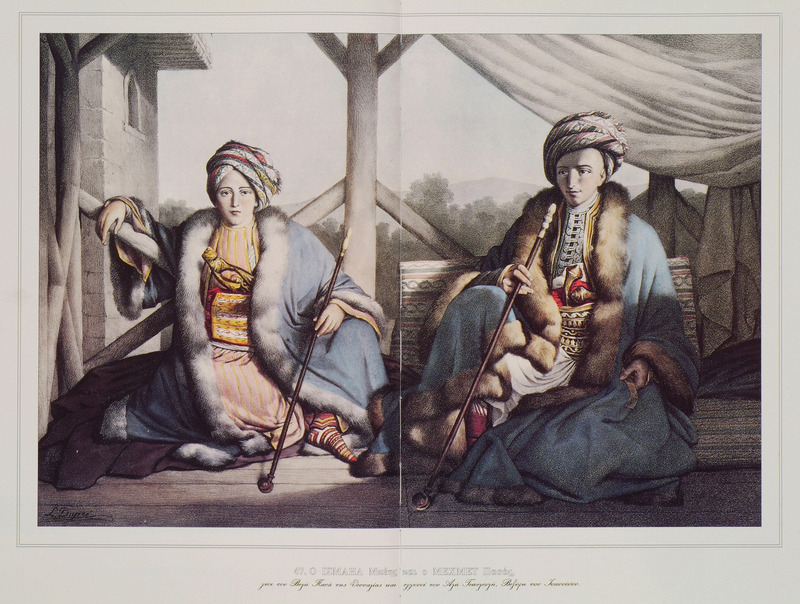
Ismail Bey and Mehmed Pasha, the sons of Veli Pasha and grandsons of Ali Pasha, by Louis Dupré (1827).

A member of the Meçohysaj clan, Veli was the second son of Ali Pasha and his wife Emine, the daughter of Kaplan Pasha of Gjirokastër. Veli was a well-educated man and fluent in Albanian, Greek, Turkish and Italian. In 1787 or 1788, following his father's conquest of Ioannina and formation of the Pashalik of Yanina, a 17-year-old Veli was appointed by Ali as ruler of the Sanjak of Trikala with the title Pasha of Trikala. Three daughters of Ibrahim Pasha of Vlorë and Berat were married to Veli, his brother Muhtar, and Ali's nephew Mahmud Bey respectively to improve the relations between the pashaliks of Ali and Ibrahim. Veli married Ibrahim's daughter Zeivenie in 1794, and he later married a second wife, Zybeide H. Vlora, the daughter of Sylejman Pasha. Ali's relationship with Veli at this time was more cordial than his relationship with his other son, Muhtar, and contemporary sources attest to genuine affection between Veli and his father. On his wedding or soon after, Veli was awarded the title of Pasha.

Veli's father Ali Pasha had plans of conquering the Ionian Islands off of the coast of Epirus, but after the Ottoman Empire joined the Second Coalition against France, they side-lined Ali when a Russian-Turkish fleet moved to capture the Ionian Islands from the French. Ali's attempts to negotiate control of the island of Santa Maura were interrupted by the arrival of this fleet. Ali, Veli and Ibrahim Pasha were obliged by the Ottomans to contribute to the siege directly, albeit in a diversionary role.

In 1803, his father sent him with an army to fight and finally subdue the Souliotes. Veli arranged for the surrender of the Souliotes with their leader Fotos Tzavelas. The Souliotes, numbering to 4,000 survivors, agreed to abandon Suli and left to find refuge in Parga and the Ionian Islands as their four villages were destroyed. Some, however, trusted in the truce with Veli and remained. As a reward for the destruction of Suli, Veli was made Pasha of the Morea, and this promotion may have caused friction between him and his brother Muhtar. Correspondence between Ali and Veli at this time indicates that they were not always on good terms, with Veli being more of a diplomat who sought common ground rather than conflict. By 1804, Veli was the sanjakbey of Delvina and honoured with the title of Beylerbey of Rumelia.

In 1806, following renewed conflict between the Ottomans and the Russians, Ali Pasha ordered Veli to attack the Septinsular Republic. Under the pretext of defending the region from Russian aggression, Veli drove out the governor of Preveza, seizing the city and the nearby towns of Vonitsa, Igoumenitsa and Butrint. Ali demanded that the Russians give up the Souliotes who had taken refuge on the Ionian Islands along with the klephts from the Morea who had fled Veli's attacks, such as Theodoros Kolokotronis. When these demands were refused, Ali prepared to attack Santa Maura, the location of exile for many of the Greek captains and their men, and he was aided by the French due to his good relations with Napoleon Bonaparte.

After Sultan Selim III was assassinated in 1808, a period of chaos ensued across the Ottoman Empire in which Ali occupied Attica by force. Meanwhile, as war on the Danubian front continued against the rebel governor Osman Pazvantoğlu who had begun carving out his own polity centred around Vidin in modern Bulgaria, Ali sent Muhtar and Veli to participate in the Ottoman campaigns in that region. The Klephts began revolting in 1809, and Theodoros Kolokotronis allied with an Albanian chief by the name of Ali Farmaki who had quarrelled with Veli. Kolokotronis wished to form a confederacy of Souliotes and other Albanian tribes under Hasan Çapari to overthrow Ali Pasha and his sons, and sought the aid of the French. Kolokotronis soon turned on the French and joined the ranks of the British instead.

By 1807, Veli Pasha had 10,000 soldiers at his disposal. Veli and his brother Muhtar attempted to convince their father to come to terms with the Sublime Porte but to no avail. Nonetheless, Ali Pasha would entrust Preveza to Veli, and Parga to Veli's eldest son Mehmet. In 1812, upon the appearance of Ottoman troops - who had arrived to subdue Ali Pasha - the Muslim population of Preveza threatened to revolt and forced Veli into the citadel. Preveza was blockaded by Turkish and Souliote forces, and the Ottoman government attempted to negotiate his surrender. In order to save his captured son Mehmet (at the pleas of Veli's other son Selim), and in return for an appointment to the Pashalik of St. John of Acre, Veli finally surrendered Preveza and deserted his father's cause.

After Veli's father Ali was killed and beheaded, the head was sent to Istanbul, where it was displayed to the public on a revolving platter in a courtyard of the Sultan's palace. When the Sultan subsequently had Ali's three sons - including Veli - and Ali's grandson executed, Ali's head was buried with them in the tombs outside the Selymbria gate in Istanbul.

== Legacy ==
Apart from his appointment as Pasha in multiple regions, Veli Pasha was also known for plundering multiple ancient sites. He plundered the Treasury of Atreus in Mycenae. In April, 1808, he had people dig in Mycenae; he unearthed the Tomb of Clytemnestra among multiple other tombs containing human remains and jewellery, valuable stones and gems. He also unearthed around 25 statues and a marble table. He had them all transported to Tripolitza where he is said to have thrown out the mortal remains and the gems. He sold all other findings to western travellers for 80,000.

== Sources ==
- Fleming, Katherine Elizabeth (1999). The Muslim Bonaparte: Diplomacy and Orientalism in Ali Pasha's Greece. Princeton University Press. ISBN 0-691-00194-4.
- Papageorgiou, Stefanos P. (2014). "The attitude of the Beys of the Albanian Southern Provinces (Toskaria) towards Ali Pasha Tepedelenli and the Sublime Porte (mid-18th-mid-19th centuries)". Cahiers balkaniques. 42. doi:10.4000/ceb.3520.
- Russell, Quentin; Russell, Eugenia (30 September 2017). Ali Pasha, Lion of Ioannina: The Remarkable Life of the Balkan Napoleon. Pen and Sword. ISBN 978-1-4738-7722-1.
