= Konstantin Kapıdağlı =

Greek–Ottoman court painter

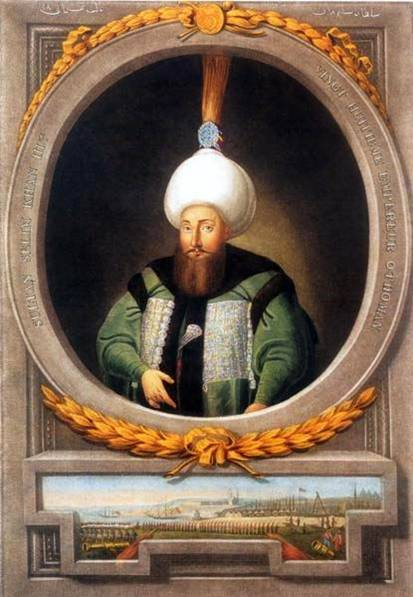
Selim III from the Kapıdağlı series

Konstantin Kapıdağlı (born Konstantinos Kyzikinos; Greek: Κωνσταντῖνος Κυζικηνός) was an Ottoman Greek court painter from the late 18th century to the early 19th century. Most of his works were created around 1789–1806.

Kapıdağlı's set of Ottoman sultan portraits are known as the Kapıdağlı series (1804–1806). Most of the sultans were deceased at the time of creation, and hence the faces are idealistic and imaginative. Unlike previous sultan portraits, this series housed the sultans in a frame, with additional imagery below depicting a scene from the sultan's life. This style set an example after which other 19th-century sultan portraits followed. The series is kept at the Topkapı Palace in Istanbul.

Kapıdağlı was commissioned by Sultan Selim III to draw engravings of Ottoman sultans. However, following Selim III's deposition in 1807, the commission was cancelled. The project resumed with John Young, who published his Series of Portraits of the Emperors of Turkey in 1815 under the reign of Sultan Mahmud II.

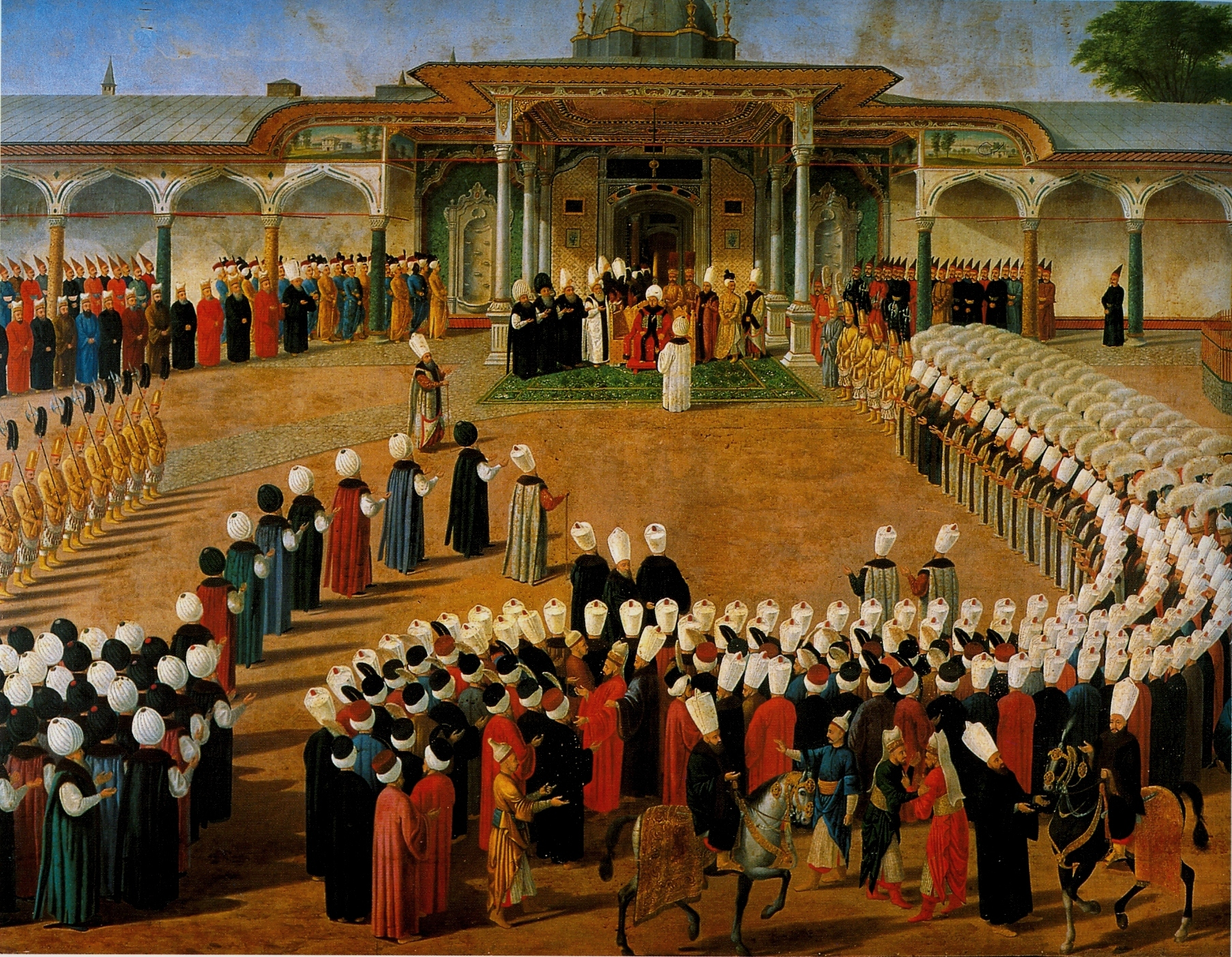
Sultan Selim III Enthroned at a Holiday Ceremony, circa 1789

Kapıdağlı's Sultan Selim III Enthroned at a Holiday Ceremony is one of the first oil on canvas paintings by an Ottoman artist. He also experimented with three-dimensional perspectival construction, which were not common in Ottoman regions at the time (in contrast to European paintings).

The dates and places of his birth and death are unknown.

== Ottoman Sultans Collection ==
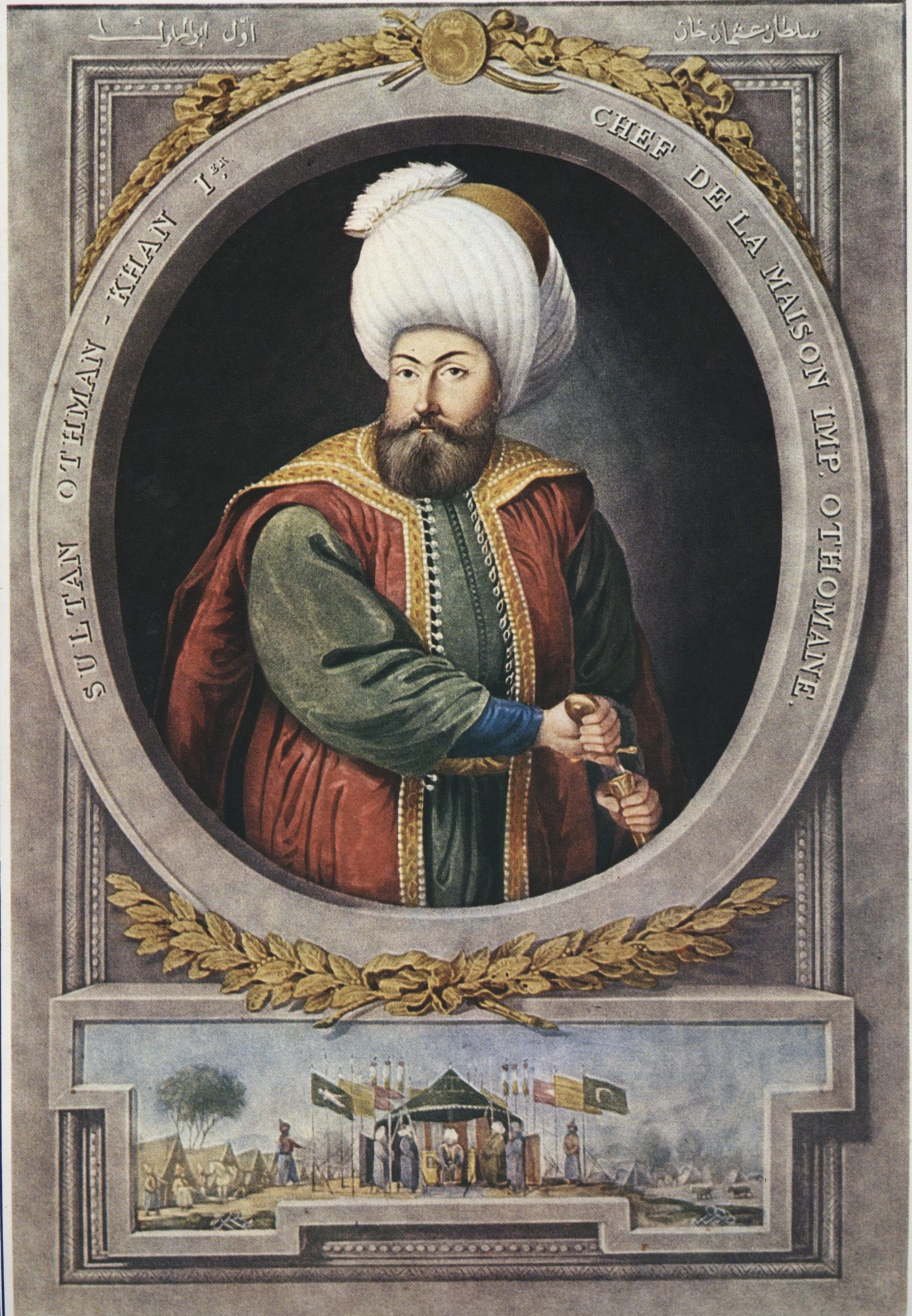
Osman I

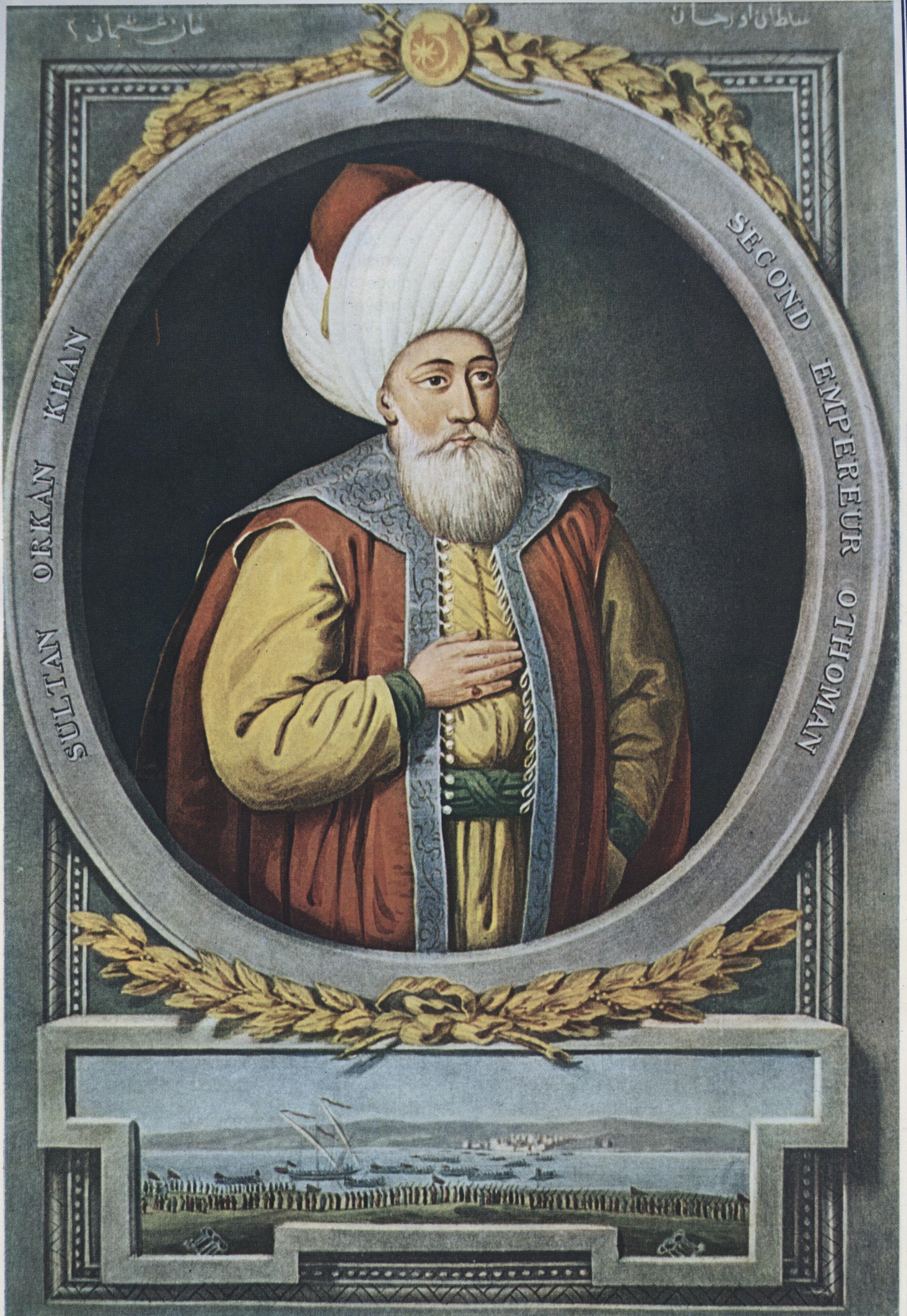
Orhan

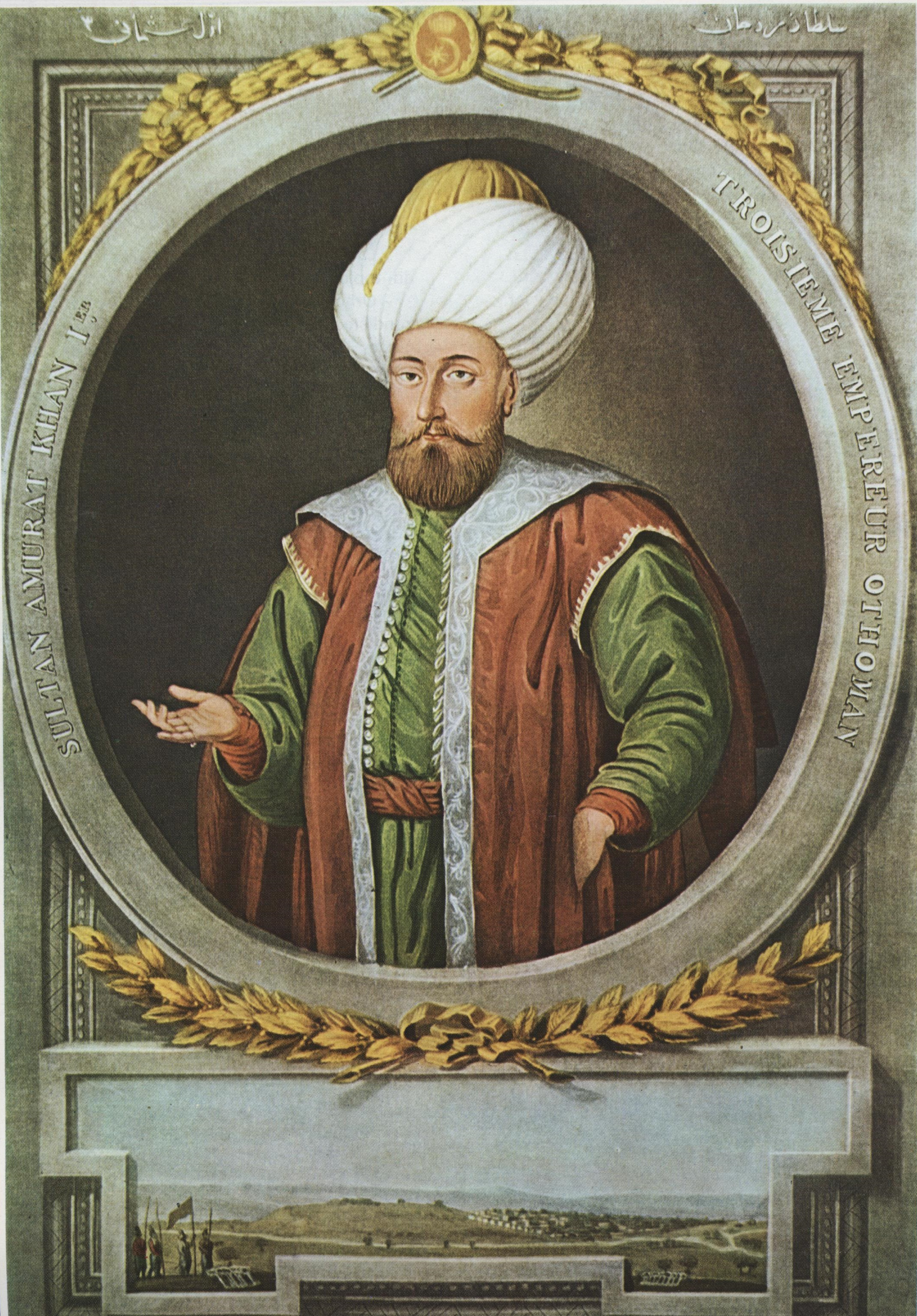
Murad I

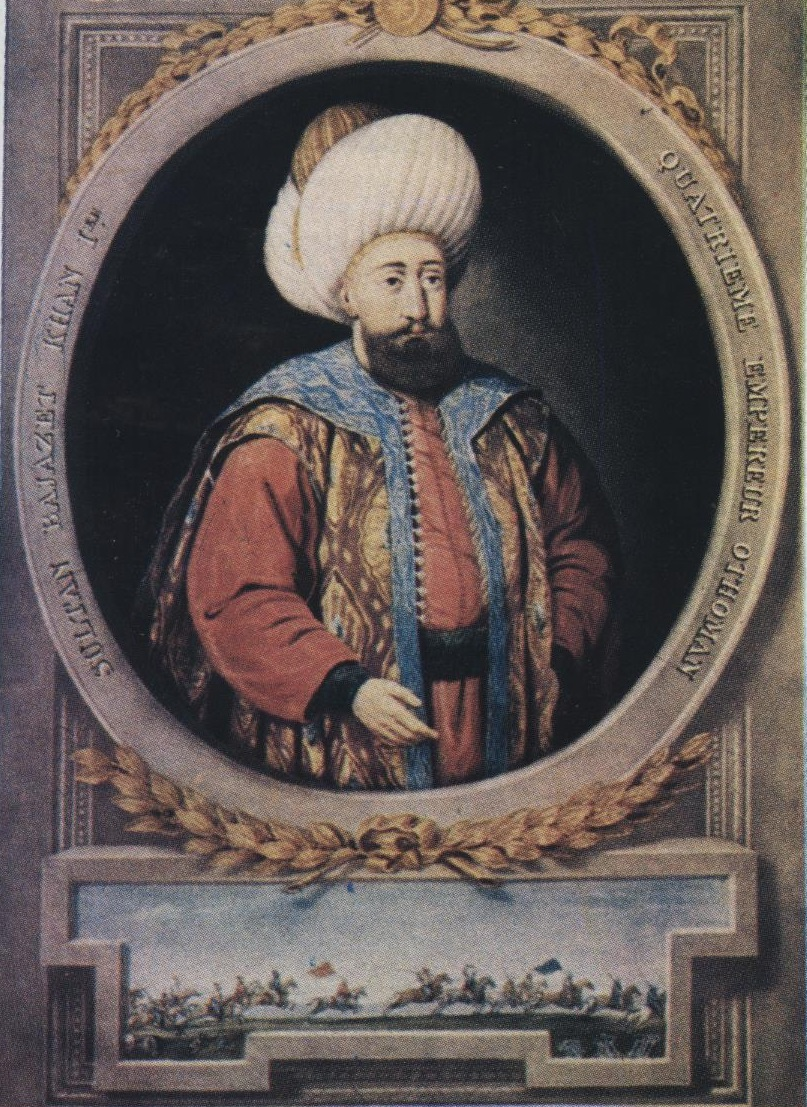
Bayezid I

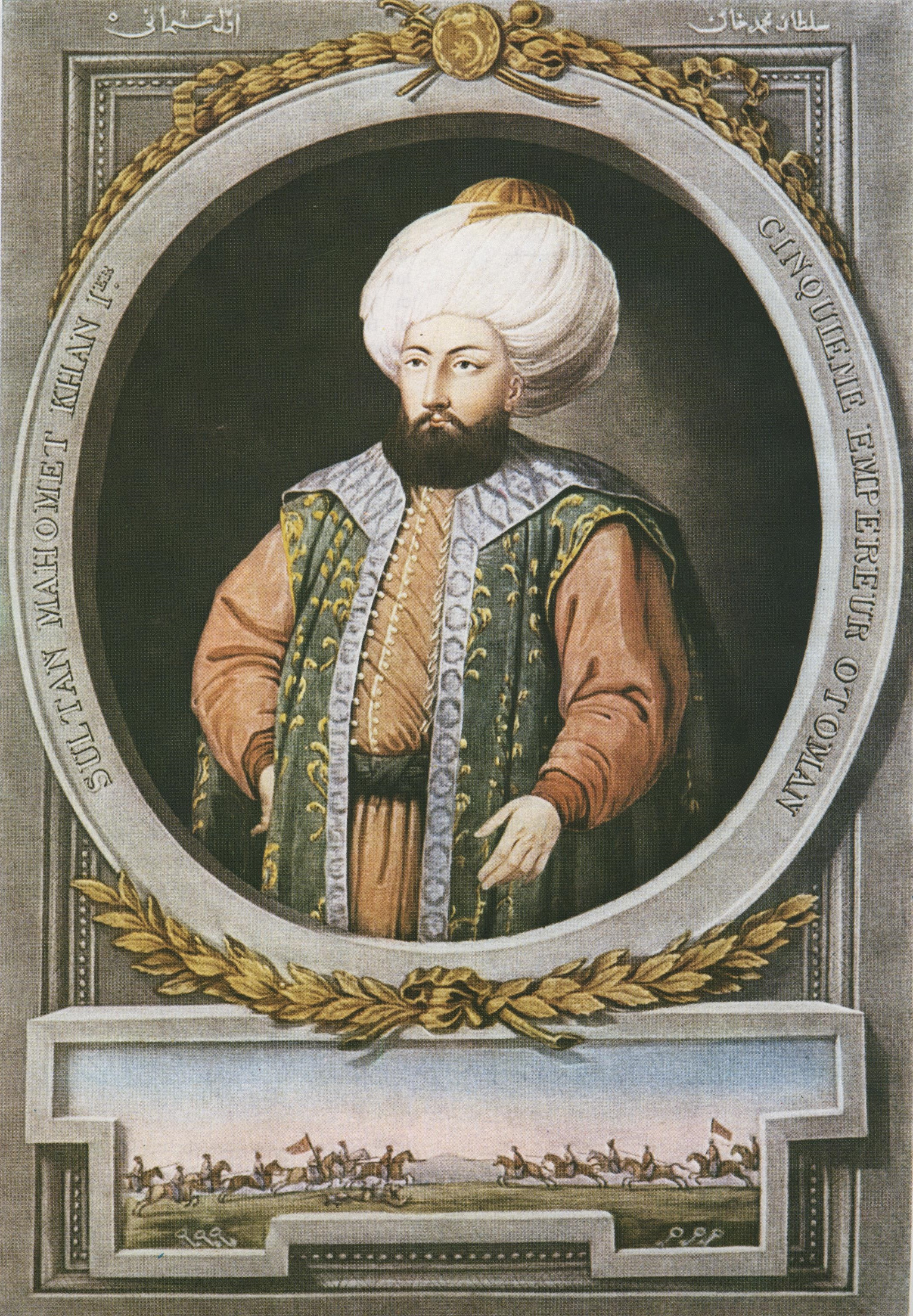
Mehmed I

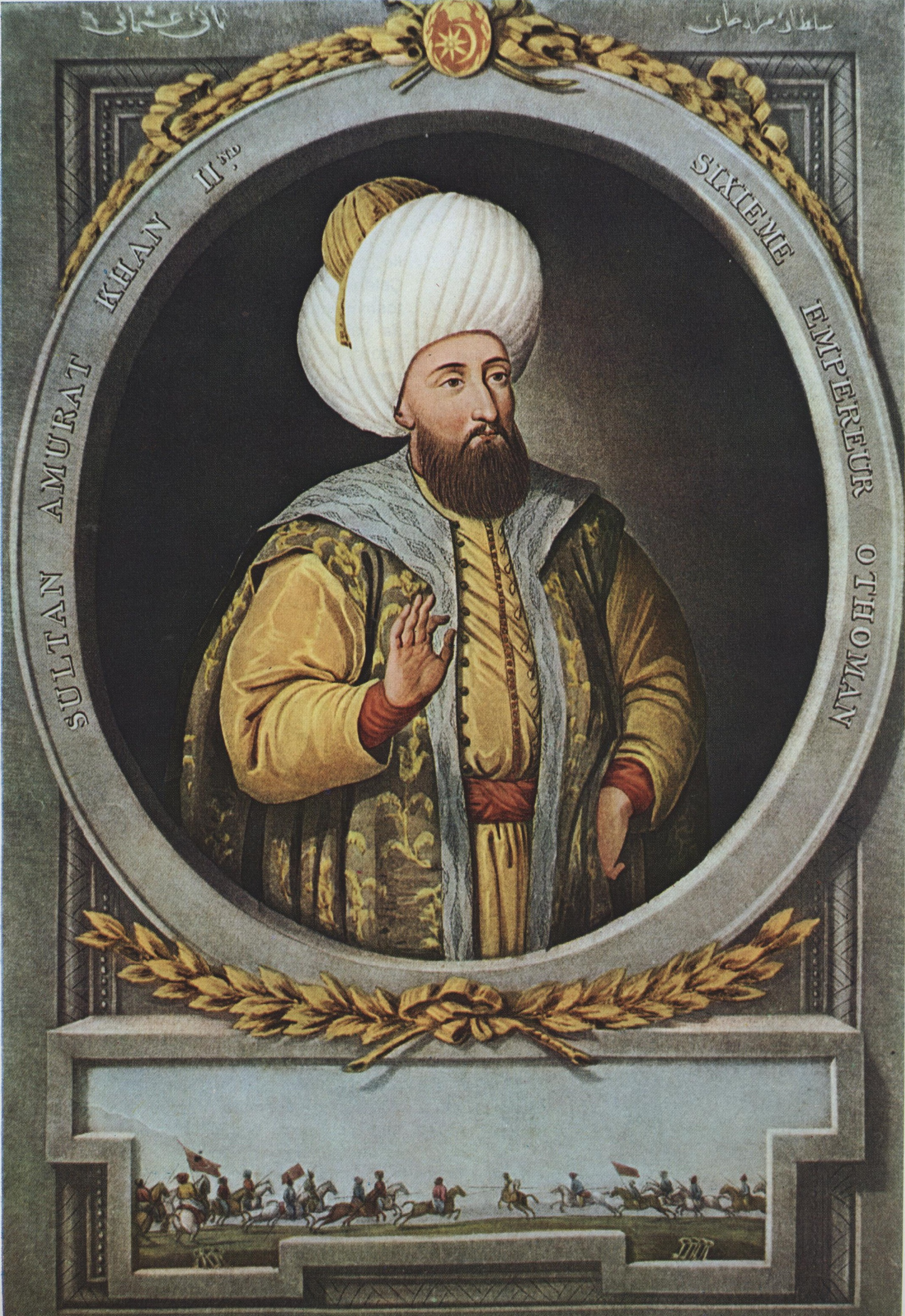
Murad II

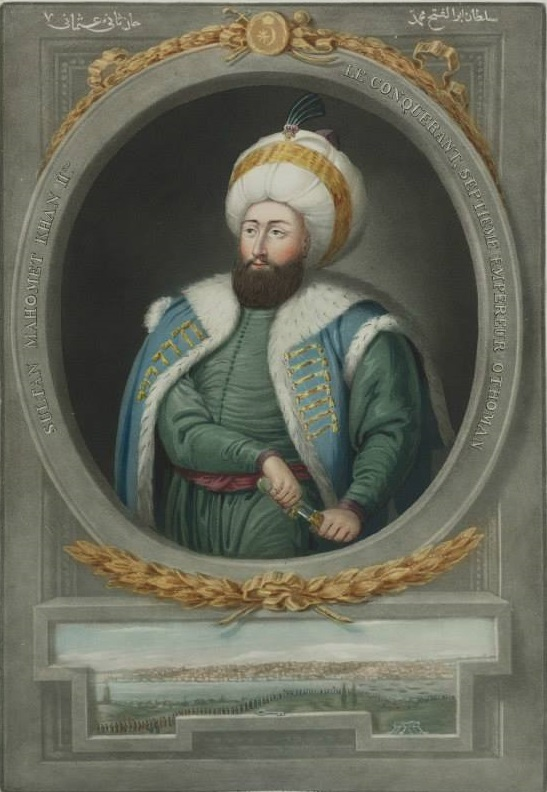
Mehmed II

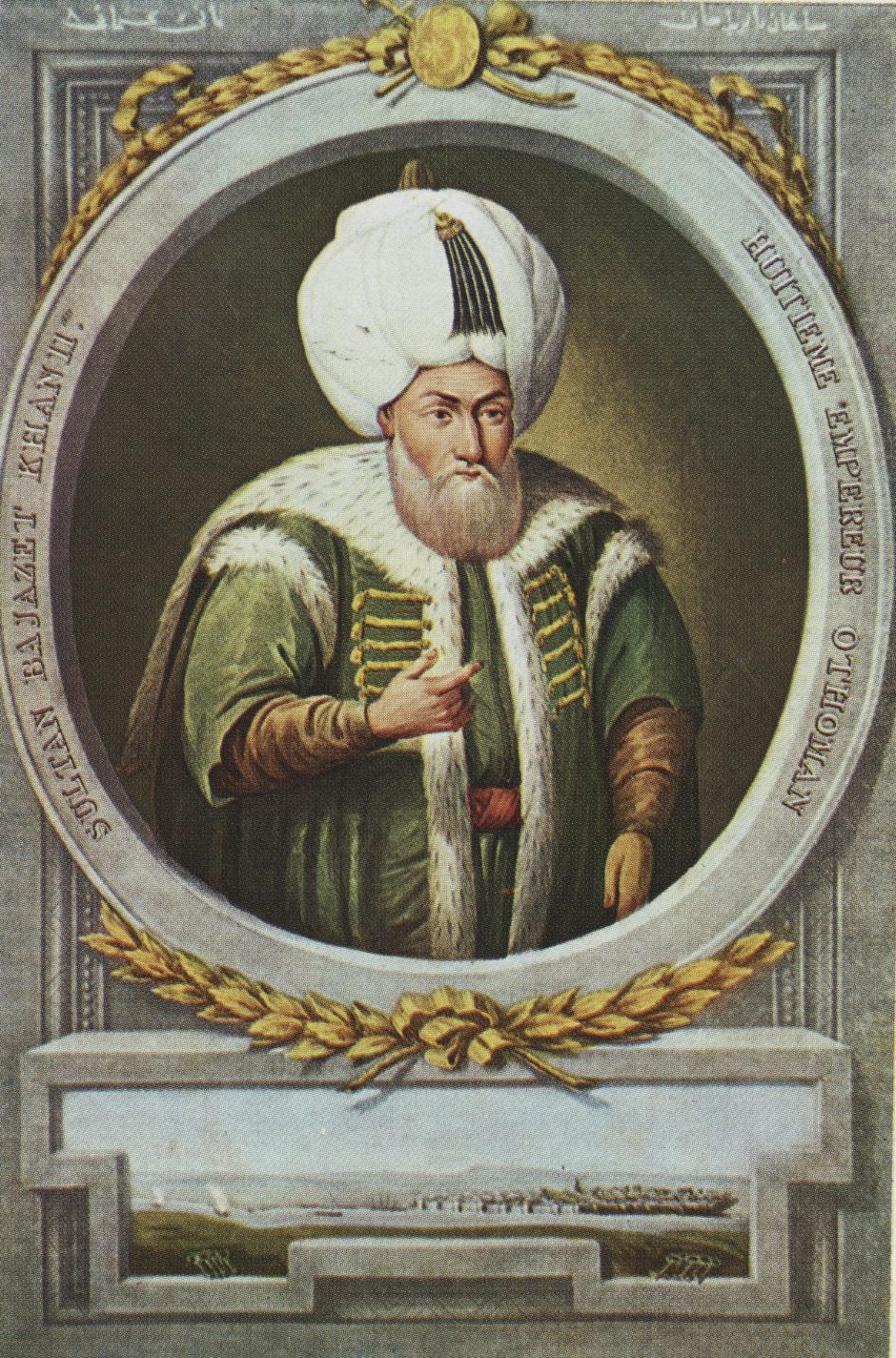
Bayezid II

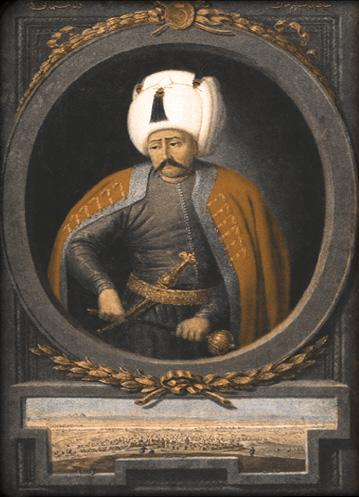
Selim I

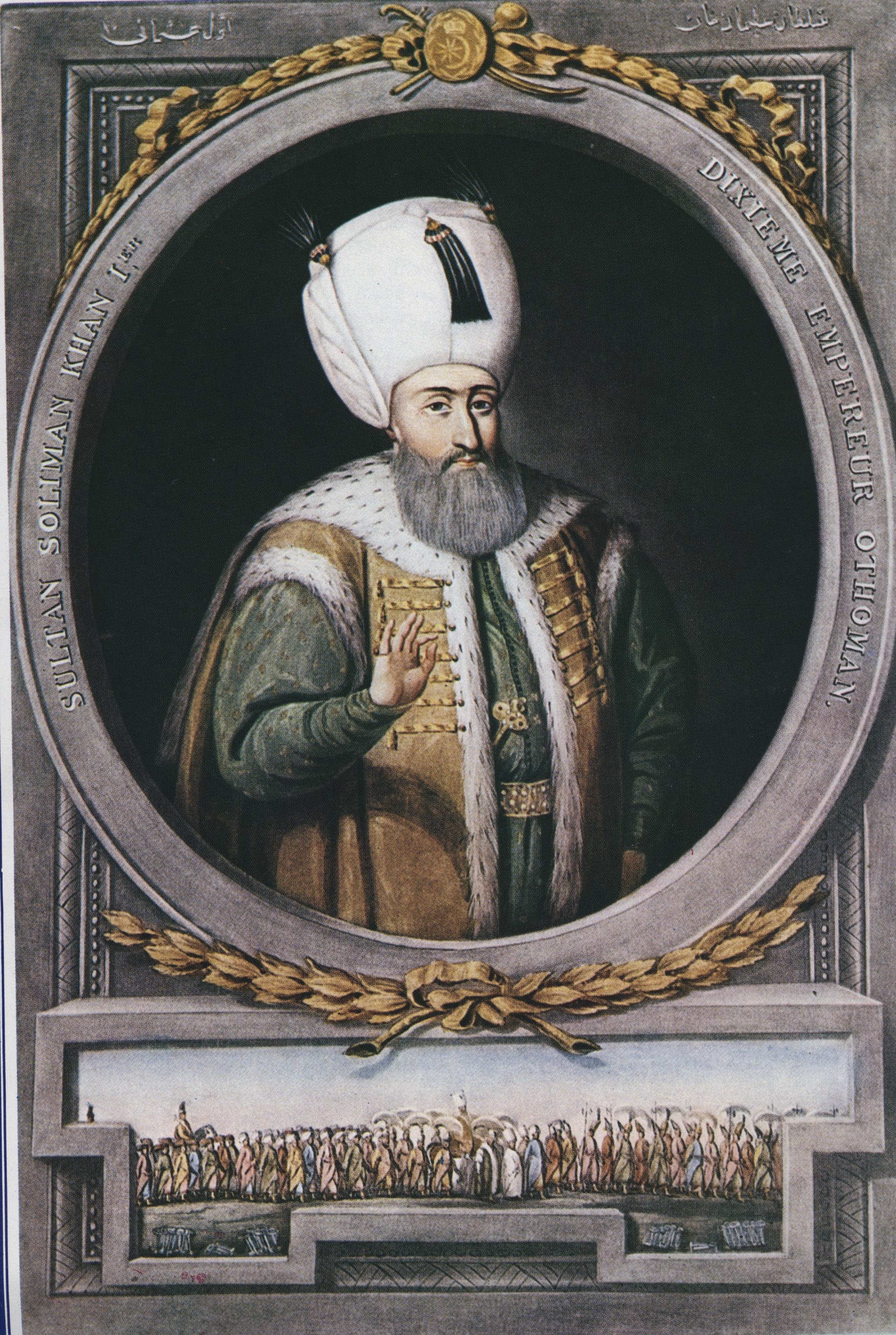
Suleiman I

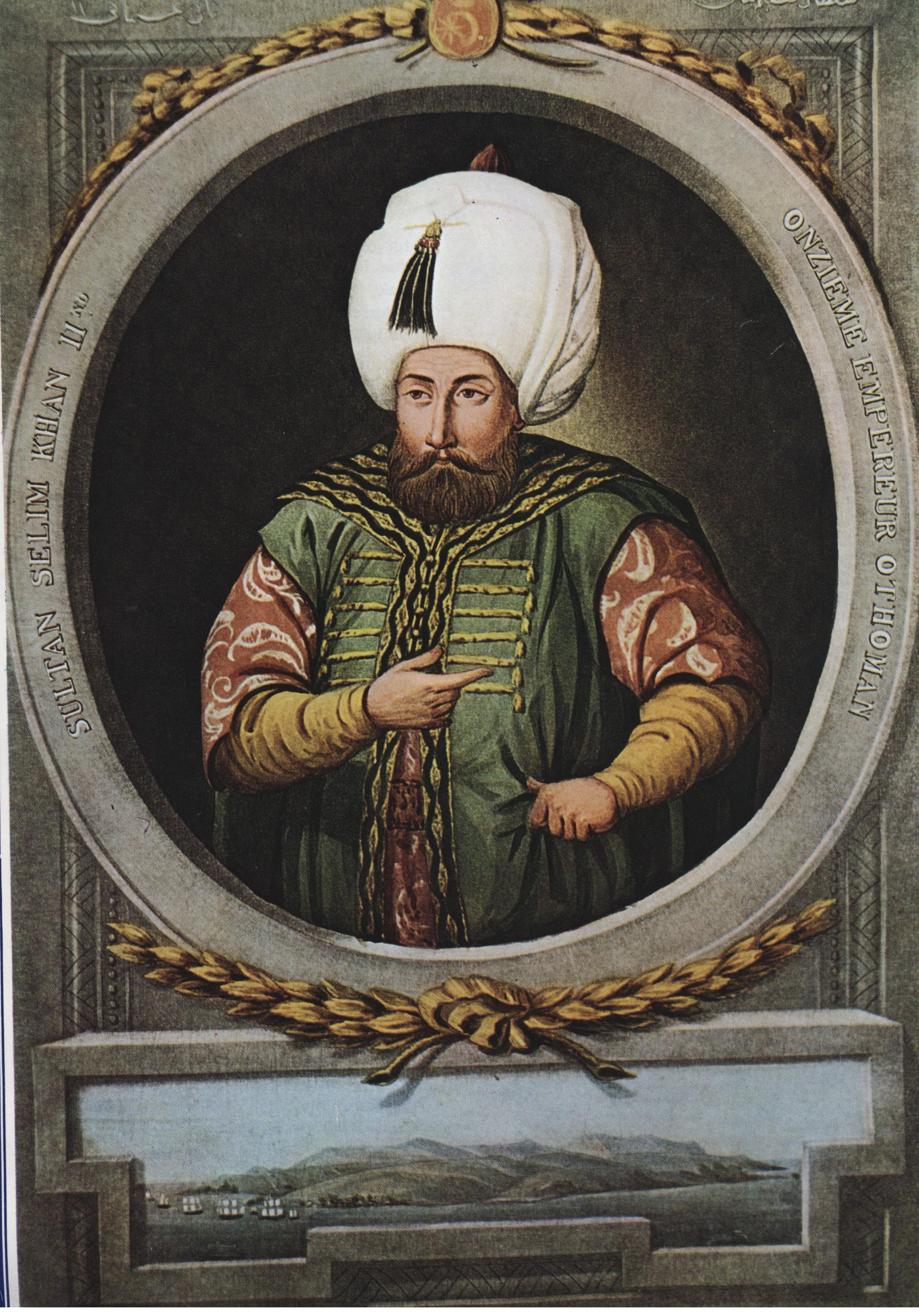
Selim II

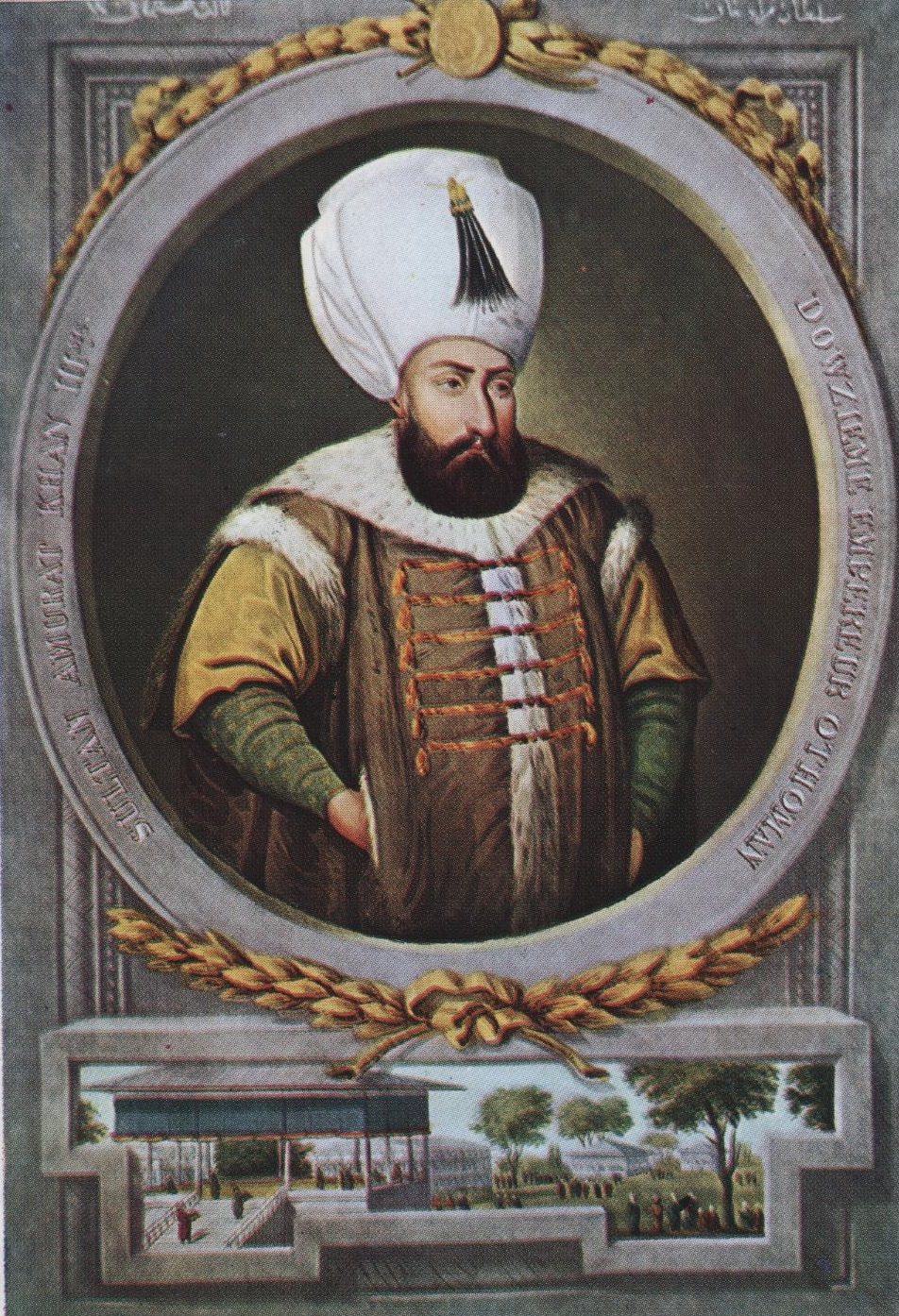
Murad III

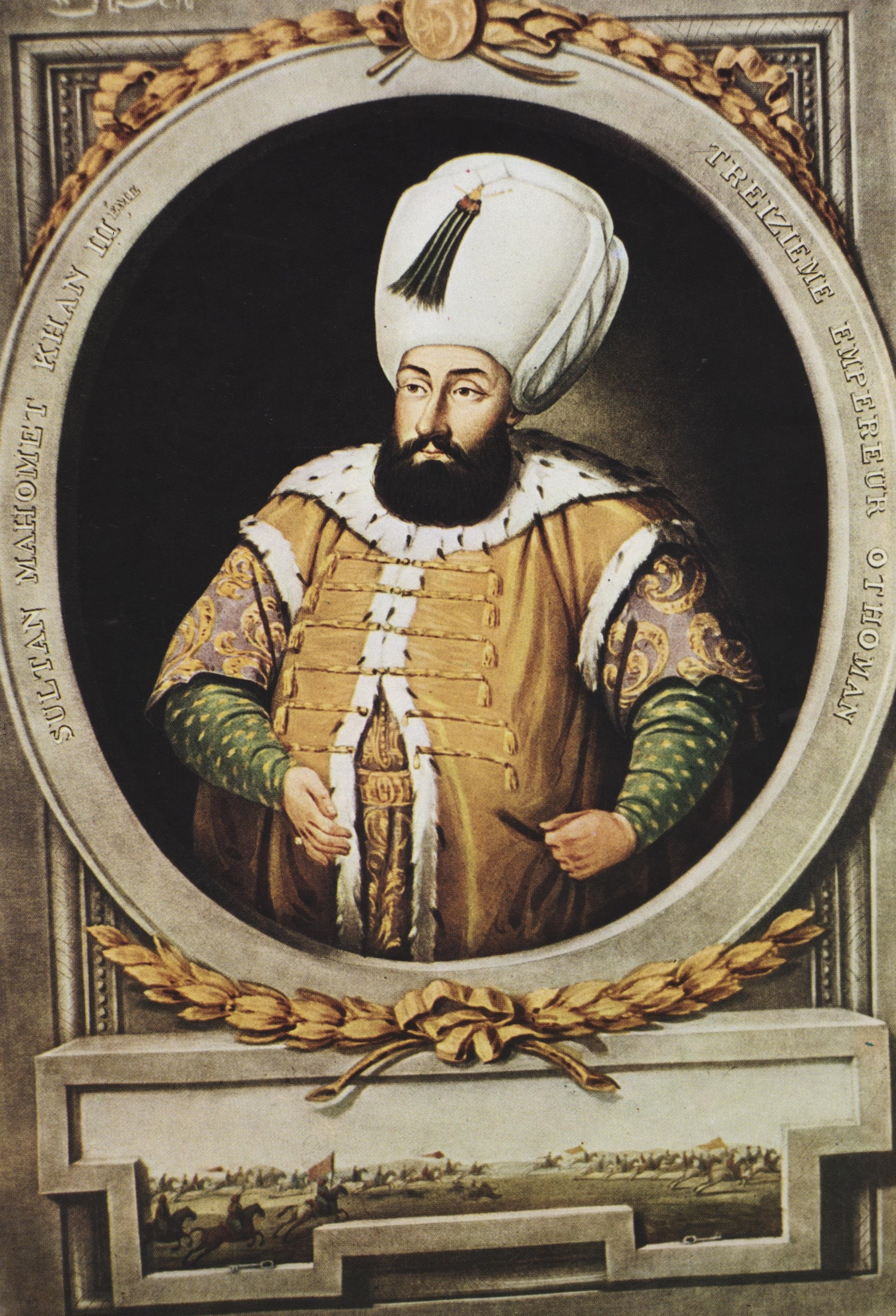
Mehmed III

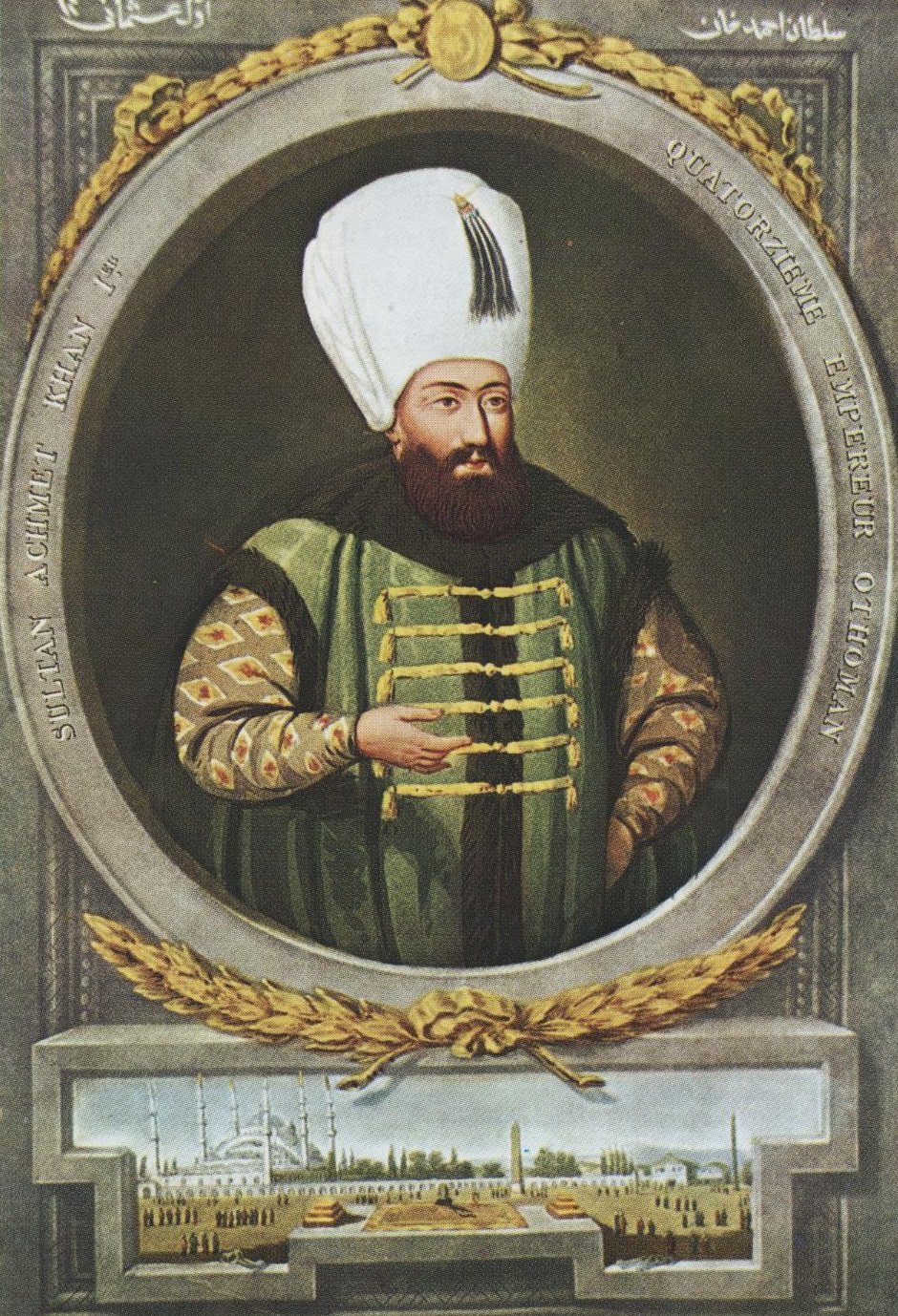
Ahmed I

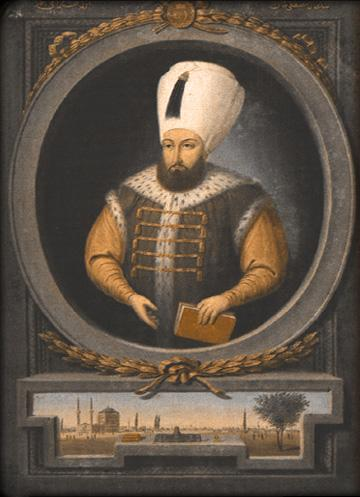
Mustafa I

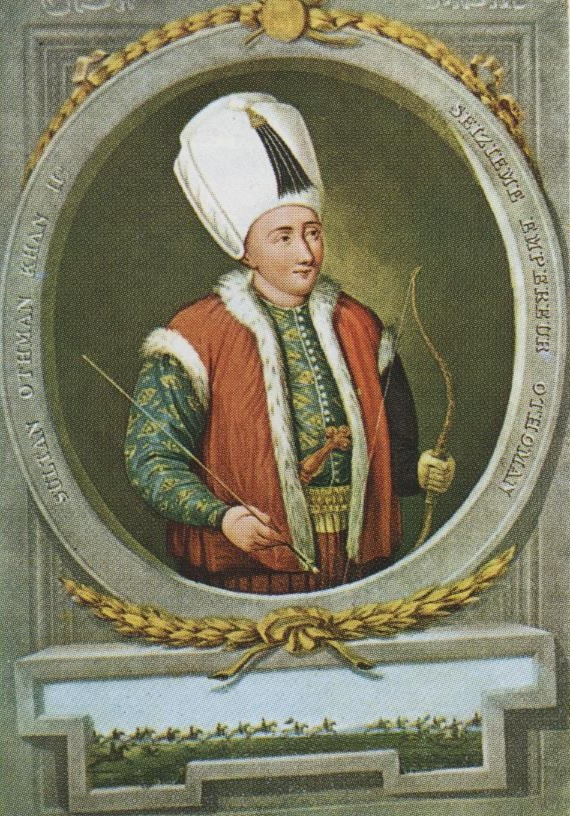
Osman II

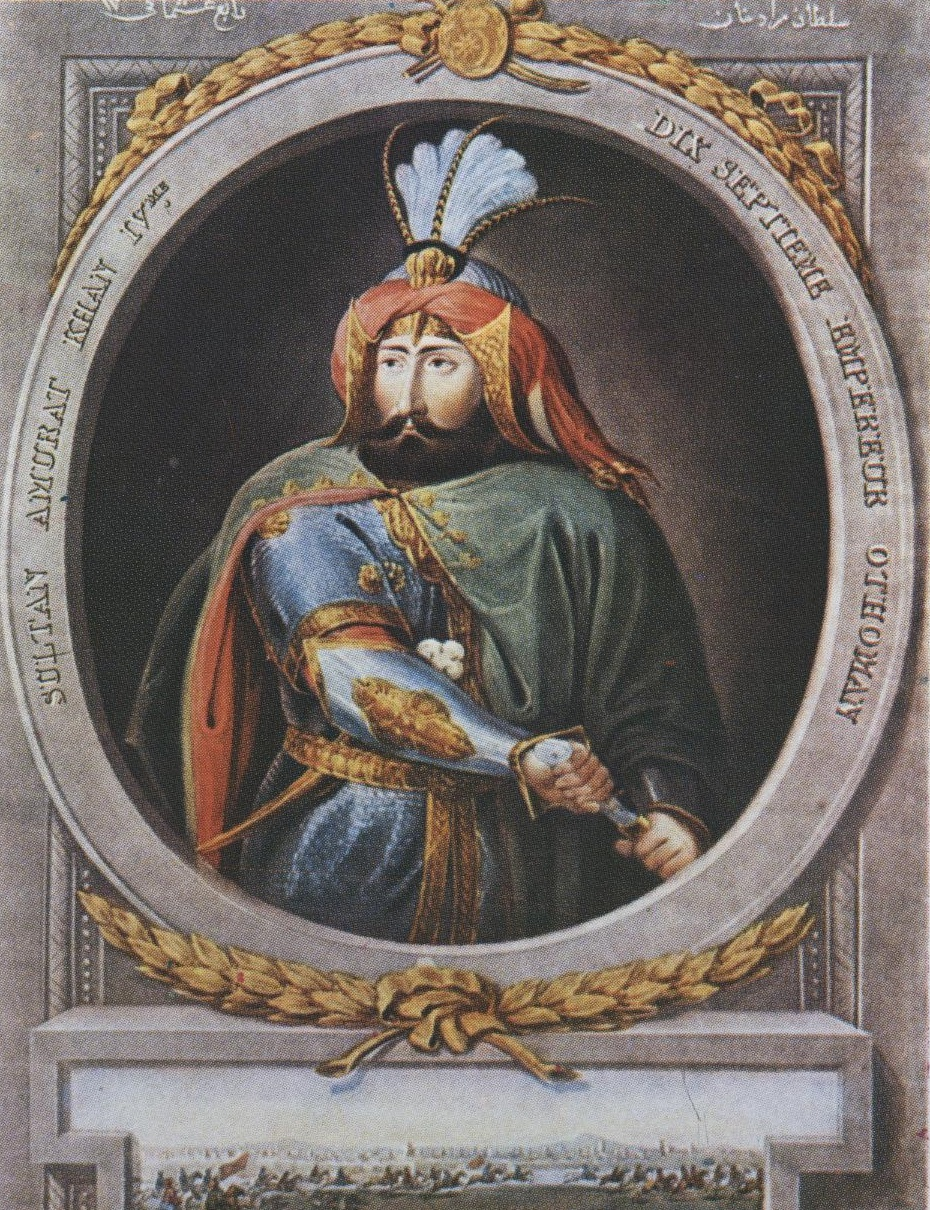
Murad IV

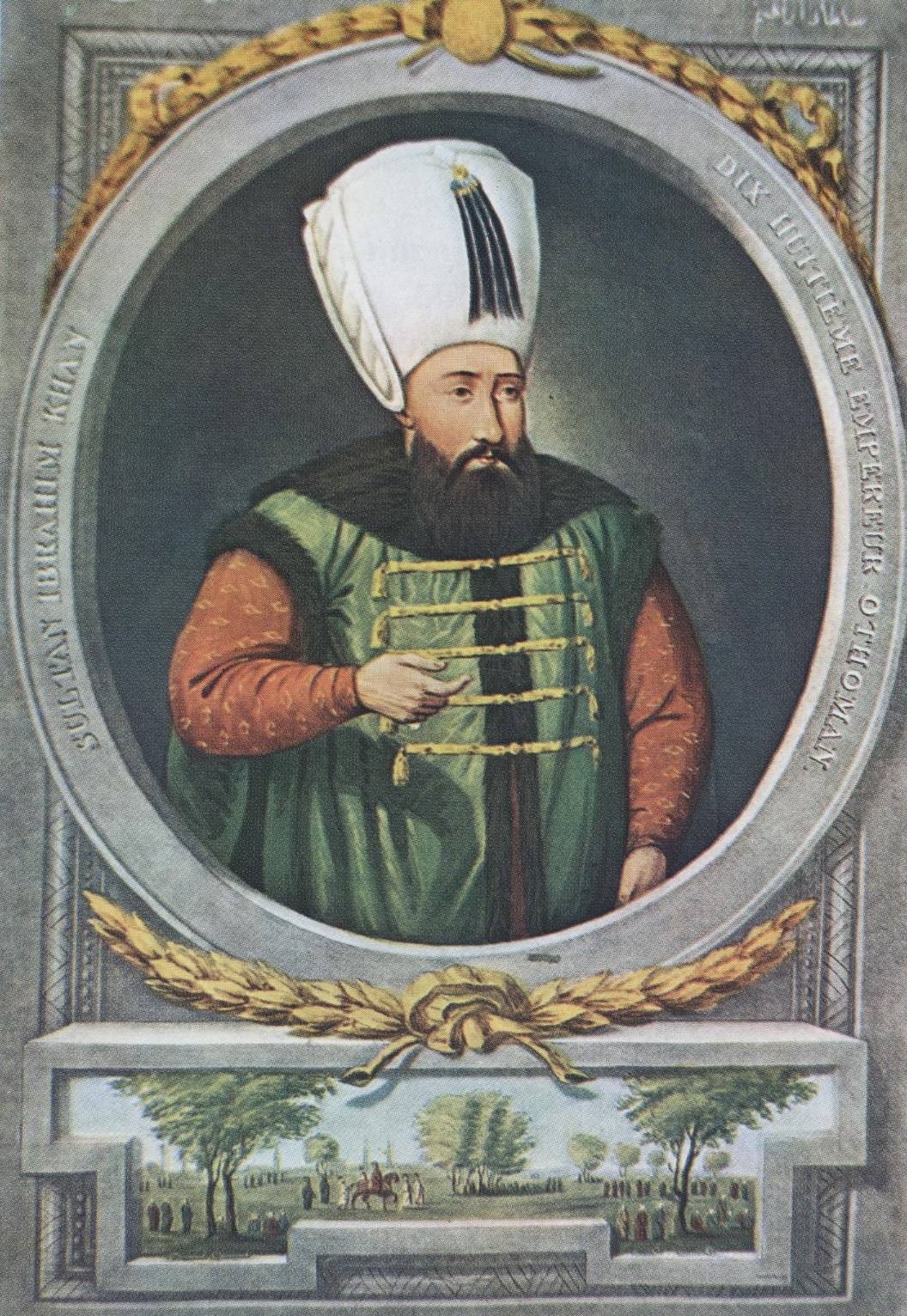
Ibrahim

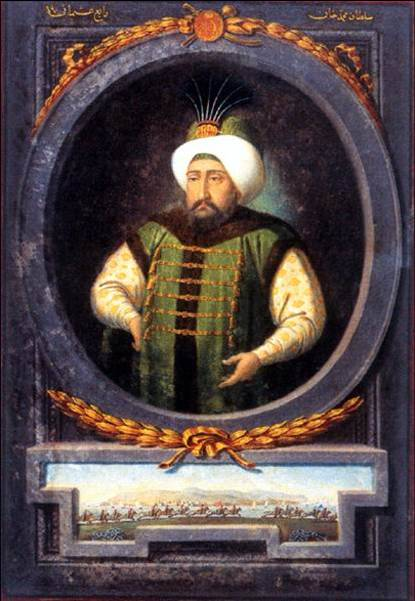
Mehmed IV

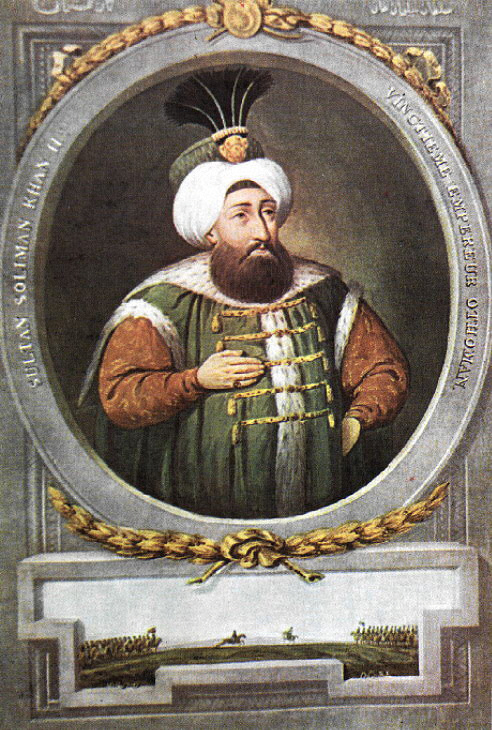
Suleiman II

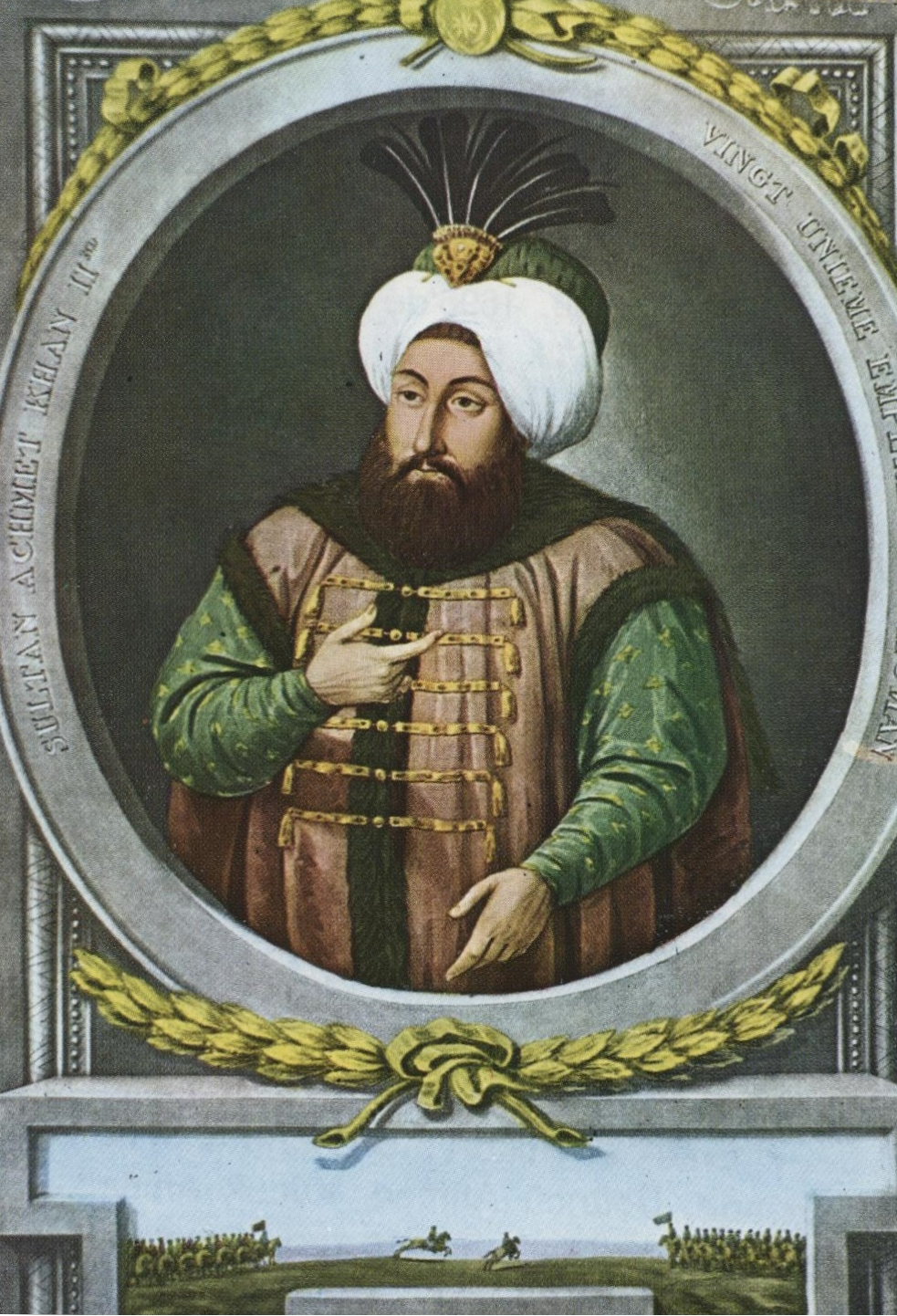
Ahmed II

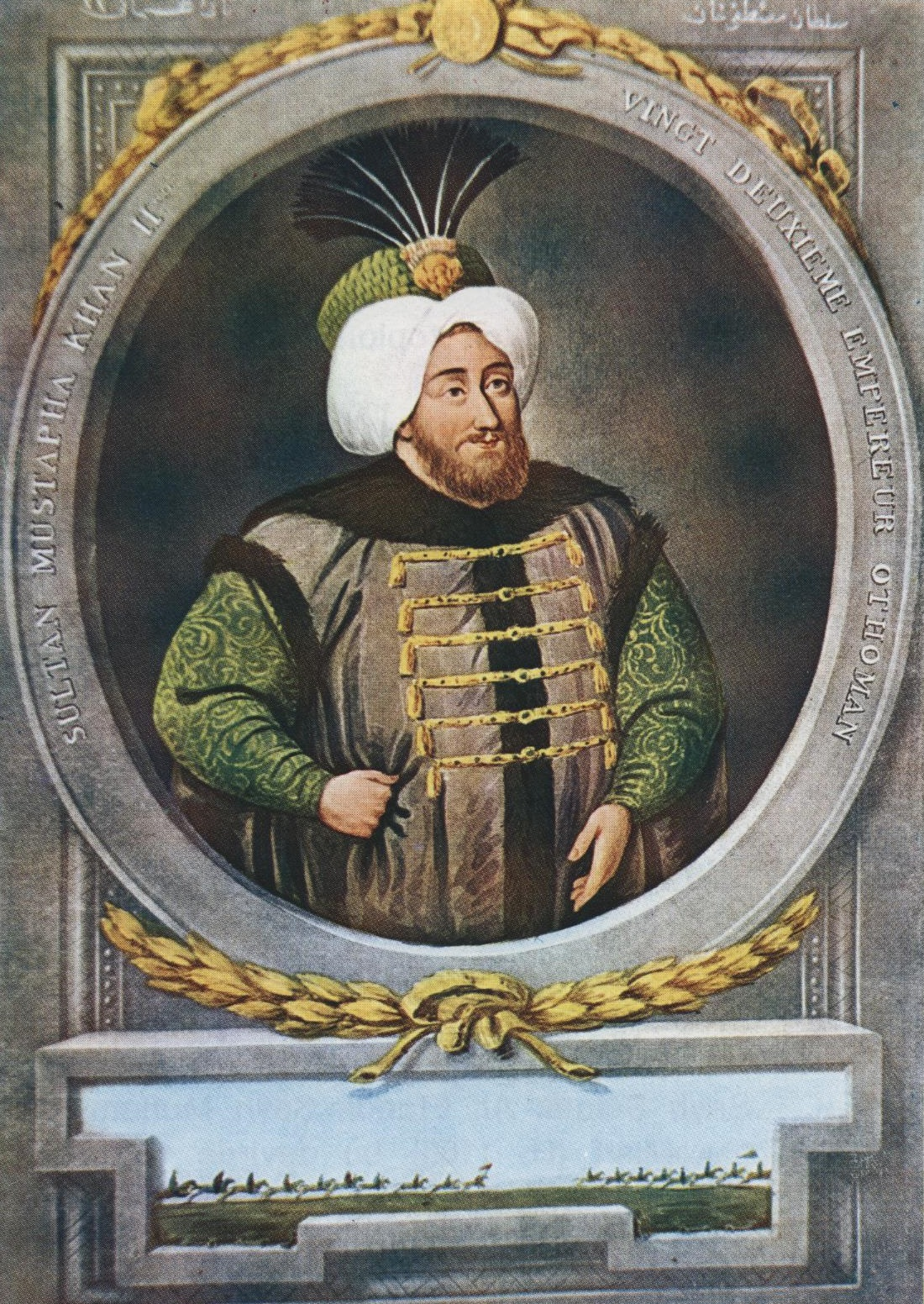
Mustafa II

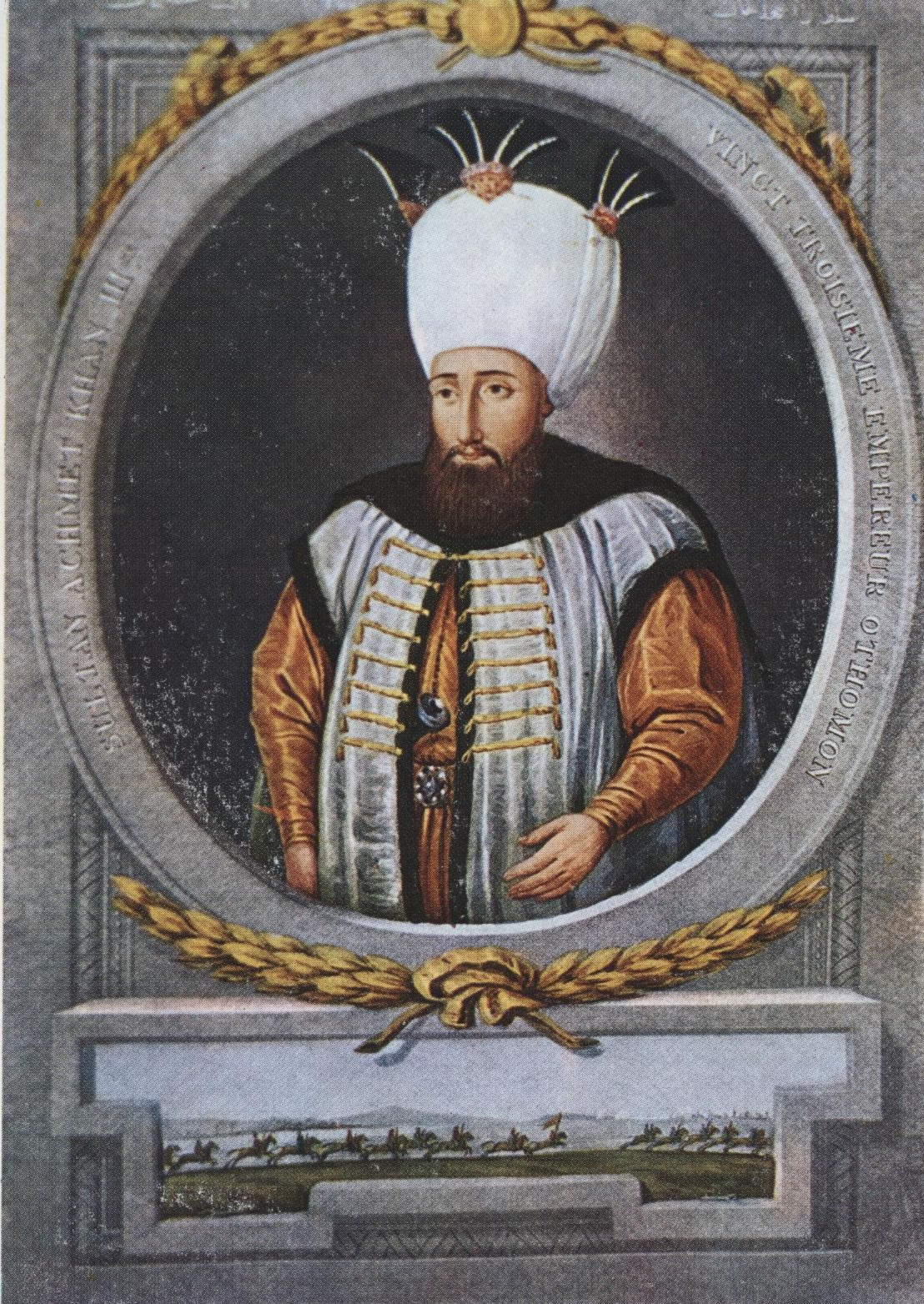
Ahmed III

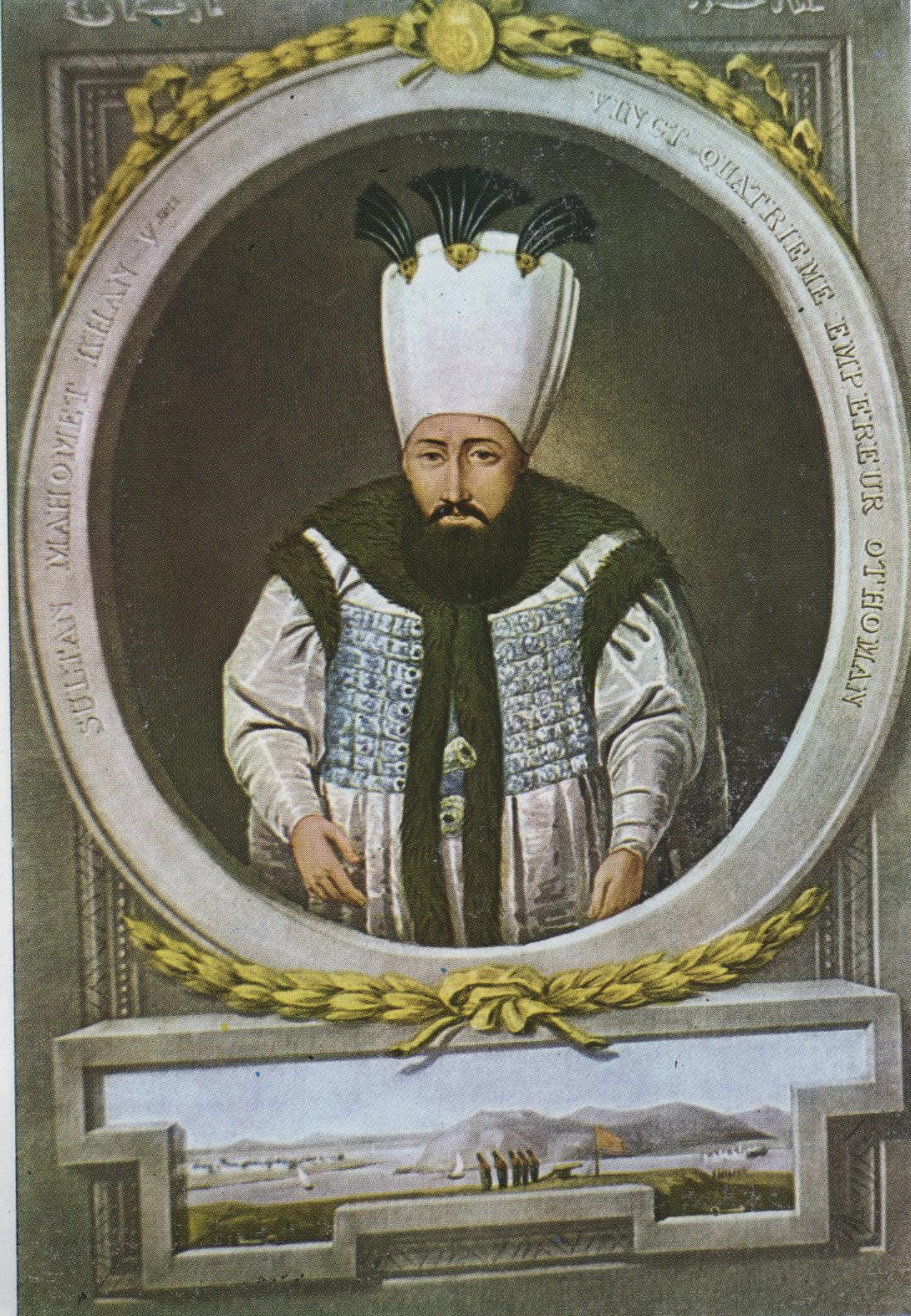
Mahmud I

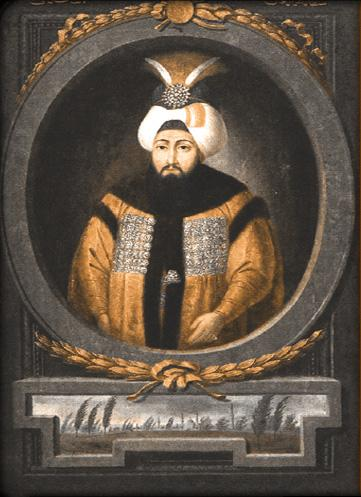
Osman III

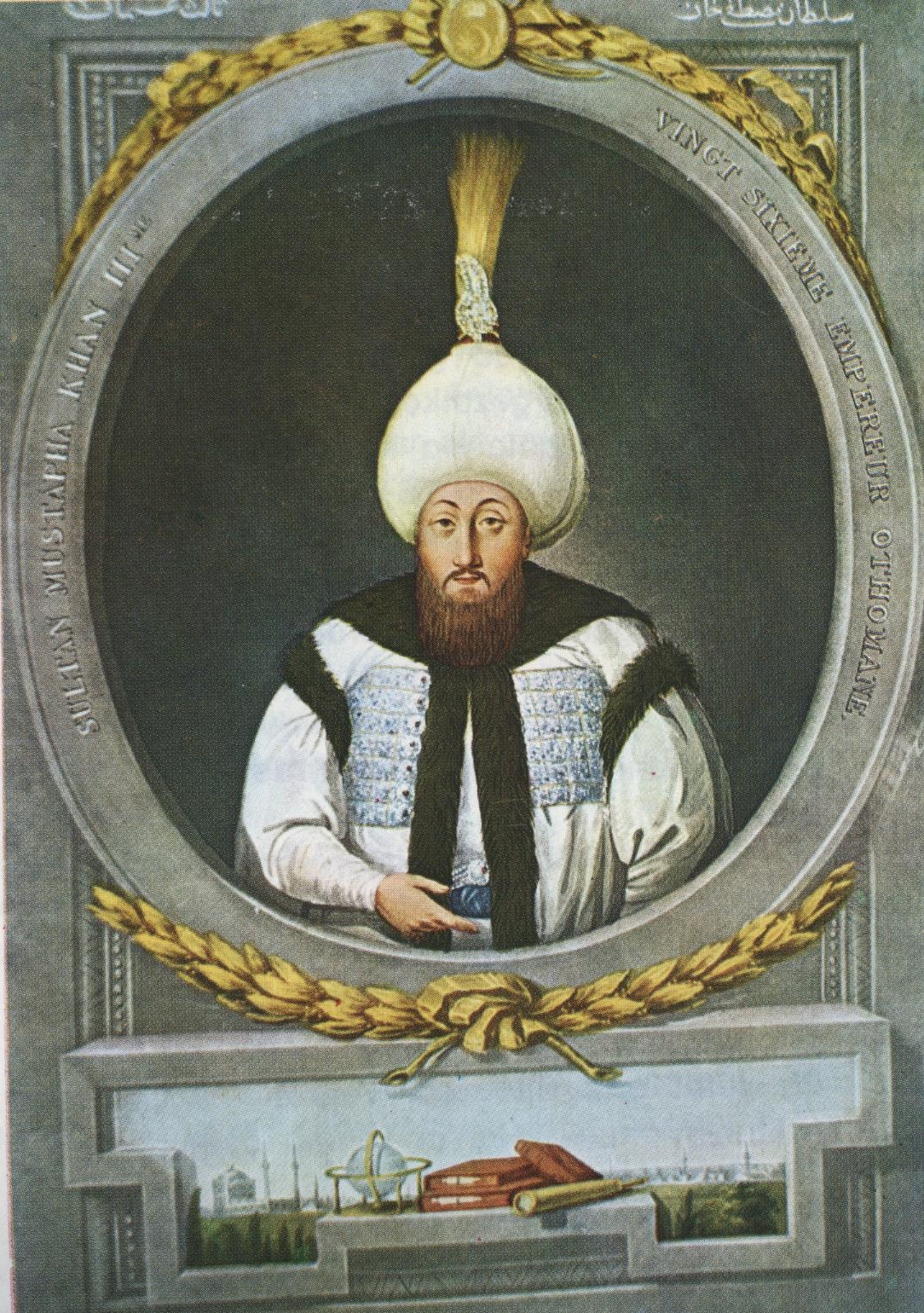
Mustafa III

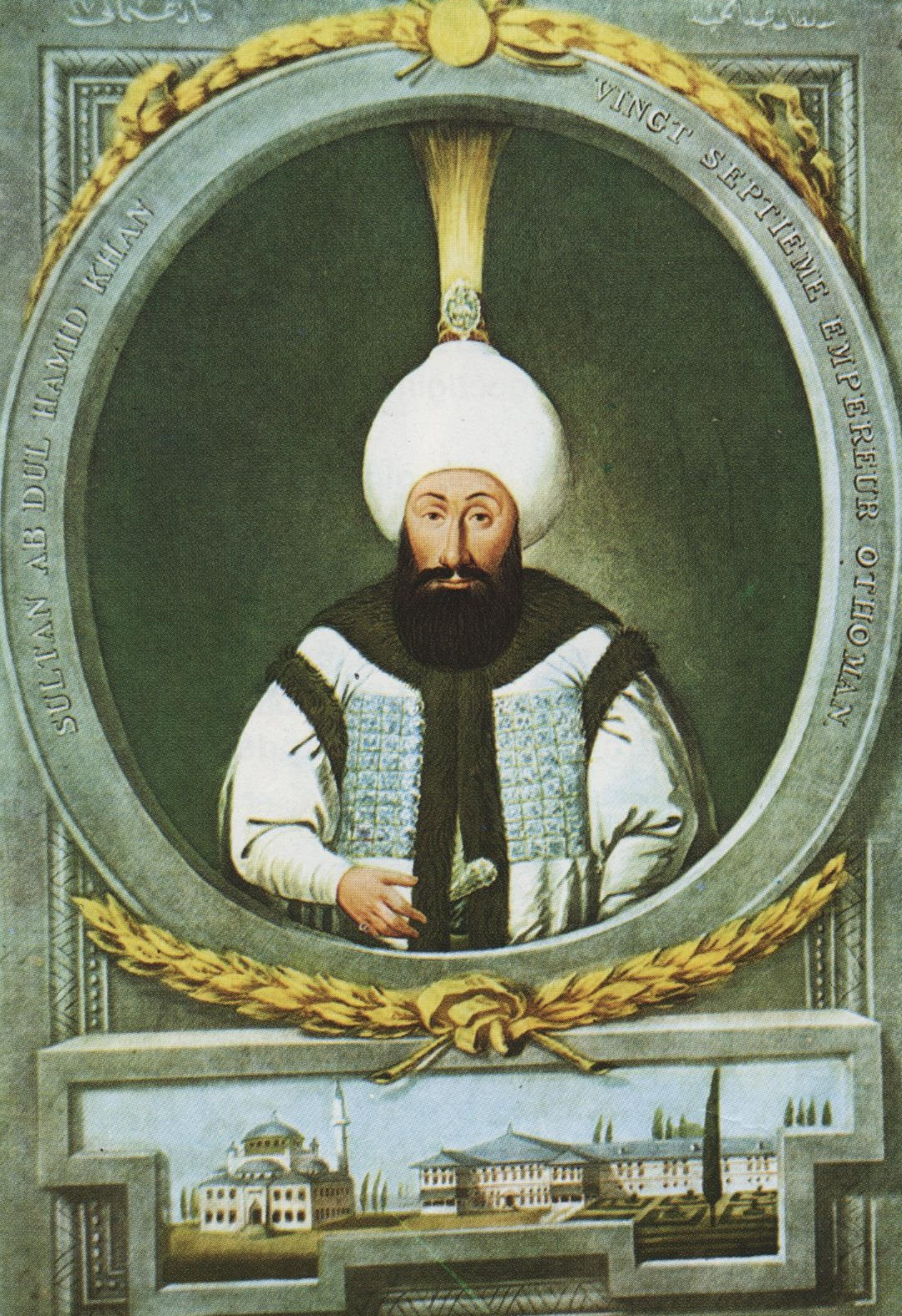
Abdul Hamid I

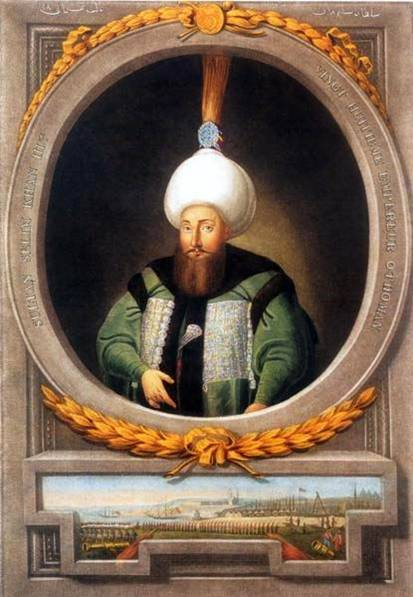
Selim III

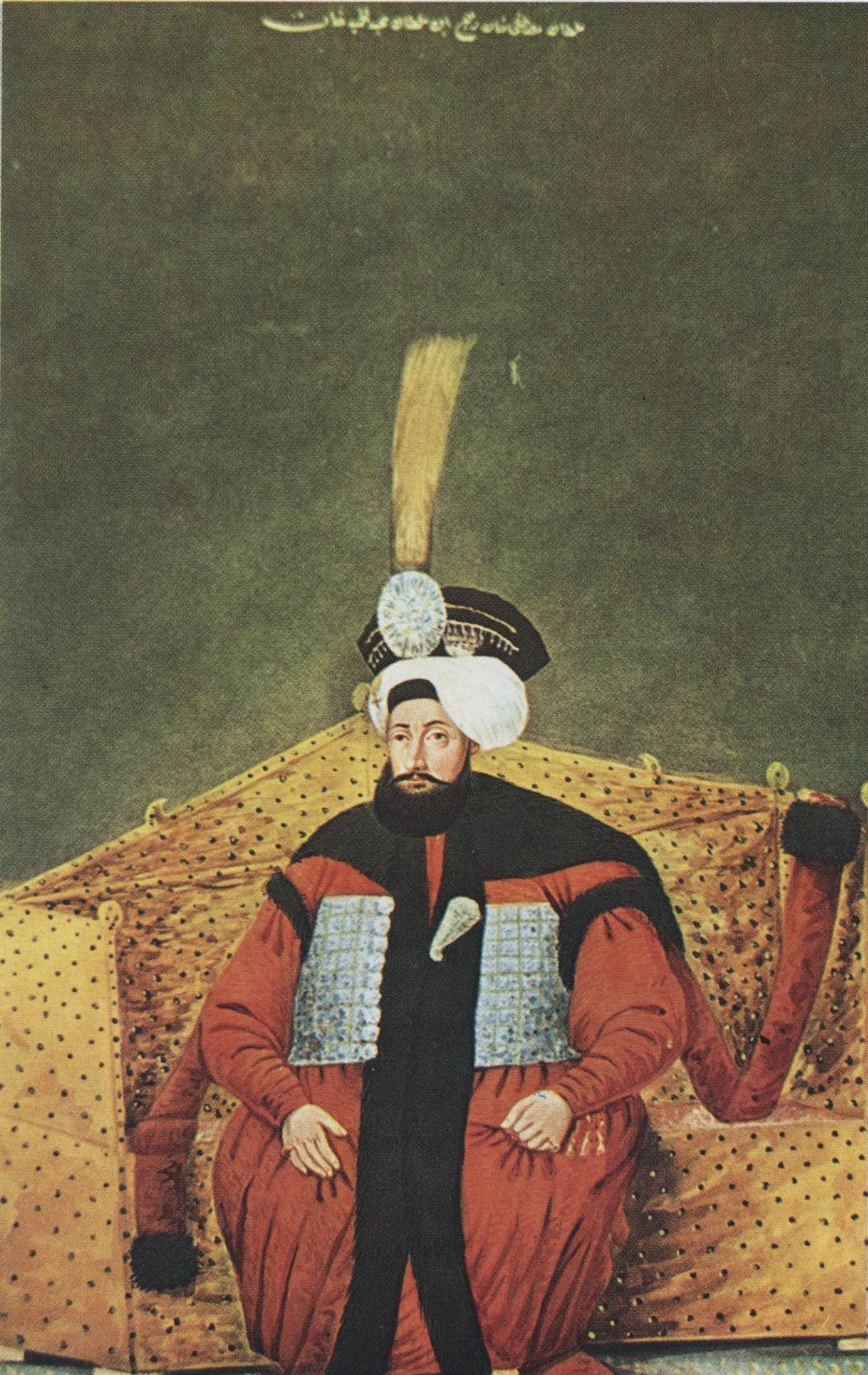
Mustafa IV
