= Selim III =

Sultan of the Ottoman Empire from 1789 to 1807

- Custodian of the Two Holy Mosques; Sultan of the two lands, Khagan of the two seas
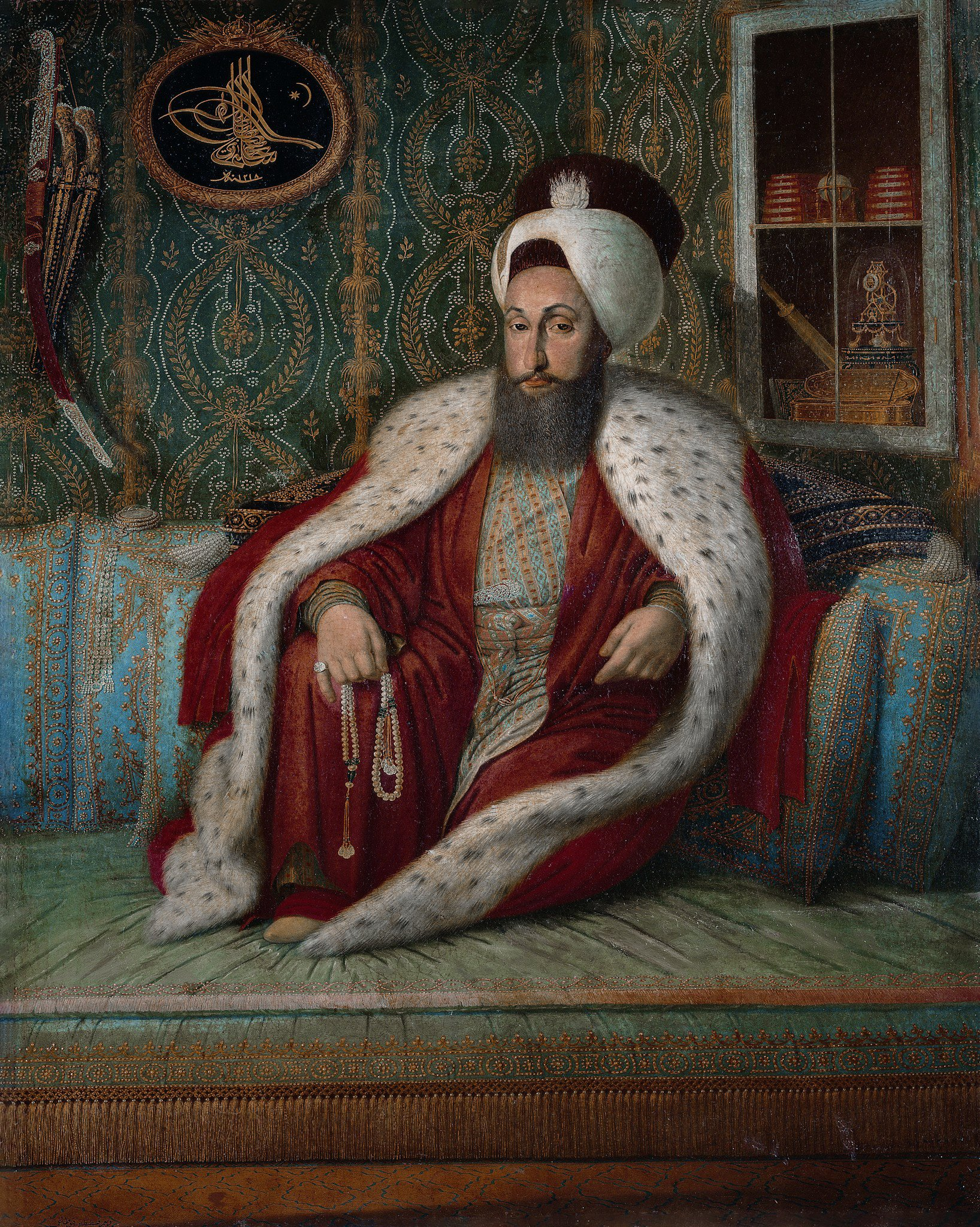
- Portrait by Konstantin Kapıdağlı, 1803

Sultan of the Ottoman Empire (Padishah)
- Reign: 7 April 1789 – 29 May 1807
- Predecessor: Abdul Hamid I
- Successor: Mustafa IV

Ottoman Caliph (Amir al-Mu'minin)
- Predecessor: Abdul Hamid I
- Successor: Mustafa IV
- Born: 24 December 1761; Topkapı Palace, Constantinople, Ottoman Empire
- Died: 28 July 1808 (aged 46); Topkapı Palace, Constantinople, Ottoman Empire
- Cause of death: Assassination
- Burial: Laleli Mosque, Istanbul
- Consorts: Nefizar Kadın; Afitab Kadın; Zibifer Kadın; Tabisefa Kadın; Refet Kadın; Nüruşems Kadın; Hüsnümah Kadın; Demhoş Kadın; Gongenigar Kadın; Mahbube Kadın; Aynisefa Kadın; Pakize Hanım; Meryem Hanım
Names
- Selim bin Mustafa
- Dynasty: Ottoman
- Father: Mustafa III
- Mother: Mihrişah Sultan
- Religion: Sunni Islam
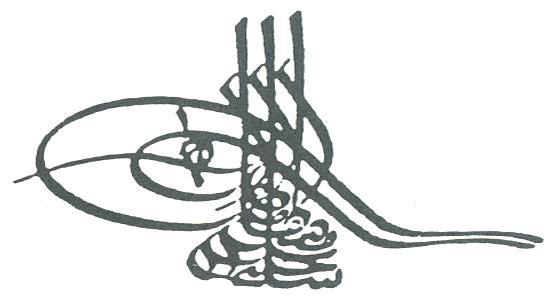
- Tughra

Selim III (Ottoman Turkish: سليم ثالث, romanized: Selim-i sâlis; Turkish: III. Selim; 24 December 1761 – 28 July 1808) was the sultan of the Ottoman Empire from 1789 to 1807.

He succeeded his uncle, Abdul Hamid I, in 1789 and sought to modernize the Ottoman Empire through military, administrative and educational reforms. He created the Nizam-i Cedid in 1797, a European-style army trained and equipped along modern lines. He also established permanent embassies in major European capitals and pursued closer diplomatic relations with foreign powers. His reign was marked by wars against Austria, Russia, and Revolutionary France, including Napoleon's invasion of Egypt. Regarded as an enlightened ruler, his reign saw significant patronage of music, poetry and the arts. He was eventually deposed and imprisoned by the Janissaries, who placed his cousin Mustafa on the throne as Mustafa IV (r. 1807–1808), and was imprisoned and assassinated in 1808.

== Early life ==
Selim III was the son of Sultan Mustafa III and his wife Mihrişah Sultan. His mother, Mihrişah Sultan was an ethnic Georgian. After she became the Valide sultan, she participated in reforming the government schools and establishing political corporations. His father, Ottoman Sultan Mustafa III, was very well educated and believed in the necessity of reforms. Mustafa III attempted to create a powerful army with professional, well-educated soldiers during peacetime. He declared new military regulations and opened maritime and artillery academies. This was primarily motivated by his fear of a Russian invasion. During the Russo-Turkish War, he fell ill and died of a heart attack in 1774.

Sultan Mustafa was significantly influenced by mysticism. An oracle predicted his son Selim would be a world conqueror, so he organized a seven-day joyous feast. Selim was very well educated in the palace. Sultan Mustafa III named his son his successor; however, Selim's uncle Abdul Hamid I ascended the throne after Mustafa's death. Sultan Abdul Hamid I took care of Selim and emphasized his education.

After Abdul Hamid's death, Selim succeeded him on 7 April 1789, at the age of 27. Sultan Selim III was very fond of literature and calligraphy; many of his works were put on the walls of mosques and convents. He wrote many poems, especially about Crimea's occupation by Russia. He spoke Arabic, Persian, Turkish and Old Bulgarian fluently. Selim III showed great importance to patriotism and religion. He demonstrated his poetry and music skills and was fond of fine arts and the army.

== Reign ==
=== Plans of reforms ===
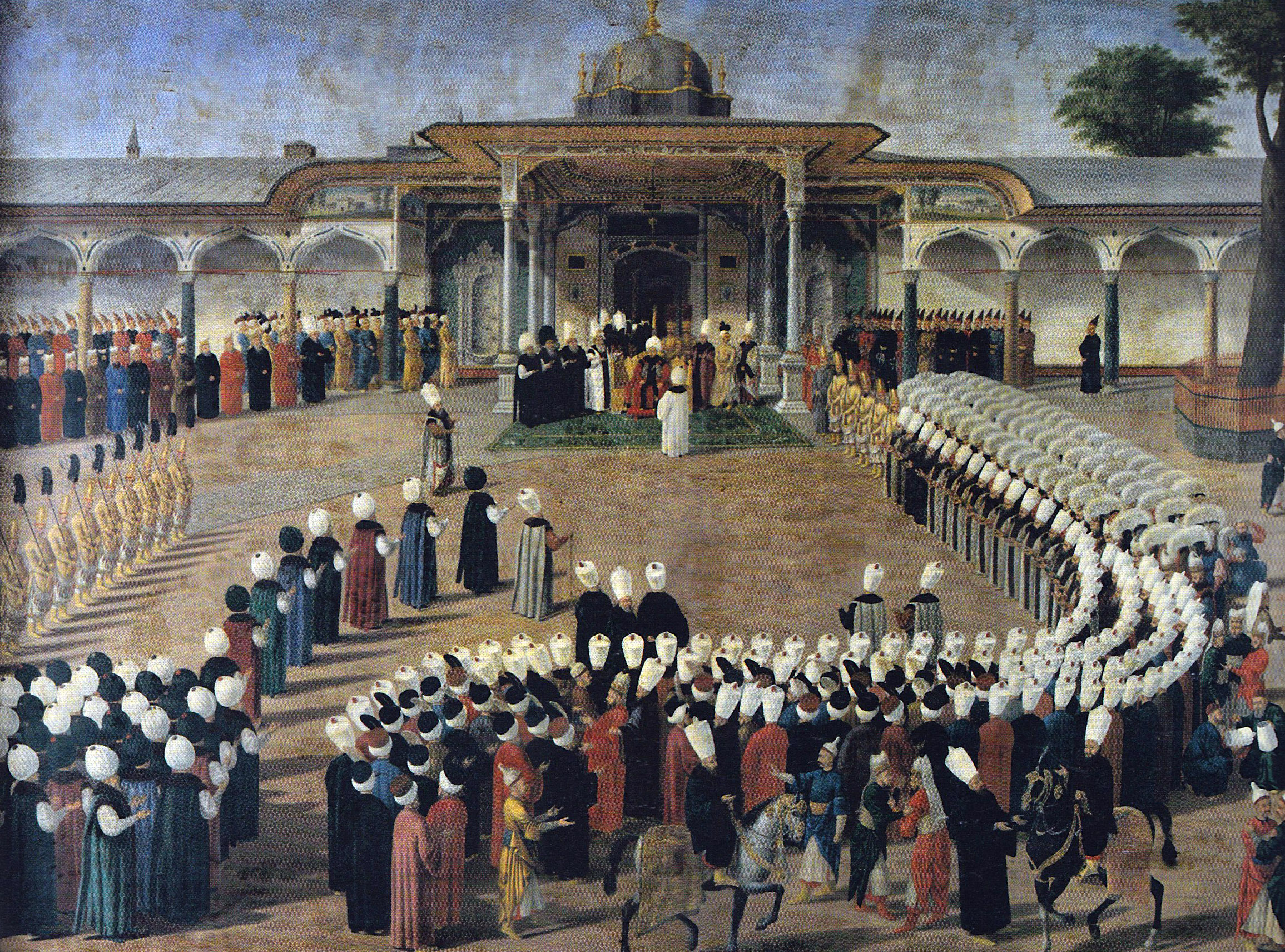
Selim III receiving dignitaries at an audience at the Gate of Felicity, Topkapı Palace.

Selim III was seen by contemporaries as capable and energetic, and his accession was met with expectations of reform. Having had extensive contact with Europeans, he believed reform of the Ottoman state was necessary.

However, Austria and Russia gave him no time for anything but defense, and it was not until the Peace of Iaşi (1792) that breathing space was allowed him in Europe, while Napoleon's invasion of Egypt and Syria soon called for the empire's most vigorous efforts.

Ottoman provinces from Egypt to Syria began implementing French policies and drifted away from Istanbul after Napoleon's attack.

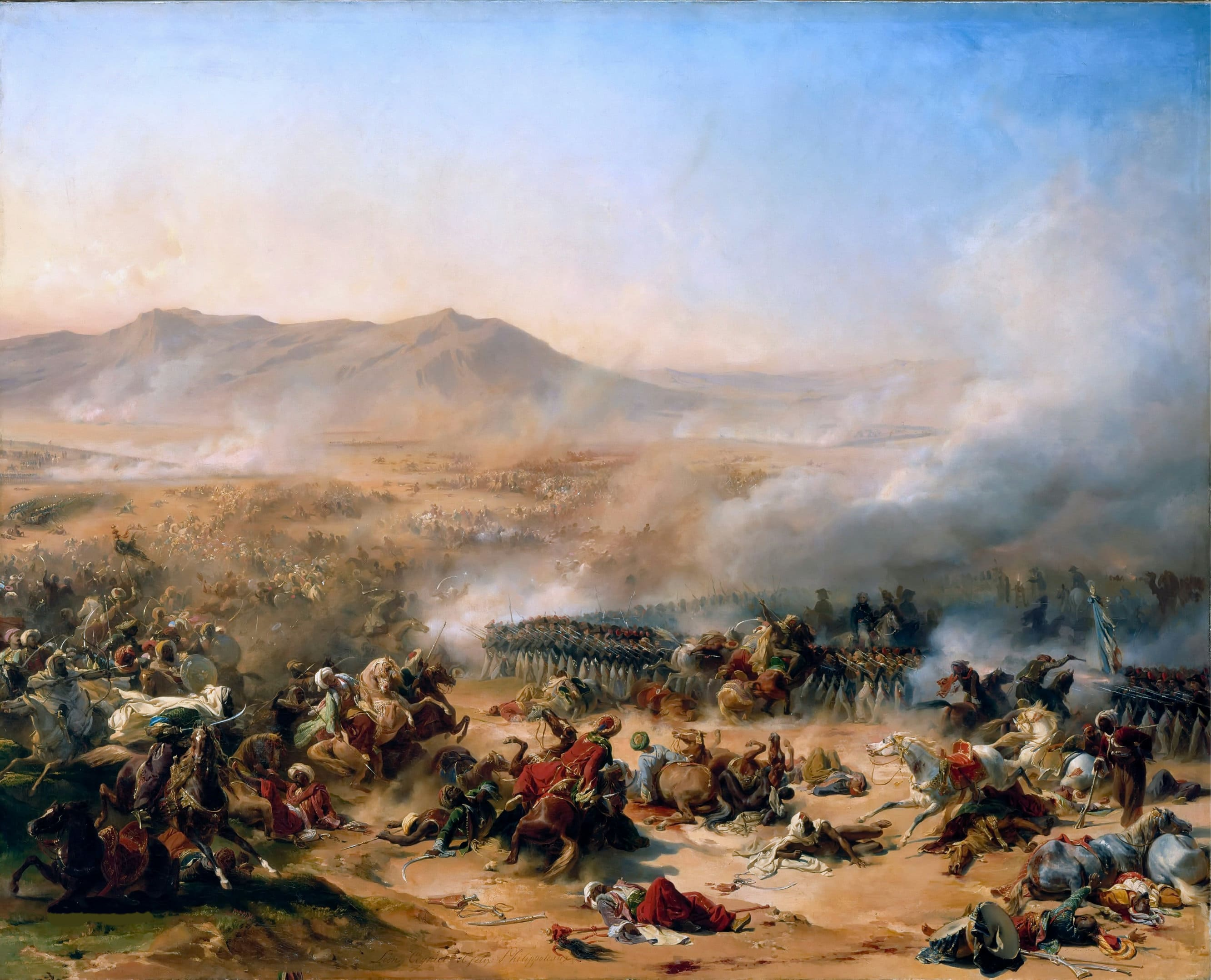
French campaign in Egypt and Syria against the Mamluk and Ottoman forces.

Selim III profited by the respite to abolish the military tenure of fiefs; he introduced salutary reforms into the administration, especially in the fiscal department, sought by well-considered plans to extend the spread of education, and engaged foreign officers as instructors, by whom a small corps of new troops called Nizam-I Cedid were collected and drilled in 1797. This unit comprised Turkish peasant youths from Anatolia and was supplied with modern weaponry.

These troops were able to hold their own against rebellious Janissaries in the Balkan provinces such as the Sanjak of Smederevo against its appointed Vizier Hadži Mustafa Pasha, where disaffected governors made no scruple of attempting to make use of them against the reforming sultan.

Emboldened by this success, Selim III issued an order that in the future, picked men should be taken annually from the Janissaries to serve in the Nizam-I Cedid. Selim III was unable to integrate the Nizam-I Cedid with the rest of the army which overall limited its role in defense of the state.

=== Foreign relations ===
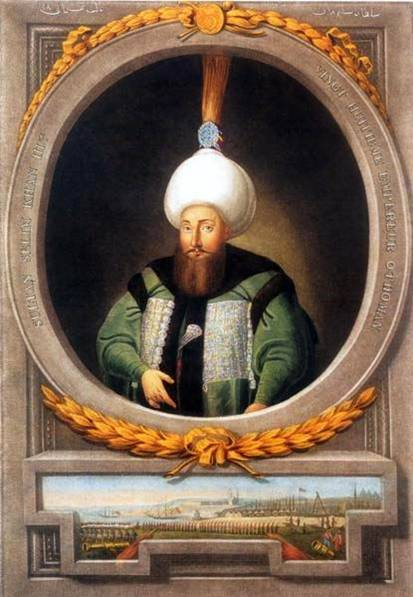
Portrait of Selim III by Konstantin Kapıdağlı, c. 1804–06

Selim III ascended the throne to find that the Ottoman Empire of old had been considerably reduced due to conflicts outside the realm. In the north, Russia had taken the Black Sea through the Treaty of Küçük Kaynarca in 1774. Selim realized the importance of diplomatic relations with other nations and pushed for permanent embassies in the courts of all the great nations of Europe, a hard task because of Christian religious prejudice towards Muslims. Even with the religious obstacles, resident embassies were established in Britain, France, Prussia and Austria. Selim, a cultured poet and musician, carried on an extended correspondence with Louis XVI. Although distressed by the establishment of the republic in France, the Ottoman government was soothed by French representatives in Constantinople who maintained the goodwill of various influential personages.

On 1 July 1798, however, French forces under Napoleon Bonaparte landed in Ottoman controlled Egypt, and Selim declared war on France. In alliance with Russia and Britain, the Turks were in periodic conflict with the French on land and sea until March 1801. Peace came in June 1802, but the following year brought new trouble in the Balkans. For decades, a sultan's word had had no power in outlying provinces, prompting Selim's reforms of the military to reimpose central control. This desire was not fulfilled. One rebellious leader was Austrian-backed Osman Pazvantoğlu, whose invasion of Wallachia in 1801 inspired Russian intervention, resulting in greater autonomy for the Danubian provinces. Serbian conditions also deteriorated. They took a fateful turn with the return of the hated Janissaries, ousted eight years before. These forces murdered Selim's enlightened governor, ending this province's best rule in the last 100 years. Neither arms nor diplomacy could restore Ottoman authority.

French influence with the Sublime Porte (the European diplomatic designation of the Ottoman state) did not revive. Still, it led the Sultan to defy St. Petersburg and London, and Turkey joined Napoleon's Continental System. War was declared on Russia on 27 December and on Britain in March 1807. Already in February of the same year, the British attacked the Dardanelles, which ended in nothing.

=== Janissary revolt ===
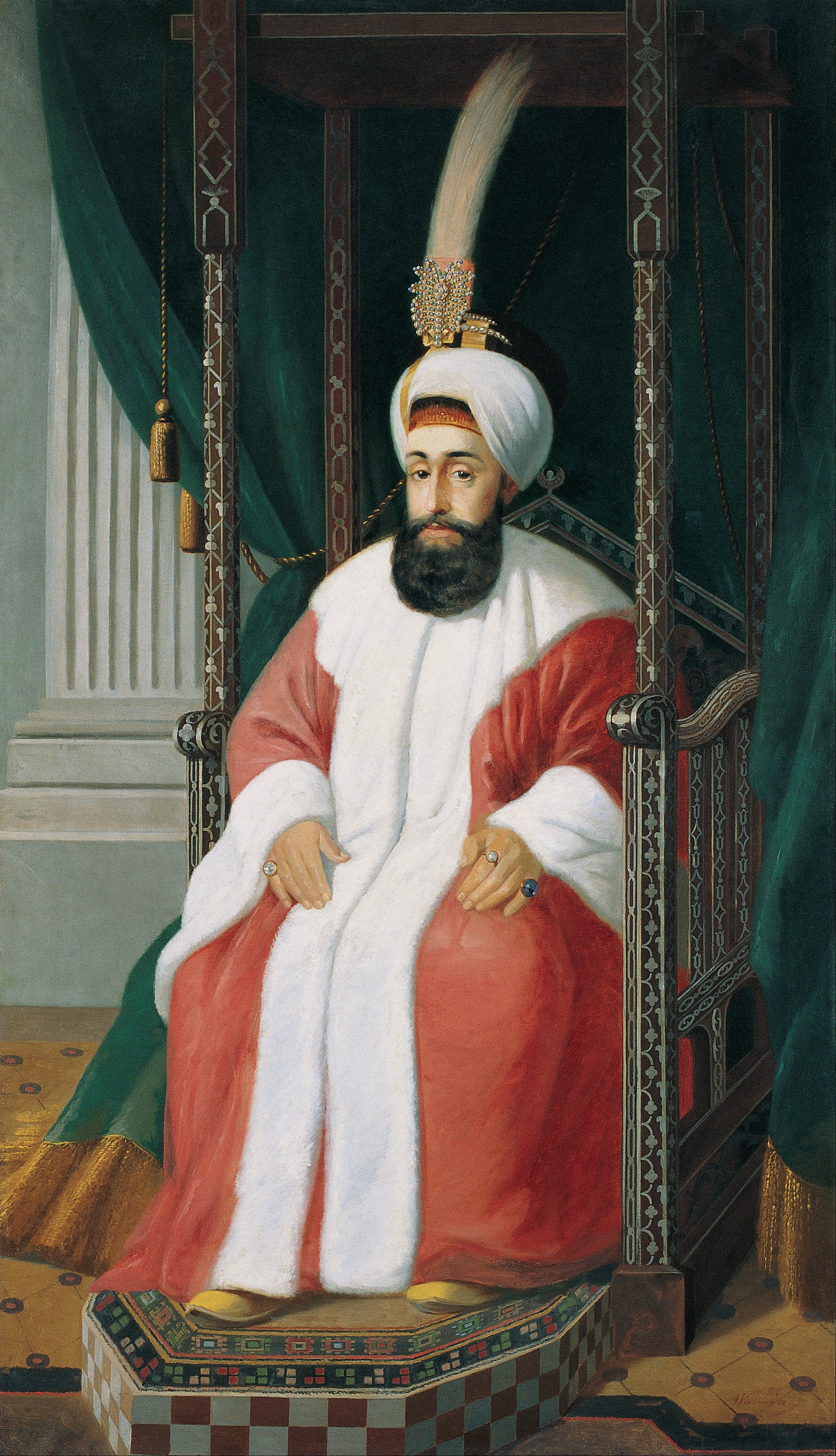
Portrait of Selim III by Joseph Warnia-Zarzecki, late 19th–early 20th century

The Sultan's most ambitious military project was the creation of an entirely new infantry corps fully trained and equipped according to the latest European standards. This unit, called the Nizam-i Cedid (the New Order), was formed in 1797 and adopted a pattern of recruitment that was uncommon for the imperial forces; it was composed of Turkish peasant youths from Anatolia, a clear indication that the devshirme system was no longer functional. Officered and trained by Europeans, the Nizam-i Cedid was outfitted with modern weapons and French-style uniforms. By 1806, the new army numbered around 23,000 troops, including a modern artillery corps, and its units performed effectively in minor actions. But Selim III's inability to integrate the force with the regular army and his reluctance to deploy it against his domestic opponents limited its role in defending the state it was created to preserve.

From the start of Selim's reign, the Janissaries had viewed this entire military reform program as a threat to their independence, and they refused to serve alongside the new army in the field. The powerful Derebeys (feudal vassals) were alarmed by how the Sultan financed his new forces—he confiscated timars and directed the other revenue toward the Nizam-i Cedid. Further opposition came from the ulama (religious scholars) and other ruling elite members who objected to the European models on which Selim based his military reforms.

Led by the rebellious Janissaries, these forces came together in 1806, deposed Selim III, and selected a successor, Mustafa IV, who pledged not to interfere with their privileges. The decree of deposition accused Selim III of failing to respect Islam's religion and the Ottomans' tradition. Over the next year, the embassies in Europe were dismantled, the Nizam-i Cedid troops were dispersed, and the deposed Sultan, whose cautious military reforms were intended to do no more than preserve the tradition of the Ottomans, was murdered.

=== Austro-Turkish War (1788–91) ===
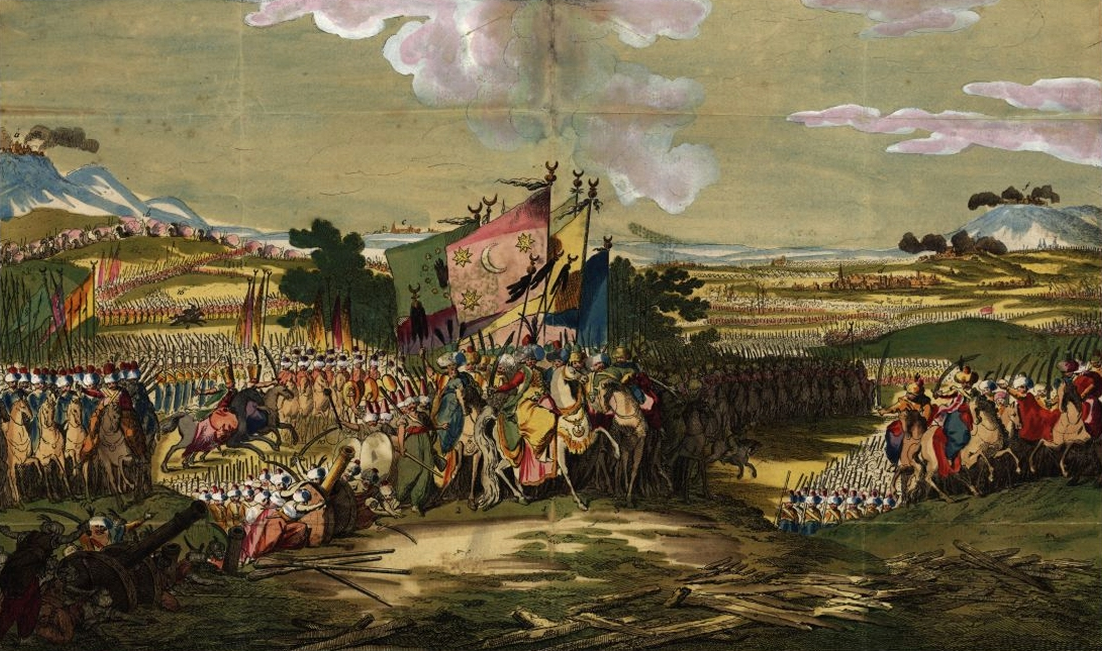
The main Ottoman army led by the Grand Vizier advancing to Sofia in May 1788

The Austro-Turkish War (1788–1791) was an inconclusive struggle between the Austrian and Ottoman Empires. It took place at the same time as the Russo-Turkish War of 1787–1792, during the reign of the Ottoman Sultan Selim III.

=== Russo-Turkish wars ===
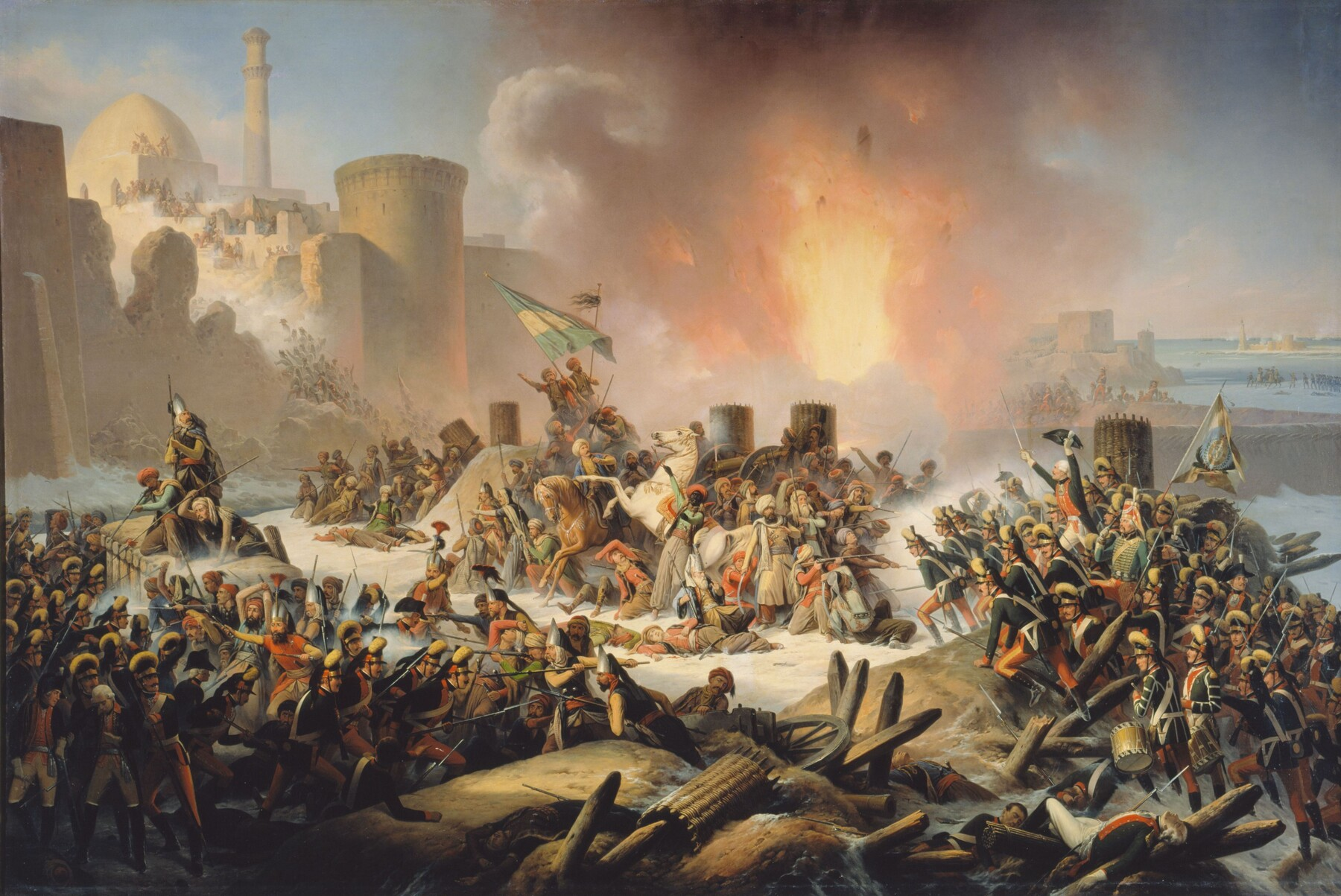
Ottoman troops desperately attempt to halt advancing Russians during the Siege of Ochakov (1788).

The first major Russo-Turkish War (1768–1774) began after Turkey demanded that Russian Empress Catherine II the Great abstain from interfering in Poland's internal affairs. The Russians won impressive victories over the Turks. They captured Azov, the Crimea, and Bessarabia, and under Field Marshal Pyotr Rumyantsev, they overran Moldavia and also defeated the Turks in Bulgaria. The Turks were compelled to seek peace, concluding in the Treaty of Küçük Kaynarca. This treaty made the Crimean khanate independent of the Turkish sultan and advanced the Russian frontier. Russia was now in a much stronger position to expand, and in 1783 Catherine annexed the Crimean Peninsula outright.

In the Russo-Turkish War (1787–1792), Austria was again on the side of Russia. Under General Alexander Suvorov, the Russians won several victories that gave them control of the lower Dniester and Danube rivers. Further Russian successes compelled the Turks to sign the Treaty of Jassy on 9 January 1792, by which Turkey ceded the entire western Ukrainian Black Sea coast to Russia. When Turkey deposed the Russophile governors of Moldavia and Wallachia in 1806, the Russo-Turkish War (1806–1812) broke out, though in a desultory fashion since Russia was reluctant to concentrate large forces against Turkey while its relations with Napoleonic France were so uncertain. But in 1811, with the prospect of war between France and Russia in sight, the latter sought a quick decision on its southern frontier. Russian field marshal Mikhail Kutuzov’s victorious campaign of 1811–1812 forced the Turks to sign the Treaty of Bucharest (1812) on 18 May, ending the war. Turkey ceded Bessarabia to Russia.

In the treaty, Russia also secured amnesty and a promise of autonomy for the Serbs, who had rebelled against Turkish rule, but Turkish troops would re-occupy fortresses in Serbia. Several disputes forestalled the treaty's implementation, and Turkish troops invaded Serbia again the following year.

=== Relations with Tipu Sultan ===
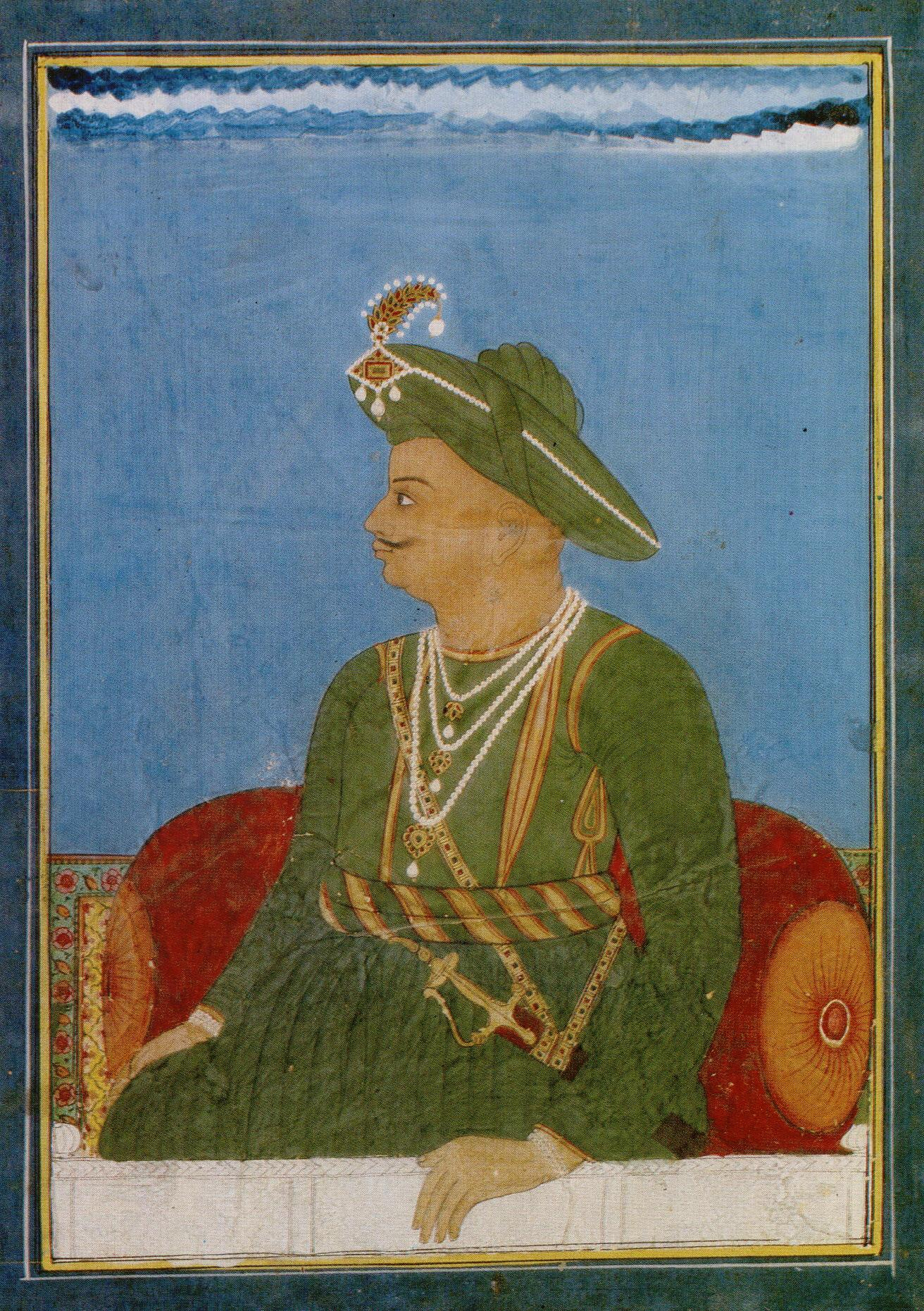
Portrait of Tipu Sultan

Tipu Sultan was an independent ruler of the Sultanate of Mysore, with high regard for loyalty to the Mughal Emperor Shah Alam II. He had urgently requested Ottoman assistance during the Third Anglo-Mysore War, in which he had suffered an irreversible defeat. Tipu Sultan then began to consolidate his relations with France. In an attempt to support and open a route to link up with Tipu Sultan, Napoleon invaded Ottoman Egypt in the year 1798, causing a furor in Constantinople.

The British then appealed to Selim III to send a letter to Tipu Sultan requesting the Sultanate of Mysore to halt its state of war against the British East India Company. Selim III then wrote a letter to Tipu Sultan criticizing the French and also informed Tipu Sultan that the Ottomans would act as an intermediary between the Sultanate of Mysore and the British. Tipu Sultan wrote twice to Selim III, rejecting the advice of the Ottomans; before most of his letters could arrive in Constantinople, the Fourth Anglo-Mysore War broke out and Tipu Sultan was killed during the Siege of Seringapatam (1799).

=== Alcohol prohibition ===
Many Ottoman sultans imposed alcohol bans (often with limited success). Despite Selim III's hardline stance on alcohol consumption and threats to execute Christians and Jews caught selling wine or rakı to Muslims, it proved extremely difficult to curtail alcohol consumption in Istanbul, where wines were locally produced, and the city had many established wine-houses serving its non-Muslim residents.

== 1806 Edirne Incident ==
The 1806 Edirne Incident was an armed confrontation between the New Order Troops (Nizam-I Cedid) of Ottoman Sultan Selim III and a coalition of Balkan magnates, the ayans, and the region's Janissary garrisons that occurred in Thrace throughout the summer of 1806. The cause of the incident was Selim III's attempt to expand the New Order's permanent presence into Rumelia by establishing New Order barracks in the region's cities. The outcome of the confrontation was the retreat of imperial forces to Istanbul and Anatolia, which constituted a death blow to Selim III's ambitions of expanding his reformed army and a major blow to his legitimacy. This deteriorated image would result in his deposition the following May.

== Downfall and assassination ==
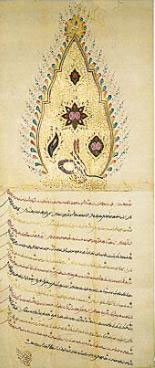
An official Ottoman, Firman by Sultan Selim III appointing François Pouqueville as the representative of France in the court of Ali Pasha of Janina.

Selim III was under the influence of French ambassador to the Porte Horace Sébastiani, and the fleet was compelled to retire without effecting its purpose. However, the anarchy, manifest or latent, existing throughout the provinces proved too great for Selim III to cope with. The Janissaries rose once more in revolt, induced the Sheikh ul-Islam to grant a fatwa against the reforms, dethroned and imprisoned Selim III, and placed his cousin Mustafa on the throne, as Mustafa IV (1807–1808), on 29 May 1807.

The ayan of Rustchuk, Alemdar Mustafa, a strong partisan of the reforms, collected an army of 40,000 men and marched on Constantinople to reinstate Selim III, but he came too late. The ill-fated reforming sultan had been stabbed in the seraglio by the Chief Black Eunuch and his men. Upon his arrival in the capital, Bairakdar's only resource was to wreak his vengeance on Mustafa IV and to place on the throne Mahmud II (1808–1839), the sole surviving member of the House of Osman.

Another version about his murder states that at the time of his deposition, Selim was staying at the Harem. The night of Thursday, 28 July 1808, he was with two of his consorts, Refet Kadın and Pakize Hanım. Alemdar Mustafa Pasha, a loyalist of Selim, was approaching the city with his army to reinstate Selim. Therefore, Mustafa IV gave orders to murder him and his brother Prince Mahmud.

The assassins were a group of men, including the Master of the Wardrobe, Fettah the Georgian, the Treasury steward Ebe Selim, and a black eunuch named Nezir Ağa. Selim knew his end was coming when he saw their swords drawn. Pakize Hanım threw herself between them and her lord; she was cut in her hand. Refet Kadın started screaming in terror, and another slave girl who rushed in fainted when she saw what was about to happen. A struggle ensued, and the former sultan was cut down and murdered, his last words being "Allahu Akbar" ("God is great").

Refet Kadın threw herself on the body but was dragged away. The body was quickly wrapped in a quilt. The assassins moved on to find Prince Mahmud and attempted to murder him. He was more fortunate and later ordered the assassins to be executed. Selim III would be the only Ottoman sultan killed by a sword. He was buried in Laleli Mosque near his father's tomb.

== Interest in poetry and arts ==
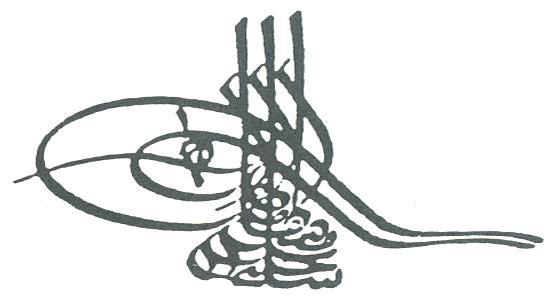
Selim III's tughra, or official seal.

A great music lover, Sultan Selim III was a composer and performer of significant talent. He created fourteen makams (melodic types), three of which are in current use today. Sixty-four compositions by Selim III are known today, some of which are part of the regular repertory of Turkish classical music performance. Aside from composing music, Selim III also performed on the ney (reed flute) and tanbur (long-necked, fretted lute).

Selim III's interest in music started in his days as a prince when he studied under Kırımlı Ahmet Kamil Efendi and Tanburi İzak Efendi. He was exceptionally respectful of Tanburi İzak Efendi, and it is recounted that the Sultan rose in respect when Tanburi İzak Efendi entered the court.

As a patron of the arts, Selim III encouraged musicians of his day, including Dede Efendi and Baba Hamparsum. The Hamparsum notation system that Selim commissioned became the dominant notation for Turkish and Armenian music. His name is associated with a school in Turkish classical music due to the revival and rebirth of music at his court. Selim III was also interested in Western music and, in 1797, invited an opera troupe for the first opera performance in the Ottoman Empire.

Writing under the nom de plume İlhami, Selim's poetry is collected in a divan. Among regular attendees of his court was Şeyh Galib, considered one of the four greatest Ottoman poets. Galib is now believed to have been not only an intimate friend of the Sultan, as they were both relatively close in age, but through Galib's poetry, there is overwhelming support for his new military reforms.

Selim III was a member of the Mevlevi Order of Sufi dervishes and entered into the order at the Galata Mevlevihanesi under the name Selim Dede. He was a renowned composer, creating many musical compositions, including a Mevlevi ayin, a long and complex liturgical form performed during the semâ (religious ceremonies) of the Mevlevi Order, in the makam Suzidilara.

He extended his patronage to Antoine Ignace Melling, appointed court architect in 1795. Melling constructed several palaces and other buildings for the Sultan and created engravings of contemporary Constantinople.

== Family ==
Selim III had numerous consorts, but no children.

=== Consorts ===
Selim III had at least thirteen consorts:

- Nefizar Kadın. Baş Kadin (first consort). Also called Nafizar, Safizar or Sefizar. She died on 30 May 1792 and was buried in the Laleli Mosque.
- Afitab Kadın. She became Baş Kadin after Nefizar's death. She died in 1807.
- Zibifer Kadın. Also called Ziybülfer. After Selim's assassination, she lived in a palace on the Bosphorus. She died on 10 March 1817 and was buried in the Büyük Selimiye in Üsküdar.
- Tabisefa Kadın. After the assassination of Selim III, she lived in the Fındıklı Palace. She died on 14 March 1855 and was buried in the Laleli mosque.
- Refet Kadın. She was born in 1777. She was one of two concubines who tried to prevent Selim's murder. Refet threw herself on the sultan to protect him but was thrown away and had to watch the killers finish the job while she screamed, cried, and tore her hair. She died on 22 October 1867 and was buried in the Mihrişah Sultan mausoleum in Eyüp.
- Nüruşems Kadın. She died in May 1826 and was buried in the Laleli mosque.
- Hüsnümah Kadın. She received the income of Tire. She died in 1814 and was buried in the Laleli mosque.
- Demhoş Kadın. She became one of the consorts in 1799. She probably died around 1806.
- Goncenigar Kadın. She died after 1806.
- Mahbube Kadın. She died after 1806.
- Aynısefa Kadın. She died after 1794.
- Pakize Hanım. BaşIkbal, she was one of the major favorites. She was one of the two consorts who tried to prevent Selim's murder. Pakize threw herself between the assassins and the sultan and was wounded in the hand in the struggle.
- Meryem Hanim. She died on 22 August 1807.

== See also ==
- Kuguzade Suleyman Pasha

== Ancestry ==
Ancestors of Selim III

8. Mehmed IV
4. Ahmed III
9. Gülnuş Sultan
2. Mustafa III
5. Mihrişah Kadın
1. Selim III
3. Mihrişah Sultan

== Bibliography ==
- Basaran, Betul. Selim III, Social Control and Policing in Istanbul at the End of the Eighteenth Century: Between Crisis and Order (Leiden: Brill, 2014)
- Sakul, Kahraman. "Innovation and Empire in Turkey: Sultan Selim III and the Modernisation of the Ottoman Navy." International Journal of Turkish Studies 19.1/2 (2013): 158.
- Shaw, Stanford J. (1965). "The Origins of Ottoman Military Reform: The Nizam-I Cedid Army of Sultan Selim III". The Journal of Modern History. 37 (3): 291–306. doi:10.1086/600691. JSTOR 1875404. S2CID 145786017.
- Shaw, Stanford J. Between Old and New: The Ottoman Empire under Sultan Selim III, 1789-1807 (Harvard University Press, 1971) online review
- Shaw, Stanford J. "The origins of Ottoman military reform: the Nizam-i Cedid army of Sultan Selim III." Journal of Modern History 37.3 (1965): 291-306. online
- Yassin, Qasim and Hamid Hajianpour. "The New Order of Sultan Selim III: The Turning Point of the Ottoman Empire's Tendency towards Modern Reforms (1789-1807)." The History of Islamic Culture and Civilization A Quarterly Research Journal 10.37 (2020): 87-98.
- Zorlu, Tuncay. Sultan Selim III and the Modernisation of the Ottoman Navy (London, I.B. Tauris, 2011).

Selim III House of Osman Born: 24 December 1761 Died: 28 July 1808
Regnal titles
Preceded by Abdul Hamid I	Sultan of the Ottoman Empire; 7 April 1789 – 29 May 1807	Succeeded by Mustafa IV
Sunni Islam titles
Preceded by Abdul Hamid I	Caliph of the Ottoman Caliphate; 7 April 1789 – 29 May 1807	Succeeded by Mustafa IV
