= Kuguzade Suleyman Pasha =

Ottoman governor of Trabzon

Kuguzade Suleyman Pasha was appointed by Sultan Selim III as the governor of Trabzon state in 1791. The Sultan's order was received after the critical loss of Anapa Fortress to Russians, which was regarded as the gate to Caucasus for the Ottomans, in 1791 and also the deterioration of the public order. The governor responsible of the loss of Anapa was Sari Abdullah Pasha, and the Ottoman Sultan Selim III requested his execution to Kuguzade Suleyman Pasha. Then, Sari Abdullah Pasha was trapped and executed in Erzurum by Kuguzade in the same year. His governorship lasted for eight months. During the rule of Kuguzade, public order was achieved again, and further attacks to Russians were managed.

Today, his grave still can be seen in the family graveyard of Kugu & Kuguoglu family in Cavuslu town of Giresun, located as adjacent to Black Sea Highway. His Ottoman Style impressive gravestone, after having endured the many looting attempts, still worthwhile to see.
