= Kara Mahmud's campaign against Venice =

Military campaign in 1786 in Dalmatia

Kara Mahmud's campaign against Venice Fushata e Kara Mahmudit kundër Venedikut
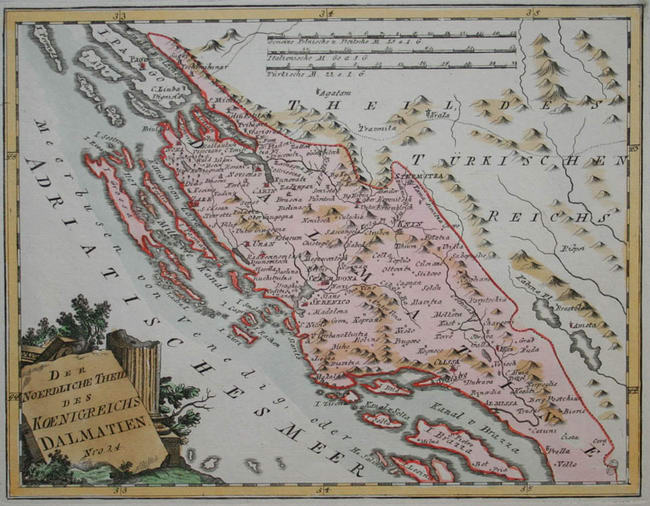
- Map of Venetian Dalmatia in 1791, five years after the conflict
Date	March–June 1786
Location	Venetian Dalmatia
Result	Scutari victory

Belligerents
Pashalik of Scutari; Montenegro	Republic of Venice

Commanders and leaders
Kara Mahmud Pasha	Paolo Renier

Strength
Unknown; 500 irregulars	Unknown

Kara Mahmud's campaign against Venice (Albanian: Fushata e Kara Mahmudit kundër Venedikut) was a military offensive led by the Ottoman vassal Pashalik of Scutari, under Kara Mahmud Pasha, involving a series of raids and sieges targeting the Republic of Venice, particularly its holdings in Dalmatia. The campaign concluded with Venice agreeing to pay tribute to Kara Mahmud Pasha.

== Background ==
During the expansionist wars led by Kara Mahmud Pasha, the Pashalik of Scutari frequently clashed with the Republic of Venice, which often financed Montenegrin rebellions against the Pashas of Scutari. In 1785, after Kara Mahmud invaded Montenegro and forced the Montenegrins to pay tribute, he returned to his capital, Scutari, by passing through Paštrovići territory, which was under Venetian control. While passing through, fighting erupted between the Scutari army and local Paštrovići clan members who attempted to assassinate Kara Mahmud Pasha. After the Scutari army achieved victory, Kara Mahmud massacred over 200 locals from the Paštrovići region. He also ordered the destruction of monasteries and the burning of numerous homes, leaving the area devastated. On June 30, after beheading the tribe’s notables, Mahmud proceeded to Tivar (Bar) and, with the aid of his waiting fleet, returned to Scutari. This incident deeply angered the Venetians.

Shortly after the Montenegro campaign, Kara Mahmud launched another offensive, this time against Ahmet Kurt Pasha of the Pashalik of Berat, a Venetian ally. Kara Mahmud decisively defeated Ahmet Kurt Pasha, significantly weakening his realm. In response, the Republic of Venice lodged a complaint with the Sublime Porte, which declared Kara Mahmud a rebel against the Ottoman State. This declaration led to the outbreak of war between the Ottoman Empire and the Pashalik of Shkodër.

Venice's intervention against Kara Mahmud at the Sublime Porte further infuriated the Pasha. Venetian spy Father Erazmo da Banjo, stationed in Kara Mahmud’s court, reported to Venice on December 22, 1785, that in the Bushatlli palace, there was constant talk of forcing Venice to pay tribute:

"...qui non si parla in Seraglio, e da piu Signori Adirenti al Passa, che presto si deve prender a Venezia un buon Tributo, che molti poi lo fanno arrivare a 20 e 30 mille Zecchini, ed’ io stesso l’ho inteso dalla boca istessa del Passa, non ho dieci, giorni, che iscialla kemi mar Venedicut gni arac fort’ imir, e che faranno gl’ allaggienenti sotto Zara sulla primavera..."

Translated:

"... in the Seraglio and among many lords close to the Pasha, there is talk that soon Venice will have to pay a substantial tribute, estimated by some at 20 or 30 thousand zecchini. I myself heard it from the Pasha’s mouth less than ten days ago, saying Inshallah we shall take a strong tribute from Venice and that they will campaign under Zara in the spring..."

Note: The bold text is in Albanian.

The Russian campaigns in Crimea and the Greek revolts incited by Catherine II led to Koca Yusuf Pasha, the governor of Morea, being appointed grand vizier in January 1786. As a friend of Kara Mahmud and aware of Ali Pasha's valor during Ottoman campaigns in the Balkans, Koca Yusuf Pasha pardoned all three Albanian pashas on March 5, 1786. He requested that the imperial council restore them to their former positions, effectively bringing an end to the temporary conflicts between the Ottoman Empire and the Pashalik of Scutari.

== Campaign ==
After receiving his pardon from the Sublime Porte, Kara Mahmud set out to exact revenge on Venice by imposing tribute on its Dalmatian territories. On March 24, 1786, he left Shkodër for Podgorica, where he rallied around 500 Montenegrin highlanders, seeking their support for his campaign against Venice.

Throughout April 1786, the Pasha of Shkodër launched a series of raids and sieges against Venice, culminating in a major assault at the end of May. Leading Albanian forces, he marched through Montenegro and Bosnia, subjugating Venetian cities such as Nogoste and Ražanj, and capturing significant Venetian territories along the Adriatic coast. As a symbol of victory, he sent ten heads of Venetians (from Rizanja) and rebellious Slavs to Shkodër on June 12, 1786.

The High Porte and grand vizier Koca Yusuf Pasha, as before, were pleased with Kara Mahmud's successful campaign against Venetian holdings. Rather than heeding Venice's complaints in Istanbul, they rewarded Kara Mahmud with the title of vizier. With no other options, the Venetians were forced to meet the tribute demands. The city of Kotor offered Kara Mahmud 200,000 Akçe for tribute, despite his original demand of 500,000. After prolonged negotiations between the two sides, Kara Mahmud ultimately received 150,000 Akçe as compensation from the Republic of Venice. However, this was only a temporary solution, as Venice's possessions remained crucial to Kara Mahmud Pasha, not only for the security of his district but also to sever the ties between the Austrian Empire and the Montenegrins.

== Aftermath ==
Kara Mahmud's advances extended beyond the Venetian Dalmatian territories, with his troops pushing into Bosnia, Kosovo, Macedonia, and Serbia, where they imposed Bushatlli rule. However, his growing power deeply alarmed the Sublime Porte. At one point, Kara Mahmud's forces even seized the salaries of the janissaries in Belgrade. These aggressive campaigns against Ottoman interests led the Sublime Porte to once again declare Kara Mahmud a rebel, sparking a renewed outbreak of war between the Pashalik of Shkodër and the Ottoman Empire.

== Sources ==
- Gjeli, Ardit (2018), BETWEEN REBELLION AND OBEDIENCE: THE RISE AND FALL OF BUSHATLI MAHMUD PASHA OF SHKODRA (1752-1796) (PDF), İstanbul Şehir University. PDF
- Jazexhi, Olsi (2018), Kara Mmahmud Pashë Bushati, Bualli i Shkodrës (1776–1796 ER/1190–1211 AH) (PDF), Dielli, archived (PDF) from the original on 2018-08-19
