= Third Scutari-Berat War =

Third war between Scutari and Berat

Third Scutari-Berat War Lufta e Tretë Shkodër-Berat
| Date | 1778–13 April 1780 |
| Location | Pashalik of Berat |
| Result | Scutari victory, See aftermath |
| Territorial changes | Border of 1775 re-established. |

Belligerents
| Pashalik of Scutari | Pashalik of Berat: Toptani family |

Commanders and leaders
| Kara Mahmud Pasha; Suleiman Beg; Ibrahim Beg (surrendered) | Ahmet Kurt Pasha; Suleiman Pasha |

The Third Scutari-Berat War (Albanian: Lufta e Tretë Shkodër-Berat) was a military conflict between the Pashalik of Scutari under Kara Mahmud Pasha and the Pashalik of Berat under Ahmet Kurt Pasha.

== Background ==
After taking power in the Pashalik of Scutari, Kara Mahmud sought to avoid direct confrontation with the Pashalik of Berat. Ahmet Kurt Pasha had a significant number of armed troops at his disposal, making any confrontation a risky endeavor. Additionally, the relationship between the Bushatlis and the Sublime Porte was already strained, adding further complications. Any attack that could disturb the balance in the region would have faced severe suppression from the Ottomans, which had recently managed to resolve the conflict between the two Pashaliks.

On the other hand, the Pasha of Berat, Ahmet Kurt Pasha, also adopted a passive approach. Despite losing control over the Sanjak of Durrës to Hasan Aga of Istanbul and Adem Aga of the Toptanis, Ahmet Kurt Pasha was entrusted with the responsibility of maintaining security in the region. Moreover, since both sides relied heavily on trade as a source of income, the two pashas granted permission for commercial activities to all merchants, ensuring continued economic engagement in the area. Relations between Kara Mahmud and Ahmet Kurt Pasha worsened in 1778. The Pasha of Berat reopened an old matter that had arisen in 1775. At that time, Esma Sultan granted the Sanjak of Durrës back to Ahmet Kurt Pasha. Kara Mahmud opposed the decision by confiscating merchandise belonging to Mitro Berati, who was a close associate to Ahmet Kurt Pasha. In response, Ahmet Kurt Pasha demanded compensation for the loss. Kara Mahmud opposed the request. Following this Ahmet Kurt Pasha arrested merchants from Scutari and seized their goods. In response, Kara Mahmud arrested merchants from Tirana and Krujë. These incidents marked the beginning of a regional conflict between the two pashas in Albania. Kara Mahmud saw this as an opportunity to regain the Sanjak of Durrës. Soon Kara Mahmud prepared for a war that would decide the fate of the Pashalik of Scutari.

The opportunity arose for Kara Mahmud when Ahmet Kurt Pasha was dismissed from his position as Sanjak-bey of the Sanjak of Avlona. The loss of Avlonasignificantly weakened Ahmet Kurt Pasha's power and influence in Albania. Additionally, Kara Mahmud build an alliance with Ali Pasha Tepelena, Pasha of Yanina, who was gaining influence in southern Albania, making things more difficult for the Ahmet Kurt Pasha. With these developments, Kara Mahmud gained a more advantageous position against Ahmet Kurt Pasha. However, instead of engaging in direct warfare, Kara Mahmud first aimed to eliminate Ahmet Kurt Pasha's allies in the Sanjak of Durrës.

== War ==
=== First phase and Kara Mahmud's offensive in central Albania ===
==== Kara Mahmud's conquest of Tirana ====
Kara Mahmud capitalized on the chaos between the Sublime Porte and sent Ibrahim Beg, an old puppet of the Bushatlis, to Tirana to claim the city. Recognizing the strategic importance of Tirana near Durrës, Kara Mahmud aimed to weaken Ahmet Kurt Pasha's influence and remove one of his allies, Islam Beg, in central Albania. Kara Mahmud deployed five hundred soldiers led by Zenel Aga Melika of Lezhë to support Ibrahim Beg in retaking the city. Ibrahim Aga and his troops faced minimal resistance, and the city's notable figures warmly welcomed and accompanied him to his office. After Ibrahim Beg regained control of the city, his faction launched an attack on the estates of Islam Beg, looting them and eventually setting fire to his palace. Hasan Aga, who was responsible for tax-farming in Durrës and had his base in Tirana, did not resist or oppose Ibrahim Beg's takeover of the city. Another ally of Ahmet Kurt Pasha, Adem Aga of the Toptani, fled to Krujë.

==== Kara Mahmud's conquest of Kavajë ====
The situation in Kavajë escalated rapidly after Ibrahim Beg was reaffirmed as the new ruler of Tirana. Halil Pasha, another ally of Ahmet Kurt Pasha, fearing that he might be next after the overthrow of Islam Beg, started taking measures against Suleiman Beg from the Bushati faction. In an attempt to bring an end to the chaos, Hasan Aga was appointed as the subcontractor for Esma Sultan's estates in Durrës. He then sought support from Kara Mahmud, who seemingly distanced himself from the events unfolding in central Albania. Upon receiving the official request, the Kara Mahmud saw an opportunity to regain control over the Sanjak of Durrës and central Albania. He swiftly mobilized an army of six thousand troops and on May 8th 1779, Kara Mahmud entered Kavajë. There, Kara Mahmud read decrees blaming Halil Pasha and Sali Beg for oppressing the population, leading to the burning of their palaces and looting of their estates. In addition, after eliminating the dissenting voices in Kavajë, Suleiman Beg was reinstated as the ruler of the region, solidifying Kara Mahmud's influence in central Albania once again.

==== Kara Mahmud's raid on Krujë ====
After the events in Kavajë, Kara Mahmud proceeded to Krujë with the intention of permanently dealing with the Toptani family, who posed a continuous threat to the interests of the Pashalik of Scutari. Upon arriving in Krujë, Kara Mahmud encountered no resistance and proceeded to raid the city and set fire to over one hundred houses in the outskirts of the castle where the Toptanis were located, enjoying a well-protected position. Meanwhile, the Toptani supporters were causing trouble for Ibrahim of Tirana by looting his estates and attacking his palace.

Being mindful of the situation, Kara Mahmud chose not to launch a full-scale attack on the Castle of Krujë, as he feared it could lead to a conflict between him and the Sublime Porte. Instead, he decided to withdraw his troops back to Scutari while awaiting an official decree that would grant him permission to eliminate the Toptanis, thereby putting an end to the prevailing anarchy and diminishing the influence of Ahmet Kurt Pasha in central Albania. Kara Mahmud's campaign can be considered successful as he effectively strengthened his control over central Albania and exerted his influence over Durrës during the offensive.

=== Second phase and Ahmet Kurt's attempted Overthrow ===
The Sublime Porte implemented various measures to counteract potential challenges to its authority emanating from regional power brokers within the Ottoman Empire. Even though local leaders were important for making the Ottoman tax system work smoothly, the central government made sure no one got too powerful and challenged its authority. Among these influential figures was Kara Mahmud Pasha, who, akin to his actions in Durrës, sought to assert his own dominance at the expense of Sublime Porte. Recognizing this threat, the Ottoman central administration sought to neutralize Kara Mahmud Pasha by offering him another position in a distant Sanjak far from Shkodra, where his influence posed a challenge to governance. Consequently, following the pacification of unrest in central Albania and the reinstatement of Ahmet Kurt Pasha to his former position, Kara Mahmud was appointed as the Pasha of the Sanjak of Izvornik, assuming responsibility for the protection of the fortress.

The deployment of Mahmud Pasha to a remote sanjak away from Shkodra served as a strategic maneuver by the Sublime Porte to halt his activities. Isolated from his traditional power base, Mahmud would find himself stripped of support against both central authorities and local adversaries, thereby facilitating his potential elimination by the Bosnian kapudans or other actors aligned with the Sublime Porte. However, aware of the consequences of such a relocation, Kara Mahmud Pasha turned down the offer from the Sublime Porte because he knew it would be risky to leave the area where he was familiar. Making things worse, his rival Çavuşoğlu Mehmed Pasha was made the new governor of Shkodra. The Çavuşoğlu family, who were Albanians from Shkodra, had a long history of rivalry with the Bushatlis for control of the city. The central government hoped that by supporting the Çavuşoğlu family, they could weaken the Bushatli influence in Shkodra and attack their power from different angles.

The conflict restarted when the Toptanis, encouraged by Ahmet Kurt Pasha, went after Kara Mahmud's ally, Ibrahim Beg of Tirana. To stop them, Kara Mahmud Pasha sent Zenel Aga of Lezha to deal with the Toptanis, successfully defeating them in battle. This clash however gave Kara Mahmud's enemies a chance to complain to the Sublime Porte. This led to the quick deployment of Çavuşoğlu Mehmed and other Albanian leaders to Shkodra, aiming to force Kara Mahmud to obey orders or possibly remove him from power altogether. The leader of the military campaign was Ahmet Kurt Pasha, backed by influential Albanians like the Toptanis, Suleiman Pasha of Elbasan, and the Beylerbey of Rumelia. Together they planned to take over Shkodra and weaken Kara Mahmud by getting rid of his allies, Ibrahim Beg of Tirana and Suleiman Beg of Kavaja.

Kara Mahmud refused to follow the Sublime Porte's orders, sticking to his position in Shkodra. Taking advantage of Suleiman Beg's resistance in Kavaja, Mahmud's father-in-law, Ibrahim Beg, gathered a strong force to defend Tirana against the advancing enemies. This slowed down Kurd Pasha's progress and gave Mahmud's remaining ally in central Albania more time. Despite a long siege, Ibrahim Beg eventually gave in because of a lack of supplies, allowing Kurd Pasha to take control of Durrës and move against Shkodra. But all the efforts to remove Mahmud from power failed in the end, as the central government pardoned him for his past actions.

==== Ottoman intervention ====
The decision by the Sublime Porte to pardon Mahmud stemmed from a desire to uphold the delicate equilibrium of power dynamics within the empire, preventing the concentration of authority in the hands of a single individual. In light of the growing influence of Ahmet Kurt Pasha following his triumph over the Bushatlis in 1775, the central administration prioritized Mahmud's elevation as a counterbalance, stripping Ahmet Kurt Pasha of titles and authority. However, Kara Mahmud's ascendance in subsequent years prompted the central government to seek his relocation away from Shkodra, a proposal met with vehement opposition from Kara Mahmud and the populace of Shkodra. Notably, the inhabitants of Shkodra, comprising various socio-economic strata, rallied behind Kara Mahmud due to his role as their representative and protector of their interests.

The palpable relief and endorsement of Kara Mahmud's reinstatement by the residents of Shkodra underscored the populace's acknowledgment of his pivotal role in safeguarding their well-being. Notably, even regional figures, such as the governor of Rumelia, and communities like those in Prizren, expressed support for Kara Mahmud's forgiveness, recognizing the stability and security his governance afforded. The subsequent reconfirmation of Mahmud as governor of Shkodra, alongside the appointment of Çavuşoğlu Mehmed to a distant district, exemplified the central administration's commitment to preserving a semblance of equilibrium among regional power brokers. Ultimately, the complex interplay of political maneuvering and regional dynamics elucidates the nuanced approach employed by the Ottoman central administration in managing internal tensions and preserving imperial stability during this period.

== Aftermath ==
The war turned in Kara Mahmud's favor when the Sublime Porte supported him, leading to the dismissal of Ahmet Kurt Pasha from his position in Berat. Afterward, Kara Mahmud successfully installed his previously exiled father-in-law as the Bey of Tirana, and restored the borders of 1775. However, his triumphs over Ahmet Kurt Pasha were short-lived. Two years later, the Ottoman Porte shifted its support to the Pashalik of Berat, only to change sides again during the ensuing civil wars between the two pashas in the following years.

== Sources ==
- Gjeli, Ardit (2018), BETWEEN REBELLION AND OBEDIENCE: THE RISE AND FALL OF BUSHATLI MAHMUD PASHA OF SHKODRA (1752-1796) (PDF), İstanbul Şehir University. PDF
- Jazexhi, Olsi (2018), Kara Mmahmud Pashë Bushati, Bualli i Shkodrës (1776–1796 ER/1190–1211 AH) (PDF), Dielli, archived (PDF) from the original on 2018-08-19
