= First Scutari–Berat War =

First Scutari-Berat War Lufta e Parë Shkodër-Berat
Date	1775
Location	Sanjak of Durrës
Result	Scutari victory
Territorial changes	Sanjak of Durrës is reannexed into the Pashalik of Scutari

Belligerents
Pashalik of Scutari	Pashalik of Berat; Pashalik of Yanina

Commanders and leaders
Mehmed Pasha Bushati; Mustafa Pasha I Kara Mahmud Pasha	Ahmet Kurt Pasha; Suleiman Pasha; Ali Pasha Tepelena

The First Scutari-Berat War (Albanian: Lufta e Parë Shkodër-Berat) was a military conflict between the Pashalik of Scutari under Mehmed Pasha Bushati against the Pashalik of Berat under Ahmet Kurt Pasha, who fought over the Sanjak of Durrës in 1775.

== Prelaude and War ==
=== Prelaude ===
In 1771, as a reward for his successful campaigns against Greek insurgents in the Orlov revolt during the Russo-Turkish war of 1768-1774, Mehmed Pasha Bushati would be given control over the Sanjaks of Durrës, Dukagjin, Elbasan and Ohrid. Thus placing the whole area under the absolute control of Pashalik of Scutari and the Bushati family. Upon ascending to the position of vizier, Mehmed Pasha Bushati turned a blind eye to the duties assigned by the Sublime Porte. Instead, he directed his energy toward consolidating his power. Mehmed Pasha's independent stance and actions posed a challenge to the authority of the Sublime Porte in the region. Moreover, while his son Kara Mahmud served in Silistre in 1774, the central government sent a letter to Mehmed Pasha, reminding him that the governance of Shkodra belonged to his son and that Mehmed Pasha should abdicate the post. Mehmed Pasha's reckless actions towards the central authority triggered a stern reaction. In response, the Ottomans intervened, transferring the Sanjak of Durrës from Mehmed Pasha to the notable Ahmet Kurt Pasha of the Pashalik of Berat. Recognizing the increased influence of the Bushatlis, the Sublime Porte sought to restore balance of power in the region, leading to a War between the two pashas.

=== War ===
Following this, Mehmed Pasha and his sons Mustafa and Kara Mahmud marched a large army into the Sanjak of Durrës and successfully led the troops against Kurt Ahmet Pasha in several battles. Ahmet Kurt Pasha garnered support from Ali Pasha Tepelena, Pasha of Yanina, who actively engaged in the war and fought Mehmed Pasha's armies near Kavajë and Tirana. The military defeat of Ahmet Kurt Pasha resulted in his withdrawal and the reannexation of the Sanjak of Durrës into the Pashalık of Scutari.

== Aftermath ==
Mehmed Pasha Bushati died shortly after the War in June 1775. Mustafa Pasha, eldest son of Mehmed Pasha and older brother of Kara Mahmud Pasha, would succeed his father and take control over the Pashalik of Scutari. Mustafa would launch an invasion into the Pashalik of Berat, marking the start of the Second Scutari-Berat War. However, he suffered a decisive defeat at the hands of Ahmet Kurt Pasha, leading to the annexation of a significant portion of the southern territories of the Pashalik of Scutari into Ahmet Kurt Pasha's realm and the loss of Scutari's access to the Adriatic Sea.

== Sources ==
- Gjeli, Ardit (2018), BETWEEN REBELLION AND OBEDIENCE: THE RISE AND FALL OF BUSHATLI MAHMUD PASHA OF SHKODRA (1752-1796) (PDF), İstanbul Şehir University, archived from the original (PDF) on 2024-03-01. PDF
- Hatibi, Dorian (2021), Historia e Durrësit – Nga prehistoria deri në vitin 1912 (in Albanian), vol. I, Botimet Jozef, ISBN 978-9928-317-97-1
