= First Scutari-Ottoman War =

War between the Albanian Pashalik of Scutari and the Ottoman Empire

First Scutari-Ottoman War Lufta e Parë Shkodrane-Osmane
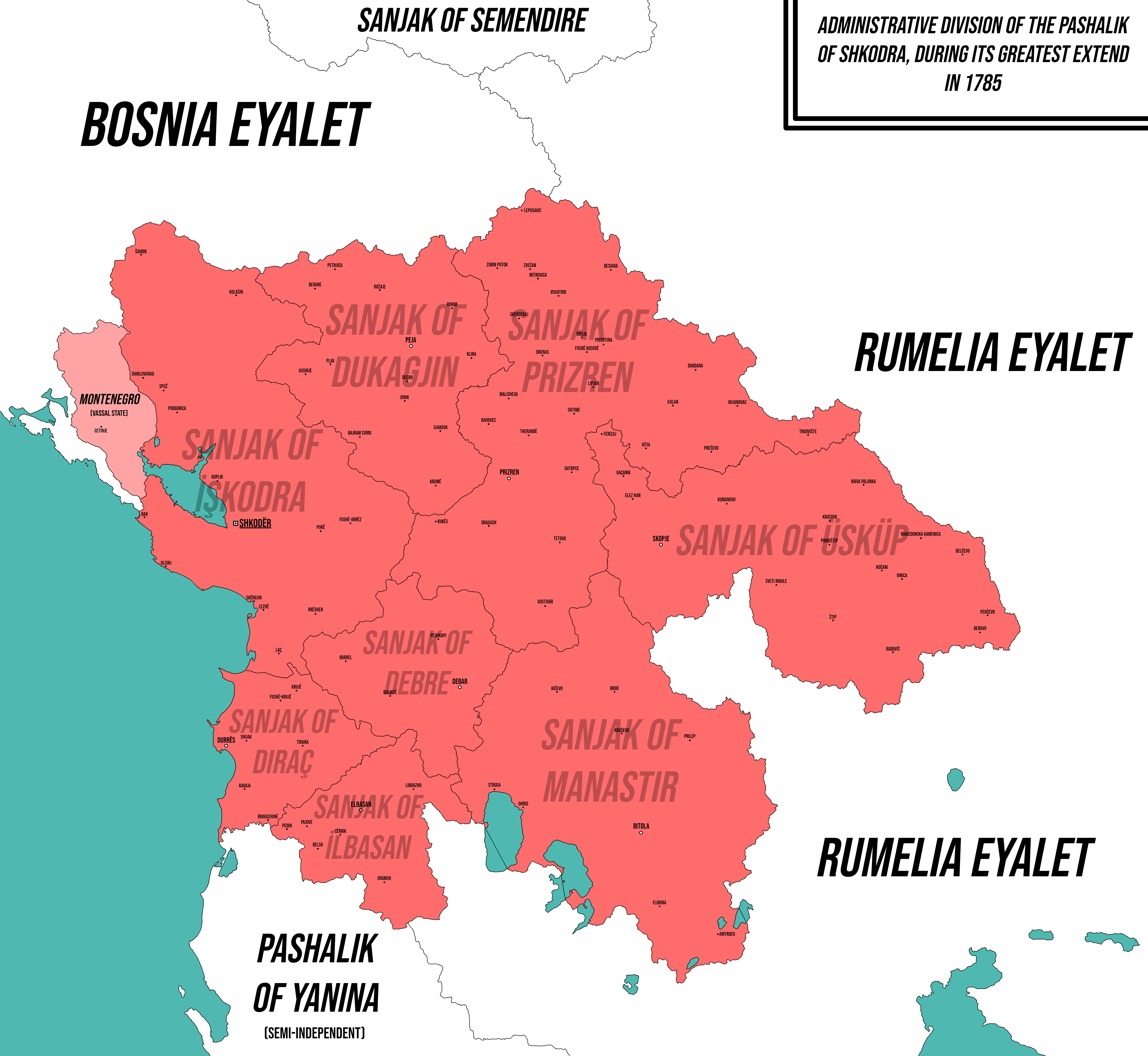
- Territory held by Kara Mahmud at the height of his power in 1785.
Date	1785–1789
Location	Pashalik of Scutari, Bosnia Eyalet and Rumelia Eyalet (modern-day Albania, Kosovo, Montenegro, Bosnia, Serbia, Greece and North Macedonia)
Result	Scutari victory
Territorial changes	Pashalik of Scutari loses large parts of its territories held outside of the Sanjak of Scutari.

Belligerents
Pashalik of Scutari Pashalik of Berat (switched to opposing side in 1787)	Ottoman Empire; Bosnia Eyalet; Rumelia Eyalet; Pashalik of Yanina; Pashalik of Berat; Toptani family; Ulcinj rebels; Montenegrin tribes; Nikšići; Rovčani; (Holy Roman Empire) Austrian Empire

Commanders and leaders
Kara Mahmud Pasha; Ahmed Pasha †	Abdülhamid I (d. 1789); Selim III; Çavuşoğlu Mehmed Pasha †; Aydoslu Mehmed Pasha; Selim Pasha †; Ali Pasha Tepelena; Cezayirli Gazi Hasan Pasha; Mehmed Pasha Qausholli †; Ahmet Kurt Pasha X Ibrahim Bey of Tirana (Holy Roman Empire) Emperor Joseph II (Holy Roman Empire) Filip Vukasović

Units involved
Shkodran Army; Hoti tribe Malsors	Ottoman Army

Strength
Unknown	Unknown

Casualties and losses
Unknown	Unknown

The First Scutari-Ottoman War (Albanian: Lufta e Parë Shkodrane-OsmaneTurkish: Birinci İşkodra-Osmanlı SavaşıBirinci İşkodra-Osmanlı Savaşı) was a conflict between Kara Mahmud Pasha, the Pasha of the de facto independent Pashalik of Scutari, and the Ottoman Empire. The war was caused by the expansionist policies of Kara Mahmud, which threatened the central government of the Ottoman Empire.

== Background ==
During potential Ottoman conflicts with Austria and Russia, Kara Mahmud rebelled against Ottoman authority, causing turmoil in the western territories. The governor of Shkodra reinforced his control, extending his influence even to Manastir. Reports indicate Mahmud challenged the governor of Rumelia and seized funds meant for Belgrade's Janissary troops. The dysfunctional Ottoman judiciary system and corruption among judges contributed to Kara Mahmud's rise. He presented himself as an authoritative figure to restore order, gaining support against disruptive notables. Kara Mahmud's interference in Bosnia, where he replaced officials with his puppets, created a crisis for the Sublime Porte. Alliance with the Pasha of Berat, Ahmed Kurt Pasha, expanded the influence of the Bushatlis. Despite the Ottoman government's desire to punish Mahmud, resource constraints and his autonomous rule hindered action. The passive stance continued until the end of 1785, prompting the Bushatlis to prepare for the impending confrontation.

== Timeline ==
=== Battle on the Kosovo field ===
In August 1785, the Sultan, alarmed by the growing power of Kara Mahmud and on account of his seditious activities, dismissed him from office as Mutasarrif and gave the order to the armies of the two Balkan eyalets (provinces) of Rumelia and of Bosnia, to march on Shkodër. The Rumelian Army first tried to penetrate to Shkodër through the Dibra region, where it was ambushed and forced to take another route through Kosovo. However, Kara Mahmud through his rapid movements, encountered the Rumelian army before it had time to join with that of Bosnia, and in the Battle he had with it at the Kosovo field, routed it entirely. The decisive defeat of the Rumelian armies persuaded the Wali of Bosnia to retreat without coming to any clash whatsoever with Kara Mahmud. After the Battle, during the period from April 1786 to March 1787, the Uprising of Kara Mahmud faced minimal resistance from both the opposing forces and the military contingents led by the viziers of Rumelia and Bosnia.

=== Kara Mahmud's attack on Montenegrins ===
==== Attack on Nikšić and Rovca ====
In 1786, Kara Mahmud Pasha attacked and defeated the Nikšići and Rovčani tribes, whom he blamed as traitors for their participation in the Attack on Montenegro in 1785. During the attack on Rovca, Kara Mahmud Pasha massacred 150 Montenegrin Serbs, after which he returned to Scutari. The attack on the Montenegrins and the subsequent massacre further escalated tensions between him and the Sublime Porte. The attack was a reason for the Ottoman armies being sent towards Scutari in 1787.

=== Kara Mahmud's offensive ===
==== Kara Mahmud's campaign in Macedonia and Kosovo ====
In May 1787, Kara Mahmud Pasha took the initiative in the battle against the Ottomans. He departed from Scutari with 6,000 soldiers. In Kosovo he first defeated and subdued the Pasha of Yakova. Afterwards, along with his brother Ahmet Pasha, he met the forces of Mehmed Pasha Çausholli near Manastir (Bitola), numbering 20,000 men, ultimately defeating them decisively in Battle. Subsequently, Ahmet Pasha launched an attack on the Vali of Rumelia in Skopje, emerging victorious and taking control of the city.

==== Kara Mahmud's campaign in Bosnia ====
Kara Mahmud's advancement through the Balkans reached its peak when his Armies besieged Sarajevo. In this case, the Sublime Porte declared him a rebel and ordered Mehmet Pasha Çausholli to replace him. However, the decision against him was put into effect in May 1787 when rumors in Istanbul suggested that the Pasha was planning to attack Edirne (Adrianople) with 25,000 soldiers. These rumors had significant impact in Istanbul, leading to calls for a jihad against the rebellious Pasha. The Shaykh al-Islām issued a fatwa declaring the Pasha a rebel, while Sultan Abdülhamid I sought his execution. Kara Mahmud's brother Ahmed Pasha effectively countered the Bosnian troops advancing from the north, achieving victory over them. However, in 27 August 1787, Kara Mahmud's operations in the Bosnia eyalet came to a halt when Ahmed Pasha was betrayed and decapitated by his own soldiers.

=== Ottoman Counteroffensive ===
==== Ali Pasha Tepelena's campaigns ====
Ali Pasha Tepelena, formerly aligned with the Bushatlis against Kurd Ahmed Pasha, emerged as a prominent figure in southern Albania and a formidable leader among the Tosks. Despite his involvement in numerous atrocities and village burnings, the Sublime Porte appointed him as the governor of Trikala, strategically leveraging his military prowess. This decision proved effective, as Ali Pasha Tepelena, demonstrated exceptional leadership, tipping the balance in favor of the central government.

Initially, he achieved a significant victory by breaking the defensive forces of the Bushatlis in Ohrid, notably beheading Kara Mahmud's cousin and sending his head to Istanbul. Subsequently, Ali Pasha Tepelena daringly intervened in Elbasan, quelling the resistance posed by Bushati's forces and securing central Albania for the Ottoman Empire. With the demise of Kurd Ahmed Pasha in 1787, while the war was still going on, Ali Pasha solidified his status as the most influential figure in southern Albania.

In recognition of his contributions to the campaign, the Sublime Porte extended unwavering support to Ali Pasha, assigning other commanders under his authority and providing substantial financial backing. His pivotal role in the campaign against Kara Mahmud likely played a crucial part in his subsequent ascent to become the preeminent power magnate in the region.

==== Revolt in Ulcinj ====
The Sublime Porte effectively crushed the resistance of the rebels in Shkodra. As they approached Mahmud's castle, the intervention of Cezayirli Gazi Hasan Pasha sparked an uprising in Ulcinj against the Bushatlis. Ultimately, the Shkodran garrison under the command of the fourteen-year-old nephew of Kara Mahmud, Mehmed Beg, would be defeated, and Mehmed Beg would be handed over to the Ottoman authorities.

==== Siege of Scutari (1787) ====
The Ottomans gathered 30,000 to 60,000 men under the command of Aydoslu Mehmed Pasha of Rumelia, Selim Pasha of Bosnia, and Ali Pasha of Yanina to besiege the Rozafa castle, where Kara Mahmud Pasha took refuge with 60 to 200 of his soldiers. During the siege, the defending Albanians attempted to break the siege by launching several attacks on the Ottoman armies that had surrounded the castle from all sides. Rozafa endured the bombardment by Turkish artillery for a staggering 80 days. However, on November 25, 1787, Kara Mahmud feigned submission, left the fortress with his loyal followers, and along the way, seized the imperial artillery, which was then turned against the Ottomans. His lurking army and his Malsor allies quickly gathered, ambushing the fleeing Pashas, resulting in a humiliating defeat for the Ottoman troops. Furthermore, all Turkish garrisons in Albania were individually attacked and defeated. Selim Pasha, the Wali of Bosnia, who had been on his way to retreat with 15,000 Bosniaks, was simultaneously dealt a significant blow by the Hoti tribe and was killed in battle. Mehmed Pasha Qausholli suffered a similar fate, when Shkodran Malsors, allied to Kara Mahmud, captured him in battle and decapitated him. Overall, the Ottomans lost around 6,000 men.

=== Aftermath of the Siege of Scutari ===
==== Economic blockade by the Ottomans ====
Following the victory of Kara Mahmud Pasha in the siege of Scutari, Kara Mahmud faced a challenging turn of events as the Sublime Porte perceived him as a threat. Consequently, they deemed it imperative to eliminate him at any cost. In December, the central government demanded the handover of the Bushatlis from the people of Scutari, threatening severe consequences if not complied with. While military force wasn't immediately employed in Shkodra, the Sublime Porte imposed an economic blockade on all commercial activities and issued arrest decrees for Shkodran merchants attempting trade in other regions. Mustafa Pasha of Toptanis, who was given the title of Pasha, became the executor of these measures, extending his control over central Albania.

==== Kara Mahmud's first Offensive in Central Albania and Montenegro ====
Faced with opposition from rival Albanian pashas, Kara Mahmud sought to neutralize internal threats in the Pashalik, preventing potential surprise attacks. His confrontation with the central government was viewed by some Muslims as a challenge to Sultan Abdülhamid's authority, and his close associates were discovered plotting the assassination of Kara Mahmud under the influence of the new Pasha of Bosnia, Mirialem Ebubekir Pasha. After eliminating the conspirators, Mahmud moved northward, where he executed the Pasha of Işbuzi for betrayal. Fearing retaliation from the Sublime Porte and a revolt from his own subjects, Mahmud fortified his castle with a substantial arsenal and sent his brother, Ibrahim Pasha, to break the blockade imposed by Mustafa Toptani. Despite Ibrahim's efforts with allies Kahraman Beg of Tirana and Mahmud Beg of Kavaje, Mustafa Pasha of Toptanis emerged victorious in all Battles. The allies of Kara Mahmud, sheltered in Durrës, awaited Kara Mahmud's assistance, but he remained cautious due to the precarious situation in Scutari. Despite hopes for an imperial pardon from Istanbul amid its wars with Austria and Russia, none was granted, and the influence of Kara Mahmud in central Albania waned.

==== Negotiations with the Austrians and Russians ====
Faced with the deteriorating situation, Kara Mahmud initiated negotiations with foreign powers, seeking support against the Ottomans. Both Russia and Austria expressed interest, with the Russians offering military assistance and naval support. The Austrians, closer geographically and with a Catholic presence in Scutari, proposed recognizing Mahmud as the "King of Albania" in exchange for opposing the Ottomans. Despite these tempting offers, Kara Mahmud remained passive, awaiting forgiveness from the Sublime Porte. Surrounded by enemies, including his rival Mustafa Pasha of Toptanis, Kara Mahmud aimed to make peace with the Ottomans. As a gesture of goodwill, he offered a gift to the Sultan: the heads of an Austrian delegation that had come to negotiate collaboration. This act, while serving as proof of Mahmud's loyalty to the Sultan, also aimed to regain the trust of his Muslim subjects.

==== Kara Mahmud's second Offensive in Central Albania and Montenegro ====
This strategic move played a crucial role in pacifying the Muslim population in Scutari, which had been supportive during the siege. With newfound support, Kara Mahmud, along with his allies, marched into central Albania and managed to defeat Mustafa Pasha of the Toptanis. Subsequently, Kara Mahmud marched north towards Ulcinj and punished his former allies, burning down their palaces in Tivar (Bar) and leaving his supporters in charge.

=== Austrian interference ===
During Kara Mahmud Pasha's struggle against the Ottomans, the Austrian Empire sought to liberate the Balkans from Ottoman rule. Emperor Joseph II thought to himself that he could recruit Kara Mahmud to his side. On April 29, 1788, Emperor Joseph II had received a letter from the Kara Mahmud, who expressed his willingness to defect. The Austrians also appointed a spy named De Bronjar to negotiate with Kara Mahmud from April to June 1788. During his final visit on June 15, 1788, De Bronjar, along with his three companions, had several days of heated conversations with the Kara Mahmud. They threatened him, demanding that he open Scutari to their army under Filip Vukasović; otherwise, they would bombard the city. However, Kara Mahmud, offended by the Austrian threats, executed De Bronjar and the spies who were with him on June 20, 1788, after taking the delegation to the village of Muriq outside Shkodra. He threw their bodies into a pit, while their heads, as proof of his loyalty to the Sultan, were sent to Istanbul.

==== Campaigns of Filip Vukasović ====
After the executions of the Austrian Austrians then sent Filip Vukasović, a Croatian, along with about 400 soldiers to aid the Montenegrins in a revolt against the Ottomans. In July, he, together with Mihailo Plamenac and Serdar Đurašković, attacked the Žabljak fortress and set it ablaze. Later, Filip Vukasović, with 400 Austrians and 2,000 Montenegrins, besieged Spuž, also setting it on fire. During the siege of Spuž, Kara Mahmud Pasha came to aid the besieged fortress and defeated the Austro-Montenegrin forces. When the Montenegrins realized that Vukasović's battalion, which had dwindled to 117 men, was not the vanguard of a large force, they sided with Kara Mahmud. The hostile attitude of the population was further intensified by the realization that Vukasović's small unit would not bring the hoped-for liberation from the Ottomans. During his sudden departure from Cetinje, Vukasović managed to take 60 Montenegrins as hostages for his safety, using them as human shields in the valley of Njegošće to protect his troops as he continued his march back to Austria.

=== Imperial Pardon from the Sultan and the end of the War ===
The Sublime Porte learned of events in its western provinces through reports from an English ambassador detailing Kara Mahmud's negotiations with the Austrians. The ambassador noted the killing of Austrian emissaries after talks and the potential revolt involving Austrian soldiers joining the Montenegrins. However, Kara Mahmud's swift military intervention prevented the spread of Austrian influence, safeguarding not only his district but also the territorial integrity of the Ottoman Empire. Despite his efforts, the Sublime Porte did not grant Kara Mahmud forgiveness for his political shift, a stance maintained until Selim III ascended the throne. The Ottomans, struggling in the war against two empires, faced defeats exacerbated by conflicts with provincial magnates like Kara Mahmud. The Sublime Porte expended resources to eliminate defiant notables, contributing to the challenges in fighting European powers.

Governor Abdi Pasha of Rumelia sought Kara Mahmud's pardon in exchange for his services on the front, recommending him for appointment to the Belgrade or Bosnian front. Cezayirli Gazi Hasan Pasha also negotiated with Kara Mahmud, acting as guarantors for his loyalty. Despite the Ottomans' desperate circumstances, Mahmud was not officially forgiven, but commanders appealed to appoint him as governor of Bosnia, emphasizing the severity of the situation. In response to appeals, Sultan Selim III offered forgiveness in exchange for Kara Mahmud's loyalty and participation on the Bosnian front with 20,000 soldiers. Mahmud received his pardon on 14 August 1789, brought by his nephew and Mahmud Beg of Kavaja.

== Aftermath ==
With the imperial pardon from the Sublime Porte, Kara Mahmud joined the war against the Austrians on the Ottoman side and quickly mobilized a large army. He was appointed the Commander of Yeni Pazar and marched towards Kosovo, intending to gather more soldiers needed against the Austrians. In Bosnia, he was ordered by Governor Mehmed Pasha to move to Izvornik. Despite initial successes against the Austrians, harsh conditions forced Kara Mahmud to retreat to Scutari. On his way back to Scutari, Kara Mahmud Pasha, accompanied by 9,000 soldiers, decided to cross through the Nikšići territory, which he had attacked and defeated three years prior. During his crossing, he was ambushed by local Nikšići tribesmen, who managed to repulse him, after which he took another route to Scutari.

== Sources ==
- Gjeli, Ardit (2018), BETWEEN REBELLION AND OBEDIENCE: THE RISE AND FALL OF BUSHATLI MAHMUD PASHA OF SHKODRA (1752-1796) (PDF), İstanbul Şehir University, archived from the original (PDF) on 2024-03-01. PDF
- Jazexhi, Olsi (2018), Kara Mahmud Pashë Bushati, Bualli i Shkodrës (1776–1796 ER/1190–1211 AH) (PDF), Dielli, archived (PDF) from the original on 2018-08-19
