= Second Scutari-Ottoman War =

Conflict between the Pashalik of Scutari and the Ottoman Empire

Second Scutari-Ottoman War Lufta e Dytë Shkodrane-Osmane
- Part of History of Albania and Ottoman wars in Europe
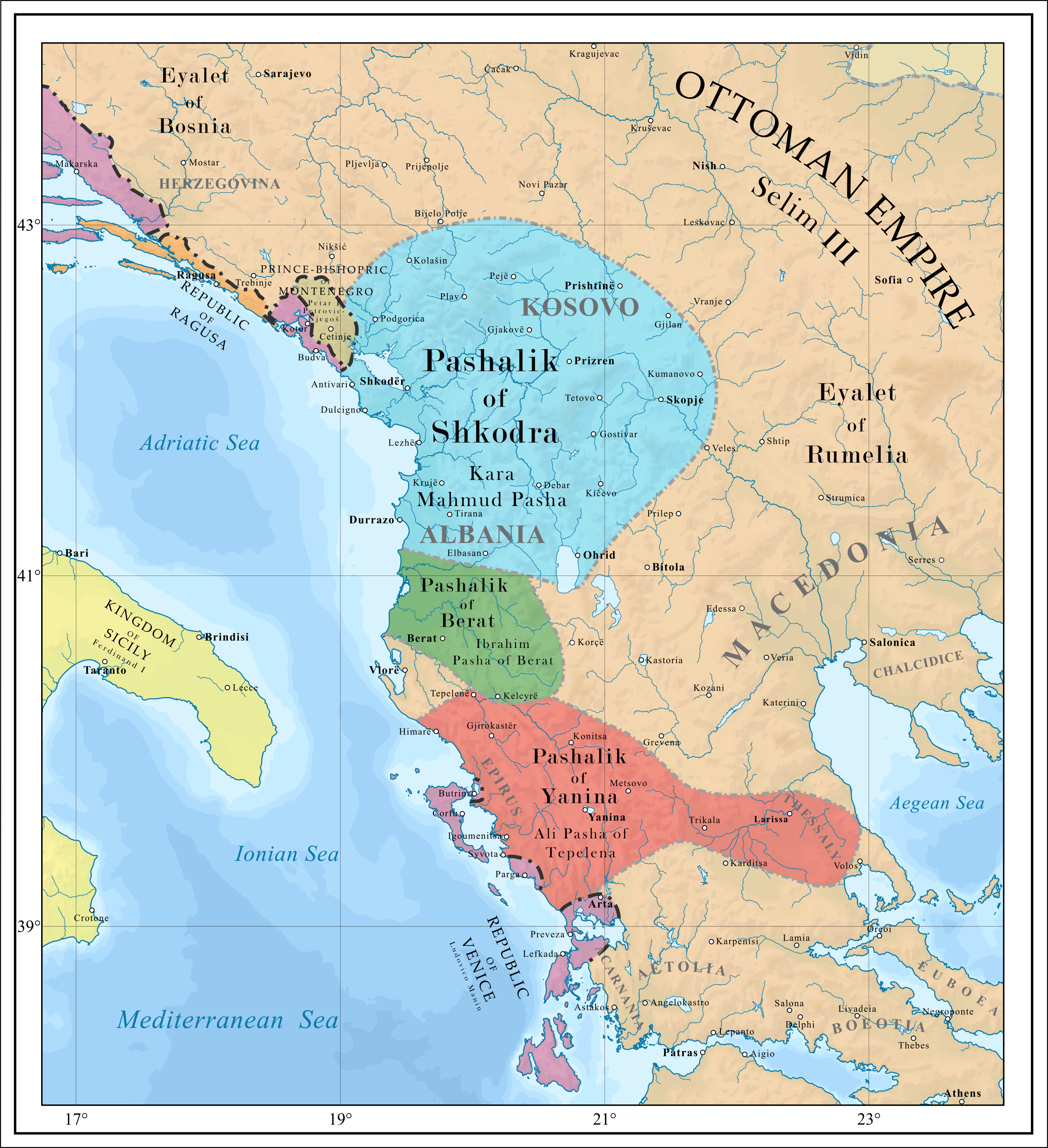
- Albanian pashaliks in 1790–1795. The Pashalik of Shkodra is colored in blue.
Date	1791–1795
Location	Balkan
Result	Scutari victory
Territorial changes	Sanjaks of Skopje, Dukagjin, Prizren, Pristina, Elbasan, and Ohrid annexed by the Pashalik of Scutari

Belligerents
Pashalik of Scutari; Pashalik of Vidin	Ottoman Empire; Pashalik of Yanina; Pashalik of Berat; Bushati family

Commanders and leaders
Kara Mahmud Pasha; Osman Pazvantoğlu	Selim III; Ebu Bekir Pasha; Ali Pasha Tepelena; Ibrahim Pasha of Berat; Jafer Pasha of Skopje; Mustafa Pasha of Kruja; Mehmet Pasha of Elbasan; Ibrahim Pasha Bushati

Strength
25,000 men	30,000–40,000 men

Casualties and losses
Unknown	Unknown

The Second Scutari-Ottoman War (Albanian:Lufta e Dytë e Shkodrane-Osmane; Turkish:İkinci İşkodra-Osmanlı Savaşı) was a war fought in 1795 between the Ottoman Empire and the Pashalik of Scutari.

== Background ==
After the conclusion of the war with Russia and the war with Austria, Sultan Selim III became acutely aware of the internal challenges facing the Ottoman Empire, among which was the issue of powerful regional magnates, such as Kara Mahmud of Shkodra, who also held the title of Vizier. Despite his involvement in the war against the Russians, Kara Mahmud was regarded as a potential threat by the Sublime Porte, capable of undermining central authority when the opportunity arose.

== War ==
=== Kara Mahmud's first campaign ===
==== Campaign in Vidin ====
Before the end of the war against the Russians, particularly after his deployment to Vidin in 1791, where, as a vizier commanding a large army consisting of 25,000 men, Kara Mahmud demonstrated a willingness to act independently of the central authority. Kara Mahmud helped Osman Pazvantoğlu, a Bosnian ayan who had spent much of his life in Albania, to take over Vidin and create his own semi independent state.

==== Return to Shkodra ====
Upon his return from Vidin to Shkodra in late 1791, Kara Mahmud committed numerous atrocities, misappropriated funds allocated for military campaigns, and began to reassert his control over the Pashalik of Shkodra. He eliminated rivals and replaced them with allies or family members, effectively restoring the Pashalik to its former strength. The Sublime Porte was informed of Mahmud's actions by Abdullah Efendi, the provincial treasurer who accompanied him on his travels and witnessed the destruction caused by Kara Mahmud and his forces. Kara Mahmud also turned his attention to commerce, obstructing Venetian activities and supporting the Dulcignote fleet, which operated on his behalf. He imposed additional taxes on tobacco, violating the capitulations granted by the Sublime Porte to foreign merchants in the ports under his control. Aware of Kara Mahmud's challenge to its authority, the Sublime Porte resolved to eliminate him after the war, seeing his removal as necessary to safeguard the empire’s stability. However, Kara Mahmud, through his agent in Istanbul, Teberdar Ali, was forewarned of the central government's intentions, allowing him to prepare for the impending confrontation.

==== Campaigns in Albania, Kosovo and Macedonia ====
The emergence of Jelali and Kırçalı bands, formed by veterans of the war, led the Kara Mahmud Pasha to intervene militarily to restore order in the Gegalık. He subdued many pashas, beys, and rebels in central Albania, conquering and bringing the Sanjaks of Skopje, Dukagjin, Prizren, Pristina, and Ohrid under his control. Kara Mahmud's actions provoked discontent among the Muslim population of Shkodra, who feared collective punishment from the Sublime Porte. Even his own brother, Ibrahim Pasha, chose to distance himself from Mahmud and aligned with the Sublime Porte. The Sublime Porte then sought to unify southern Albanian notables against Mahmud, securing the loyalty of both Ibrahim Pasha and Mahmud’s nephew, Mustafa Bushati. Additionally, the Porte sought to forge an alliance between Ali Pasha of Tepelena, aiming to consolidate support for a campaign against Kara Mahmud. As a result, the Sublime Porte removed the [Kara Mahmud from his position and replaced him with his brother, Ibrahim Pasha. Ebu Bekir Pasha of Belgrade, who was also the Beylerbey of Rumelia at the time, was tasked with removing the Pasha from office. In this campaign, Ebu Bekir was aided by Ali Pasha Tepelena, Ibrahim Pasha of Berat, Jafer Pasha of Skopje, Mustafa Pasha of Kruja, Mehmet Pasha of Elbasan, and Kara Mahmud's brother, Ibrahim Pasha. A 30,000-40,000-strong army marched against him once again.

=== Ottoman campaign ===
==== Siege of Shkodra (1793) ====
The Sublime Porte imposed an economic blockade on Shkodra, aiming to cripple Kara Mahmud's resources. With the support of various Albanian pashas, Ebu Bekir Pasha advanced on Shkodra. Kara Mahmud retreated to the fortress of Rozafa with 500 of his loyal men while Ottoman forces besieged Shkodra on 20 August 1793. Ebu Bekir Pasha requisitioned seven hundred houses in Shkodra for military use and took forty hostages, imprisoning them in Vlora in an attempt to pressure the local population. However, these measures failed to weaken Kara Mahmud's position. The Ottoman forces persecution of Catholic inhabitants led them to rally behind Kara Mahmud, who, in contrast, showed tolerance and defended their rights. Kara Mahmud withstood the Ottoman siege for three months. On November 30, 1793, Kara Mahmud launched a successful sortie, defeating the besieging forces. The intervention of Catholic Highlanders from Lezha contributed to the retreat of the imperial army, which withdrew first to Elbasan and then to Ohrid, where they joined forces with Ali Pasha of Tepelena.

==== Ali Pasha's campaign ====
Ali Pasha Tepelena, who had his own ambitions for expansion in Albania and had been the most loyal Pasha of the Sublime Porte in Albania since 1792, made the greatest contribution against Kara Mahmud. In the summer of 1793, leading a large Albanian army, Ali Pasha marched against Korçë and Ohrid, which had previously been under Kara Mahmud's jurisdiction. Aiming to eliminate the threat of Kara Mahmud in Toskeria, he made his conquests with lightning speed. For this, the Sultan rewarded him with the title Aslan (Lion). With his sons, he had managed to suppress every Pro-Shkodran uprising in southern Albania and Macedonia, and for this, the Sublime Porte rewarded him with the title of mir-i miran, while his son, Muhtar Pasha, was given the Sanjak of Ohrid in 1794, which had previously belonged to Ibrahim Bushati.

=== Kara Mahmud's second campaign ===
==== Reconquest of Southern Albania ====
After the siege of Shkodra and the campaigns of Ali Pasha, Kara Mahmud launched a second campaign to reconquer parts of southern Albania. In the fall of 1794, he attacked and retook the Sanjak of Elbasan and the Sanjak of Ohrid. The locals in Elbasan resisted Kara Mahmud, but they were massacred afterward. After the campaign in southern Albania, Kara Mahmud returned to Shkodër.

=== End of the War and last campaigns in Kosovo and Dibra ===
Kara Mahmud, not wanting to antagonize the Sublime Porte again, wrote to them a letter in early 1794 about his victory and sought their forgiveness and understanding for his campaigns. In his letter to the Sultan, he assured him of his loyalty. The Sublime Porte responded to the rebel Pasha's request by asking him to explain the matter to the Sheikh-ul-Islam, and the Grand Vizier. One of the conditions set by the Ottoman Divan for pardoning the Pasha was that he guarantee not to attack other pashas in the future, return the properties he had forcibly taken from beys and pashas, and become a supporter of the implementation of the "Nizam-i Cedid" in his Pashalik. Kara Mahmud accepted the Sublime Porte's offer, and a year later, on March 10, 1795, he officially resumed his posts and titles in Scutari. The pashas of Gjakova, Pristina, and Kruja also became his vassals right after.

==== Battle of Prizren ====
Despite his promises, Kara Mahmud attacked Prizren in Kosovo in 1795, targeting Tahir Pasha Rrotullari, who had ousted his nephew, Mehmet Pasha. Entering Prizren at the head of many troops from Shkodra and central Albania in September 1795, he engaged in a bloody battle in the city, crushing the Kosovar resistance and installing his nephew as the mutasarrif. His victory was so impressive that the Catholic bishop of Prizren, compared him to the biblical Maccabees or Skanderbeg. Kara Mahmud then led a campaign of plunder, devastation, and massacre against the local inhabitants all across Kosovo.

==== Battle of Dibra ====
Yusuf Beg, likely encouraged by Ali Pasha of Tepelena, ousted the previous ruler of Dibra, who had been an ally of the Bushatlis. This act provoked Kara Mahmud to swiftly retaliate. Despite Kara Mahmud's eventual defeat, likely due to the region's mountainous terrain and reinforcements from Ali Pasha, the Bushatlis succeeded in bringing the troublesome region under their control by negotiating an agreement with Yusuf Beg, ultimately converting him into an ally and reannexing Dibra into the Pashalik.

== See also ==
- Pashalik of Scutari
- Ottoman Empire
- Selim III
- History of Albania
- Shkodër

== Sources ==
- Gjeli, Ardit (2018), BETWEEN REBELLION AND OBEDIENCE: THE RISE AND FALL OF BUSHATLI MAHMUD PASHA OF SHKODRA (1752-1796) (PDF), İstanbul Şehir University, archived from the original (PDF) on 2024-03-01. PDF
- Jazexhi, Olsi (2018), Kara Mahmud Pashë Bushati, Bualli i Shkodrës (1776–1796 ER/1190–1211 AH) (PDF), Dielli, archived (PDF) from the original on 2018-08-19
