= Scutari–Berat War =

Scutari–Berat War may refer to:

- First Scutari–Berat War
- Second Scutari-Berat War
- Third Scutari-Berat War
- Fourth Scutari-Berat War
