= Fourth Scutari-Berat War =

Fourth war between Scutari and Berat

Fourth Scutari-Berat War Lufta e Katërt Shkodër-Berat
Date	July–December 1785
Location	Pashalik of Berat, Ottoman Empire
Result	Scutari victory
Territorial changes	Sanjak of Elbasan annexed by Scutari

Belligerents
Pashalik of Scutari; Pashalik of Yanina	Pashalik of Berat

Commanders and leaders
Kara Mahmud Pasha; Ali Pasha Tepelena	Ahmet Kurt Pasha

Strength
Unknown	15,000 men

The Fourth Scutari-Berat War (Albanian: Lufta e Katërt Shkodër-Berat) was a military conflict between the Pashalik of Scutari under Kara Mahmud Pasha and the Pashalik of Berat under Ahmet Kurt Pasha, both Ottoman vassals. The conflict marked the final direct war between the two realms, culminating in a decisive victory for the forces of Kara Mahmud Pasha.

== Background ==
In mid 1785, Kara Mahmud invaded Montenegro and managed to subdue the Montnengrins. Following his triumph in the Montenegro invasion, Kara Mahmud began receiving tribute from the Montenegrins. Immediately after subduing Montenegro, Kara Mahmud Pasha turned his attention towards Elbasan and Berat, as the long-time enemy of the Bushatlis, Ahmet Kurt Pasha, seizing the opportunity of Kara Mahmud's absence in Montenegro, persuaded Sulejman Bey Verlaci, the Pasha of Elbasan and a former puppet of Kara Mahmud, who had been married to his sister, to divorce her and join his side. He also closed the ports to the people of Ulcinj.

In a letter from July 27, 1785, written by an Albanian to a friend in Pera, sent by the bailiff of Venice, where it is mentioned that sailors from Ulcinj, having visited Montenegro, witnessed how the Bosnian Aga of Trebinje had kissed the feet of Kara Mahmud Pasha of Scutari, with the intent of joining the Pashas journey to Herceg Novi and Ragusa. According to the witness, the Pasha had answered that he could not proceed with the travel after having sworn a truce to the inhabitants of Trebinje and Bosina. It is also mentioned that the Pasha had stopped all ships from leaving Ulcinj after Eid, since he was planning to attack Ahmet Kurt Pasha of Berat, continuing to Valona, in order to reach Morea.

=== Funding of separatists and Scutari-Yanina alliance ===
Ahmet Kurt Pasha’s influence in the Sanjak of Berat had significantly diminished, and even the local population no longer viewed him as the powerful figure who had once defeated the Bushatlis in 1775. A separatist faction in Berat, backed by Kara Mahmud and his sympathizers, began weakening the district from within, planning to strike it from the outside. Prior to the war, Kara Mahmud Pasha also secured an alliance with Ali Pasha Tepelena of the Pashalik of Yanina, who had been appointed governor of Delvinë and sought vengeance on Ahmet Kurt Pasha. Ali Pasha Tepelena also saw Kara Mahmud as the ally who could support his ambitions.

== War ==
=== Campaign in Elbasan ===
Kara Mahmud began his campaign in Elbasan in late July. Sensing the growing threat, Ahmet Kurt Pasha mobilized around 15,000 troops to counter the offensive. Before arriving in Berat, Kara Mahmud first sought to neutralize Ahmet Kurt Pasha's allies. The campaign launched by Kara Mahmud Pasha together with Ali Pasha Tepelena against Elbasan and Berat went well. He besieged the Peqin Castle, however didn't wait for its surrender and immediately marched to attack Elbasan. Frightened by Kara Mahmud's march, Sulejman Bey Verlaci of Elbasan agreed to remarry Kara Mahmud's sister and settled the dispute without conflict. As a result, Ahmet Kurt Pasha was left to face the attacks of both Kara Mahmud and Ali Pasha Tepelena alone. By mid-August, Kara Mahmud and Ali Pasha Tepelena had managed to take control of the Sanjak of Elbasan, as well as the entire southeastern part of the Pashalik of Berat.

=== Battle of Peqin ===
Following the successes, Kara Mahmud restored order in the region and then turned his forces toward Berat. Soon, a contingent of the Shkodran army advanced into Myzeqe, securing the region for Kara Mahmud. On October 1, 1785, Kara Mahmud, leading a large army, neutralized the notables of Korçë and set up camp near the town, awaiting a confrontation with Ahmet Kurt Pasha near Peqin. Despite some resistance, a contingent of the Shkodran army yet again besieged the castle of Peqin. Realizing the strategic importance of Peqin, Ahmet Kurt Pasha left Berat with his army to relieve the besieged castle. However, Kara Mahmud, advancing quickly from the south, intercepted Ahmet Kurt Pasha’s army before it reached Peqin and dealt him a decisive defeat in Battle. From that moment, the Kara Mahmud earned the title “Kara,” becoming famous even among the Tosks of southern Albania for his victory against Ahmet Kurt Pasha.

=== Ottoman Intervention ===
However, Kara Mahmud’s and Ali Pasha’s campaign against the Pashalik of Berat did not succeed in overthrowing Ahmet Kurt Pasha. With the intervention of the Republic of Venice at the Ottoman Porte, Ahmet Kurt Pasha managed to convince the Ottomans to send Cezayirli Gazi Hasan Pasha to request that Kara Mahmud put an end to the bloodshed among Muslims. Even after this request, Kara Mahmud continued to besiege the Peqin Castle and took it control of it in December 1785. There, he installed his nephew, Mahmud Bey, as the kullukçibash (commander of the fortress), and then returned to Shkodër to marry his fifth wife, the daughter of Kahreman Pasha of Peja.

== Aftermath ==
The war entered Albanian folklore, particularly among the Ghegs. Following Kara Mahmud's decisive victory, the Ghegs composed a song mocking their Tosk Albanian neighbors to the south. The song goes as follows:

When Kara Mahmud Pasha of Shkodër marched against Kurt Pasha of Berat in 1785, the Ghegs composed this song, clearly expressing their disdain for the Tosks:

"Beat, hearts, beat, for we have defeated the Tosks. Shkodër, the warlike, has measured itself against the heroes of Rumelia.

They said to Mollâ Husein*: The tabak-makers and tailors have set off; the Tosks have clashed with the Ghegs; they want a song to immortalize this event.

Kurt Pasha is in Berat; may he not be taken away. What rank does he hold next to our lord, Mahmud Pasha? Why does he dare to challenge him?

Kurt Pasha is a 'verlasi' (scoundrel, vagabond, here akin to the German 'swine'): he wages war against his master. But he will tremble with fear when, three hours beyond the Semani, he hears the sound of his tambourines*.

At this noise, Kurt Pasha fled to the Tekke, leaving behind his honor. He tears at his beard and hair, and in fear of his impending fate, he faints.

Mahmud Pasha mounts his steed. He strides ahead of his troops, shouting: Forward, forward, today, inshAllah, I will personally kill Kurt Pasha of Berat.

Wherever he goes, this roaring lion, God has granted him the gift of spreading terror among his enemies. He attacks the Tekke of Baba Hasan in Peqin. The baggage, the weapons—all become his loot.

Deli and you, poor Tahir, you sought refuge in a mill, defending yourself with courage. But what can you do against this devouring vulture? Death awaits you! Your Tosks, riddled with bullets, show their swiftness in running away. Long will they remember the bravery of the Ghegs.

Aga Rufa* calls out to them: O Tosks, why do you flee like women? What use are the sabers you carry at your side? Gather, spread out as skirmishers, bravely attack your enemies; cut off their heads with your yatagans. Better to die a thousand times than live dishonored!

They do not hear his voice; they flee in disarray. Go, O Tosks of Berat, put on your opankas and approach the Shkodrans again. For these men do not know how to flee but can shoot from afar with their long rifles."

---

- Mollâ Husein – likely a commander or significant figure
- Tambourines – probably referring to war drums
- Aga Rufa – another commander or figure

Mulla Hysen Dobraçi, a poet from Shkodra who served in the Bushatli court, composed a beyte (poem) celebrating Kara Mahmud's victory over the forces of Ahmet Kurt Pasha near Berat.

== Sources ==
- Gjeli, Ardit (2018), BETWEEN REBELLION AND OBEDIENCE: THE RISE AND FALL OF BUSHATLI MAHMUD PASHA OF SHKODRA (1752-1796) (PDF), İstanbul Şehir University. PDF
- Jazexhi, Olsi (2018), Kara Mmahmud Pashë Bushati, Bualli i Shkodrës (1776–1796 ER/1190–1211 AH) (PDF), Dielli, archived (PDF) from the original on 2018-08-19
