= Second Scutari-Berat War =

Second Scutari-Berat War Lufta e Dytë Shkodër-Berat
Date	1775–1776
Location	Sanjak of Elbasan, Sanjak of Durrës
Result	Berat victory, see aftermath
Territorial changes	Sanjaks of Durrës are annexed by Ahmet Kurt Pasha into the Pashalik of Berat

Belligerents
Pashalik of Scutari; Bajrak of Mirdita	Pashalik of Berat; Support: Ottoman Empire Pashalik of Spuž; Zadrima rebels

Commanders and leaders
Mustafa Pasha I Kara Mahmud Pasha; Gjon Marku of Mirdita †	Ahmet Kurt Pasha; Support: Köstendil Mehmed Pasha Ibrahim Pasha of Spuž

The Second Scutari-Berat War (Albanian: Lufta e Dytë Shkodër-Berat) was a military invasion launched by Mustafa Pasha of the Pashalik of Scutari against the Pashalik of Berat under Ahmet Kurt Pasha.

== Prelude ==
Fresh challenges emerged in the Pashalik of Scutari with the passing of Mehmed Pasha on July 14, 1775. Quick to capitalize on this opportunity, the Sublime Porte promptly appointed Köstendil Mehmed Pasha as the new vizier in Scutari. Upon his arrival, the new vizier encountered opposition from local leaders, including the Bushati family. Although the official governorship of Scutari belonged to Kara Mahmud, Albanian customs dictated that the eldest child of the family had the right to assume leadership. Consequently, authority in the Pashalik then rested with Mustafa Pasha. Additionally, the new vizier found himself stripped of any influence, as all allies of the Bushati household had pledged their allegiance exclusively to Mustafa Pasha.

In these circumstances, Cezayirli Gazi Hasan Pasha intervened to negotiate with Kara Mahmud and Mustafa Pasha. While his presence may have been influenced by his close ties to Kara Mahmud, he ultimately decided to support Mustafa in becoming the Pasha of Scutari. Recognizing the significance of tax-farming in the Sanjak of Durrës for the merchants of Shkodra and the Pasha of Scutari itself, Mustafa Pasha initiated preparations for war against Ahmet Kurt Pasha, who again had infiltrated the Sanjak with 14,000 soldiers, after capitalizing on the difficult situation in Scutari.

== War ==
=== Battle at Peqin ===
Preparations for the conflict with Ahmet Kurt Pasha were initiated by Mustafa Pasha. Amassing an army of approximately 14,000 soldiers, he also enlisted the support of his vassal, Gjon Marku of the Bajrak of Mirdita. Together, they marched into Central Albania, invading the Pashalik of Berat, to confront the forces led by Ahmet Kurt Pasha of the Pashalik of Berat.

On September 13, 1775, the two armies clashed near the city of Peqin. The outcome was a decisive defeat for the forces of Scutari, resulting in a disaster that claimed over 4,000 lives on Scutari's side. Gjon Marku, the Kapedan of Mirdita and leader of the Mirditor forces, also was killed in action, after he managed to capture the city and the castle of Peqin.

The consequences of the battle were severe for the Pashalik of Scutari, leading to the loss of the crucial Sanjak of Durrës. The sanjak was subsequently annexed by the Pashalik of Berat, causing the simultaneous loss of access to the Adriatic Sea.

=== Revolt in Zadrima and Spuž ===
Following the decisive defeat in the battle, Mustafa Pasha initiated a more cooperative relationship with the Ottomans. The primary motive behind this was to get an Imperial pardon, postpone military action by the Ottomans and to secure support from them for another campaign against Ahmet Kurt Pasha. While Mustafa Pasha managed to postpone repercussions from the Sublime Porte, the same leniency did not extend to other regional notables. A month after the defeat at Peqin, tribal leaders in Zadrima joined forces with Ahmet Kurt Pasha against the Bushatis. In this encounter, however, the Bushatis emerged victorious, successfully thwarting the coalition of local tribal leaders in the vicinity.

Additionally, a rebellion led by the Pasha of Spuž in the northern part of the Pashalik posed a direct threat to Scutari, Mustafa Pasha's brother, Kara Mahmud failed to suppress Ibrahim Pasha and had to return to Scutari defeated, thus further complicating the situation for the Pashalik.

=== Imperial pardon ===
In a bid for a pardon from the Sublime Porte, Mustafa Pasha dispatched ambassadors to Istanbul with orders to spare no expense. Subsequently, the Ottomans opted to form an alliance with Ahmet Kurt Pasha, who, in less than two years, had dismantled the Pashalik of Scutari. As an army under the command of Köstendil Mehmed Pasha prepared to attack Lezhë (Leş), an envoy arrived, presenting an imperial decree pardoning the Bushatis. In return, the Sublime Porte required the Bushatis to make a payment of around two thousand sacks of money, a substantial sum that, given their precarious situation, they deemed worthy of expenditure.

== Aftermath ==
The loss of the Sanjak of Durrës had a terrible impact on the economy of the Pashalik of Scutari, as it deprived the city's merchants of access to the Adriatic sea. After receiving forgiveness, Mustafa Pasha continued as Scutari's governor until at least 1778. He later assisted the Ottoman army in Morea, ruling there for two years. Mustafa eventually became governor of the Sanjak of Delvina in southern Albania. While details about his fate vary, some sources claim he was killed by bandits in Delvinë. Despite remaining the governor of Scutari until 1784, Kara Mahmud took on the de facto rule, addressing the challenges in the Pashalik caused by Mustafa Pasha's failures, bringing it to the brink of disintegration in less than two years.

== Sources ==
- Gjeli, Ardit (2018), BETWEEN REBELLION AND OBEDIENCE: THE RISE AND FALL OF BUSHATLI MAHMUD PASHA OF SHKODRA (1752-1796) (PDF), İstanbul Şehir University, archived from the original (PDF) on 2024-03-01. PDF
