= Sanjak of Durrës =

Sanjak of the Ottoman Empire

Sanjak of Durrës سنجاق دراج Sanxhaku i Durrësit
- Sanjak of the Ottoman Empire
- Sanjak of Durrës highlighted in darker green within the Scutari vilayet in late 19th century.
- Capital: Durrës
  - Type: Empire
- Political subdivisions: Vilayet of Scutari
- Today part of: Albania

The Sanjak of Durrës (Ottoman Turkish: سنجاق دراج, Sancağı-i Dıraç or Draç, or لواء دراج, Livâ-i Dıraç or Draç; Albanian: Sanxhaku i Durrësit) was one of the sanjaks of the Ottoman Empire. It was named for its capital Durrës and was also known as the Sanjak of Durazzo from its capital's Italian name. The sanjak was composed of the kazas of Durrës, Tirana, Shijak, Kavajë, and Krujë. The Sanjak of Durrës formed the southern half of the Vilayet of Scutari. The northern half was the Sanjak of Scutari. Durrës Sanjak also bordered the sanjaks of Manastir and Dibra to its northeast and the sanjak of Elbasan to the east and south. Its western border was the Adriatic Sea. Its terrain is generally flat and plain. Only the eastern parts of the kazas of Tirana and Kavajë were mountainous.

The fortress of Durrës would be among the last castles in Albanian territory to fall into the hands of the Ottomans in the middle of 1501 and the city itself emerged highly devastated by the numerous clashes over the previous century. Under Ottoman rule, the city would never regain the former prosperity it had enjoyed since antiquity. A partial revival in terms of economic and strategic importance is recorded during the period of the autonomous and de facto independent Albanian-ruled Pashalik of Scutari.

Durrës would be established as a sanjak only in 1880 after a reform that followed the Russo-Turkish War and the Congress of Berlin. As a sanjak, it would be under the jurisdiction of the Scutari vilayet. As a third level administrative body, it would initially have four kazas since Krujë would be transferred to the Sanjak of Durrës jurisdiction only in 1903.

After the Young Turk Revolution of July 1908 which restored in force the liberal constitution of 1876 and the re-establishment of the parliament which had been in force for only two years (1876-1878), the Sanjak of Durrës would be assigned only one representative to be elected in all of constituent kazas. Essad Pasha, a member of the prominent Toptani family, would be elected MP in both elections held during the existence of the sanjak (1908 and 1912). The Toptanis during the 19th century and early 20th century were the most important family in terms of influence, wealth and power. Its members would be catalysts and participants in many important events of both the Ottoman Empire and later Independent Albania.

With the beginning of the First Balkan War in 1912, all the constituent kazas declared independence, joining the newly Albanian state. By the end of November 1912, Serbian forces occupied without resistance most of the Sanjak of Durrës under the pretext that they were occupying Ottoman territories. However, this invasion did not last long as the Great Powers never recognized this move as legitimate and later intervened, forcing the Serbian army to leave Albanian territories.

== History ==
=== Background ===
The city of Durrës was one of the last fortresses in Albanian inhabited lands to fall into the hands of the Ottomans. Since antiquity, the city had been one of the most important and well-known centers in the eastern Adriatic and the central Mediterranean region. The city was part of the battle fields in the Roman civil war between Julius Caesar and Pompey, particularly in the Battle of Dyrrhachium 48 BC. A battle of the same name took place near the city in 1081 between the Byzantine emperor Alexios I Komnenos and the Normans of southern Italy.

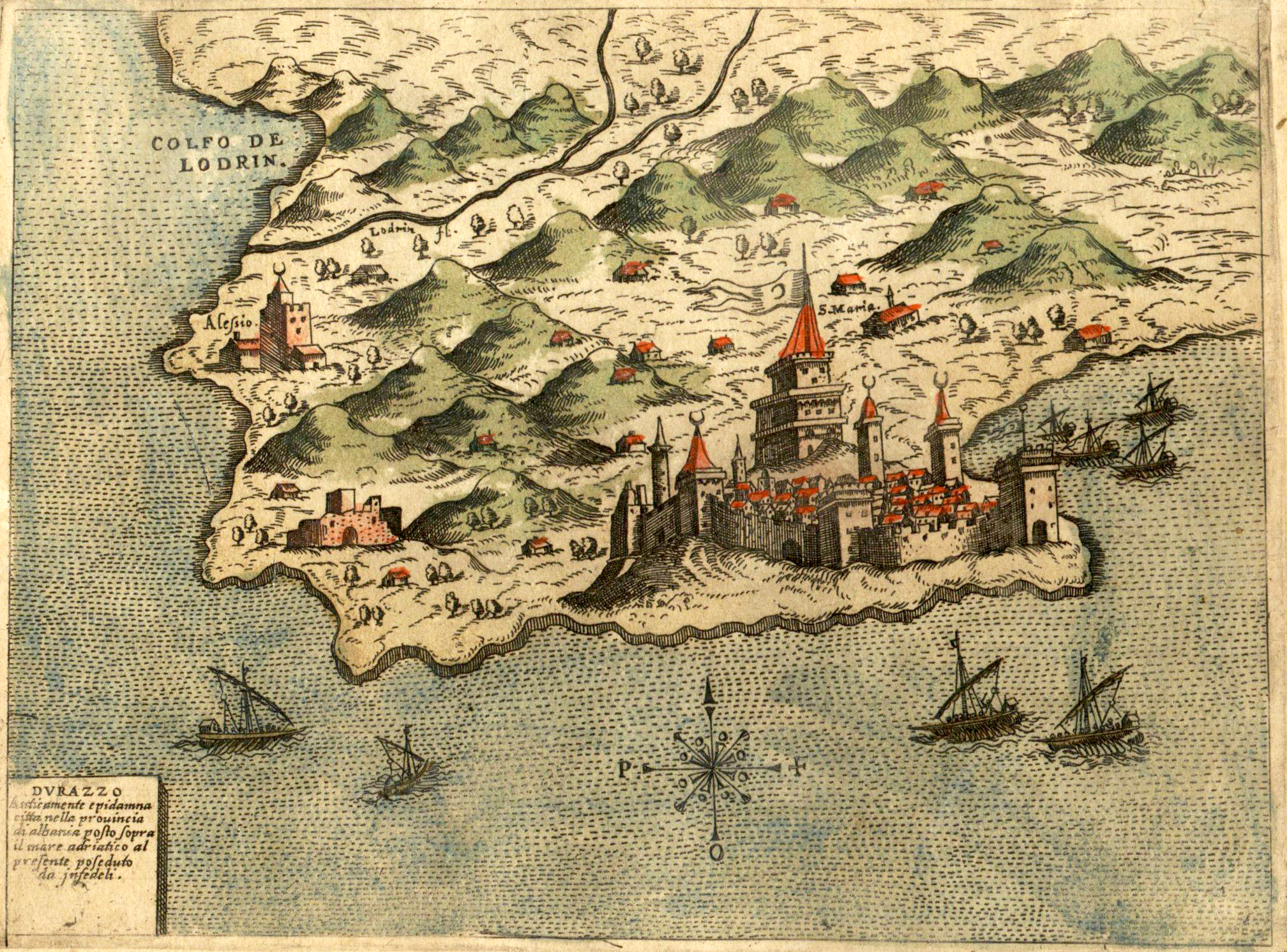
Port of Durrës in 1573

During the last period of resistance, the port city was part of Albania Veneta, a term which referred to the possessions of the Republic of Venice along the southeastern Adriatic Sea. Before the Venetians, the city and the surrounding area had been part of the Kingdom of Albania under the rule of the Angevins and the Principality of Albania under the rule of the Albanian noble family of Thopia. The city fell to the Ottomans on 17 August 1501 after it had been constantly attacked and looted throughout its last period, but also because the Venetians had repeatedly rejected the requests of the local governors to reinforce the fortress's defensive walls and send reinforcements. The attack was commanded by the sanjak-bey of Elbasan, assisted by other neighboring sanjaks, a certain Mehmed Bey (Note: There is a scientific debate among many historians that has been going on since the 20th century and continues to this day as to who was the exact identity of the conqueror of Durrës. Although, almost everyone agrees that his name was Mehmed Bey, at the time the Sanjak-bey of Elbasan. Some of the versions are Mehmed Bey Skura, a descendant of the Albanian noble family of Skuraj. Mehmed Bey Evrenosoğlu, son of the famous Ottoman commander Ali Bey Evrenosoğlu. Another claim is about a certain Mehmet Bey Çelebi, the son of Isa Bey. The latter seems to be the most plausible considering modern interpretations of Ottoman documentation and chroniclers of the time.), who was the first to enter the city with his forces. The city according to contemporary travellers and chroniclers, was in ruins and had taken on an apocalyptic appearance. Epidemics such as plague and malaria also played an important role in creating such a devastating situation. In the 1550s, Durrës and the surrounding areas seem to have turned into a center where piracy or corsairing had begun to flourish. Their main targets were Ragusan, Habsburg, and especially the Venetian merchant ships. After seizing and looting journeys, they headed to the port of Durrës, were in the Ottoman-controlled castle under whose artillery they could shelter when pursued by Venetian galleys and find support from the local authorities and population.

The city recovered partially after the defensive walls were reconstructed and trade with Venice and Ragusa resumed, but certainly not to the degree of development it enjoyed in the past. Growth would take on a new impetus with the establishment of the hereditary, autonomous, and de facto independent of the so-called Albanian Pashaliks during the late 18th and early 19th centuries. During this period the families of the Bushati rulers of Shkodër, along with the Alltunis who exerted their influence around the kaza of Kavajë, the Bargjini's in the kaza of Tirana and the Toptanis in that of Krujë, through alliances and armed conflicts between them, fought for control and influence in central Albania and especially for the Port of Durrës which was one of the most important assets of the region. In 1771, Mehmed Pasha Bushati would be given control over the Sanjaks of Dukagjin, Elbasan and Ohrid, as a reward for his activity during the Russo-Turkish war of 1768-1774. Thus placing the whole area, among others including Durrës, Kavajë, Krujë, Shijak and Tirana, under the absolute control of Pashalik of Scutari and the Bushati family for the following five decades. After the death of Kara Mahmud Pasha, the hereditary system that had been established until then was questioned since Mahmud Pasha had left no sons. The Imperial Divan started considering the possibility of dividing the pashalik into three sanjaks, one of which Sanjak of Durrës, but out of concern for the resumption of conflicts between local leaders, they were forced to approve the transfer of power into the hands of Ibrahim Pasha who was Kara Mahmud Pasha's brother. As such, the creation of the Sanjak of Durrës was put on hold at that time.

In 1831, the Bushati were overthrown from power after the military intervention of the Sublime Porte. On 3 November 1839, a period of reforms was proclaimed after the Edict of Gülhane which lasted about 35 years. It would be known as the Tanzimat era and its purpose was to modernize and consolidate the social and political foundations of the empire, as well as create a new administrative organization. One of the first reforms was the official dissolution of the feudal-military system known as the Timariot system and its replacement with a modern state structure.

Meanwhile, during this century the Toptani family emerged stronger and according to the reports of foreign consuls and documents, they were considered as the wealthiest and most powerful family in the Sanjak of Durrës and beyond it. They would own about three quarters of the usable land and the members of the family would be participants in many of the events that would take place during the last period of the empire on the Balkan Peninsula but also in the formation and important events of independent Albania.

=== Establishment and Administration ===
After the end of the Russo-Turkish war that resulted in defeat for the Ottoman Empire, and the obligations imposed on the latter at the Congress of Berlin, a new administrative reform began to be considered which would meet the socio-economic needs of the time. In order to further strengthen and increase the central government's control over the provinces, the Sublime Porte undertook in 1864 an administrative reform known as the Vilayet Law which would last several years before taking on a stable and final form. The reform replaced the eyalet administrative system with newly established vilayets. The vilayets were divided in similar subdivisions to their administrative predecessors (sanjaks, kazas and nahiyes). The Sanjak itself would be headed by a Mutasarrif who would depend directly on the Vali, who was the head of the vilayet. The two decades that followed the implementation of the law on vilayets were also the decades that brought very frequent changes in terms of boundaries in the Scutari vilayet, both due to the territories ceded in favor of Montenegro, as well as the reconfiguration of the internal borders between the vilayets and sanjaks.

In 1869, the Vilayet of Scutari was established, which included the sanjaks of Scutari, Dibra, Prizren, and İpek among others. In 1873, the extent of the Scutari vilayet was reduced in favor of the newly and short-lived Vilayet of Prizren, which included all of Kosovo along with the sanjaks of Dibra, Üsküp, and Niš. However, the most frequent and profound changes to the map of the vilayets occurred during the years of the Great Eastern Crisis (1875-1878). The administrative division of the vilayet was revised by the end of 1880 with the establishment of two sanjaks as second tier administrative units. The kazas of Peqin, Tirana, Shijak and Kavajë were attached to Durrës, which was upgraded from a kaza to the level of the sanjak. In 1892, the kaza of Peqin passed to the Sanjak of Elbasan which was dependent on the Vilayet of Manastir. Thus, the administrative division of the vilayet from 1893 remained the same until 1908, with the exception of some changes within its boundaries. Krujë was transferred to the Sanjak of Durrës in 1903 together with its surrounding area. This move would be implemented after the intervention of the Vali of the vilayet, to facilitate delivery of public services to the inhabitants, taking into account the farthest distance of the kaza between the county town of Durrës from that of Shkodër. By 1888 the Vilayet of Scutari consisted of 2 sanjaks, 8 kazas, 6 nahije and 329 villages, while in 1893 it consisted of 2 sanjaks, 8 kazas, 10 nahije and 470 villages.

== Economy and Infrastructure ==
During the first period of Ottoman rule, which coincided with the beginning of the 16th century, the city of Durrës was transformed into a center of piracy. During these years, there was a link between piracy and the city's economy, as often cargo which was looted was then sold in the city bazaar. However, by the end of the century, the area and especially the port of Durrës became one of the ports from which significant quantities of grain were exported. While sometime later there was an increase in the production and trade of olive products. An archival indication of the economy recovery of the city is the report of the Venetian consul on 28 March 1769, when he reported that the bountiful olive production of that year in the areas of Tirana, Ndroq, Prezë, and Krujë allowed the export of about 2,600 tons towards Venice alone.

In 1797, the Republic of Venice, which was also the largest trading partner of Durrës and other Albanian provinces, would be occupied without war by the army of Napoleon Bonaparte. By 1803, the two cities would have had almost no trade relations between them. The republic would be replaced by the Austrian Empire which would play a key role in the next two centuries both commercially through the port of Trieste and culturally with the formation of the Kultusprotektorat (cult protectorate). On May 13, 1880, the Sublime Porte would announce a ban on grain exports and this would will negatively affect the economy of the sanjak as the dual monarchy was the main trading partner. According to the Austrian deputy consul in the city, in fact this ban extended to other agricultural products. However, on 23 November 1881, the Porte would announce the lifting of the grain export ban and this was well received by the local population. In 1884, according to the financial records of the city of Durrës, there was a significant increase in regarding both foreign and domestic trade. The trade balance would exceed 6 million francs, and the main trading partner was unquestionably the Austro-Hungary, through sea route connection between the port of Durrës and that of Trieste, then part of the dual monarchy. Among other trading partners were Greece, Montenegro, Turkey (domestic trade with what is today's Turkey), Italy, Russia and Tunisia.

Although the land of Durrës was fertile but not properly cultivated, it was mainly cultivated a large number of cereals such as wheat, corn, barley, rice and all kinds of vegetables and fruits. These were exported to Trieste and Italy through the port of Durrës. Since the mid-19th century, the port has been part of the Österreichischer Lloyd's itinerary, which visited it every 15 days.

== Demography ==
After the Ottoman conquest of Durrës, the city had lost most of its population due to migration. The city was devastated by the recent fightings and had lost the Christian population. In addition to the Ottoman garrison with several hundred soldiers, only a few dozen families had remained in the city. According to researcher Michael Kiel, the city of Durrës right after the occupation had a population of about 1,000 inhabitants, which indicates mass migrations. While in 1610, according to reports by Bishop Marino Bizzi, the city had about 300 houses which does not show demographic growth even though more than a century had passed. While Evliya Çelebi, who visited the city sometime around 1670-71, in his Seyahatnâme (Book of travels) series states that the settlement had 150 houses. Bizzi and Çelebi's data, despite the difference in numbers, are valid to show the degradation of the city.

During the second half of 19th century, when Durrës became sanjak, the figures become clearer as they began to be recorded on the salname of Scutari vilayet. Thus, in the salname of 1310 (according to the old Hijri calendar), which coincides with the Gregorian calendar to the years 1892‒1893, the Sanjak of Durrës had a population of 87,373 inhabitants of which 78,601 were Muslims, 5,913 Orthodox, 2,797 Catholics and 62 were foreigners. In 1894 the population seems to remain more or less the same with very small changes. While in the register of 1898 the population of the Sanjak of Durrës, including the kaza of Kruja, are 78,300 Muslims, 5950 Orthodox, 5950 Catholics, and 41 foreigners making a total of 90,241 inhabitants.

In 1902, for the first time, an actual census was conducted by the central authorities, where religion was again used as a division unit similarly to the registers compiled by the local authorities. Regarding the Sanjak of Durrës (Note: Excluding the kaza of Krujë, which that year was part of the Sanjak of Scutari.), the population consisted of 75,518 Muslims and 6,883 non-Muslims. In a second census held in 1906, the Sanjak of Durrës, which including the kaza of Krujë, would have a population distribution of 81,572 Muslims, 6,098 Orthodox and 2,178 Catholics. These figures compared to a few years before show a gradual increase of each kaza, an increase which would continue in the following years.

According to the historian Kristo Frashëri, in terms of ethnic division, the Sanjak of Durrës was one of the most homogeneous with an Albanian majority. Thus, in 1912 for example, 80,700 inhabitants were ethnically Albanian from a total of about 83,000 making up to 96.6%.

Distribution of the population of the Sanjak of Durrës according to kazas and religion in 1892‒1893
Kaza	Muslim	Orthodox	Catholic	Foreigners	Total
Durrës	3,018	1,514	201	48	4,781
Kavajë	16,895	2,751	-	6	19,652
Krujë (Note: The kaza of Krujë would pass from the Sanjak of Scutari to that of Durrës only in 1903.)	12,396	-	1,796	-	14,192
Shijak	14,766	761	750	-	16,277
Tirana	31,526	887	50	8	32,471
Total	78,601	5,913	2,797	62	87,373

Distribution of the population of the Sanjak of Durrës according to kazas and religion in 1894
Kaza	Muslim	Orthodox	Catholic	Total
Durrës	3,112	1,489	199	4,800
Kavajë	17,010	2,773	-	19,783
Krujë	12,397	-	1,822	14,219
Shijak	14,896	750	732	16,378
Tirana	31,112	900	40	32,052
Total	78,527	5,912	2,793	87,232

== Governors ==
The governors or as they were otherwise known in Ottoman Mutasarrif would be the highest authority of the sanjak. Only the Vali, who was the governor of Vilajet, based in Shkodër, would stand above them. The first Mutasarrif of the sanjak was appointed Raif Effendi, who had previously served as governor of Skopje. He would stay in office only a few months as on 11 July 1881 he would pass away and be buried near the city mosque.

Name	Term in office
Raif Effendi	1881 – July 1881
Hafiz Mehmed Pasha	1881 – May 1887
Tefik Pasha	1887 – September 1901
Mehmed Hüsni Bey	1901 – ???
Mahmud Mahir Bey	October 1912 – November 1912

== See also ==
- Scutari vilayet
- Durrës

== Notes ==
=== References ===
- Hatibi, Dorian (2021), Historia e Durrësit – Nga prehistoria deri në vitin 1912 (in Albanian), vol. I, Botimet Jozef, ISBN 978-9928-317-97-1
- Frashëri, Kristo (2004), Historia e Tiranës (in Albanian), Botimet Toena, ISBN 99927-1-897-8
- Malcolm, Noel (2015), Agents of Empire: Knights, Corsairs, Jesuits and Spies in the Sixteenth-century Mediterranean World, Oxford University Press, ISBN 978-0-19-026278-5
- Malcolm, Noel (2020), Rebels, Believers, Survivors: Studies in the History of the Albanians, Oxford University Press, ISBN 978-0-19-885729-7
- Caka, Eduart (2020), "Tipologji të një qyteti bregdetar: Durrësi gjatë dy shekujve të parë të sundimit osman (Shek. XVI-XVII)" [Characteristics of a bordering town: Durrës during the first two centuries of the Ottoman rule (16th-17th centuries)], Studime Historike (in Albanian) (1–2), Academy of Albanological Studies: 63‒85, ISSN 0563-5799
- Ruka, Rudenc; Caka, Eduart; Shehi, Eduard (2020), "Shënime mbi fortifikimet e Durrësit në periudhën osmane" [Observations on Durrës fortifications in the Ottoman period], Studime Historike (in Albanian) (3–4), Academy of Albanological Studies: 61‒115, ISSN 0563-5799
- Gençoğlu, Mustafa (2015), "İşkodra vi̇layeti̇'ni̇n İdari̇ taksi̇mati ve yapisi (1867/1868-1908)" [The Administrative Division and Structure of the Province of Shkodra (1867/1868-1908)], Manisa Celal Bayar University Journal of Social Sciences (in Turkish), 13 (3): 259–290, doi:10.18026/cbusos.07372, ISSN 1304-4796
- Erken, İlkay (2014), İşkodra vilayetinin idari ve sosyal yapısı (1876-1912) [Administrative and Social Structure of the Shkodra Province (1876-1912)] (PhD) (in Turkish), Ondokuz Mayıs University
- Pollo, Stefanaq; Buda, Aleks; Prifti, Kristaq; Frashëri, Kristo, eds. (1984), Historia e Shqipërise – Vitet 30 të shek. XIX-1912 [History of Albania: 30s of the 19th century-1912] (in Albanian), vol. II, Tirana: ASA
- Filipović, Nenad (2012), "Draç'in Fethi (1501), Oruç Bin-i Âdil Vakayinâmesi ve Isâbey-oğlu Mehmet Çelebi", Prilozi Za Orijentalnu Filologiju (in Turkish) (61): 369–418, ISSN 0555-1153
- Potter, George R. (1957), The New Cambridge Modern History: The Renaissance, 1493-1520, vol. 1, Cambridge University Press, ISBN 978-0-521-04541-4
- Sezen, Tahir (2017), Osmanlı yer adları [Ottoman place names] (PDF) (in Turkish) (2nd ed.), Directorate of State Archives, ISBN 978-975-19-6682-7
