= Scutari invasion of Montenegro (1785) =

Scutari invasion of Montenegro (1785) Pushtimi i Shkodrës në Mal të Zi
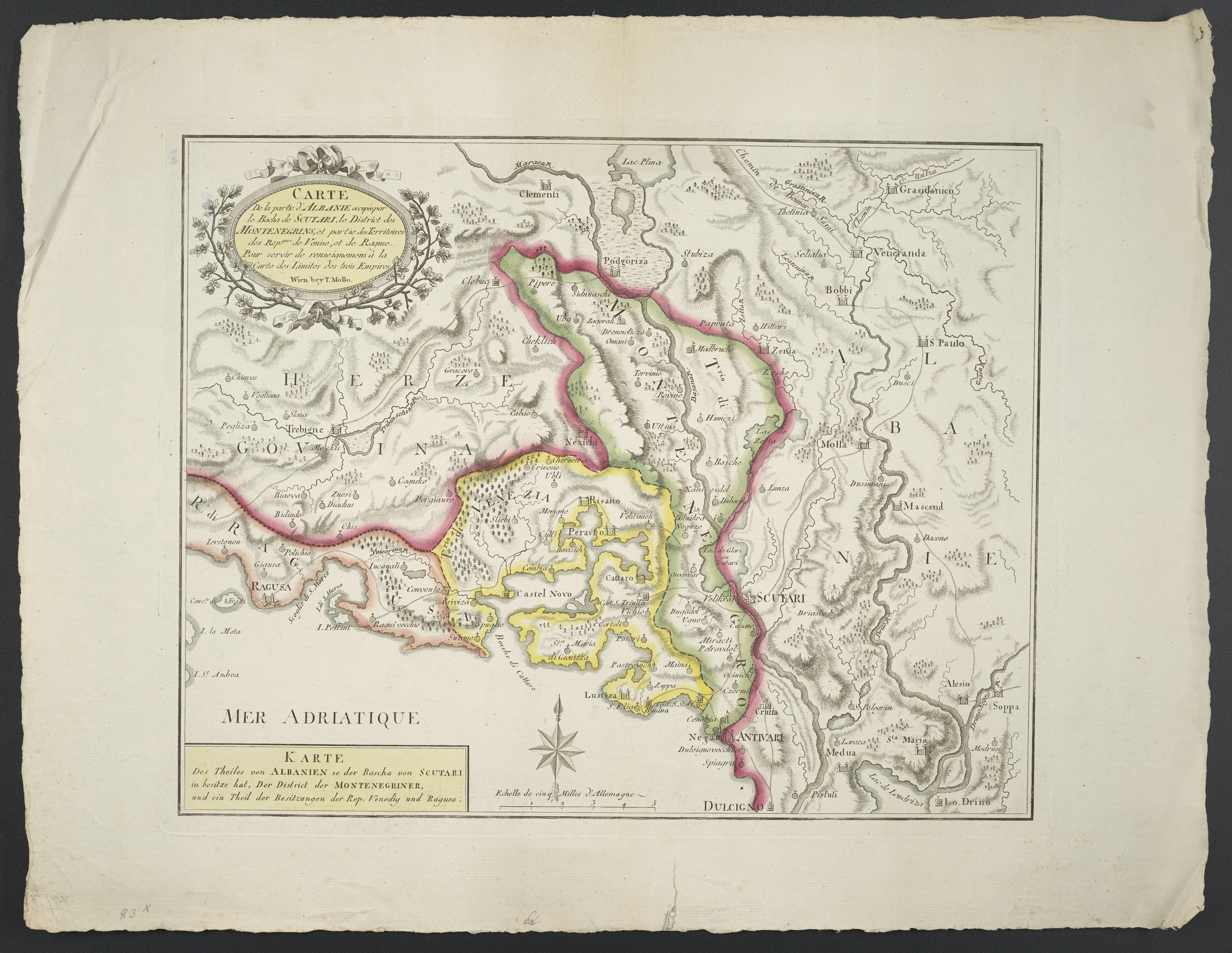
- Map of Montenegro and the surrounding region in 1780
Date	February–June 1785
Location	Old Montenegro, Podgorica and Brda (modern-day Montenegro)
Result	Pashalik of Scutari victory

Belligerents
Pashalik of Scutari	Montenegro; Republic of Venice; Bosnia Eyalet: Pashalik of Spuž

Commanders and leaders
Kara Mahmud Pasha	Petar I Petrović Njegoš; Jovan Radonjić; Rade Andrović †; Ibrahim Pasha of Spuž

Units involved
Gheg Muslims from: Shkodër; Tivari; Malësia; Kosovo; Tirana; Kavaja; Gruda; Krasniqi; Montenegrin allies from; Nikšići	Montenegrin rebels from: Old Montenegro; Paštrovići; Brda

Strength
30,000–45,000 men	8,000 men

Casualties and losses
Unknown	Unknown

The Scutari invasion of Montenegro (Albanian: Pushtimi i Shkodrës në Mal të Zi), was a military campaign launched by Kara Mahmud Pasha, the head of the Pashalik of Scutari, against the Prince-Bishopric of Montenegro, as well as the Montenegrin tribes of Old Montenegro, Paštrovići and Brda. The campaign also included the capture of Spuž, a castle which was administered by the Bosnian Pasha, Ibrahim Pasha of Spuž.

== Background ==
Kara Mahmud Pasha issued a call for a total Jihad among Gheg Albanian Muslims against the Montenegrins. Soon, volunteers from various Gheg regions such as Shkodër, Tivari (Bar), Malësia, Dibra, Gjakova, Peja, Tirana, Kavaja and other regions answered the call to join his campaign. The Montenegrins were deeply alarmed by this development. In response, in May 1785, their governor, Jovan Radonjić, send his cousin, Jovo Popov, to the capital of the Pashalik, Shkodër, imploring Kara Mahmud to reconsider his plans of attacking Montenegro.

In reply, Mahmud promised that he would halt his plans against the Montenegrins, only if they would provide hostages from Njegoš's family, settle the 16-year overdue tribute, and allow his representatives to govern Montenegro. However, when the Montenegrins convened on 9 June 1785, they agreed to offer only a portion of the overdue tribute. In response, Kara Mahmud launched the invasion, departing from Shkodër on 13 June 1785, with a force of 30,000-45,000 soldiers and cavalry, accompanied by three cannons, to begin the assault on Montenegro by both land and sea.

== Invasion ==
=== Capture of Spuž ===
In February 1785, before invading Old Montenegro, Kara Mahmud led his forces against the Bosniak Pasha, Ibrahim Pasha of Spuž, who held dominion over the territories surrounding Podgorica to the east of Old Montenegro. Following some minor skirmishes, Kara Mahmud successfully captured Podgorica. Ibrahim Pasha of Spuž chose to flee rather than confront Kara Mahmud's Albanian troops, allowing Kara Mahmud to secure the lands to the east of Old Montenegro with minimal resistance. After the successful takeover, he invited the Bosniak Pashas of Herzegovina with whom he negotiated agreements, securing his control over the area around Podgorica and an alliance with the Bosniaks. With the Podgorica district secured and his alliances in Bosnia established, in April, he returned to Shkodra to make the final preparations for the invasion of Old Montenegro.

=== Campaign in Old Montenegro ===
The clashes between Mahmud's forces and the Montenegrins began on 18 June. The most fierce battles were fought in Rijeka Crnojevića and Lješanska nahija. During the battles Kara Mahmud would devastate the tribes of Velestovo, Bjelice, Ceklin, Bjeloš and Njeguši, although the Nikšići, who cooperated with Kara Mahmud, begged him to preserve the latter. During the Invasion in 1785, guvernadur Jovan Radonjić saw Mahmud Pasha across Bjelica, after which he set his own house on fire and fled to Venetian territory. Later that day the Albanian armies would lay siege to the Montenegrin capital, which continued until 22 June 1785, when the Army of Mahmud entered Cetinje. There, they burned down the town and the Reževići Monastery. After four days of fierce fighting, the Montenegrins surrendered to Mahmud, yielding the required tribute and hostages. After the campaign Kara Mahmud settled a promised war gift, in which he gave Milić and knez Martinović two flasks filled with Ottoman copper coins, and 10 ducats each for the service they had done for him.

=== Pastrovici Campaign ===
After the successful campaign against Cetinje, Mahmud made the decision to return to his capital by sea, departing from the port-city of Tivar (Bar). On the 27th of June, he approached the Venetian governor of Kotor, who held authority over the Paštrovići region, seeking permission to pass through the lands of the Venetian republic. Following long consultations, they allowed to Mahmud's passage through their territories. However, when Kara Mahmud crossed Paštrovići on the 29th of June at the Kašćela height, Rade Andrović (a Serbian Orthodox priest) and his two friends approached and failed to assassinate him. Following this, Kara Mahmud slew all three of them. Following the ambush, Mahmud swiftly ordered the pillaging and burning of Paštrovići, he perpetrated numerous atrocities in the area, with some scholars estimating a death toll exceeding two hundred. Additionally, the pasha oversaw the destruction of monasteries and the burning of many homes, leaving the place in ruins. On June 30, after decapitating the notables of the tribe, Mahmud proceeded to Tivar (Bar) and, with his waiting fleet, returned to Shkodra.

== Aftermath ==
Following his triumph in the Montenegro invasion, Kara Mahmud began receiving tribute from the Montenegrins. He then turned his attention to his long-standing rival, Ahmet Kurt Pasha, who was the leader of the Pashalik of Berat in Central Albania. In the same year, 1785, Kara Mahmud launched an invasion and emerged victorious. Kara Mahmud's authority over the Montenegrins would persist for another 11 years, ending only after his defeat and demise during his second invasion of Montenegro in 1796.

== Sources ==
- Gjeli, Ardit (2018), Between Rebellion and Obedience: The Rise and Fall of Bushatli Mahmud Pasha of Shkodra (1752-1796) (PDF), İstanbul Şehir University, archived from the original (PDF) on 2024-03-01. PDF
- Jazexhi, Olsi (2018), Kara Mmahmud Pashë Bushati, Bualli i Shkodrës (1776–1796 ER/1190–1211 AH) (PDF), Dielli, archived (PDF) from the original on 2018-08-19
- Stamatović, Aleksandar (2022), The Politics of Kara Mahmud Pasha Bushati Towards Montenegro in the 1780s (PDF), Journal of Ottoman Legacy Studies, University of East Sarajevo: Pale, Republic of Srpska, archived from the original (PDF) on 2024-06-06
