= Andrović =

Andrović is a surname. Notable people with the surname include:

- Rade Andrović (fl. 1785), Serbian Orthodox priest
- Rafo Andrović (1771–1841), Ragusan poet
