= Kara Mahmud Pasha =

Ottoman-Albanian ruler of Scutari from 1775 to 1796

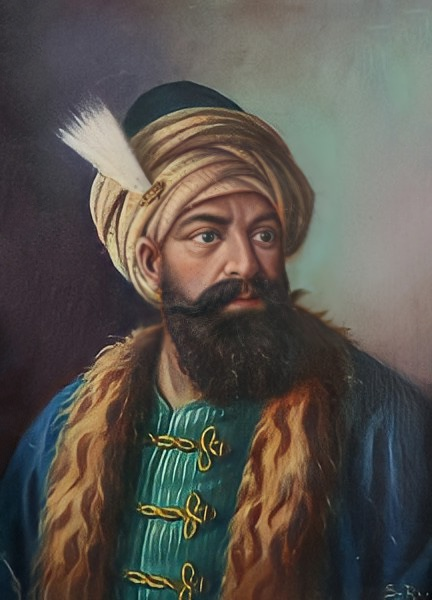
- Portrait of Kara Mahmud Pasha at the National Art Gallery, Tirana by Simon Rrota

Governor of Scutari
- Reign: June 1775–September 1796
- Predecessor: Mehmed Pasha
- Successor: Ibrahim Pasha
- Born: Sanjak of Scutari, Ottoman Empire
- Died: 22 September 1796; Krusi, Montenegro
- Wars and battles: Orlov revolt; First Scutari-Montenegrin War; Battle of Ulcinj 1785; First Scutari-Berat War; Second Scutari-Berat War; Battle of Peqin; Zadrima revolt; First Işbuzi revolt; Third Scutari-Berat War; Battle of Tirana; First Battle of Kavaja; Battle of Durrës; Kruja raid; Siege of Tirana; Second Battle of Kavaja; Battle of Durrës; Second Işbuzi revolt; Second Scutari-Montenegrin War; Battle of Işbuzi; Battle of Crmničani; Capture of Cetinje; Fourth Scutari-Berat War; Siege of Peqin; Battle of Elbasan; Siege of Berat; Myzeqe Campaign; Battle of Korçë; Battle near Peqin; Battle near Peqin; Kara Mahmud's campaign against Venice; First Scutari-Ottoman War; Siege of Shkodra; Conflicts with the Tosk Pashas; Second Scutari-Ottoman War; Battle of Prizren; First Siege of Shkodra; Second Siege of Shkodra; Third Scutari-Montenegrin War; Battle of Lopate; Battle of Martinići; Battle of Krusi †
- Family: Bushati
- Issue: Mustafa Pasha
- Father: Mehmed Pasha

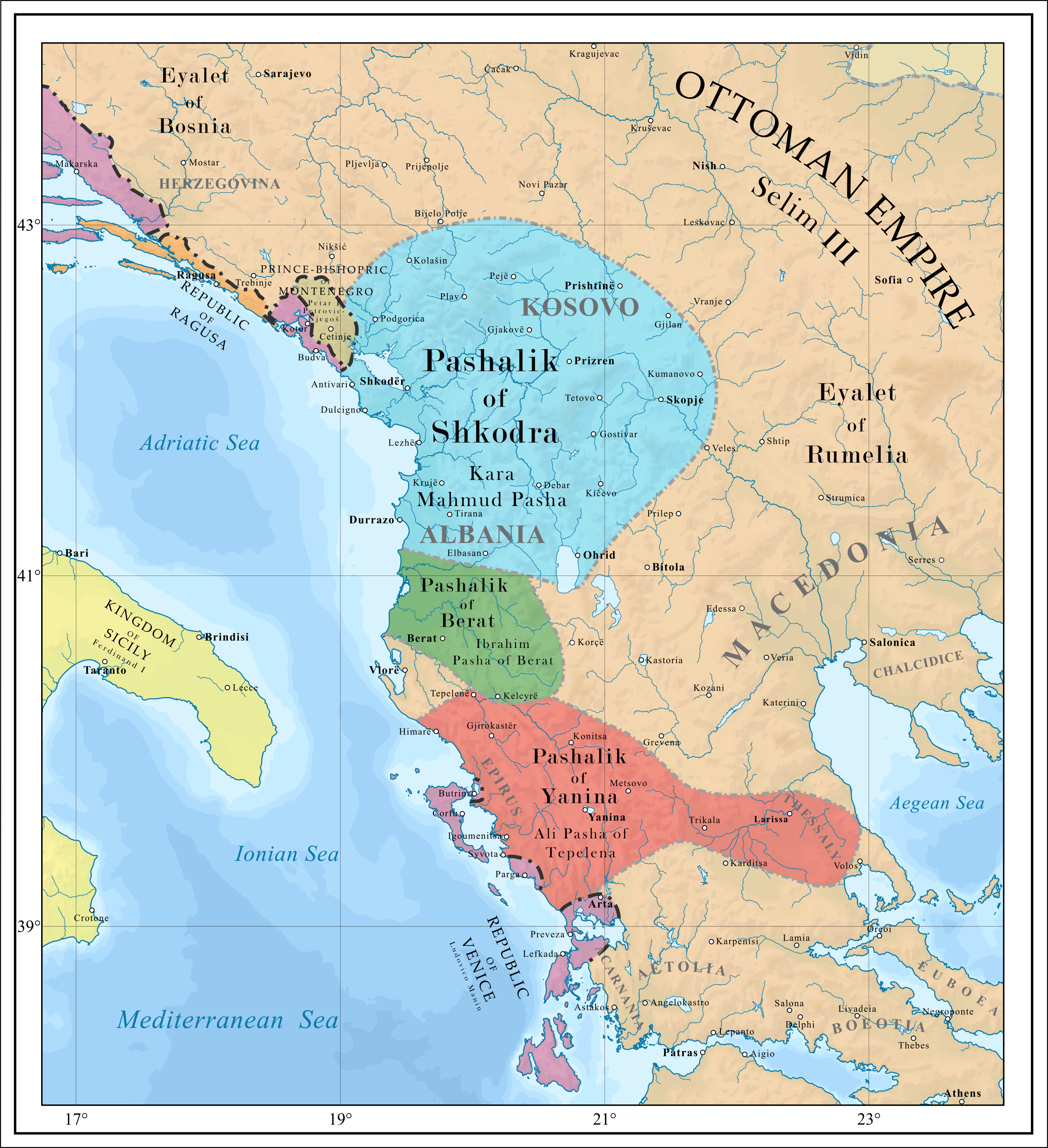
Pashalik of Shkodra in 1790-1795 under the rule of Kara Mahmud Pasha.

Kara Mahmud Pasha (Turkish: Kara Mahmut Paşa, Albanian: Mahmut Pashë Bushati, fl. 1749 – 22 September 1796) was a hereditary Ottoman Albanian governor (mutasarrıf) of the Pashalik of Scutari who became de facto independent ruler of Albania, challenging the authority of the Sublime Porte.

== Early life and ancestry ==
Mahmud was born during the 18th-century in the Sanjak of Scutari in Ottoman Albania. He belonged to the Albanian Bushati family. Mahmud was the son of Mehmed Pasha Bushati, the governor of the Pashalik of Scutari, and in the period of the late 18th-century, Kara Mahmud sought to expand northwards in the old lands of Ivan Crnojević of the Middle Ages. In order to legitimize and strengthen his claim, he put forward a theory that he descended from Skenderbeg Crnojević, Ivan's Muslim son

== Military career ==
=== Military service under his father and brother ===
In 1770 Mahmud together with his brother Mustafa crushed Greek rebels during the Orlov revolt. In 1772 Mahmud in service of his father, led an Army against Montenegro in Ulcinj, where he defeated the Montenegrin forces and captured the city. In 1775, Mahmud led an Army against Ahmet Kurt Pasha and defeated him on behalf of his father Mehmed. The Conflict between Ahmet Kurt Pasha and Mehmed Pasha Bushati was caused by Ahmet's interest to take possession of the wealthy region of Durrës. When Mehmed Pasha died in June 1775, the Sultan's rule was not returned to northern Albania; he was succeeded by his oldest son, Mahmud's brother Mustafa Pasha.

Mahmud's brother, Mustafa Pasha immediately began to make plans for an Attack against Ahmet Kurt Pasha of the Pashalik of Berat. Thus on 13 September 1775, Mustafa's forces clashed with Ahmet Kurt Pasha's forces at the town of Peqini, where Mustafa suffered a terrible defeat against Ahmet, who dealt the Bushatlis a hard blow by destroying their army. The Bushatlis in a single battle lost almost all the southern regions of the pashalik, thus diminishing their area of influence. Meanwhile, Mahmud successfully led an Army against Tribesmen of the Zadrima region that were revolting and collaborating with Ahmet Kurt Pasha against the Bushatlis. Mahmud also led an Army against the revolting pasha of Işbuzi in the northern part of the Pashalik, but failed to suppress the revolt. During Mustafa Pasha's reign, the Pashalik lost all southern regions and access to the Adriatic coast, furthermore his defeat against Ahmet Kurt Pasha caused several revolts all over the pashalik. Subsequently, to all of these events, Mustafa Pasha left his position in and Mahmud became the official Pasha of Shkodra.

=== First War with the Pashalik of Berat ===
Right After Mahmud became Pasha, Ahmet Kurt Pasha started arresting Mahmud's merchants. Mahmud Pasha responded in the same way, arresting more than fifty merchants of Tirana and Kruja who were trading livestock in Shkodra. These incidents signified the beginning of a new regional conflict between the most influential pashas that would re-define the balances in Ottoman Albania. At the start of the conflict, Mahmud tried to avoid direct military combat with Ahmet Kurt Pasha and instead tried to weaken Ahmet's influence in Central Albania, by eliminating his allies. At the same time Ahmet Kurt Pasha lost a great source of power and influence in the region, when he was dismissed as the governor of the Vlora and Durrës districts. Furthermore, complete Anarchy broke out in the Pashalik of Berat, when Ibrahim Beg (Mahmud's Father in Law) revolted in Tirana against Ahmet Kurt Pasha. After Ahmet's forces recaptured Tirana, Ibrahim Beg fled to Shkodra, where Mahmud would grant him a 500 men strong Army to retake Tirana in his service. After a short engagement, the Shkodran forces retook Tirana and Ibrahim Beg regained control over the city. Soon the fighting in Central Albania escalated into a civil war, this is when Mahmud took advantage of the situation and marched into Central Albania with 6,000 men. He captured Kavaja and installed a puppet as Gouverneur. After re-establishing Shkodran influence in Kavaja, Mahmud would march to Kruja to eliminate the Toptani family, which he viewed as a local threat. He raided the town and set more than 100 houses on fire but avoided a general attack on the castle of Kruja, where the Toptani family fortified themselves, fearing this could cause a conflict between him and the central government. For this reason, he withdrew back to Shkodra, waiting for an official decree that could permit him to eliminate the Toptanis and thus putting an end to the anarchy and to the influence of Ahmet Kurt Pasha in central Albania.

In late 1779, Ahmet Kurt Pasha organized a Meeting with local Albanian pashas in Elbasan between Him, the Toptanis of Kruja, Suleiman Pasha of Elbasan and the Gouverneur of Rumelia. They aimed to recapture land Ahmet Kurt Pasha previously lost after Mahmud's campaigns, and to eliminate him or exile him out of Shkodra by launching a large military campaign against him. The coalition first aimed to take Kavaja, where 8,000 men under the command of Ahmet Kurt Pasha assaulted the town, but instead of quickly overrunning it, they met fierce resistance by Suleiman Beg, who held the town for 20 days despite being heavily outnumbered, before retreating to Durrës. The Long resistance by Suleiman Beg in Kavaja gave Ibrahim Beg of Tirana enough time to mobolize an Army of 6,000 men. The siege of Tirana began in February and lasted for two months, resulting in Ibrahim Beg's surrender due to a shortage of provisions. On 13 April 1780, Kurd Pasha declared himself the tax-farmer of Durrës and responsible for maintaining order in the region. He then moved against Shkodra despite opposition from the pasha of Berat and his supporters. However, efforts to overthrow Mahmud and remove him from the political scene failed when a Tatar sent from the center informed the parties that the central government had forgiven Bushatli Mahmud for his past actions. Moreover, Çavuşoğlu Mehmed was appointed as governor in the district of Shkup, while Mahmud became governor of the districts of Shkodra and Dukakin. Kurd Ahmed Pasha was confirmed as subcontractor and administrator in Durrës and was instructed to allow Suleiman Beg and Ibrahim Beg to return to their respective locations.

In June 1780, Mahmud and Ahmet Kurt Pasha were again in conflict over the control of the tax-farming of Durrës and its port, which was one of the primary Ottoman ports on the Adriatic. Mahmud was reappointed as governor of Shkodra in June 1780 but Durrës remained under the authority of Ahmet Kurt Pasha. Mahmud eventually took possession of Durrës. Mahmud attacked Durrës with an army of ten thousand troops and was assisted by Ibrahim Beg of Tirana and Suleiman Beg of Kavaja. This campaign caused significant damage and instability in central Albania and the Ottoman authorities estimated the damage to be around ten thousand kuruş. Mahmud then turned his attention to the northern borders of the Pashalik and the troublesome Pasha of Işbuzi. He defeated him and pillaged the region.

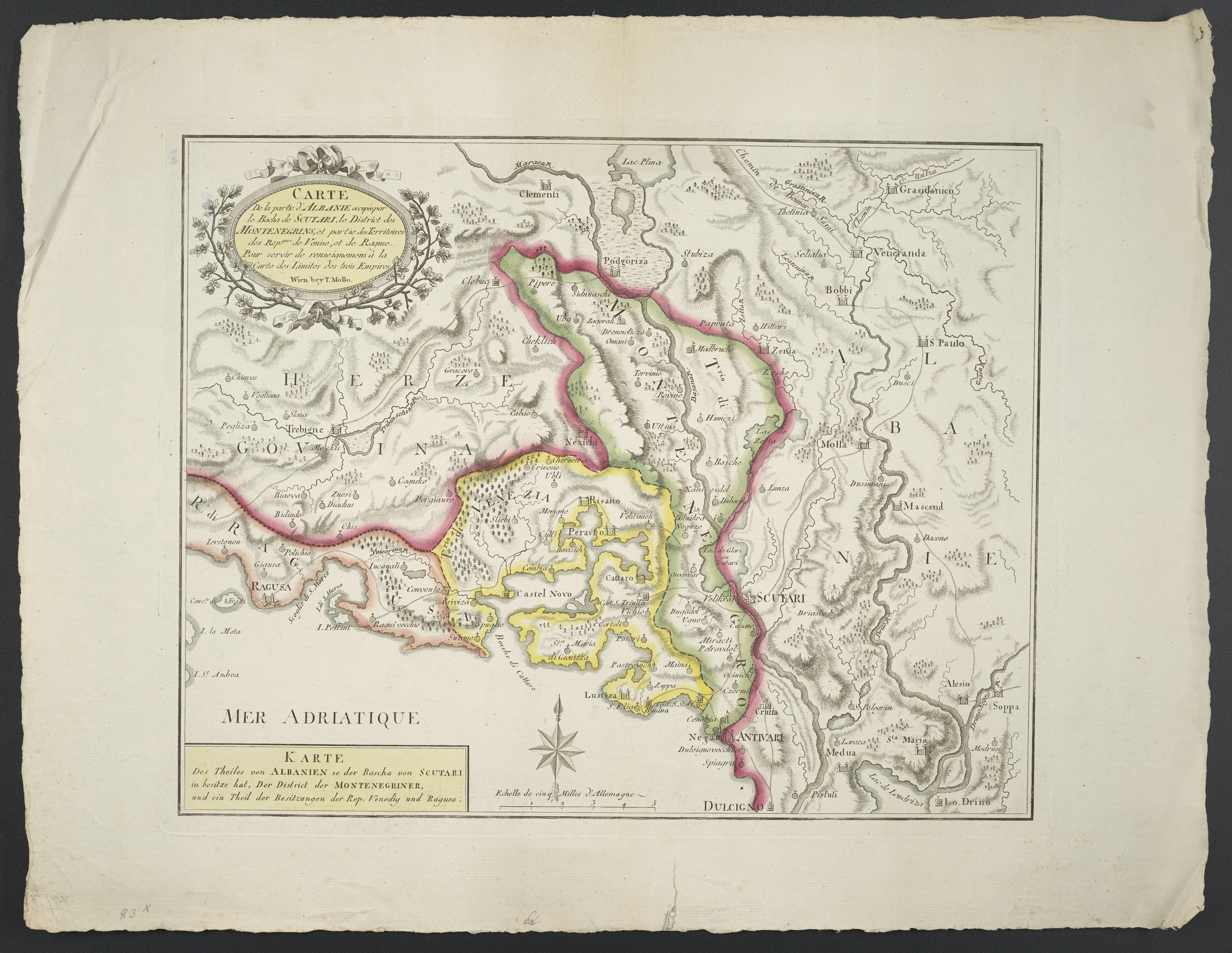
Map of Montenegro and the surrounding areas in 1780

=== First War with the Montenegrins and Venetians ===
His major quarrels were with Montenegro and Venice, which he attacked and defeated in 1785. Mahmud had been infiltrating Montenegro and inciting disputes between its leaders for a long time. Mahmud began to gather his allies and mobilize his army for an offensive in late February. Mahmud secured the flanks by attacking Işbuzi castle and making alliances with Bosnian pashas.

Kara Mahmud Pasha called all Muslim Ghegs to Jihad against the Montenegrins and after gathering an army of around 30,000 troops, Mahmud invaded Montenegro from both sea and land and conquered it in just four days. During his attack in Montenegro he defeated a Montenegrin army of 8,000 men in Crmničani. He also captured and burned the Montenegrin capital Cetinje, subdued and enslaved the Montenegrin tribes, forced the Venetians to pay him tribute and plundered the entire country, including the library and treasury of the Reževići Monastery. During the Attack on Montenero in 1785, guvernadur Jovan Radonjić saw Mahmud Pasha's army across Bjelica, he set his own house on fire and fled to Venetian territory. Mahmud Pasha also went to burn down the Njeguši tribe, but the Nikšići asked him to preserve it, because they had trading relations with them. Mahmud Pasha settled the promised war gift; he gave Milić and knez Martinović two flasks filled with Ottoman copper coins, and 10 ducats each for the service they had done for him. Mahmud Pasha then crossed with his army through Paštrovići to return to Scutari. When he crossed Paštrovići at the Kašćela height near the church, Rade Andrović and his two friends approached and failed to assassinate him. Following this, Mahmud slew all three of them.

=== Second War with the Pashalik of Berat ===
Following the assault on Montenegro, Mahmud shifted his focus to the south, where two Albanian pashas, Kurd Ahmed Pasha and Suleiman Pasha of Elbasan, were causing trouble. The conflict between them was ignited in March 1785 when Mahmud arrested two Venetian captains of the Ivanovich-Dabinovich company for violating the ronda system and importing wheat, which resulted in a punishment by the governor of Shkodra. As a partner in the company, Kurd Ahmed Pasha responded by closing the ports under his authority to the Dulcignote fleet, openly challenging Mahmud. Meanwhile, the disrespectful treatment of Mahmud's sister by the pasha of Elbasan added fuel to the fire. Mahmud had initially postponed dealing with these issues due to the Montenegro campaign but immediately started planning an attack on the two pashas upon his return.

Under Mahmud's influence, a separatist faction was formed in Berat to weaken the district from within before attacking it from outside. Mahmud also negotiated with Ali Pasha of Tepelena, a new provincial notable who planned to take charge of the strategic district of Ioannina if Kurd Pasha did not interfere. The governor of Shkodra received another decree of forgiveness, and he and his brother were pardoned on the condition that they not interfere with the appointments in Podgorica and Işbuzi.

Mahmud consolidated his power in Ottoman Albania and spread his influence beyond the Paşalık of Shkodra by creating alliances with the Bosnian pashas of Hercegowina and in southern Albania with Ali Pasha of Tepelena. Ahmet Kurt Pasha mobilized about fifteen thousand troops inside the city of Berat, aware of the risky situation. The Bushatlis dispatched the army to Southern Albania and Mahmud decided to neutralize Ahmet Kurt Pasha and his allies, by attacking them from all sides. Mahmud successfully besieged Peqin and attacked Elbasan, defeating Suleiman Pasha. Mahmud then restored order in the region and directed his forces to Berat, where he surrounded the Ahmet Kurt Pasha in his castle.

The Bushatlis divided the army into two parts, with one army moving towards Myzeqe, while Mahmud neutralized the notables of Korça and then joined Ali Pasha of Tepelena, who was attacking the Pashalik of Berat from the southeast. Ahmet Kurt Pasha then managed to break the siege and decided to help his ally in Peqin. However, Mahmud reached the army of Ahmet Kurt Pasha before his arrival in Peqin and dealt him a decisive blow in battle, destroying the entire Army of Ahmet Kurt Pasha. The southern Military Campaign was huge success for Mahmud, who conquered most of the Pashalik of Berat and massively expanded his realm, leaving only Berat in the Hands of Ahmet Kurt Pasha.

=== First War with the Ottomans ===
In 1787, an Ottoman army was sent to subdue Kara Mahmud, the Ottoman Army also laid siege to the Rozafa Castle for three months, but had to retreat, after Kara Mahmud threatened to switch his allegiance to Austria-Hungary, and thus received an imperial pardon.

=== Conflicts with the Tosk Pashas ===
During his conflict with the southern Albanian Pashas he was approached by the Austrians and Russians who wanted to use him against the Ottomans. They offered to convert Kara Mahmud Pasha to Christianity, thus recognizing him as king of Albania. He accepted the proposal, however, upon learning that they wanted to hand his lands to Montenegro, he rejected their offers in 1788, and beheaded the delegation, sending their heads as trophies to the Ottoman Sultan who pardoned him for his quarrels with the local Pashas.

=== Second War with the Ottomans ===
In 1795 he conquered parts of Southern Albania and much of Kosovo. Through these efforts, he hoped to create an independent state free from Ottoman control. However, by annexing the Sanjak as well as large parts of Montenegro and by instituting military and political reforms in his state without permission from the Porte, the Ottomans sent an expedition into his realm and besieged Scutari, which was garrisoned by his most faithful men. The siege was lifted and the Ottoman expedition retreated after being defeated by Kara Mahmud's forces, then returned but again failed to complete the siege.

=== Second War with the Montenegrins ===
Kara Mahmud Pasha launched another offensive on Montenegro in 1796, following its proclaimed unification with Ottoman-ruled Brda region. His army was ambushed by Montenegrins and suffered an initial defeat in July in the Battle of Martinići, but continued military operations until September, when Montenegrin tribes of Piperi and Bjelopavlići defeated his army in the Battle of Krusi. Before Kara Mahmud was killed and decapitated in battle, it is said that he single-handedly slew 32 Montenegrins during his last stand while being surrounded by Montenegrin soldiers.

Kara Mahmud's death in 1796 came just as he was embarking on his most ambitious plan of all, a conquest of much of the western Balkans as an independent ally of the revolutionary French army.

== Aftermath ==
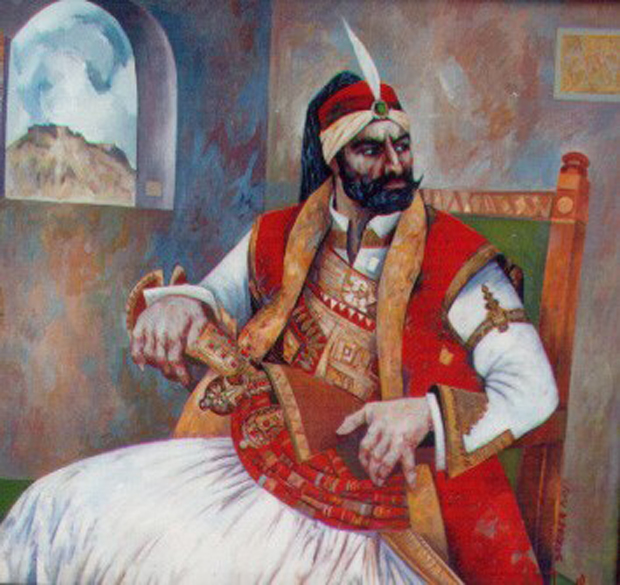
Modern portrait of Kara-Mahmut Pasha by Ismail Lulani in luxurious attire.

His brother Ibrahim Pasha continued to rule Scutari under the Ottoman sultan until his death in 1810. Ibrahim served as Beylerbey of Rumelia and played an important role on ending the First Serbian Uprising led by Karađorđe. Upon Ibrahim's death, he was succeeded by Kara Mahmud's son, Mustafa Pasha.

== Legacy ==
- A northern Albanian folkloric song dealing with Mahmud Pasha's conflict with the Montenegrins is Kanga e Kara Mahmud Pashes Kundra Malazezve (The Song of Kara Mahmud Pasha against the Montenegrins).

== Annotations ==
- In Albanian he is known as Kara Mahmud Pashë Bushati. In Serbian, he is known as Mahmut-paša Bušatlija (Махмут-паша Бушатлија), or simply Kara-Mahmut (Кара-Махмут). Robert Elsie calls him by the Albanian neologism "Kara Mahmud Pasha Bushatlliu".

== Bibliography ==
- Anscombe, Frederick (2006). The Ottoman Balkans: 1750-1830. Princeton, New Jersey: Markus Wiener Publishers. ISBN 978-1-55876-383-8.
- Brisku, Adrian (2013). Bittersweet Europe: Albanian and Georgian Discourses on Europe, 1878–2008. Berghahn Books. ISBN 978-0-85745-985-5.
- Dauti, Daut (30 January 2018). Britain, the Albanian Question and the Demise of the Ottoman Empire 1876–1914 (phd). University of Leeds.
- Hickok, Michael Robert (1997). Ottoman Military Administration in Eighteenth-Century Bosnia. Leiden, New York, Köln: BRILL. ISBN 90-04-10689-8.
- Jazexhiu, Olsi (2002). The Albanian Pashalik of Shkodra under Bushatlis 1757 – 1831. Kuala Lumpur: IIUM. Archived from the original on 2015-06-27.
- Jaxhezi, Olsi. "Kara Mahmud Pashë Bushati: Bualli i Shkodrës". Archived from the original on 11 April 2011.
- Jelavich, Barbara (1983). History of the Balkans: Eighteenth and Nineteenth Centuries. Vol. 1. Cambridge: Cambridge University Press. ISBN 0-521-25249-0.
- Malcolm, Noel (1998). Kosovo: A Short History. Washington Square, New York: New York University Press. ISBN 978-0-8147-5598-3.
- Roberts, Elizabeth (2007). Realm of the Black Mountains: A History of Montenegro. Ithaca, New York: Cornell University Press. ISBN 978-0-8014-4601-6.
- Shaw, Stanford (1971). Between Old and New: The Ottoman Empire under Sultan Selim III (1789-1807). Cambridge, Massachusetts: Harvard University Press. ISBN 9780674068308.
- Stanojević, Gligor; Vasić, Milan (1975). Istorija Crne Gore (3): od početka XVI do kraja XVIII vijeka. Titograd: Redakcija za istoriju Crne Gore. OCLC 799489791.
- Tafilica, Zamir; Baze, Ermal; Lafe, Ols (2023). "Historical Background". In Galaty, Michael L.; Bejko, Lorenc (eds.). Archaeological Investigations in a Northern Albanian Province: Results of the Projekti Arkeologjik i Shkodrës (PASH): Volume One: Survey and Excavation Results. Memoirs Series. Vol. 64. University of Michigan Press. ISBN 9781951538736.

| Preceded by Mehmed Pasha | Pasha of Scutari; June 1775 – September 1796 | Succeeded by Ibrahim Pasha |
