= Petrit Bushati =

Albanian ambassador

Petrit Bushati (20 October 1948 – 22 November 2014) was an Albanian ambassador to the Republic of Macedonia.

From 2002 to 2006 he served as an ambassador to Belgrade, and since the beginning of 2006 was appointed ambassador to the Republic of Macedonia. Following it, he became an ambassador to Serbia, Denmark, Norway, Finland, Iceland, Sweden the United States, and since 2014 was a diplomat to Skopje.

He is a part of the Bushati family a feudal Albanian family in the Ottoman era.

When he died, his funeral was attended by the President of Albania Bujar Nishani, former Foreign Minister Aldo Bumçi, Transportation Minister Edmond Haxhinasto, and Ramush Haradinaj from Kosovo.
