= Ibrahim Pasha of Scutari =

Ottoman governor of Scutari from 1796 to 1810

Ibrahim Pasha

Governor of Scutari
- Reign: September 1796–1810
- Predecessor: Kara Mahmud Pasha
- Successor: Mustafa Pasha
- Born: Sanjak of Scutari, Ottoman Empire
- Died: 1810
- Family: Bushati
- Father: Mehmed Pasha

Ibrahim Bushati or Ibrahim Bushat Pasha (Turkish: Buşatlı İbrahim Paşa; died 1810) was a noble of the Bushati family in Ottoman controlled Albania near the city of Shkodër. Brother of Kara Mahmud Bushati, the Ottoman appointed governor of Shkodër, Albania. During his rule in Shkodra, Ibrahim was appointed Beylebey of Rumelia in 1805 and took part in the attempt to crush the First Serbian Uprising under Karađorđe Petrović after the Battle of Ivankovac. Ibrahim Bushati is also known to have aided Ali Pasha on various occasions. In fact Ali Pasha's two sons Muktar Pasha and Veil Pasha are known to have served under the command of Ibrahim Bushati in 1806.

Ibrahim Bushati inherited a very turbulent position at Shkodër, especially after the events of the First Serbian Uprising and consistently worked closely with the Ottoman Empire right up until his death in 1810. He was succeeded by Mustafa Reshit Pasha.

== See also ==
- Mustafa Bushati
- Osman Gradaščević

Preceded by Kara Mahmud Bushati	Pasha of Scutari; 1796–1810	Succeeded by Mustafa Reshit Pasha
