= Rade Andrović =

Rade Andrović (Serbian: Раде Андровић; fl. 1785) was a Serbian Orthodox priest and legendary hero from the Paštrovići clan, that is remembered for his failed assassination of the Pasha of İşkodra Kara Mahmud Bushati.

In the summer of 1785, the victorious Pasha Mahmud Bushatli crossed into Paštrović tribal region after his campaign in Montenegro. Rade promised that he would kill the pasha in his tent in Castellastua after having originally swore that the Paštrovići would not be devastated by the Ottoman Turks. Upon reaching the pasha's tent, his gun jammed and the Turks slew him. Stjepan Mitrov Ljubiša, for his act, called him The New Obilić, referring to Miloš Obilić's heroic murder of Sultan Murad I in his tent during the Battle of Kosovo.

== Sources ==
- Đorđe V. Gregović, O PAŠTROVIĆIMA
