= Mehmed Bushati =

Ottoman governor of Scutari from 1757 to 1775

Governor of Scutari
- Reign: 1757 – June 1775
- Successor: Mahmud Pasha
- Born: Sanjak of Scutari, Ottoman Empire
- Died: June 1775
- Family: Bushati
- Issue: Mahmud Pasha

Mehmed Bushati (r. 1757 – June 1775) was the governor of the Pashalik of Scutari and founder of the notable Albanian Bushatli dynasty of Shkodër

== History ==
=== Sanjak of Scutari ===
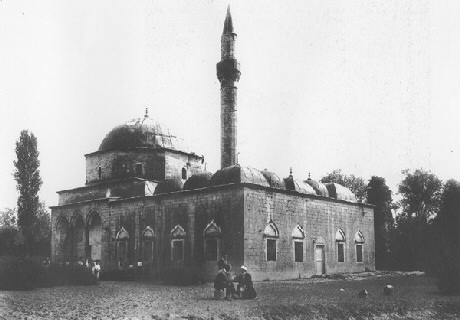
Near the Lead Mosque is the resting place of Mehmed Bushati

In 1757, Mehmed Pasha became the governor of the pashalik of Scutari. In 1769, he fought in Zadrima. In 1770, he fought in Morea against Greeks and Russians, and in 1772 he and his son participated in the march on Ulcinj. He continued the Scutari pretensions over Montenegro and Brda, and planned to suppress their revolt; in early April 1774, he was in Podgorica and met with some chieftains of the northern Albanian tribes to discuss the planned operation. In 1774, in the same month of the death of Šćepan Mali, he attacked the Kuči and Bjelopavlići with 15,000 troops, but was decisively defeated and returned to Scutari. This campaign had a great impact on the Kuči tribe which was described as "destroyed".

=== Rivalry with Ahmet Kurt Pasha ===
In 1775, Mehmed's son, Kara Mahmud Pasha, led an Army against Ahmet Kurt Pasha and defeated him on behalf of his father. The conflict between Ahmet Kurt Pasha and Mehmed Pasha Bushati was caused by Ahmet's interest to take control of Durrës.

=== Death ===
Mehmed Pasha Bushati died in June 1775.

== Annotations ==
1. Turkish: Buşatlı Mehmet Paşa, Albanian: Mehmed Bushatlliu, Serbian: Mehmed-paša Bušatlija/Мехмед-паша Бушатлија

== Bibliography ==
- Jazexhiu, Olsi (2002). The Albanian Pashalik of Shkodra under Bushatlis 1757 – 1831. Kuala Lumpur: IIUM. Archived from the original on 2015-06-27.

Preceded by Post created	Pasha of Scutari; 1768 – June 1775	Succeeded by Mahmud Pasha
