= Sanjak of Elbasan =

Subdivision of the Ottoman Empire in Albania

- Sanjak of Ottoman Empire
- 1466–1913
- Capital: Elbasan
- History
  - Construction of the Elbasan fortress: 1466
  - First Balkan War: 1913
Preceded by	Succeeded by
League of Lezhë	Independent Albania
- Today part of: Albania

The Sanjak of Elbasan (Turkish: İlbasan Sancağı; Albanian: Sanxhaku i Elbasanit) was one of the sanjaks of the Ottoman Empire. Its county town was Elbasan in Albania.

== Administration ==
Although Halil Inalcik explains that the Sanjak of Elbasan was established as soon as the fortress of Elbasan has been constructed, based on Tursun Beg's records there is a possibility that Elbasan initially was part of the Sanjak of Ohrid.

Marino Bizzi, the Archbishop of Bar (Antivari), stated in his report that on May 17, 1591, that name of the sanjakbey of Sanjak of Elbasan was Mehmet Bey. During the reign of Köprülü Fazıl Mustafa Pasha (1637 – August 19, 1691) one of the sanjakbeys of Elbasan was Hasan Pasha. In 1714 the sanjabey of the Sanjak of Elbasan was Zejnil-beg.

In the second half of the 19th century, during the general administrative reform that followed the Russo-Turkish War and the obligations arising from the Congress of Berlin, the Sanjak of Elbasan was included in the Vilayet of Manastir. The administrative subdivisions of the sanjak were the kazas of Elbasan, Gramsh and Peqin.

At the beginning of 20th century sanjakbey of Elbasan was Necib Efendi, who was transferred to another position in February 1904.

== History ==
=== Disestablishment ===
During the First Balkan War at the end of 1912 the Sanjak of Elbasan together with most of the territory of Albania was occupied and de facto annexed by the Kingdom of Serbia. The Sanjak of Elbasan was on 29 November included in the Serbian administrative system as a srez (Serbian: Срез Елбасан) within Drač County (Serbian: Драчки округ), one of four srezes (the other being Drač, Lješ, Tirana). In 1914 Elbasan became a part of the newly established Principality of Albania, established on the basis of peace contract signed during the London Conference of 1912–13.

== Demographics ==
=== 15th century ===
In 1467 many Christians from Skopje, Ohrid, Serres and Kastoria were forcibly deported to Elbasan.

=== 16th century ===
At the beginning of the 16th century the Sanjak of Elbasan had the highest population density of all Ottoman sanjaks in the Balkans, with 5.65 per square kilometre (14.6/sq mi). Between 1520 and 1535 up to 94,5% population of the Sanjak of Elbasan were Christians.

=== 17th century ===
An Ottoman traveller Evliya Çelebi recorded in 1670 that Elbasan had 18 quarters with Muslim population and 10 quarters populated by an Orthodox and Roman Catholic population. He also stated that Serbs, Bulgarians and Voyniks (Ottoman Christian mercenaries) were not allowed to take up residence in Elbasan, otherwise they would be immediately slain according to ancient custom. The Albanian language was spoken by all residents, most of whom also had an advanced knowledge of Turkish. The merchants could also speak Greek and Italian.

=== 19th century ===
According to Russian consul in the Manastir Vilayet, A. Rostkovski, finishing the statistical article in 1897, the total population of the sanjak was 56,105. Albanian Muslims were 51,786, Albanian Christians were 3,319, and Vlachs (Aromanians) were 1,000.

=== 20th century ===
At the beginning of the 20th century it was estimated that 15,000 people lived in Elbasan, which was then the seat of a Greek bishop. In the region between Elbasan and Berat there were numerous villages which population publicly declared themselves as Muslims, but privately practised Christianity.

Albanians who lived in Elbasan were Tosks and because of that the Sanjak of Elbasan was seen as part of Toskalik, land of Tosks, together with the sanjaks of Ergiri, Preveze, Berat, Yanya, Gorice and Manastir. Tosks did not have a tribal society like Ghegs had.
