= Pashalik of Berat =

Autonomous region of Ottoman Empire (1774 - 1809)

Pashalik of Berat Pashallëku Beratit
- 1774–1809
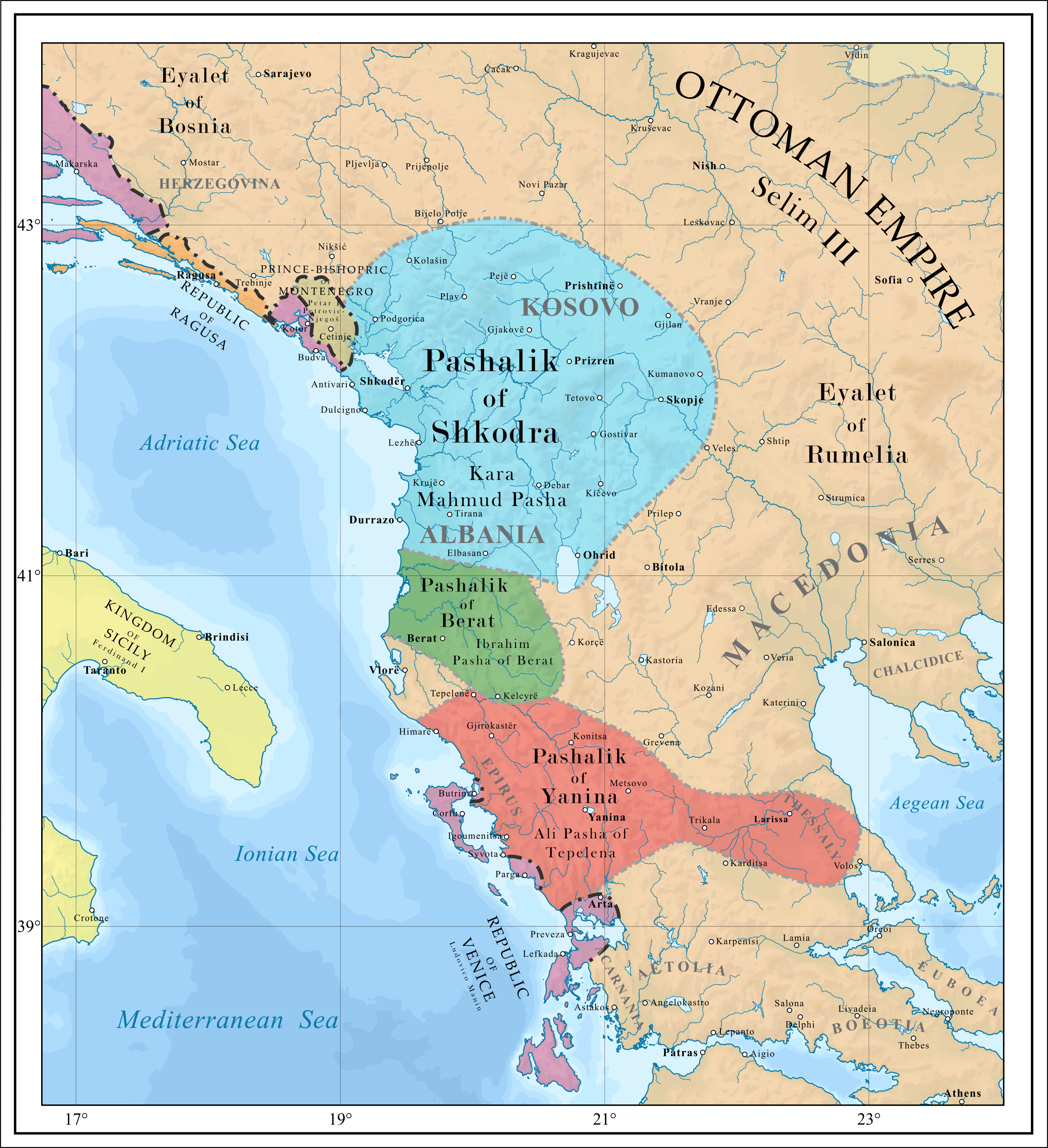
- The Albanian pashaliks in 1790-1795. The Pashalik of Berat is colored in dark green.
- Status: Autonomous pashalik of the Ottoman Empire
- Capital: Berat
- Common languages: Albanian, Ottoman Turkish
- Religion: Sunni Islam, Eastern Orthodoxy
- Government: Pashalik
- Pasha
  - 1774–1787: Ahmet Kurt Pasha
  - 1787–1809: Ibrahim Pasha of Berat
- Historical era: Early modern
  - Established: 1774
  - Disestablished: 1809
Preceded by	Succeeded by
Ottoman Empire	Pashalik of Janina
- Today part of: Albania

The Pashalik of Berat was a pashalik within the Ottoman Empire. Created in modern-day central Albania by Ahmet Kurt Pasha in 1774, it was dissolved after Ahmet's ally, Ibrahim Pasha of Berat, was defeated by Ali Pasha in 1809. Thus, the pashalik of Berat was absorbed into the Pashalik of Janina, another province within the Ottoman Empire. This pashalik was one of the three pashaliks created by Albanians in the period of the Albanian Pashaliks.

== Creation and rule of Ahmet Pasha ==
The Pashalik of Berat was created after Ahmet Kurt Pasha managed to complot with the Sublime Porte against Mehmed Pasha Bushati in 1774. For his service, the sultan gave him territories in central Albania. He managed to grow his pashalik until his death in 1787, incorporating territories of all central Albania, bordering to the north with the Pashalik of Scutari and to the south with the Pashalik of Janina. Ahmet Kurt Pasha was the grandfather of Ali Pasha, and father of Ali's mother, Hanka.

The sanjakbey of Avlona was also the Pasha of Berat until 1809.

== Conquest by Ali Pasha ==
After the death of Ahmet Kurt Pasha, the territory of the pashalik was ruled by a close ally of him, Ibrahim Pasha of Berat. As this territory belonged to the Middle Albania, Ibrahim Pasha was roused at this encroachment. This made Ali Pasha start a war with the Pashalik of Berat. After some fruitless negotiation, Ibrahim Pasha sent a body of troops under the command of his brother Sephir, bey of Avlona. Against these, Ali summoned the armatoles of Thessaly; and after villages had been burnt, peasants robbed and hanged, and flocks carried off on both sides, peace was made. Ibrahim gave his daughter in marriage to Mukhtar, the eldest son of Ali, and the disputed territory as her dower. As Sephir bey had displayed qualities which might prove formidable hereafter, Ali contrived to have him poisoned by a physician; and, after his usual fashion, he hanged the agent of the crime, that no witness might remain of it. Ali Pasha has said that he should prevail over the pasha of Berat, become vizir of Epirus, fight with the Sultan, and go to Constantinople. In 1808, Ali Pasha defeated Ibrahim Pasha, incorporating its territory in the Pashalik of Janina.

== Economy ==
Whether Mahometan or Christian the Albanians of that tract are equally independent and unruly. They pay neither capitation nor any other tax; nominally they acknowledge the authority of the Pasha of Berat; and by their bravery and their poverty they have hitherto escaped subjection to Ali of Janina. The local population and the tradesmen neither pay the kharatj nor any other tax, except a contribution of thirty paras a head per annum to Ibrahim Pasha of Berat, for the liberty of trading to his ports. The right of pasturage on the lands of the town of Himara, that of gathering velanidhi on the mountains, and that of fishing in the northern bay of Palermo are enjoyed in common by all the inhabitants. Maize is grown in the plain adjacent to the northern beach, where the two torrents, which embrace the town, overflow in the winter, and prepare the land for receiving that grain.

== Pasha ==
- Ahmet Kurt Pasha 1774-1787
- Ibrahim Pasha of Berat 1787-1809

== See also ==
- Pashalik of Scutari
- Pashalik of Janina
- Albania under the Ottoman Empire

== Sources ==
- "History of Albanian People" Albanian Academy of Science. ISBN 99927-1-623-1
