= Bushati family =

Albanian feudal and political family

The Bushati family (Albanian: Bushatllinjtë) is an Albanian Muslim family that ruled the Pashalik of Scutari from 1757 to 1831.

== Origins ==
They are descendants of the medieval Bushati tribe, a pastoralist tribe (fis) in northern Albania and Montenegro. The name Bushat is compound of mbë fshat (above the village). This is a reference to them being pastoralists that weren't permanently settled. The Bushati started to settle permanently in the 15th century and this process had been completed in the late 16th century. Their settlement includes the village of Bushat in Shkodër in the Zadrima plain from where the Bushati family came. Another part settled with the tribe of Bukumiri in the would-be territory of the Piperi tribe, where they gradually became part of the new, larger tribe in the late 16th century. In the defter of 1497 they appear as katun Bushat in Piperi with 35 households.

The Bushati family traces their origin to the Begaj brotherhood of Bushati that had converted to Islam possibly in the early 17th century. To promote their status and political goals statesmen, commanders and leaders from that family put forward different theories about their origins. Turkish traveller Evliya Çelebi in his time recorded a story about them being descendants of a Jusuf Bey Plaku, who traced his origin and status to the era of Mehmed II (r. 1444–1446, 1451–1481). In the period of the Pashalik of Shkodra, Kara Mahmud sought to expand northwards in the old lands of Ivan Crnojević of the Middle Ages. In order to legitimize and strengthen his claim, he put forward another theory that he descended from Skenderbeg Crnojević, Ivan's Muslim son.

Albanian writer Sami Frashëri asserted that the Bushati family were descendants of the Dukagjini family.

== History ==
Their dominance of the Shkodër region was gained through a network of alliances with various highland tribes. Even after the fall of the pashalik in 1831, the Bushatis continued to play an important role in Albanian society. During the 19th century, Shkodër was also known as a cultural centre and in the 1840s the Bushati library was built.

== Bushati family tree ==
Mehmed Pasha
Dervish Bey	Omer Bey
Sulejman Pasha; Vali of Rumelia, 1115 AH
Halil Pasha	Ali Bey	Hasan Pasha	Arslan Pasha	Deli Hysen Pasha	Kapudan Mehmed Bey
Mustafa Bey	Abdullah Pasha
Haxhi Sulejman Pasha	Mehmed Pasha Plaku
Mustafa Pasha Qorri	Ibrahim Pasha	Ahmed Pasha	Kara Mahmud Pasha
Mehmed Pasha died in Tirana, in 1217 AH	Mustafa Reshit Pasha
Sherif Mustafa Pasha
Mahmud Pasha	Isuf Bey	Hasan Pasha	Riza Bey
Xhelal Pasha

== List of prominent family members ==
- Süleyman Bushati, sanjak-bey of Scutari, noted for his wars against Montenegrins.
- Kara Mahmud Bushati, chief of Albanian tribe based in Shkodër, named governor of Shkodër by the Ottoman authorities.
- Ibrahim Bushati
- Mustafa Pasha Bushati
- Xhelal Pasha, Ottoman official and related to sultan Abdul Hamid II through marriage
- Petrit Bushati, Senior Albanian Diplomat, Has served as Ambassador of Albania to Sweden, USA, Serbia & Montenegro
- Maliq Bushati, Prime Minister
- Sali Bushati, former member of the Assembly of Albania
- Astrit Bushati, member of the Assembly of Albania
- Ahmet Bushati, Chairman of Municipality Council of Shkodër 1992-1996
- Xhemal Bushati, politician, former member of the Assembly of Albania, anti-Zogist activist
- Ditmir Bushati, politician and the former Minister of Foreign Affairs
- Ervin Bushati, Ambassador of Albania to the United States

== See also ==
For the village in Kosovo also sometimes called Bushati, see Komorane.

== Sources ==
- Jazexhiu, Olsi (2002). The Albanian Pashalik of Shkodra under Bushatlis 1757 – 1831. Kuala Lumpur: IIUM. Archived from the original on 2015-06-27.
- Blumi, Isa (2011). Reinstating the Ottomans: Alternative Balkan Modernities, 1800-1912. Palgrave Macmillan. ISBN 978-0-230-11908-6.
- Pllumi, Zef. Frati i Pashallarëve Bushatli të Shkodrës:(Át Erasmo Balneo):(1756-1788); kronikë e gojdhanë. Botime Françeskane, 2004.
- Stavri, N. Pashalleku i Shkodrës nën sundimin e Bushatllive në gjysmën e dytë të shekullit të XVIII, 1757–1796.(La Pachalik de Shkodër sous les Bushatli à la deuxieme moitié du XVIIIe siècle. Résumé.). 1964.
