= Ahmet Kurt Pasha =

Ahmet Kurt Pasha was an Albanian pasha and the founder and the first ruler of the Pashalik of Berat, a semi-autonomous area within the Ottoman Empire. He possibly descends from the Muzaka family, which in the late Middle Ages had founded the Lordship of Berat.

== Creation of the Pashalik ==
During the era of the Pashalik, he built the popular Gorica Bridge in the town of Berat in 1777.

== See also ==
- Ibrahim Pasha of Berat
- Ali Pasha of Yanina
- Pashalik of Berat

== Sources ==
- "History of Albanian People" Albanian Academy of Science. ISBN 99927-1-623-1

Preceded by Post created	Pasha of Berat; 1774–1787	Succeeded by Ibrahim Pasha of Berat
