= Third Scutari-Ottoman War =

Conflict between the Pashalik of Scutari and the Ottoman Empire

Third Scutari-Ottoman War Lufta e Tretë Shkodrano-Otomane
- Part of History of Albania and Ottoman wars in Europe
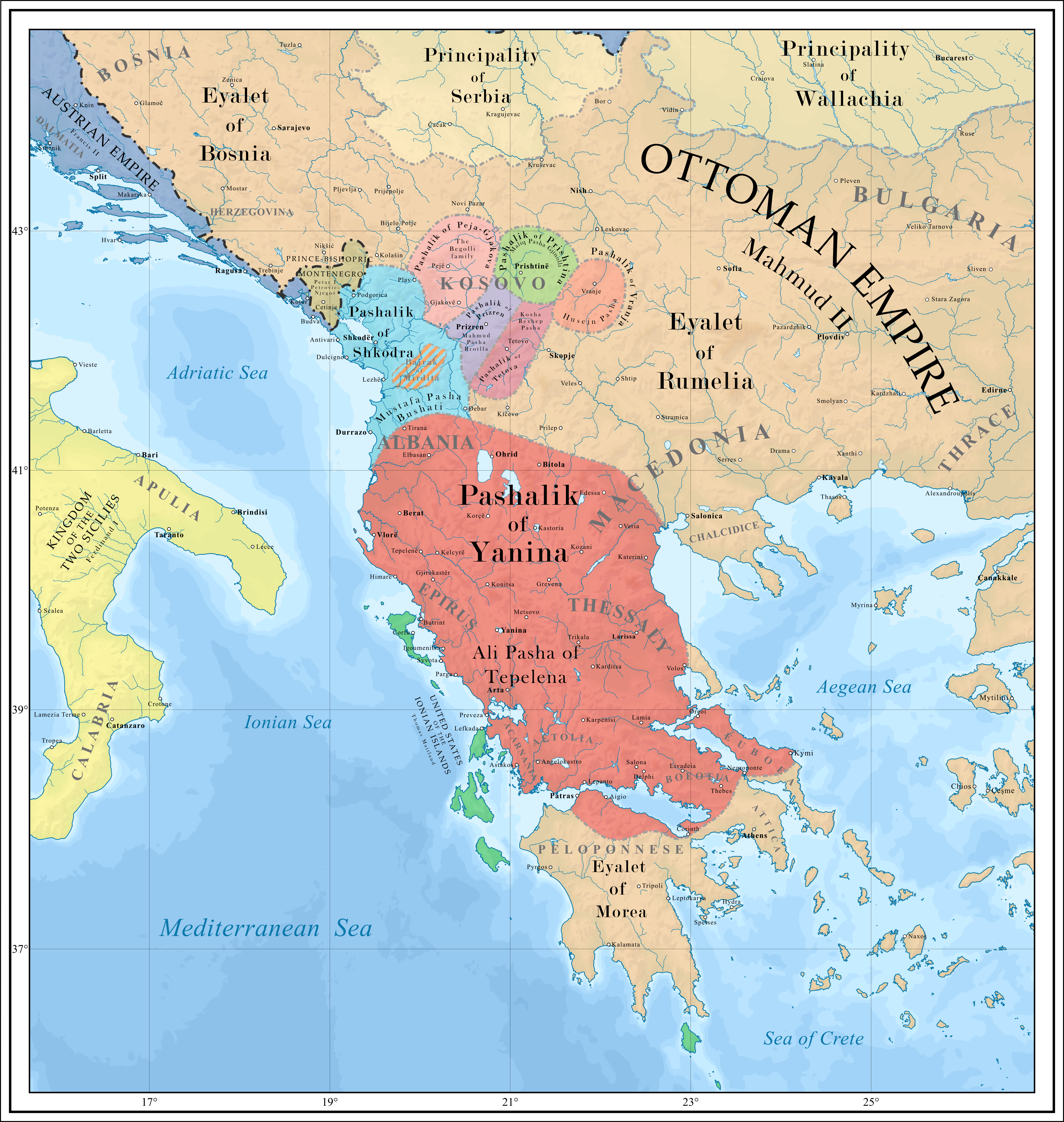
- Albanian Pashaliks in 1821
Date	14 September 1829 – 10 November 1831
Location	Balkan
Result	Ottoman victory
Territorial changes	Dissolution of the Pashalik of Scutari

Belligerents
Pashalik of Scutari; Pashalik of Priştine (until 1831); Pashalik of Prizren (until 1831); Pashalik of Üsküp (until 1831); Pashalik of Vranje (until 1831); Pashalik of Leskovac (until 1831); Bajrak of Mirdita; Southern Albanian rebels (annihilated in 1830); Bosnian ayans (until July 1831); Political Support: Principality of Serbia; Eyalet of Egypt	Ottoman Empire; Pashalik of İpek; Pashalik of Priştine (from 1831); Pashalik of Prizren (from 1831); Pashalik of Üsküp (from 1831); Pashalik of Vranje (from 1831); Pashalik of Leskovac (from 1831)

Commanders and leaders
Mustafa Pasha Bushatli; Yashar Pasha Gjinolli of Priştine (until 1831); Mahmud Pasha Rrotulla of Prizren (until 1831); Hysen Pasha of Vranje (until 1831); Hevzi Pasha of Üsküp (until 1831); Ismail Pasha of Leskovac (until 1831); Llesh i Zi of Mirdita; Ndue Lleshi of Mirdita; Sefedin Pasha of Gjakova †; Kara Fejza of Gjakova †; Husein Gradaščević (until July 1831); Political Support: Miloš Obrenović; Muhammad Ali Pasha	(Ottoman Empire) Mahmud II; Reşid Mehmed Pasha (WIA); Numan Pasha Begolli of İpek; Yashar Pasha Gjinolli of Priştine (from 1831); Mahmud Pasha Rrotulla of Prizren (from 1831); Hysen Pasha of Vranje (from 1831); Hevzi Pasha of Üsküp (from 1831); Ismail Pasha of Leskovac (from 1831)

Strength
40,000 (peak)	16,000 (peak)

Casualties and losses
10,000 killed	5,000 killed

The Third Scutari-Ottoman War (Albanian: Lufta e Tretë Shkodrano-Otomane; Turkish: Üçüncü İşkodra-Osmanlı Savaşı) was a war fought between 1830 and 1831 between the Ottoman Empire and primarily the Pashalik of Scutari. The war marked the final confrontation between Scutari and the Sublime Porte, resulting in the dissolution of the Pashalik of Scutari and the end of Bushati rule over most of northern Albania.

== Background ==
After the destruction of the Pashalik of Yanina and the execution of Ali Pasha Tepelena, Sultan Mahmud II had no incentive to allow Mustafa Pasha Bushatli to grow stronger. For his part, Mustafa Pasha grew increasingly alarmed by the Ottoman governors’ clear objective of centralizing imperial authority at the expense of the feudal rulers’ autonomy. Tensions between them began to worsen in 1824, when Bushatli returned from Greece to Shkodra without the Sultan's permission. However, with the Sublime Porte preoccupied by the Greek War of Independence and the Janissary question, direct action against Scutari was postponed.

In 1826, Mustafa Pasha Bushatli, who aimed at greater independence from the Ottomans, sought to annex the Pashalik of Peja from Numan Pasha Begolli, an Albanian Pasha loyal to the Ottomans. His 1827 campaign failed despite a strong army, so in 1828 he launched a larger war that drew Ottoman attention. Mustafa allied with Mahmud Pasha Rrotulla of Prizren, Gusinje’s Muslims, Gül bey of Bijelo Polje, Suleiman Aga Kučević, and Hysen Hoti of Pešter. The Begollis, meanwhile, were supported by the Kelmendi tribe, inahbitands of Rožaje, and Yashar Pasha Gjinolli of Prishtina. The Russo-Turkish War of 1828–1829 briefly halted the Bushati–Begolli conflict, but fighting resumed in spring 1829. After Numan Pasha of Peja died, Mustafa Pasha Bushatli, under the pretext of raising troops for the Russian front, attacked and swiftly seized all of Dukagjin. Only in May, after annexing the Pashalik of Peja he joined forces with the Ottomans against the Russians, marching with his large Albanian army to the Danube (Vidin, Oryahovo), Sofia, and Philippopolis, though without real combat. These actions were likely driven by Mustafa Pasha Bushatli’s secret agreement with the Russians, who had promised to recognize him as the independent ruler of Albania. Nevertheless, the Sublime Porte accepted his actions, formally recognizing his annexation of the Pashalik of Peja and further rewarding him with control over the Sanjaks of Ohrid, Debar, and Elbasan.

The Ottoman Empire was significantly weakened by the Greek War of Independence (1821–1829) and the Russo-Turkish War (1828–1829). In response, Sultan Mahmud II initiated a series of military and social reforms aimed at strengthening central authority and modernizing the state along European lines. The abolition of the Spahi system and the Janissaries marked the beginning of these reforms, with the ultimate aim of transforming the Ottoman Empire from a centralized theocracy into a constitutional monarchy.

Meanwhile, in 1829, Mustafa Pasha Bushatli, the southern Albanian beys, and the Bosnian ayans under Husein Gradaščević—all of whom had supported the Ottomans in the war against Russia—were angered by the new reforms of Mahmud II and the Treaty of Adrianople (September 14, 1829). The treaty granted sovereignty to Serbia and ceded Bosnian territory, provoking discontent. Mustafa Pasha Bushatli rebelled against the settlement.

== War ==
=== Albanian and Bosnian advances ===
In 1830, Mustafa Pasha Bushatli urged the southern Albanian beys to join his war against Sultan Mahmud II. Determined to end their defiance, the Sultan dispatched Grand Vizier Reşid Mehmed Pasha to suppress them. This move, however, briefly united the three most powerful beys of southern Albania against the Ottoman state. In June, Reşid Mehmed Pasha proclaimed an amnesty and invited the Albanian chiefs to negotiate. Around 500 men, including chiefs and their followers, attended. He assured them their demands—such as higher pay and the reversal of reforms—would be met, and on August 26, 1830, invited 246 of them to a banquet. Instead of reconciliation, they were ambushed by 1,000 Ottoman regulars, and most were slaughtered in what became known as the Manastir massacre. Two of the leading rebels, Veli Bey of Yannina and Arslan Bey, were killed along with several lesser beys. Only Zylyftar Poda survived, continuing resistance in Ioannina. Reşid Mehmed Pasha then marched against him with 16,000 troops, forcing Zylyftar to flee. With his defeat, southern Albania fell back under Ottoman control.

In early 1831, the Sublime Porte ordered Mustafa Pasha Bushatli to surrender the sanjaks of Dukagjin, Ohrid, Elbasan, Trgovište, and Debra to the forces of Reşid Mehmed Pasha. In response, Mustafa Pasha Bushatli convened a gathering of tribal chiefs and ulama in Shkodra on 4 January 1831. Many Muslims in the Balkans grew dissatisfied with the new Ottoman reforms, which they felt undermined Sharia law. The assembled Albanian leaders and Islamic scholars declared that the proposed measures violated Islam and Sharia. Those present swore the besa to resist by force if Ottoman authorities attempted to implement the reforms. In a special proclamation, Mustafa Pasha called on Muslims to take up jihad and march on Constantinople to depose the Sultan, whom the opponents of the reforms publicly denounced as an infidel (Kāfir). The loss of these territories would have dealt a severe political and economic blow to the Pashalik of Scutari. Refusing to comply, Mustafa Pasha Bushatli, with financial and moral backing from Serbian prince Miloš Obrenović, began raising an army in March 1831. Under the cover of a Pan-Islamic alliance, he was soon joined by other Albanian pashas from North Albania, including Yashar Pasha Gjinolli of the Pashalik of Prishtina, Mahmud Pasha Rrotulla of the Pashalik of Prizren, Hysen Pasha of the Pashalik of Vranje, Ismail Pasha of Leskovac, local Albanian Pashas from Niš and Tetovo, Kara Fejza, Sefedin Pasha of Gjakova, as well as Husein Gradaščević and his Bosniak rebels. Mustafa Pasha Bushatli also received financial support from Muhammad Ali Pasha of Egypt.

Husein Gradaščević soon issued a call for volunteers and raised a force of 4,000 men, which marched toward the unofficial Bosnian capital of Travnik on March 29, 1831. On April 7, near the town of Pirot, his rebels defeated an Ottoman force of 2,000 soldiers.

In the meantime, Mustafa Pasha Bushatli's army quickly grew to around 40,000 men, extending its control over vast parts of the Balkans. He divided his forces into three groups. One contingent, numbering 8,000 men, under Kara Fejza and Sefedin Pasha of Gjakova, was sent to capture Sofia, as Bushatli feared an Ottoman strike from the east. They succeeded, defeating the Ottoman garrison and occupying the Sanjak of Sofia, which was thoroughly plundered during their control. Kara Fejza's son, Ali Bey, advanced further, seizing nearby towns such as Breznik and Tran, where he became notorious for his harsh persecution of the local Christian Bulgarian population.

Another division of Mustafa Pasha's army was entrusted to Hysen Hoti, who successfully captured the city of Veles. Meanwhile, Mustafa Pasha himself, together with several allied pashas, completed preparations in Albania and gathered in Prizren on May 19. There, they were joined by Albanian pashas from Kosovo as well as the rulers of the Sanjak of Niš, including those of Niš, Vranje, and Leskovac. United, their forces advanced on Skopje and captured the city.

Bushatli's followers seized control of the Sanjaks of Sofia, Samokov, Dupnitsa, Veles, Kyustendil, and Dibra, effectively undermining the Sultan's authority across much of western Rumelia. However, despite the vast territory under their control, the movement suffered from poor organization and the questionable loyalty of several Albanian pashas, some of whom secretly maintained ties with the Sublime Porte. The separatist and anti-reform movement of Mustafa Pasha Bushatli, though initially successful, quickly began to weaken. Although his army was large, its fighting strength was limited: drawn from various regions, the troops were undisciplined, poorly organized, and inadequately armed.

=== Ottoman Counteroffensive ===
Alarmed by the developments, the Sublime Porte dispatched an army under the command of Reşid Mehmed Pasha. He soon encountered Mustafa Pasha Bushatli's forces near Florina and defeated them. Following this victory, Ottoman troops quickly regained lost ground, retaking Bitola, where many of Bushatli's allies were captured and executed. The imperial army also advanced successfully in Albania, recapturing Dibra, Elbasan, Durrës, Tirana, and Kavaja. In response, Mustafa Pasha Bushatli assembled his forces and marched toward Bitola to confront Reşid Mehmed Pasha. Although Mustafa Pasha Bushati had planned to unite his men with Husein Gradaščević, who himself had gathered 20,000 men, and march together against the Ottomans in July.

==== Battle of Babune ====
Upon learning of Bushatli's movements, Reşid Mehmed Pasha departed from Ioannina and quickly advanced with his troops to confront the rebels. The decisive battle took place on 21 April in the mountain gorges of Babuna near Prilep, where the Ottoman army clashed with Bushatli's 40,000-strong force. At first, the Albanians appeared poised for victory, but the defection of more than half of Mustafa Pasha's troops turned the tide, securing a decisive Ottoman triumph. The defeat was devastating: several thousand of Bushatli's men were killed or wounded, and over 14,000 were captured. Mustafa Pasha Bushatli managed to escape with only a small group of followers, primarily his Mirditor allies under the leadership of Llesh i Zi, the bajraktar of Mirdita. Passing through Skopje, he reached Prizren and made an unsuccessful attempt to raise a new army. Forced to retreat, he withdrew to Shkodra and entrenched himself in Rozafa Castle. A key factor in this disastrous defeat was the betrayal of Hevzi Pasha of Skopje, who abandoned Bushatli and his Albanian allies at the most critical moment.

Following the defeat at Babuna, most of Mustafa Pasha Bushatli’s former allies abandoned him and secured pardons from the Ottomans. Among them was Jashar Pasha Gjinolli of Prishtina, who was restored to his territories and even joined Reşid Mehmed Pasha’s army. Mustafa Pasha Bushatli was likewise deserted by the pashas of Niš, Leskovac, and Vranje; Ibrahim Pasha of Leskovac went so far as to aid the Ottomans in reestablishing control over Niš.

==== Ottoman offensive in Bulgaria ====
At the same time, the Pasha of Edirne advanced with his nizam troops toward Sofia to confront Bushatli's forces in western Bulgaria. The Ottoman army pressed forward, first clashing with the troops of Kara Fejza and Sefedin Pasha of Gjakova near Plovdiv, where the rebels were pushed back. Soon after, the Ottomans completely routed them on the road to Sofia.

==== Siege of Shkodra and the Battle of Shtime ====
Soon after the defeat at Babuna, Mustafa Pasha Bushati entrenched himself in the Rozafa Castle of Shkodra, which was soon besieged by Ottoman forces.

Meanwhile, Bosnian forces under Husein Gradaščević marched into Kosovo to confront the Ottoman army led by Reshid Pasha. The two armies clashed on July 18, 1831, near Shtimje, where Gradaščević's troops ambushed the imperial vanguard commanded by Qorr Ibrahim Pasha, inflicting a decisive defeat. Ibrahim Pasha was killed, several Ottoman commanders were wounded, and about 2,000 soldiers were captured. The Bosnians seized cannons, weapons, and supplies, while Reşid Mehmed Pasha himself was severely wounded. Instead of advancing to relieve the siege of Shkodra, the Bosnians halted for negotiations. When Reshid Pasha accepted their main demands—halting reforms in Bosnia and recognizing Gradaščević as Vizier of Bosnia—they withdrew from Kosovo on August 10, 1831, leaving Mustafa Pasha Bushati isolated. During the campaign, several Albanian pashas from Leskovac, Vranje, and parts of Kosovo temporarily joined Gradaščević's movement.

The Muslims and Catholics of the Sanjak of Shkodra remained united and loyal to Mustafa Pasha for six months during the siege, until Mustafa Pasha Bushatli secretly contacted the Ottoman army to offer his surrender. The offer was accepted, and the Sultan spared his life. Mustafa Pasha officially surrendered and capitulated on November 10, 1831. The people of Mirdita, confined within the castle, were commanded by Ndue Lleshi, the second son of Llesh i Zi, together with his cousin Preng Mar Kola, who was killed while fighting in the fortress.

After Mustafa Pasha's surrender, Ndue Lleshi and the Mirditors found themselves helpless — their only options were to surrender or die within the castle walls. Following a historic resistance, Ndue Lleshi informed Reşid Mehmed Pasha that he would abandon the castle, but only on the condition that his men retain the honor of the weapons, meaning they would depart with their rifles slung over their shoulders. At first, Reşid Mehmed Pasha hesitated, but realizing that the Mirditors would rather die than surrender dishonorably, he ultimately accepted their request.

== Aftermath ==
The surrender and capitulation of Mustafa Pasha Bushati brought an end to the Pashalik of Scutari. Soon afterward, however, Reşid Mehmed Pasha marched against the Bosniaks to suppress their uprising under Husein Gradaščević, despite having previously accepted their demands after the Battle of Shtime. In 1832, after the suppression of the uprising, Miloš Obrenović, who had previously provided financial support to Mustafa Pasha Bushati and had been his ally, infuriated by the defeat of Mustafa Pasha Bushati, ordered that every Albanian in Serbia be beaten for failing to fight for their freedom alongside Bushatli. He also decreed the expulsion of Muslims, who were predominantly Albanians. During the uprising, Mustafa Pasha Bushatli had offered the Sanjak of Niš to Serbia in exchange for its participation in the war, but that support never materialized.

After breaking the power of the separatist feudal lords in Albania, the Sublime Porte did not restore the decaying timar system, which by then had fallen into disuse throughout the Ottoman Empire. Instead, in 1832, it officially abolished the system through a legislative act, marking the formal end of the military-feudal regime that had been established in Albania four centuries earlier. In place of the military-feudal administration, Istanbul began introducing a regular state bureaucracy in Albania. However, this new administration quickly provoked opposition from the surviving Albanian feudal rulers, who had escaped Reşid Mehmed Pasha’s campaigns of extermination and now viewed these reforms as the final blow to their independent power. Meanwhile, many of the new officials appointed to key administrative posts engaged in corruption and speculation, deepening popular resentment. As a result, shortly after the establishment of the Ottoman state administration, a series of peasant uprisings erupted across Albania. These revolts were led by local chieftains such as Zylyftar Poda, Tafil Buzi, and Zenel Gjoleka, as well as by urban citizens under the leadership of esnaf-affiliated figures like Hamza Kazazi and Haxhi Idrizi. All of these rebellions, however, were eventually suppressed. Meanwhile in Kosovo and Macedonia, rebels allied to the Bushatis, achieved significant successes against the Gjinolli family and Hevzi Pasha of Skopje. During these uprisings in Llap and Gollak, Albanian rebels allied with Mustafa Pasha Bushati managed to defeat a large army led by Yashar Pasha Gjinolli in 1832. Meanwhile in Karadak, following news of the betrayal of Hevzi Pasha, more than 4,000 Albanian Muslim rebels—also allied with Mustafa Pasha Bushati—invaded the Kumanovo region, where they killed, slaughtered, and plundered Christian settlements, forcing thousands of Slavic Christians to flee. Hevzi Pasha of Skopje barely managed to drive the rebels out of the area, and it took considerable effort to fully subdue them.

Mustafa Pasha Bushati was later reinstated as an Ottoman official and served as governor of the Ankara Eyalet, the Herzegovina Eyalet, and Medina, positions he held until his death in 1860.

== See also ==
- Pashalik of Scutari
- Ottoman Empire
- Mahmud II
- History of Albania
- Shkodër
