= Dushkarak =

- Village
- Location within Albania
- Coordinates: 40°26′N 19°44′E
- Country: Albania
- County: Vlorë
- Municipality: Selenicë
- Administrative unit: Sevaster
- Time zone: UTC+1 (CET)
  - Summer (DST): UTC+2 (CEST)

Dushkarak is a populated place in the Selenicë municipality of the Vlorë County of Albania. It was part of the former municipality Sevaster. At the 2015 local government reform it became part of the municipality Selenicë.
