= Karbunarë, Vlorë =

Karbunarë
- Village
- Location within Albania
- Coordinates: 40°31′5″N 19°42′10″E
- Country: Albania
- County: Vlorë
- Municipality: Selenicë
- Administrative unit: Armen
- Time zone: UTC+1 (CET)
  - Summer (DST): UTC+2 (CEST)

Karbunarë is a village in the Vlore County in Southern Albania. At the 2015 local government reform it became part of the municipality Selenicë. It is part of the municipal unit of Armen. Its geographic coordinates are latitude 40.518 and longitude 19.703. It lies on the left bank of the river Vjosë that defines the border between Fier County and Vlorë County.
