= Kocul =

- Village
- Location within Albania
- Coordinates: 40°28′40″N 19°39′26″E
- Country: Albania
- County: Vlorë
- Municipality: Selenicë
- Administrative unit: Vllahinë
- Elevation: 572 m (1,877 ft)

Population (2011)
  - Total: 3,702
- Time zone: UTC+1 (CET)
  - Summer (DST): UTC+2 (CEST)
- Website: koculi.org

Kocul is a village in the Vlorë County in southern Albania. It was part of the former municipality of Vllahinë. At the 2015 local government reform it became part of the municipality Selenicë. The population of Kocul in 2011 census was 3,702.

Kocul is the birthplace two members of the National Committee for the liberation of Vlora (1920), Duro Shaska and Qazim Koculi.
