= Matogjin =

- Village
- Location within Albania
- Coordinates: 40°18′38″N 19°43′44″E
- Country: Albania
- County: Vlorë
- Municipality: Selenicë
- Administrative unit: Brataj
- Time zone: UTC+1 (CET)
  - Summer (DST): UTC+2 (CEST)

Matogjin is a village in Vlorë County, southern Albania. At the 2015 local government reform it became part of the municipality Selenicë.

== Notable people ==
Matogjin is the birthplace of Demir Vlonjati and Qazim Ademi, famous singers and composers of the Albanian polyphonic music.
