= Vërmik =

Village in Albania

- Village
- Interactive map of Vërmik
- Coordinates: 40°17′50″N 19°47′21″E
- Country: Albania
- County: Vlorë
- Municipality: Selenicë
- Administrative unit: Brataj
- Elevation: 611 m (2,005 ft)
- Demonym(s): Vërmikas; Vërmiqot
- Time zone: UTC+1 (CET)
  - Summer (DST): UTC+2 (CEST)
- Postal code: 9403

Vërmik (also spelled Vërmiku) is a village located in the Brataj administrative unit, part of the Selenicë Municipality in Vlorë County, Albania. It is situated approximately 40°17′50″N latitude and 19°47′21″E longitude, at an elevation of 611 meters (2,005 feet) above sea level.

== Administrative context ==
Vërmik is part of the Brataj administrative unit, which is within the Selenicë Municipality. This administrative structure was established under Law No. 115/2014, which reorganized local government units across Albania.

== Geography ==
The village is located in a hilly area, approximately 3.7 kilometers from the center of the city of Vlorë. The surrounding region is characterized by an average hilly terrain.
