= Gernec =

Gërnec
- Village
- Location within Albania
- Coordinates: 40°26′38″N 19°40′7″E
- Country: Albania
- County: Vlorë
- Municipality: Selenicë
- Administrative unit: Vllahinë
- Elevation: 200 m (660 ft)
- Time zone: UTC+1 (CET)
  - Summer (DST): UTC+2 (CEST)

Gernec is a village in the Vlorë County in southern Albania. It was part of the former municipality of Vllahinë. At the 2015 local government reform, it became part of Selenicë.
