= Golimbas =

- Village
- Location within Albania
- Coordinates: 40°23′52″N 19°44′15″E
- Country: Albania
- County: Vlorë
- Municipality: Selenicë
- Administrative unit: Sevaster
- Time zone: UTC+1 (CET)
  - Summer (DST): UTC+2 (CEST)

Golimbas (also known as Kolimbas, Golimbasi, Goljimbas, or Rashaj) is a populated place in the Vlorë County of Albania. It was part of the former municipality Sevaster. At the 2015 local government reform it became part of the municipality Selenicë.
