= Vllahinë =

- Administrative unit
- Location within Albania
- Coordinates: 40°27′N 19°39′E
- Country: Albania
- County: Vlorë
- Municipality: Selenicë

Population (2011)
  - Administrative unit: 3,111
- Time zone: UTC+1 (CET)
  - Summer (DST): UTC+2 (CEST)

Vllahinë is a village and a former municipality in the Vlorë County, southwestern Albania. At the 2015 local government reform it became a subdivision of the municipality Selenicë. The population at the 2011 census was 3,111. The municipal unit consists of the villages Vllahinë, Kocul, Mërtiraj, Rexhepaj, Hadëraj, Mallkeq, Gërnec, Petë, Kropisht, Vezhdanisht, Peshkëpi and Penkovë.
