= Brataj =

- Administrative unit
- Location within Albania
- Coordinates: 40°16′N 19°40′E
- Country: Albania
- County: Vlorë
- Municipality: Selenicë

Population (2011)
  - Administrative unit: 2,849
- Time zone: UTC+1 (CET)
  - Summer (DST): UTC+2 (CEST)

Brataj is a village and a former municipality in the Vlorë County, southwestern Albania. At the 2015 local government reform it became a subdivision of the municipality Selenicë. The population at the 2011 census was 2,849. The municipal unit consists of the villages Brataj, Lepenicë, Gjorm, Velçë, Ramicë, Mesaplik, Matogjin, Bashaj, Vërmik and Malas.

== History ==
The etymology of Brataj may come from the Slavic word for brother “brat”, if this is the case the place name would’ve appeared during one of the time periods the Slavs invaded/ ruled over Albania in history. In June 1847 Albanian representatives from Lalëria, Toskëria, Labëria and Çamëria met in the village of Mesaplik reacting to the reforms of the Ottoman Empire (Tanzimat). The event known in Albanian as Kuvendimi I Mesaplikut, highlighted that Albanians – Christians or Muslims – are one and undivided, calling on all without exception to go to war against the Ottoman Empire. The assembly also declared that no taxes would be paid, that Albanians would not send any more soldiers to the Ottoman Empire, and that the new administration would not be accepted. This event led to the Albanian Revolt of 1847. In 1943 the Italian forces of the area were defeated in the Battle of Gjorm by Balli Kombetar and their Colonel Franco Clementi was killed.

== Notable people ==
- Ahmet Myftar, 6th Dedebaba of the Bektashi Order
