= Armen, Albania =

Armen
- Administrative unit
- Location within Albania
- Coordinates: 40°32′N 19°36′E
- Country: Albania
- County: Vlorë
- Municipality: Selenicë

Population (2011)
  - Administrative unit: 2,965
- Time zone: UTC+1 (CET)
  - Summer (DST): UTC+2 (CEST)

Armen is a village and a former municipality in the Vlorë County, southwestern Albania. At the 2015 local government reform it became a subdivision of the municipality Selenicë. The population at the 2011 census was 2,965. The municipal unit consists of the villages Armen, Karbunarë, Rromës, Treblovë, Lubonjë, Picar and Mesarak.
