= Sevaster =

- Administrative unit
- Location within Albania
- Coordinates: 40°24′N 19°44′E
- Country: Albania
- County: Vlorë
- Municipality: Selenicë

Population (2011)
  - Administrative unit: 1,720
- Time zone: UTC+1 (CET)
  - Summer (DST): UTC+2 (CEST)

Sevaster is a village and a former municipality in the Vlorë County, southwestern Albania. At the 2015 local government reform it became a subdivision of the municipality Selenicë. The population at the 2011 census was 1,720. The municipal unit consists of the villages Sevaster, Golimbas, Dushkarak, Shkozë, Mazhar, Ploçë, Lezhan and Amonicë.
