= Qazim Koculi =

Albanian politician (1887–1943)

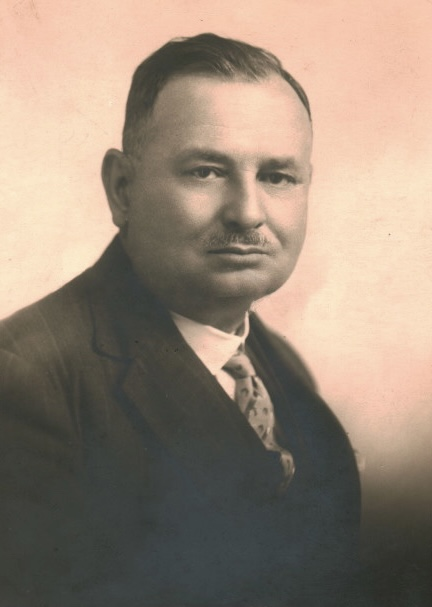

Prime Minister of Albania (acting)
- In office December 6, 1921 – December 7, 1921
- Monarch: Wilhelm I
- Preceded by: Pandeli Evangjeli
- Succeeded by: Hasan Prishtina

Personal details
- Born: August 22, 1887 Kocul, Sanjak of Avlona, Ottoman Albania
- Died: January 2, 1943 (aged 55) Vlorë, Albanian Kingdom
- Cause of death: Assassinated
- Parent: Muhamet Koçiu (Father)
- Profession: military commander, Politician
- Awards: Hero of the People

Military service
- Allegiance: Ottoman Empire; Principality of Albania
- Branch/service: Ottoman Navy
- Years of service: until 1909, 1920
- Rank: First Lieutenant
- Battles/wars: Battle of Vlora

Qazim Koculi (August 22, 1887 – January 2, 1943) was an Albanian politician of the early 20th century and one-day acting Prime Minister of Albania. He was also the principal military commander of the Albanian forces during the Vlora War in 1920. He was honored by the president with the title "Kalorës i Urdhërit të Skënderbeut" ("Knight of the Order of Skanderbeg") in August 2020.

== Early life ==
Qazim Koculi was born in 1887 in the village of Koculi, close to Vlorë (in the then Ottoman Empire, now modern Albania) to Muhamet Koçiu. With the help of Syrja bey Vlora, Koculi received his primary education in Vlorë and later moved to Ioannina, today's Greece to attend the well-known Zosimea Gymnasium. He accomplished his higher education at the Kara Harp Okulu Turkish Military Academy, graduating as a Teğmen (Second Lieutenant). He was appointed to the Ottoman Navy as a Üsteğmen (First Lieutenant).

He disobeyed a military order in 1909 during a naval battle in Preveza by refusing to surrender to the Italian Navy. After a warrant for his arrest was issued by the Imperial Command, Koculi fled to Argentina, where he resided until 1912.

He then returned to Vlorë upon the invitation of President Ismail Qemali. The latter appointed him Director of the Port of Vlorë, a position he held until the takeover of the port by the Italians in October 1914. He withdrew to Brataj, Vlorë and served as a village chief until 1917. He later served as vice prefect of Tepelenë until 1919.

== Vlora War and politics ==
Koculi represented Vlorë in the Congress of Lushnjë, a constituent assembly held in January 1920, and was hence appointed member of parliament. He was also Prefect of Vlorë on May 29, 1920. At the same time he was appointed commander-in-chief of the Vlora War Committee. Koculi led his army against the Italian forces in the Vlora war, at the end of which, on September 3, 1920, he entered the city and took back the duties of the Vlorë prefecture.

Upon the establishment of a democratic government by the Congress of Lushnjë, the first elections for the national legislature were held on April 5, 1921, Koculi won the Vlorë district.

Koculi was Minister of Public Works in the Government of Fan Noli by pursuing a policy of opposition to King Zogu. He was one of the founders of KONARE in Vienna in 1925.

With the Italian invasion of Albania of 1939, Koculi returned to Albania. He was one of the Ministers of State during the government of Mustafa Kruja, and was delegated High commissioner in Vlorë, being so the direct governmental authority in the district. After the Battle of Gjorm, Koculi was murdered in Vlorë by the militia led by Halil Alia.

Political offices
Preceded by Pandeli Evangjeli	Prime Minister of Albania (acting); December 6, 1921 – December 7, 1921	Succeeded by Hasan Prishtina
