= Demir Vlonjati =

Albanian folk singer, composer and poet

Demir Vlonjati (c. 1780–1845) born Demir Mystehaku and also known as Demir Aga Vlonjakasi was an Albanian folk singer, composer and poet.

Demir Mystehaku was born in Matogjin, southern Albania around 1780 and died there in 1845. He became a famous singer and created a new genre of Albanian polyphonic music named demirçe after him. This genre influenced the works of another famous composer from the same region, Qazim Ademi. In 1845 he wrote an octosyllabic poem in nineteen quatrains condemning a massacre in Vlorë region committed by Ottoman Turkish forces that year and the negative effects of the Tanzimat on Albania.
