= Mustafa Pasha Bushatli =

Ottoman-Albanian governor of Scutari from 1810 to 1831

- Born: 1797; Scutari, Pashalik of Scutari, Ottoman Empire (modern Shkodër Albania)
- Died: May 27, 1860 (aged 62/63); Medina, Habesh Eyalet, Ottoman Empire (modern Saudi Arabia)
- Relatives: Kara Mahmud Bushatli (Father)
- Military career
- Allegiance: Ottoman Empire
- Active: 1810–60

Mustafa Pasha Bushatli (Turkish: Büşatlı Mustafa Paşa, 1797 – May 27, 1860), called Ishkodrali ("from Scutari"), was a semi-independent Ottoman statesman, the last hereditary governor of the Pashalik of Scutari. In 1810 he succeeded Ibrahim Bushati and ruled Shkodër until 1831.

== History ==
Mustafa was the son of the powerful Kara Mahmud Bushatli. He succeeded his uncle, Ibrahim Pasha in c. 1810 and received the rank of Vizier in 1812 and continued to rule the Pashalik of Shkodra as an independent ruler.

In 1820, the sanjak of Berat was appropriated to him.

Mustafa led a mercenary army in the early stages of the Greek War of Independence. In 1823 a campaign of 8,000 Albanian troops (according to Finlay), in Western Greece was led by Mustafa Pasha and Omer Vrioni; On August 24, 1823, Markos Botsaris and 350 Souliotes attacked the army of Mustafa Pasha near Karpenisi, attempting to stop the Ottoman advance. The battle ended in Ottoman defeat, and Botsaris was killed in action.

In 1824 the sanjaks of Ohrid and Elbasan were appropriated to him, and he received the title of serasker.

As his father, Mustafa aimed at greater independence, and when Mahmud II's Ottoman military reform efforts threatened to deprive him of his hereditary rights and privileges, he became hostile to the sultan and maintained friendly relations with Serbian Prince Miloš Obrenović, the discontented Bosniaks and Muhammad Ali of Egypt. Thus, he was passive in the early stage of the Russo-Turkish War (1828–29), only in May 1829 he appeared with his Albanians on the Danube (Vidin, Rahovo), then continued to Sofia and Philippopolis, without taking active part in the fighting.

Informed in 1831 that his rule had been termed, Mustafa Pasha gathered an Albanian Muslim alliance against the Ottomans and he invited the Serbs to fight in return for Nis.

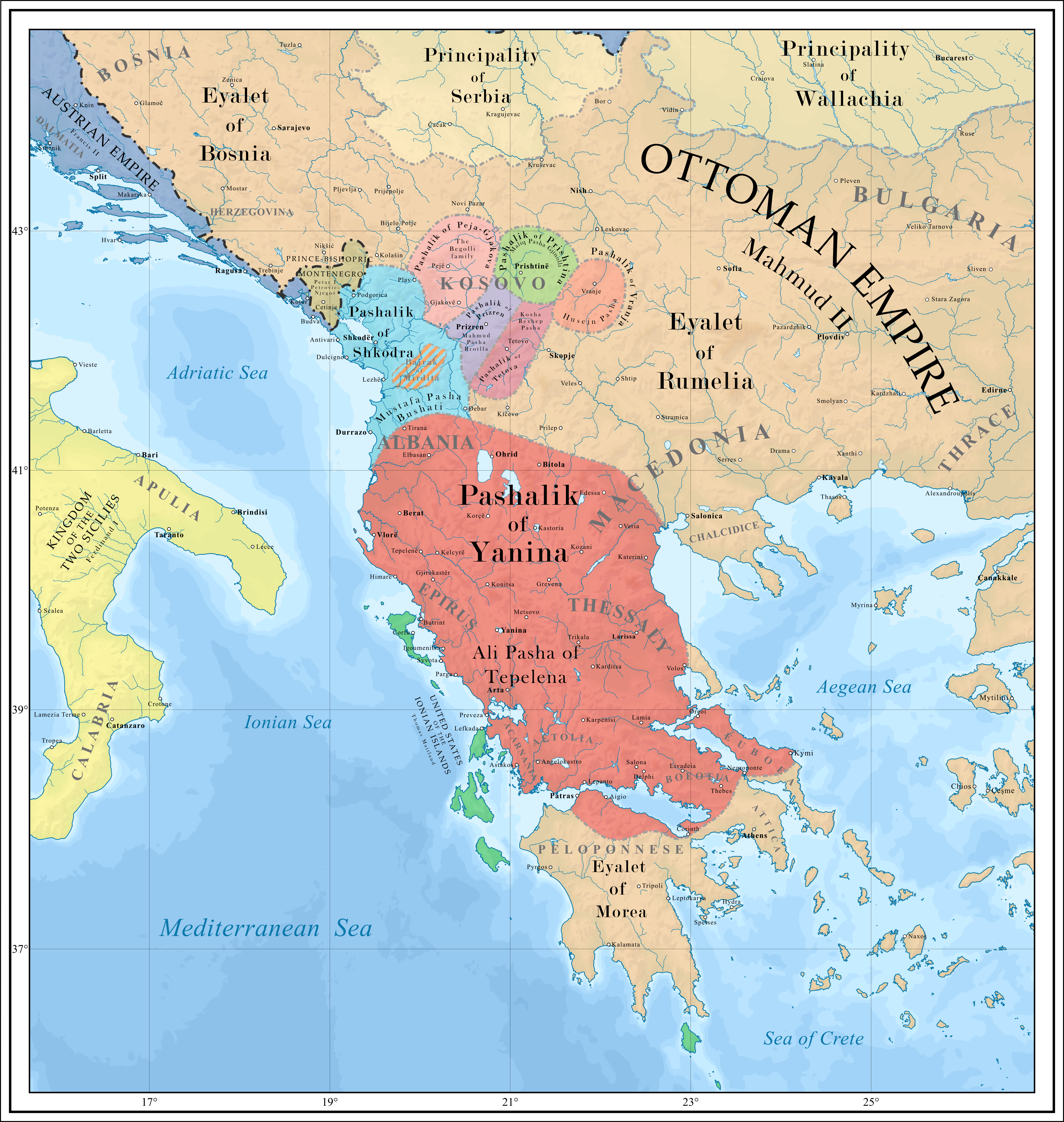
Pashalik of Shkodra under the rule of Mustafa Pasha.

With the conclusion of peace, the Porte, in 1831, demanded that Mustafa hand over the districts of Dukakin, Debar, Elbasan, Ohrid and Trgovište to Grand Vizier Reşid Mehmed Pasha, and to implement certain reforms in Scutari. Mustafa resisted, and with the financial and moral support of Prince Miloš, he led an army against the Grand Vizier in mid-March 1831. He was joined by other pashas of northern Albania and Kosovo who objected the reforms. The rebels had some success, including occupying Sofia, but they were routed at Skopje by the Grand Vizier's regular troops in the beginning of May 1831. Mustafa retreated via Skoplje and Prizren and fortified himself in Scutari. After a six-month long siege, he surrendered on 10 November 1831. On Metternich's petition, he was pardoned and taken to Constantinople.

After 15 years, he was again a governor, in the Ankara Eyalet (from 1846).

Next, he was appointed the governor of the Herzegovina Eyalet, and appeared on May 22, 1853. According to Serbian sources, he was fair, and if someone wronged, he could let it pass. During his office, the hajduk bands multiplied to the extent that he was afraid that he would be captured in the night in Mostar and killed.

His last office was in Medina where he died on May 27, 1860.

== Annotations ==
He was often called by the demonym Işkodralı. In modern historiography, he is known in English-language works as "Mustafa Pasha Bushatli". In Serbian, he is known as Mustafa-paša Bušatlija (Мустафа-паша Бушатлија). Robert Elsie calls him by the Albanian neologism "Mustafa Reshiti Pasha Bushatlliu".

== See also ==
- Third Scutari-Ottoman War

Preceded by Ibrahim Pasha	Pasha of Scutari; 1810––1831	Succeeded by ?
Preceded by ?	Ankara Eyalet; 1846–?	Succeeded by ?
Preceded by ?	Herzegovina Eyalet; 1853	Succeeded by ?
Preceded by ?	Medina ?–1860	Succeeded by ?
