= Sanjak of Dibra =

Region in the Ottoman Empire

Sanjak of Dibra Debre Sancağı Sanxhaku i Dibrës Дебарски санџак
- Sanjak of the Ottoman Empire
- 1395–1913
- Coat of arms

- Sanjak of Dibra in c. 1900
- Capital: Debar
- History
  - Established: 1395
  - Treaty of London (1913): 30 May 1913
Succeeded by
Principality of Albania; Kingdom of Serbia
- Today part of: Albania; North Macedonia

The Sanjak of Dibra, Debar, or Dibër (Turkish: Debre Sancağı, Albanian: Sanxhaku i Dibrës, Macedonian: Дебарски санџак, romanized: Debarski sandžak) was one of the sanjaks of the Ottoman Empire. Its capital was Debar, Macedonia (modern-day North Macedonia). Today, the western part of its territory belongs to Albania (Lower Dibra and Mat) and the eastern part to North Macedonia (Reka and Debar).

== Extent and subdivisions ==
Besides Debar, the territory of the Sanjak of Dibra included part of northern Albania, namely Krujë and areas between the Mat and Black Drin rivers. In 1440, Skanderbeg was appointed as sanjakbey of the Sanjak of Dibra.

Since the mid-19th century, the Sanjak of Dibra had consisted of two kazas: Debar and Reka. By the time of its dissolution in 1912, it had four kazas: Debar, Reka, Mat and Lower Dibra.

== Culture and demographics ==
In the late Ottoman period, the Sanjak of Dibra had a population of 200,000. Debar, the main town and capital, had 20,000 inhabitants, 420 shops, 9 mosques, 10 madrasas, 5 tekkes, 11 government-run primary schools, 3 Christian primary schools, 1 secondary school, and 1 church. Due to its strategic position as the seat of a sanjak, an Ottoman army division was stationed within the town.

Albanian tribes known as the "Tigers of Dibra" held power in the mountainous areas of the sanjak, along with much of the valley. These tribes, known as malësorët (highlanders), were mostly Muslim, and governed themselves according to the Kanun, a set of traditional Albanian laws codified by Skanderbeg. The customs of these malësorët were deeply steeped in a sense of personal honor, and they were known to place great value in the concept of besa (a pledge of honor), and were also known to blood feud (See: gjakmarrja).

One of the largest tribes of the malësorët was the Mati tribe, numbering 1,200 households. One of the most prominent of the Mati families were the Zogolli, who are most notable for being the clan from which Ahmed Zogu, future king of Albania, was descended. Many pasha (senior Ottoman officials) were also from the Zogolli family.

By the 1880s, the Sanjak of Dibra was classified linguistically and culturally as part of Gegënia

== Administrative mergers (Vilayets) ==
In 1867, the Sanjak of Dibra merged with the Sanjak of Prizren and Sanjak of Scutari to become the Scutari Vilayet. In 1871, it was joined with the Sanjak of Prizren, Sanjak of Skopje and Sanjak of Niš into one vilayet, the Prizren Vilayet, which later became part of the Kosovo Vilayet in 1877.

The Sanjak of Dibra was separated from the Kosovo Vilayet and joined to the Monastir Vilayet after the Congress of Berlin in 1878. The sanjak became well-connected with the rest of the Monastir Vilayet, and in period before its dissolution, more than half of its imports came from Skopje and a quarter from Bitola.

== Dissolution ==
On 4 September 1912, the successful Albanian Revolt of 1912 led to part of the Sanjak of Dibra being permitted to move to the newly proposed Albanian Vilayet, as a result of the Revolt's demand for greater autonomy. However, the Albanian Vilayet would not be realized, due to the outbreak of the First Balkan War (1912-1913), one month later.

During the First Balkan War, the Sanjak of Dibra was occupied by the Kingdom of Serbia, along with the rest of the sanjaks set to become the proposed Albanian Vilayet. Due to the occupation, Albanian leaders petitioned Emperor Franz Joseph I of Austria-Hungary for support for Albania's independence, but all he conceded was support for Albanian autonomy within the Ottoman Empire.

Despite this, in 1912 Independent Albania was declared at the All-Albanian Congress, and it petitioned the London Conference of 1913 for recognition on the basis of the ethnic rights of Albanians, but its claims of wider sovereignty were ignored.

In the Treaty of London (1913), many of the Albanian sanjaks were partitioned between the Kingdom of Greece, the Kingdom of Montenegro, and the Kingdom of Serbia. Consequently, the Sanjak of Dibra was dissolved, and its territory was divided between Serbia and the newly established Principality of Albania.

== Governors ==
- Skanderbeg (1440–November 1443)
- Moisi Golemi (1455–?)
- Abdullah Pasha (fl. 1897)
