= Sanjak of Prizren =

Sanjak of the Ottoman Empire from 1455 to 1913

Sanjak of Prizren Prizren Sancağı Sanxhaku i Prizrenit Призренски санџак
- Sanjak of the Ottoman Empire
- 1455–1913
- Coat of arms

- Capital: Prizren
- History
  - Established: 1455
  - Treaty of London (1913): 30 May 1913
Preceded by	Succeeded by
Serbian Despotate; Principality of Dukagjini	Kingdom of Serbia
- Today part of: Kosovo, North Macedonia

The Sanjak of Prizren (Serbian: Призренски санџак / Prizrenski sandžak, Turkish: Prizren Sancağı, Albanian: Sanxhaku i Prizrenit) was one of the sanjaks in the Ottoman Empire with Prizren as its administrative centre. It was founded immediately after the Ottoman Empire captured Prizren from the Serbian Despotate in 1455. The rest of Serbian Despotate territory was conquered after the fall of Smederevo in 1459, and divided into the following sanjaks: Sanjak of Viçitrina, Sanjak of Kruševac and Sanjak of Smederevo. At the beginning of the First Balkan War in 1912, the territory of the Sanjak of Prizren was occupied by the army of the Kingdom of Serbia. Based on the Treaty of London signed on 30 May 1913, the territory of the Sanjak of Prizren became part of Serbia.

== Administrative divisions ==
According to the 1571 Ottoman register, the Sanjak of Prizren consisted of five nahiyahs: Prizren, Hoča, Žur, Trgovište and Bihor.

In its final borders (between 1889 and 1913), the Sanjak of Prizren consisted of the kaza (districts) of Prizren, Tetovo and Gostivar.

The territory that once belonged to the Sanjak of Prizren now belongs to Kosovo (Prizren region) and North Macedonia (Tetovo and Gostivar regions).

== History ==
=== Skopje, Prizren and Kosovo vilayets ===
In 1867, the Sanjak of Prizren merged with the Sanjak of Dibra and Sanjak of Skopje and became the Prizren Vilayet. In 1871 the Sanjak of Prizren became part of the newly established Prizren Vilayet. The Prizren Vilayet and its sanjaks, together with the Sanjak of Prizren, became part of the Kosovo Vilayet, which was established in 1877. Prizren was decided to be the seat of Kosovo vilayet.

The Sanjak of Niš and Sanjak of Pirot together with Vranje (which was kaza of the Sanjak of Prishtina were separated from Kosovo vilayet and joined to the Principality of Serbia after Berlin Congress in 1878. The Sanjak of Dibra was attached to the Monastir Vilayet. After those changes Kosovo Vilayet consisted of three sanjaks: the Sanjak of Prizren, Sanjak of Skopje and Sanjak of Novi Pazar. Despite the decisions of Berlin Congress to award control over the Sanjak of Novi Pazar to Austria-Hungary, it remained under de facto administration of the Ottoman Empire.

=== Young Turk Revolution ===
After the Young Turk Revolution, occurred in 1908, the Ottoman Empire organized the first parliamentary elections in the Sanjak of Prizren.

=== Disestablishment ===
Until the end of October 1912, during the First Balkan War, the Sanjak of Prizren was occupied by the Kingdom of Serbia. On the basis of the Treaty of London signed during the London Conference in 1913, its territory became part of Serbia.

== Demographics ==
The Ottoman population records for 1895 indicate 73,708 Muslims and 24,101 Christians in the Sanjak of Prizren.

== Literature ==
- Ağanoğlu, Yıldırım (2000). Salnâme-i Vilâyet-i Kosova: Yedinci defa olarak vilâyet matbaasında tab olunmuştur: 1896 (hicri 1314) Kosova vilâyet-i salnâmesi (Üsküp, Priştine, Prizren, İpek, Yenipazar, Taşlıca). İstanbul: Rumeli Türkleri Kültür ve Dayanışma Derneği.
- Katić, Tatjana (2010), Tibor Živković (ed.), Опширни попис призренског санџака из 1571. године (Detailed register of the prizren sancak from 1571.) (in Serbian), Belgrade: Istorijski Institut, ISBN 978-86-7743-081-8, OCLC 712374230
- Yücel Yigit (2010), "Prizren Sancağı'nın Idarî Yapısı (1864–1912)", History Studies (in Turkish), vol. 2/1
