= Manastir vilayet =

Ottoman province

ولايت مناستر Vilâyet-i Manastır
- Vilayet of the Ottoman Empire
- 1874–1877; 1879–1912
- Flag

- The Manastir Vilayet in 1867–1912
- Capital: Manastir
- Population
  - 1911: 1,069,789
- History
  - Established: 1874
  - Disestablished: 1912
Preceded by
Rumelia Eyalet
Succeeded by
Independent Albania
Kingdom of Greece
Kingdom of Serbia
- Today part of: Albania; North Macedonia; Greece

The Vilayet of Manastir (Ottoman Turkish: ولايت مناستر, romanized: Vilâyet-i Manastır) was a first-level administrative division (vilayet) of the Ottoman Empire, created in 1874, dissolved in 1877 and re-established in 1879. The vilayet was occupied during the First Balkan War in 1912 and divided between the Kingdom of Greece and the Kingdom of Serbia, with some parts later becoming part of the newly established Principality of Albania.

== Administrative divisions ==
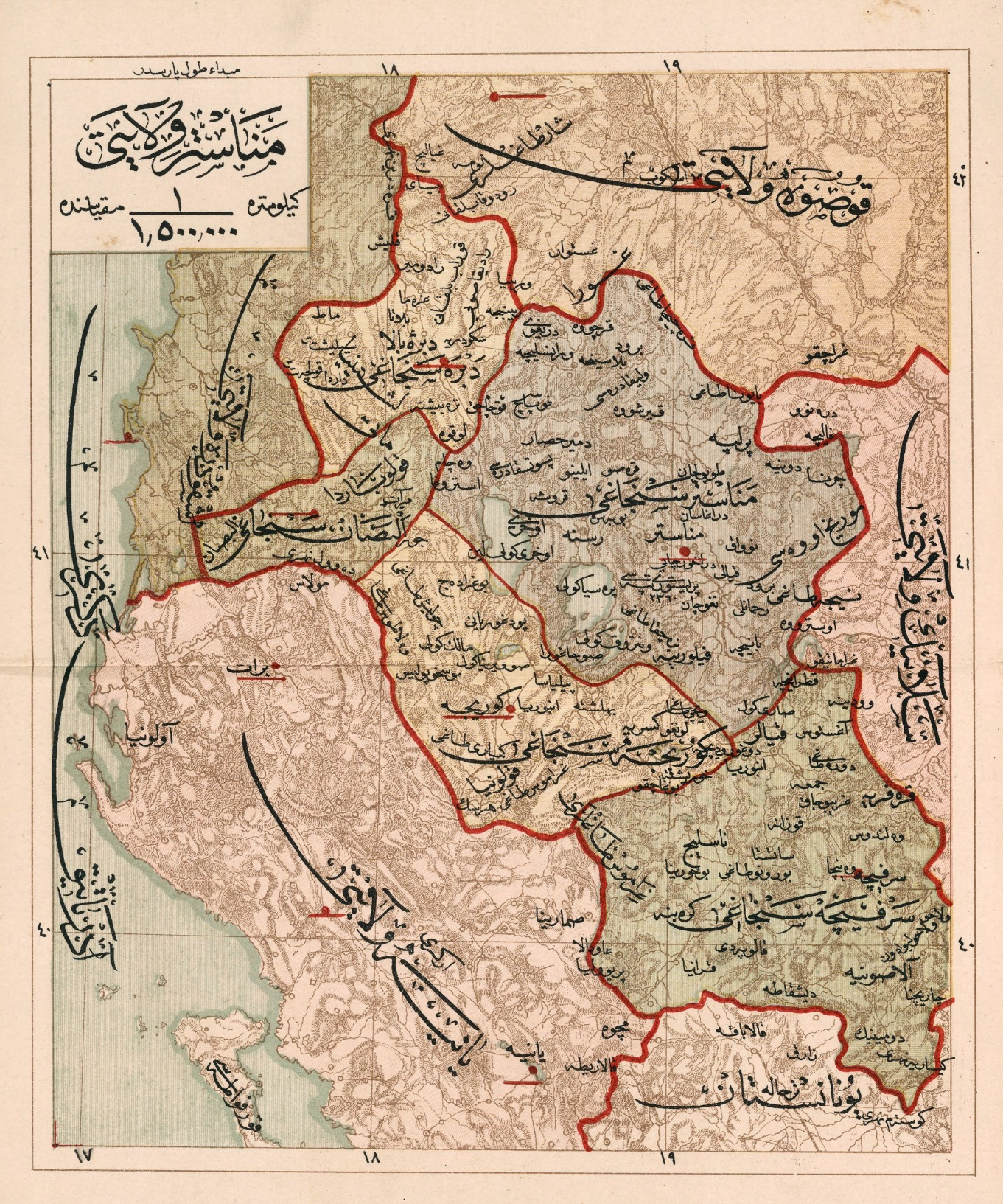
Ottoman map from 1907, showing the vilayet's five sanjaks

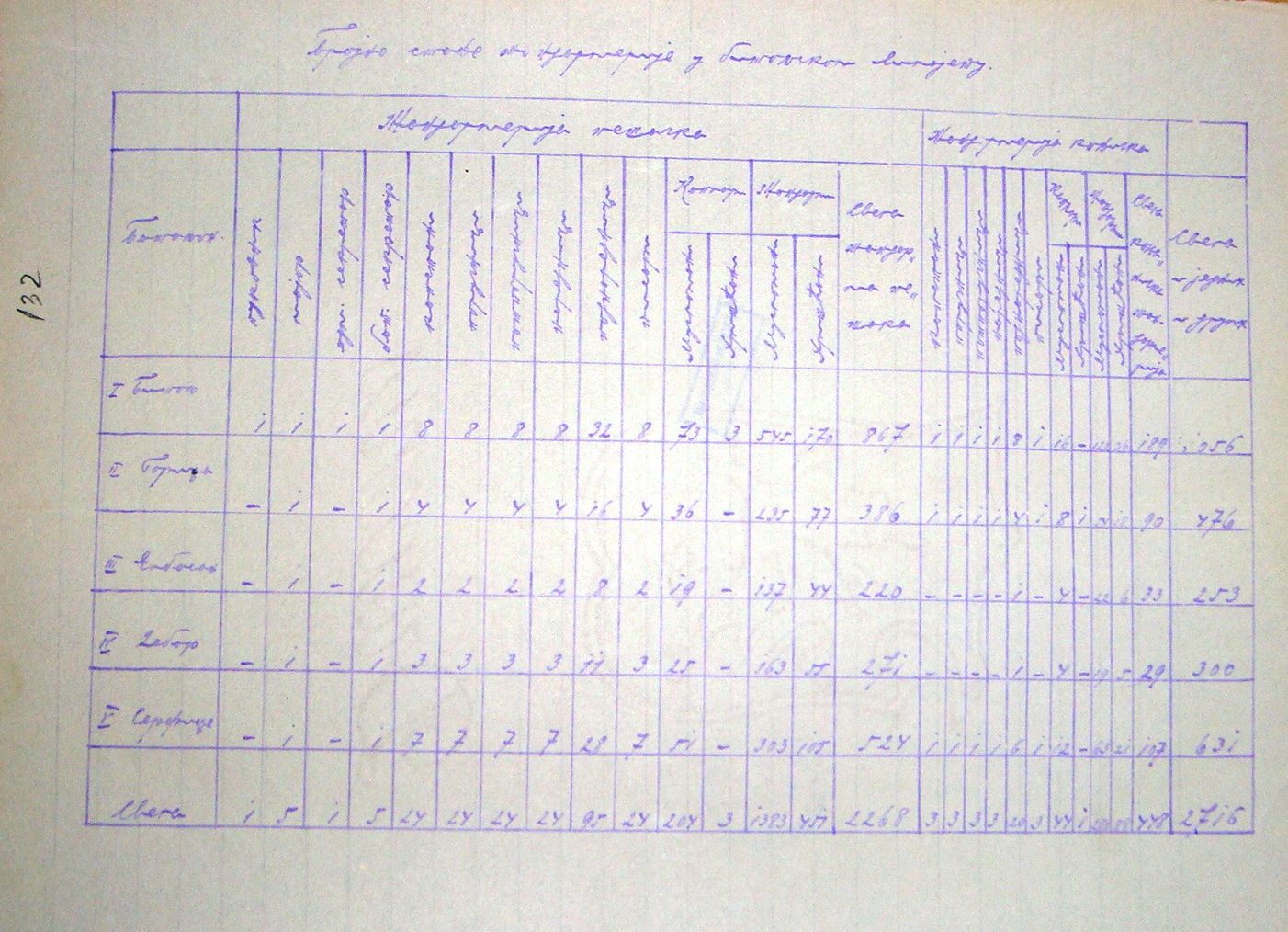
Table of the quantity and composition of the gendarmerie in the Bitola Vilayet (Bitola, July 22, 1904)

Initially the Manastir Vilayet had the following sanjaks:

- Sanjak of Manastir
- Sanjak of Prizren
- Sanjak of Dibra
- Sanjak of Scutari

After some administrative reforms accomplished in 1867 and 1877 parts of the Manastir Vilayet were ceded to newly established Scutari Vilayet (1867) and Kosovo Vilayet (1877).

The administrative divisions of the Manastir Vilayet until 1912 were:

- Sanjak of Monastir: Kazas of Manastir (Bitola), Pirlepe (Prilep), Florina, Kıraçova (Kičevo) and Ohrid.
- Sanjak of Serfiğe (Between 1864–1867 and 1873–1892): Kazas of Serfiçe (modern Servia), Kozana (modern Kozani), Alasonya (modern Elasson), Kayalar (Ptolemaida), Nasliç (modern Neapolis, Kozani) and Grebne (modern Grevena).
- Sanjak of Dibra: Kazas of Debre-i Bala (Debar), Mat, Debre-i Zir (Its center was Piskopoya), Rakalar (region around river Radika, its local name is River region (Macedonian: Река)).
- Sanjak of Elbasan (İlbasan): Kazas of İlbasan, Grameç and Peklin.
- Sanjak of Görice: Kazas of Görice (Korçë), İstarova (Pogradec), Kolonya (Erseke) (Its center was Ersek) and Kesriye (Kastoria).

== Demographics ==
=== 1897 ===
According to Russian consul in the Manastir Vilayet, A. Rostkovski, finishing the statistical article in 1897, the total population was 803,340, with Rostkovski grouping the population into the following groups:

- Turks, Ottomans: 78,867
- Albanians, Ghegs: 144,918
- Albanians, Tosks: 81,518
- Albanians, Christians: 35,525
- Slavs, Exarchists: 186,656
- Slavs, Patriarchists: 93,694
- Slavs, Muslims: 11,542
- Greeks, Christians: 97,439
- Greeks, Muslims: 10,584
- Vlachs (Aromanians): 53,227
- Jews: 5,270

=== 1906/07 ===
According to the 1906/07 Ottoman census the vilayet had a total population of 824,828 people, ethnically consisting as:

- Muslims – 328,551
- Christian Greeks – 286,001
- Christian Bulgarians – 197,088
- Wallachians – 5,556
- Jews – 5,459
- Gypsies – 2,104
- Armenians – 8
- Protestants – 5
- Latins – 3
- Foreign citizens – 53

=== 1911 ===
According to Ottoman census data, the ethnoreligious composition in 1911 was the following (Serbs and Orthodox Albanians were included as either Greeks or Bulgarians):

- Muslims – 455,720
- Greeks – 349.541
- Bulgarians – 246,344
- Jews – 10,651
- Armenians – 9
- Other – 2,614

=== 1912 ===
According to an estimation published in a Belgian magazine, the ethnic composition in 1912 when the vilayet was dissolved during the First Balkan War was:

- Orthodox Bulgarians – 331,000
- Muslim Albanians – 219,000
- Orthodox Vlachs – 65,500
- Orthodox Greeks – 62,000
- Muslim Bulgarians – 24,000
- Muslim Turks – 11,500
- mixed – 35,000
