= Selenicë =

Selenicë Selenitsã
- Municipality
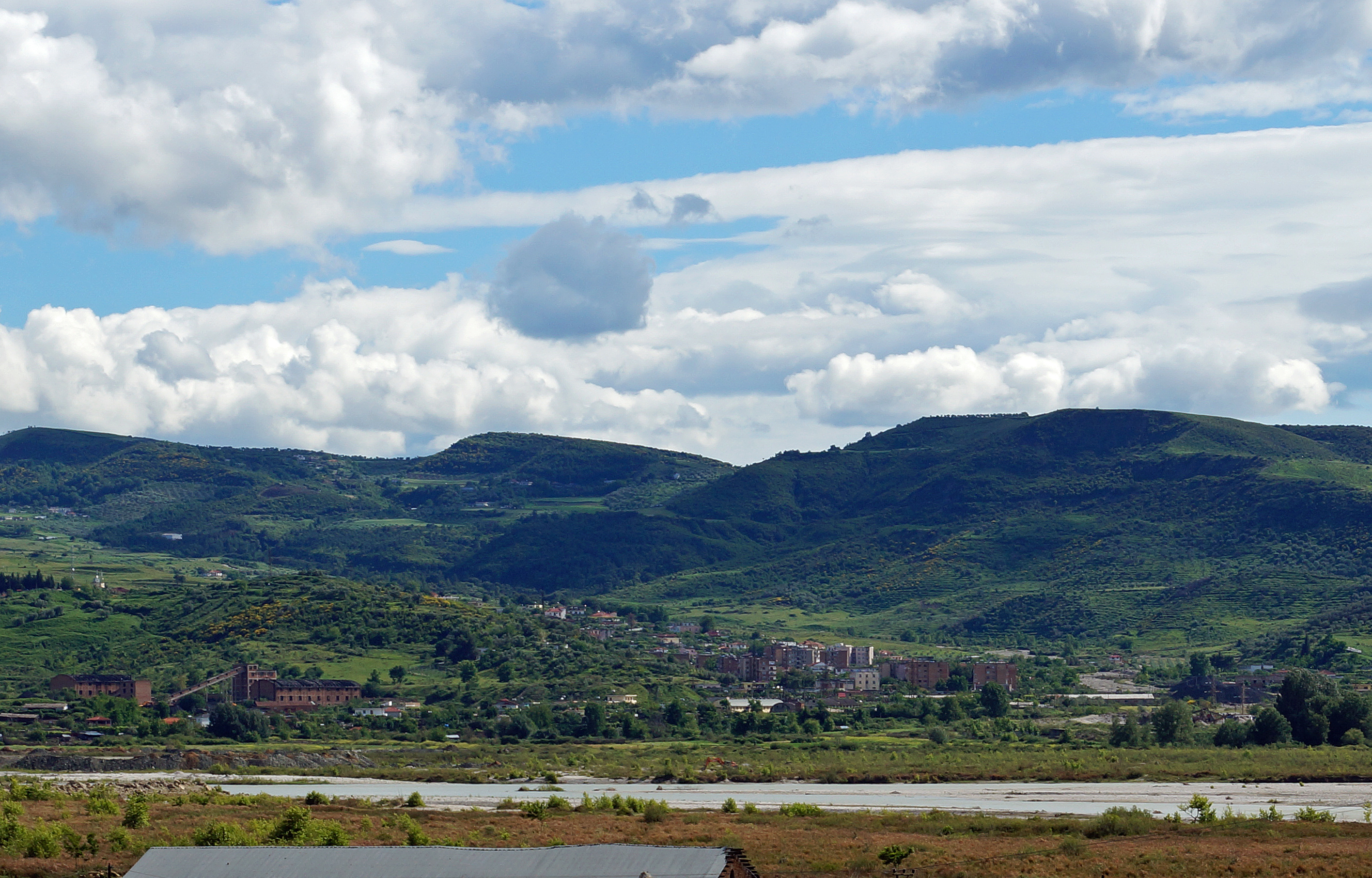
- The city and the mines from the north

- Emblem

- Location within Albania
- Coordinates: 40°32′N 19°38′E
- Country: Albania
- County: Vlorë

Government
  - Mayor: Nertil Bellaj (PS)

Area
  - Municipality: 561.52 km^{2} (216.80 sq mi)

Population (2011)
  - Municipality: 16,396
  - Municipality density: 29.199/km^{2} (75.626/sq mi)
  - Administrative unit: 2,235
- Time zone: UTC+1 (CET)
  - Summer (DST): UTC+2 (CEST)
- Postal Code: 9427
- Area Code: (0)392
- Website: www.selenica.gov.al

Selenicë (Aromanian: Selenitsã) is a municipality in Vlorë County, southwestern Albania. It was formed at the 2015 local government reform by the merger of the former municipalities Armen, Brataj, Kotë, Selenicë, Sevaster and Vllahinë, that became municipal units. The seat of the municipality is the town Selenicë.

The total population is 16,396 (2011 census), in a total area of 561.52 km^{2}. The population of the former municipality at the 2011 census was 2,235. In the 2011 Albanian census, the former municipality of Selenica was the only commune where the number of self-declared Aromanians (16.6%) outnumbered the number of declared ethnic Albanians (10%), while most inhabitants did not declare any ethnicity. According to a 2014 Albanian government report, around 100 Greeks also live in Selenicë.

The town is well known for its bitumen mines. The football (soccer) club is KS Selenicë.

On 23 September 2021, the 10 May 1905 School was founded in Selenicë. It is a school for Aromanian children, where they can study for some hours every day in Aromanian as well as in Romanian. The school has two classes, both named after prominent figures for Romanian diplomacy: Vasile Stoica and Nicuță Balamaci. The school was founded without any financial support from the Romanian state by the Nicolae Iorga Foundation of Sarandë, a cultural association of Albanian Aromanians then led by president Pano Bakali.

== Notable people ==
- Ali Asllani, was an Albanian poet, politician and activist of the Albanian National Awakening.
- Arbri Beqaj, Albanian footballer
- Kadri Hazbiu, Albanian politician of the Albanian Party of Labour
- Qazim Koculi, Albanian politician of the early 20th century and one-day acting Prime Minister of Albania
- Faruk Myrtaj, Albanian poet and novelist
- Demir Vlonjati, Albanian folk singer, composer and poet.
