= Tosks =

Albanian linguistic grouping

Tosks (Albanian: Toskët) are one of two major dialectal subgroups of Albanians (the other being the Ghegs) differentiated by their linguistic characteristics.

== Territory ==
Tosk or Toskëri may refer to the Tosk-speaking Albanian population of southern Albania and internal subgroups include the Myzeqars of Myzeqe. The Labs of Labëria (name version in Albanian: sing: Lab, pl. Lebër, also dial. sing.: Lap) and Chams of Çamëria are separate southern Albanian subgroups which at times are also included in the category of Tosks due to ethno-cultural and dialectal similarities. The Arvanites of Greece and Arbëreshë of Italy are, mainly, descendants of Tosk-speaking settlers, as are the original inhabitants of the village of Mandritsa in Bulgaria. The name Toskëria itself is often used to name all Tosk-speaking parts of Albania, in contrast to northern Gegëria.

The Tosks in Albania live indicatively south of the Shkumbin river. This region is widely referred to by Albanians as Toskëri and by foreigners as Toskeria. The Ottoman Turkish term, used during the times when Albania was included in the empire, was Toskalık meaning land of the Tosks. During the late Ottoman period apart from the term Arnavudluk (Albania) being used for Albanian regions, the designation Toskalık was also used in documents by Ottomans. In the 1880s, Albanians defined the wider region of Toskalık (Toskland) as encompassing the Ottoman administrative units of Ergiri (Gjirokastër), Preveza, Berat and Yanya (Ioannina) sanjaks part of Yanya vilayet (province) with Görice (Korçë), Monastir (Bitola) and Elbasan sanjaks of Monastir vilayet. The wider area of Toskalık was divided into three distinct regions. The first was Toskalık, the second Laplık (Labëria) being composed of the areas of Delvine (Delvinë), Avlonya (Vlorë), Tepdelen (Tepelenë), Kurules (Kurvelesh) and Ergiri (Gjirokastër). The third Camlık (Chameria) encompassed the areas of Margalic (Margariti), Aydonat (Paramithi) and Filat (Filiates).

== Language ==
A map showing Tosk speakers in crimson and orange

The Tosks speak Tosk Albanian, one of the two main Albanian dialects.

In the late Ottoman period, the upper and middle classes of Tosk society, apart from speaking Albanian, knew Greek and some Ottoman Turkish. As Albanian and Greek cultures dominated in Yanya vilayet, at home they would speak Albanian, at school in Greek and outside resort to either Albanian or Greek and much less in Ottoman Turkish due to the small number of government officials in the area. The Albanian peasantry of the countryside spoke mainly the Albanian language as a mother tongue, especially if they were Muslim. As Albanians were employed in all levels of government in Yanya vilayet, of the local population who had knowledge in the Albanian language could speak it during their interactions with the Ottoman authorities. Over time Greek words have also been incorporated into the lexicon of the Tosk dialect. Gheg and Tosk Albanians are able to understand each other.

Within an independent Albania, the Albanian communist regime based the standard Albanian language mostly on Tosk Albanian. This practice has been criticized, notably by Arshi Pipa, who claimed that this decision deprived the Albanian language of its richness at the expense of the Ghegs, and referred to the literary Albanian language as a "monstrosity" produced by the Tosk communist leadership which conquered anti-Communist north Albania militarily, and imposed their Tosk Albanian dialect on the Ghegs. Although Albanian writers in former Yugoslavia were almost all Ghegs, they chose to write in Tosk for political reasons. This change of literary language has significant political and cultural consequences because the language is the main criterion for self-identification of the Albanians. Despite all efforts to unify Albanian language in some cases Ghegs from remote northern regions can not have conversation with Tosks from the further south.

== Religion ==
Initially the population of Albania was Orthodox Christian, but in the middle of the 13th century the Ghegs converted to Catholicism. Although many Tosks remained Orthodox Christians, the sense of strong division between Catholic Albanians and Orthodox Albanians did not evolve until the middle of the 18th century. Most Tosks are either Orthodox Christians or Bektashis in background. The Orthodox are more predominant in the regions around Gjirokastër, around Leskovik, and in the Myzeqe region (which includes the areas around Fier, Kuçova and Lushnja) and in the Dangëllia region (around Përmet) while Bektashis and are more heavily concentrated around Vlora, Tepelena, Mallakastra, Pogradec and in Skrapar, Erseka and Gramsh. Other sects of Islam are present too, with Sunnis present mostly in cities and in far eastern regions (especially in Macedonia and Devoll) while there are also Halvetis in Berat. In almost all these areas, however, Christians, Bektashis and sometimes other sects of Muslims live side by side. Christians and Muslims were historically (around the time of the fall of the Ottoman Empire) almost evenly distributed in the Korça District and the area in and around the cities of Berat and Lushnja.

The Arbëreshë of Italy, who are of Tosk descent, kept their Byzantine worship but reconciled with the Catholic Church, and today have their own rite, the Italo-Albanian Catholic Church.

Many Tosks are irreligious due to communist rule and a largely irreligious and secular population remains prevalent in much of Southern Albania.

== Culture and social organization ==
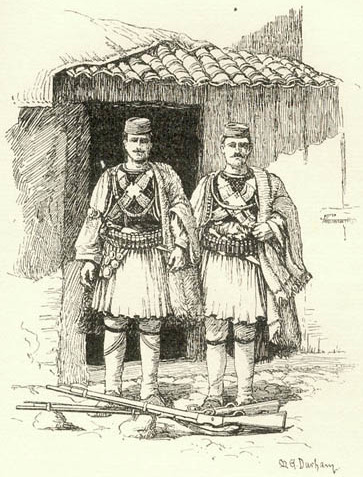
Tosks in their traditional costumes

The Tosks maintained substantial contacts with outside world and were more influenced by it. Some authors believe Tosks are more progressive and open than Ghegs. Tosks intermarried with non-Albanians more than Ghegs. Nineteenth century Albanian views of the Tosks as expressed by Sami Frashëri was that unity existed with the Ghegs along with few differences of dialect and pronunciation, while in warfare Tosks were better at perseverance and resistance than Ghegs who were skilled in attack.

Tosks abandoned the tribal social organization by the end of the 14th century and the Ottoman conquest of their territory. During the Ottoman period, society in Toskëria was composed of a few rich wealthy Muslim Albanian landowning families that rose through the course of centuries within the imperial system owning large parts of the countryside and big estates. Tosk Albanians supplied the Ottoman empire with elites who served in high positions within the bureaucracy and military. The landowning notables were referred to as beys and formed the foundation of Ottoman control within southern Albania. Prominent families included the Vrioni and Vlora based in the fertile Myzeqe plain within the Sanjak of Berat who sold their agricultural produce to Italy and apart from their economic power also exercised powerful influence upon the local Ottoman administration. The wealthy landowning class derived their income from lumbering, mining, farming and other smaller industries and were similar to the nobility of Europe, though on a smaller scale.

Ruling as feudal lords over the peasantry, the landowning class would at times settle legal issues without resorting to usual government channels and the beys viewed themselves as patriarchs that defended and counseled their peasants. Members from the landowning class would represent a peasant to Ottoman authorities while settling small disputes among the peasants in their own way. In some statistics the landowner received 50-60 percent of earnings by the peasantry of whom also had to pay tax to Ottoman authorities. Peasants often had little to live on and households were poor, with up to seven families at a time residing in a two or three room dwelling. Ottomans outside the area viewed Tosk society as split between the classes of zalim (oppressor) and mazlum (oppressed). During the Hamidian period, Tosk towns underwent slow growth of the Albanian middle class that was composed of government officials, lawyers, physicians, teachers, merchants and artisans. Some middle class Albanians over time joined the beys to generate an intellectual class that worked toward a cultural and linguistic Albanian awakening. At the end of 19th and beginning of 20th century many Albanians migrated to United States and almost all of them were Tosks. There was also substantial migration of Tosks to Greece, particularly its northern part.

== Physical anthropology ==
The Tosks have often been described as shorter, less slender and described as being of a darker Mediterranean type to the Ghegs. The Tosks have smaller noses and rounder faces than Ghegs. Some claim that this difference has been reduced due to population movement in post-Communist period.

== History ==
=== Pre-Ottoman and Ottoman period ===
There was a distinction between Ghegs and Tosks before the Ottomans appeared in Albania at the end of the 14th century. In the Ottoman Empire this division was additionally solidified because Tosks established strong cultural and intellectual connection with Istanbul and generally, the rest of the world. During the Ottoman period, of the thirty Grand Viziers of Albanian ethnicity to serve the empire, most of them were Tosks such as Mehmed Ferid Pasha (1851-1914) of the Vlora family.

By the middle of the nineteenth century Toskëria was considerably better integrated within the Ottoman system and had better connections with the wider world than its northern regional counterpart of Gegënia. Despite Toskëria being integrated within the Ottoman system, the area still showed levels of regionalism.

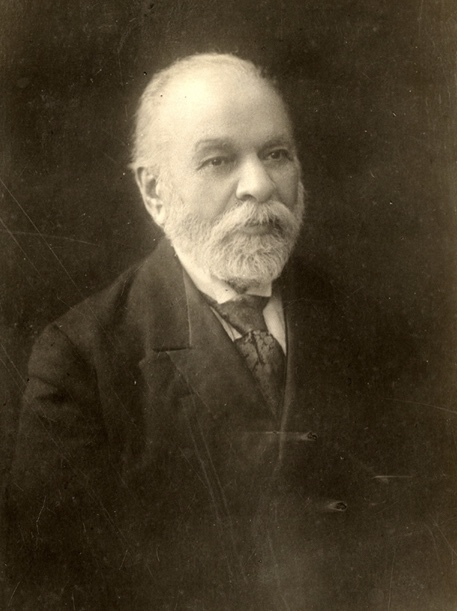
Ismail Qemali, first president and prime minister of an independent Albania

The Great Eastern Crisis resulted in Albanian resistance to partition by neighbouring powers with the formation of the Prizren League which issued a Kararname (memorandum) that declared both Tosks and Ghegs had made an oath to defend the state and homeland in the name of Islam. Tosk Albanians living in Yanya vilayet had to deal with land claims by Greece based on the Megali Idea to areas of Toskëria that they lived in. During the crisis Tosks and Ghegs made besas (pledges of honor) to arm themselves and shed blood to defend their rights. Other Albanians, mostly Tosks developed ideological arguments and led the information campaign for autonomy by sending petitions in 1878 to the Berlin Congress that were against the territorial ambitions of its neighbors and for the creation of a unitary Albanian province. Lacking a tribal network of the Ghegs, Tosk society instead relied on the Bektashi network to spread information and mobilise Albanians to resist any annexation by Greece of the Yanya vilayet in 1880. During this time Tosks led the way in articulating Albanianism based on a national program demanding Albanian sociopolitical rights.

Tosk Albanians in July 1906 were unable to have their request to sultan Abdul Hamid II granted for permission to establish schools in Shkodër, Monastir and Yanya to teach the Albanian language. During the Young Turk Revolution (1908) Tosks, with some being Committee of Union and Progress (CUP) members were one group in Albanian society that gave its support for the restoration of the Ottoman constitution of 1876 with some fighting in guerilla bands to end the Hamidian regime. The revolution had raised hopes among Albanians and the new Young Turk (CUP) government which had relied on Tosk and Gheg support promised them to better governance.

The Albanian revolt of 1911 and the subsequent Greçë Memorandum calling for sociopolitical rights received support from Tosk leaders who sent telegrams to Istanbul demanding autonomy and unification of four provinces: Shkodër, Kosovo, Monastir and Yanya into one province of Albania. The Ottoman government seeking to quell unrest decided to negotiate with Tosk Albanians at Tepelenë on 18 August 1911 for a solution and a deal was struck promising Albanian education, linguistic and a few sociopolitical rights.

=== Albania ===
In the 1920s many Tosks were poverty-stricken serfs. As a result, Tosk Albanians made up around three quarters of the membership of the Albanian Communist Party.

== Notable Tosks ==
- Ahmed Niyazi Bey
- Ali Demi
- Ali Pasha Tepelena
- Dhimitër Beratti
- Mehdi Frashëri
- Midhat Frashëri
- Enver Hoxha
- Ismail Qemali
- Kostandin Kristoforidhi
- Lütfi Pasha
- Mehmet Shehu
- Muhammad Ali of Egypt
- Naum Veqilharxhi
- Spiridon Ilo
- Çerçiz Topulli
- Foto Strakosha, Former Albanian national team goalkeeper.
- Thomas Strakosha, Albanian national team goalkeeper who currently plays for Brentford F.C.
- Amanda Koçi, singer and songwriter
- Giovanni Paramithiotti, Founder of Inter Milan football club. His family is from Çamëria Paramythia.
- Donika Kastrioti, The wife of Skanderbeg and mother of their child Gjon Kastrioti II, born into the Arianiti family of nobles. Born in Kaninë a village in Vlore.
- Grigor Gjirokastriti, (died 1828) was an Albanian scholar and cleric who became Metropolitan of Athens in 1827–1828 and translated the New Testament into Albanian using the Greek alphabet.
- Kolë Idromeno, (15 August 1860 – 12 December 1939), was an Albanian painter, sculptor, architect, photographer, cinematographer, composer and engineer during the Albanian Renaissance in the nineteenth century. He is widely regarded as a precursor of both realism and landscape art in Albania.

== See also ==
- Tosk Albanian
- Albanians
- Arbëreshë people
- Albanians in Greece
- Arvanites
