= Ali Pasha's Invasion of the Pashalik of Berat =

Ali Pasha's Invasion of Pashalik of Berat Pushtimi i Ali Pashës në Pashalikun e Beratit
- Part of Ali Pasha's Expansionist Campaigns
Date	1808–1809
Location	Pashalik of Berat (modern-day Albania)
Result	Victory for Ali Pasha: Pashalik of Berat is occupied by Ali Pasha's forces
Territorial changes	Ali Pasha extends control over Berat

Belligerents
Pashalik of Ioannina	Pashalik of Berat

Commanders and leaders
Ali Pasha of Tepelena	Ibrahim Pasha of Berat

Strength
Unknown	Unknown

Casualties and losses
Unknown	Unknown

In 1808, Ali Pasha of Tepelena, the ruler of the Pashalik of Ioannina, led a pivotal military campaign against Ibrahim Pasha, who governed the Pashalik of Berat. Ali Pasha's aim was to consolidate his power in Epirus and expand his influence throughout the western Balkans. The campaign resulted in Ali Pasha's successful annexation of Berat, further strengthening his authority within the Ottoman Empire.

Ali Pasha’s rise to power was emblematic of late 18th-century Ottoman political dynamics. From a provincial ruler, he eventually controlled a large portion of modern Albania and Greece. The conquest of Berat marked a key moment in Ali Pasha’s expansionist policies and laid the foundation for the establishment of a quasi-independent state based in Ioannina

== Background ==
By the 1780s Ali Pasha had already solidified his control over Ioannina and the surrounding region. However, his ambition extended far beyond Ioannina, as he sought to increase his territory through conquest. The Pashalik of Berat, under Ibrahim Pasha, became a key target for Ali Pasha’s expansion due to its strategic location and wealth.

Ibrahim Pasha governed a region that was both prosperous and politically significant. In 1808, Ali Pasha of Tepelena embarked on a campaign to isolate Ibrahim Pasha of Berat diplomatically and militarily. Using a combination of force and political maneuvering, Ali Pasha began his campaign to subjugate the Pashalik of Berat

== Invasion and conflict ==
Ali Pasha launched his invasion of the Pashalik of Berat in 1808, leading his forces personally. Ali besieged Ibrahim Pasha in Berat with an 8,000-man army commanded by the Albanian captain Omer Bey Vrioni, and with the aid of British Congreve rockets, Berat finally fell after a year of skirmishing. Ibrahim retired to Vlorë, and Ali told the Porte that he had taken Berat in response to the revolts in upper Albania that were the result of Ibrahim's inability to rule.

Aware that the sultan was not pleased with his actions, Ali did not press on with his offensive and target Vlorë. Eventually, Sultan Mahmud II was forced to acknowledge Ali's actions as the most suitable way to maintain order, and Ali quickly conquered Vlorë, stretching his dominion from Durrës in the north to Arta in the south. Ali also purchased the pitch mines between Berat and Vlorë from the Porte, which allowed him to begin exporting goods throughout the Mediterranean from Vlorë. Ali named his son Mukhtar as the new pasha of Berat, while the former pasha Ibrahim was imprisoned and eventually poisoned.

== Aftermath ==
Successful annexation of Berat significantly expanded Ali Pasha’s power and influence. Control over Berat allowed Ali Pasha to dominate a larger portion of southern Albania and parts of northern Greece, consolidating Ioannina as the center of his power. This victory was crucial in Ali Pasha’s rise, as it not only expanded his territory but also bolstered his reputation as a formidable military and political leader.

Ali Pasha’s success at Berat paved the way for further territorial expansions and conflicts with both neighboring regions and the central Ottoman authorities. His increased power eventually led to his rebellion against the Ottoman Sultan in the early 19th century, which culminated in his death in 1822.

== Legacy ==
Ali Pasha's conquest of the Pashalik of Berat is remembered as a critical moment in his quest for dominance in the western Balkans. Known for his authoritarian rule, Ali Pasha also initiated significant infrastructure projects to modernize his territories. His control over Berat and subsequent expansions transformed him into one of the most powerful provincial rulers within the Ottoman Empire, leaving a lasting impact on the history and politics of the Balkans.

== Sources ==
- Russell, Quentin; Russell, Eugenia (September 30, 2017). Ali Pasha, Lion of Ioannina: The Remarkable Life of the Balkan Napoleon. Pen and Sword. ISBN 978-1-4738-7722-1.
