= Albanian Pashaliks =

Three semi-independent pashaliks ruled by Albanian pashas from 1756 to 1831

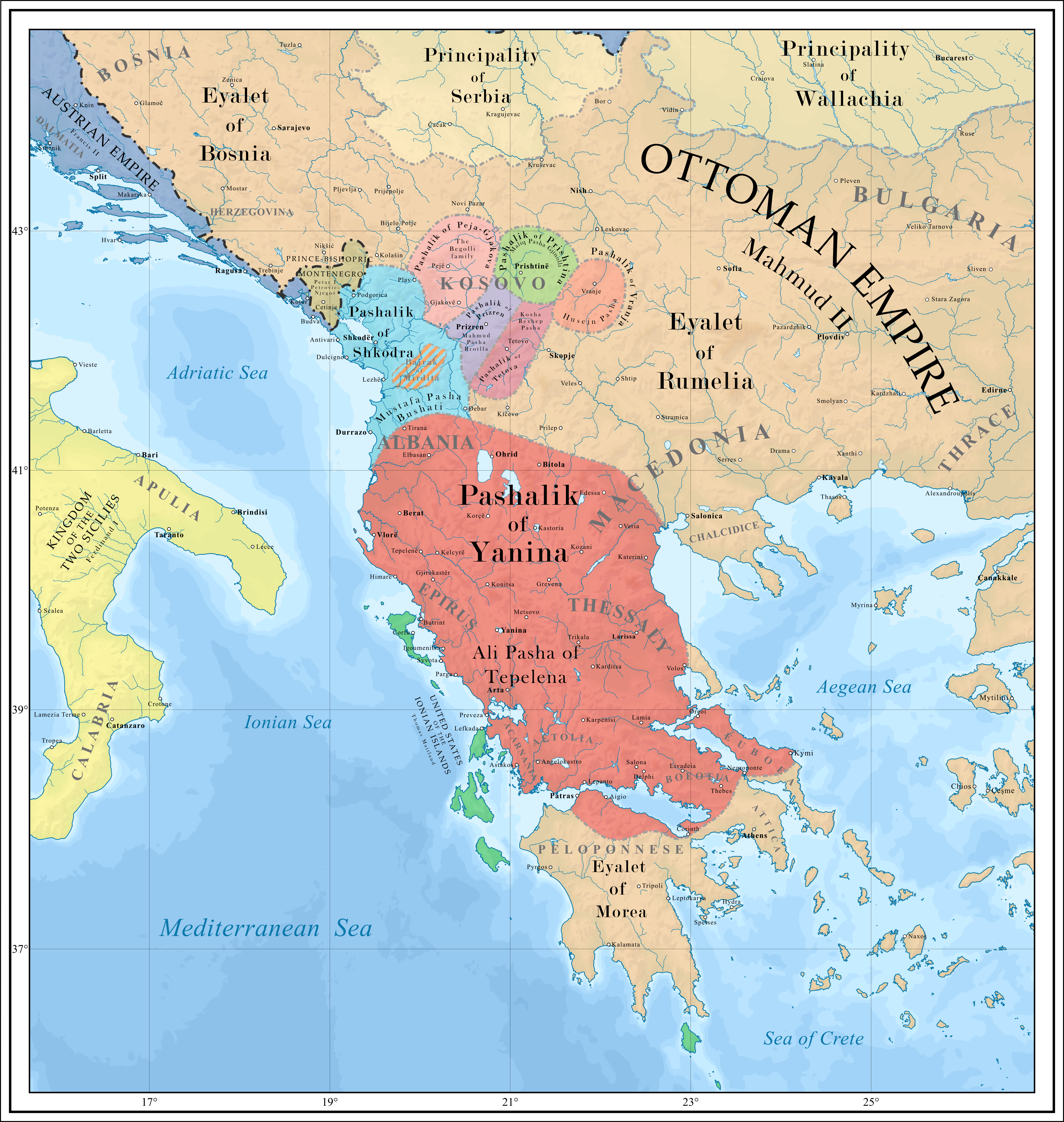
The Albanian Pashaliks in 1815–1821.

The Albanian Pashaliks (Albanian: Pashallëqet shqiptare) were three semi-independent pashaliks under Ottoman suzerainty that were ruled by Albanian pashas from 1757 to 1831. It covered the territories of modern Albania, Kosovo, most of Montenegro, southern Serbia, western North Macedonia and most of mainland Greece. The degree of independence of these pashaliks varied over time, from semi-autonomous to de facto independent.

== List of Albanian Pashaliks ==
Nr	Pashalik	Main ruler	Years
1	Pashalik of Scutari	Kara Mahmud Bushati	1757–1831
2	Pashalik of Janina	Ali Pasha	1787–1822
3	Pashalik of Berat	Ahmet Kurt Pasha	1774–1809

== Pashalik of Scutari ==
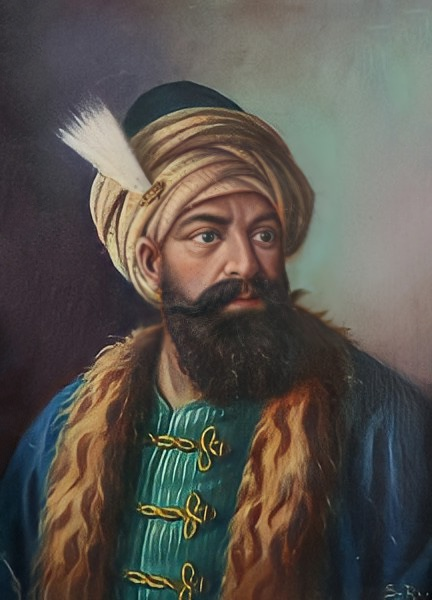
Kara Mahmud Pasha

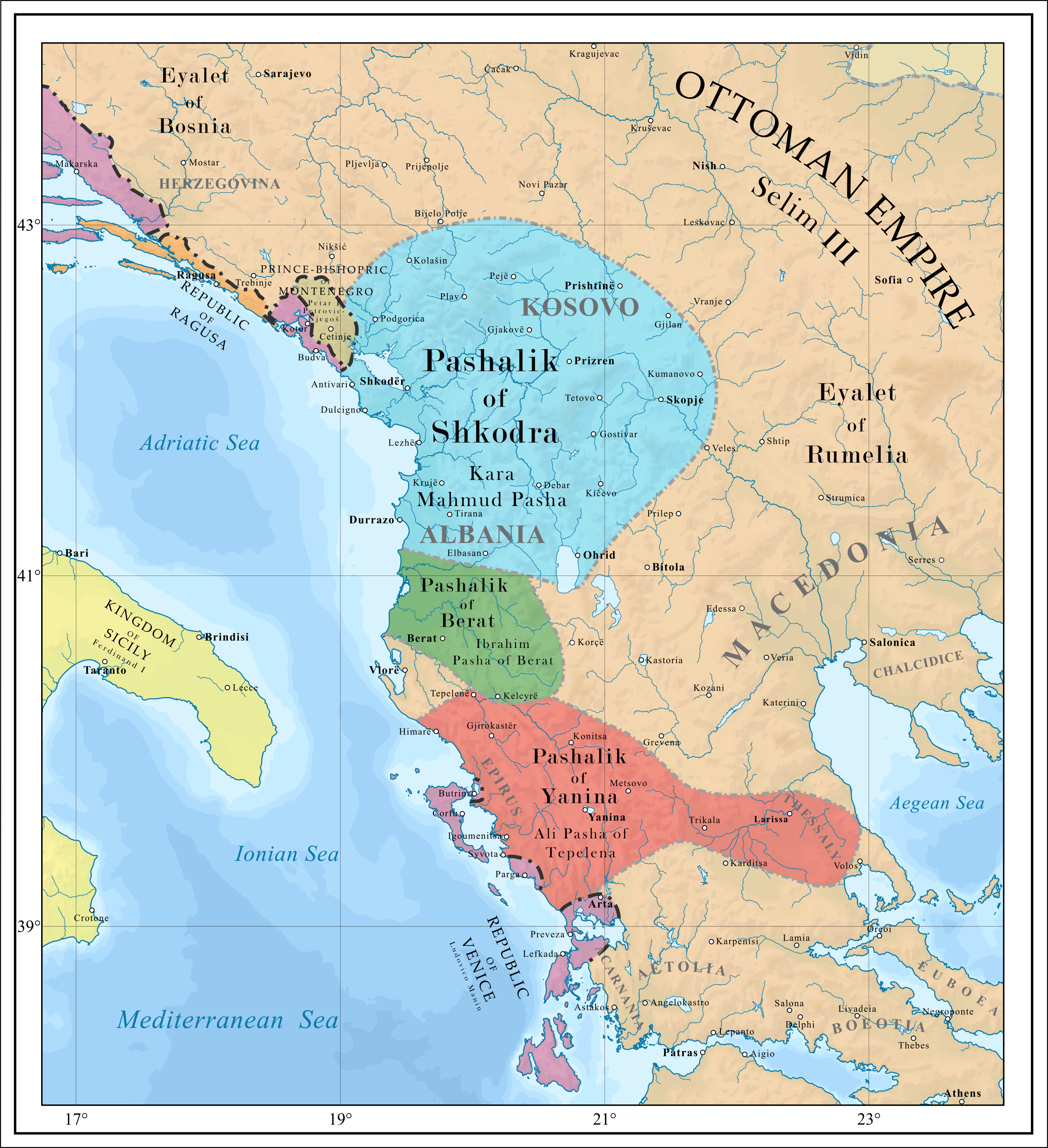
The Albanian pashaliks in 1790–1795.

The Pashalik of Scutari or Pashalik of Shkodra (1757–1831) was a semi-autonomous and at times de facto independent entity within the Ottoman Empire, created by Albanian leaders of Northern Ottoman Albania, covering today's Northern Albania, most of Montenegro, southern Serbia, most of Kosovo, and northwestern North Macedonia. The Pashalik also expanded into Central Albania, southwestern North Macedonia, and northern West Macedonia. The weakening of Ottoman central authority and the timar system brought anarchy to the Albanian-populated lands. In the late 18th century, two Albanian centers of power emerged: Shkodër, under the Bushati family; and Janina, under Ali Pasha of Tepelenë. When it suited their goals, both places cooperated with the Sublime Porte, and when it was expedient to defy the central government, each acted independently. In 1757, Mehmed Bey Bushati proclaimed himself Pasha of Shkodër, eying at a degree of autonomy/independence Mehmed Ali Pasha had established for himself in Egypt. His son and successor Kara Mahmoud pursued a policy of military expansion; he established his control over northern Albania (up to the Shkumbi River) and over Kosovo. He launched two attacks on Montenegro (1785, 1796) and defeated resp. outlasted several Ottoman expeditions dispatched to subdue him. Kara Mahmoud's autonomous pashalik did receive the attention of the Austrian and Russian foreign office, both regarding him a potential ally against the Sublime Porte. In 1796, Kara Mahmoud was killed when he suffered defeat at the hands of the Montenegrins. He was succeeded by his brother Ibrahim Pasha, a less warlike personality loyal to the Ottoman Empire (-1810). The Bushati Dynasti continued to hold on to the Pashalik until an Ottoman army under Mehmet Reshid Pasha besieged Rozafat Castle at Shkodër in 1831 and forced Mustafa Bushati to surrender (1831). The pashalik was dissolved, the Vilayets of Shkodër and of Kosovo established. An uprising in Shkodër in 1833-1836 failed in reestablishing the autonomy enjoyed under the Bushati. The latter established the Bushati Library in the 1840s, which played an important role in the cultural awakening of northern Albania.

== Pashalik of Janina ==
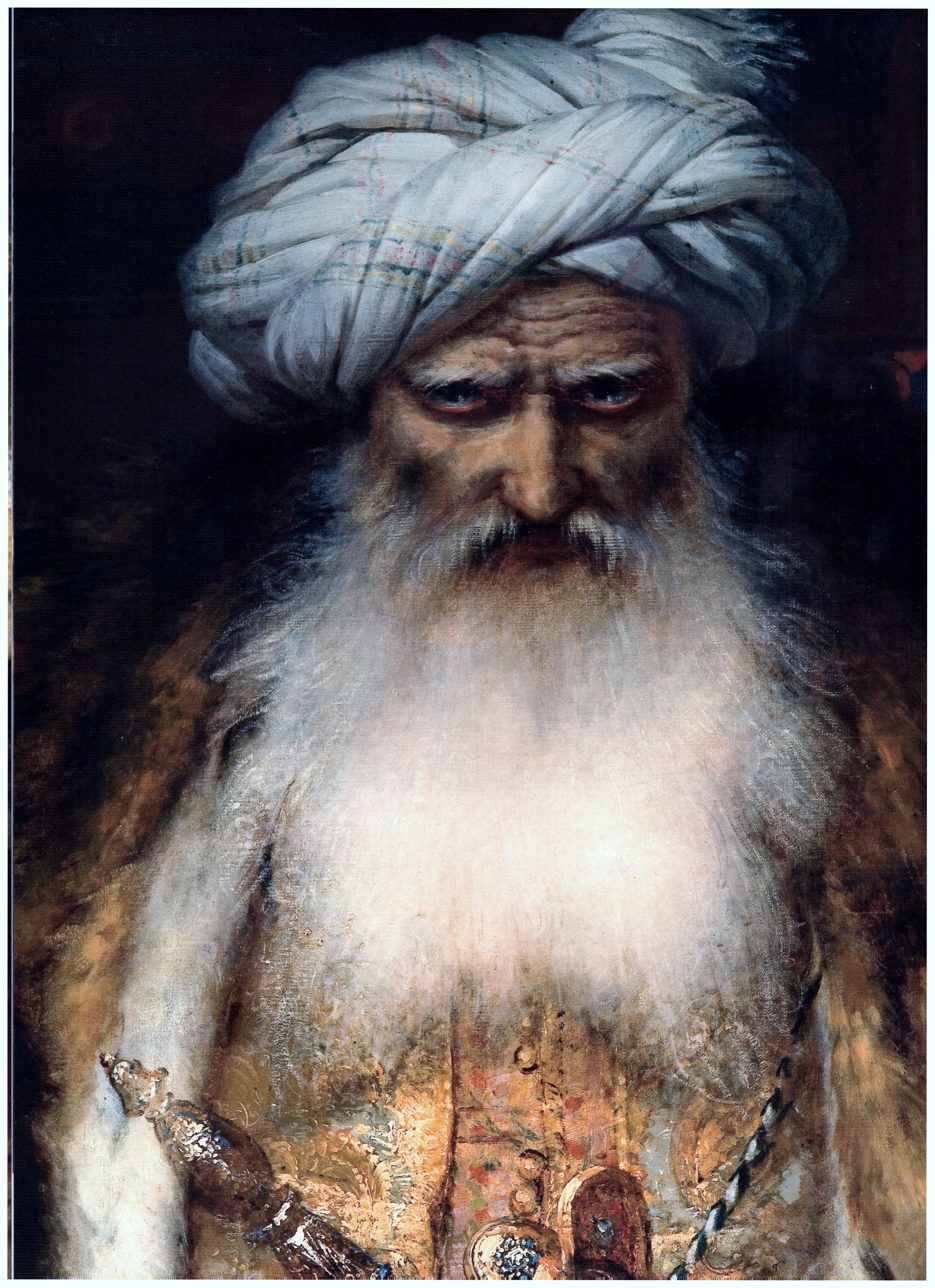
Ali Pasha of Tepelenë

The Pashalik of Yanina or Pashalik of Janina (1787–1822) was a de facto independent entity under the Ottoman Empire, created by Ali Pasha, an Albanian leader of Southern Ottoman Albania, encompassing most of mainland Greece, Southern and Central Albania, and southwest North Macedonia. In 1787 Ali Pasha was awarded the pashaluk of Trikala in reward for his support for the sultan's war against Austria. This was not enough to satisfy his ambitions; shortly afterwards, he seized control of Ioánnina, which remained his power base for the next 33 years. Like other regional leaders that emerged in that time, such as Osman Pazvantoğlu, he took advantage of a weak Ottoman government to expand his territory still further until he gained de facto control of most of Albania, western Greece and the Peloponnese, either directly or through his sons. Ali's policy as ruler of Ioánnina was governed by little more than simple expediency; he operated as an effectively independent despot and allied himself with whoever offered the most advantage at the time. In order to gain a seaport on the Albanian coast Ali formed an alliance with Napoleon I of France who had established Francois Pouqueville as his general consul in Ioánnina. After the Treaty of Tilsitt where Napoleon granted the Czar his plan to dismantle the Ottoman Empire, Ali switched sides and allied with the United Kingdom of Great Britain and Ireland in 1807. His machinations were permitted by the Ottoman government in Istanbul for a mixture of expediency - it was deemed better to have Ali as a semi-ally than as an enemy - and weakness, as the central government did not have enough strength to oust him at that time. The poet George Gordon Byron, 6th Baron Byron visited Ali's court in Ioánnina in 1809 and recorded the encounter in his work Childe Harold. He evidently had mixed feelings about the despot, noting the splendour of Ali's court and the Greek cultural revival that he had encouraged in Ioánnina, which Byron described as being "superior in wealth, refinement and learning" to any other Greek town. In a letter to his mother, however, Byron deplored Ali's cruelty: "His Highness is a remorseless tyrant, guilty of the most horrible cruelties, very brave, so good a general that they call him the Mahometan Buonaparte ... but as barbarous as he is successful, roasting rebels, etc, etc.."

In 1820, Ali ordered the assassination of a political opponent in Constantinople. The reformist Sultan Mahmud II, who sought to restore the authority of the Sublime Porte, took this opportunity to move against Ali by ordering his deposition. Ali refused to resign his official posts and put up a formidable resistance to Ottoman troop movements, indirectly helping the Greek Independence as some 20,000 Turkish troops were fighting Ali's formidable army. In January 1822, however, Ottoman agents assassinated Ali Pasha and sent his head to the Sultan. After his death the pashalik ceased to exist.

== Pashalik of Berat ==
The Pashalik of Berat was a pashalik created in modern-day central Albania by Ahmet Kurt Pasha in 1774 and dissolved after Ahmet's ally, Ibrahim Pasha of Berat was defeated by Ali Pasha in 1809, thus incorporating the pashalik, with the Pashalik of Janina. This pashalik was one of the three pashaliks created by Albanians in the period of Albanian Pashaliks. The Pashalik of Berat was created after Ahmet Kurt Pasha managed to complot with the Sublime Porte against Mehmed Pasha Bushati in 1774. For his service, the sultan gave him territories in central Albania. He managed to grow his pashalik until his death in 1787, incorporating territories of all central Albania, bordering to the north with the Pashalik of Scutari and to the south with the Pashalik of Janina. Ahmet Kurt Pasha was the grandfather of Ali Pasha, and father of Ali's mother, Hanka. After the death of Ahmet Kurt Pasha, the territory of the pashalik was ruled by a close ally of him, Ibrahim Pasha of Berat. As this territory belonged to the Middle Albania, Ibrahim Pasha was roused at this encroachment. This made Ali Pasha start a war with the Pashalik of Berat. After some fruitless negotiation, Ibrahim Pasha sent a body of troops under the command of his brother Sephir, bey of Avlona. Against these, Ali summoned the armatoles of Thessaly; and after villages had been burnt, peasants robbed and hanged, and flocks carried off on both sides, peace was made. Ibrahim gave his daughter in marriage to Mookhtar, the eldest son of Ali, and the disputed territory as her dower. As Sephir bey had displayed qualities which might prove formidable hereafter, Ali contrived to have him poisoned by a physician; and, after his usual fashion, he hanged the agent of the crime, that no witness might remain of it. Ali Pasha has said that he should prevail over the pasha of Berat, become vizir of Epirus, fight with the Sultan, and go to Constantinople. In 1808, Ali Pasha defeated Ibrahim Pasha, incorporating its territory in the Pashalik of Janina.

== See also ==
- Ottoman Albania
- Albanian Principalities
- List of Albanian monarchs

== Sources ==
"History of Albanian People" Albanian Academy of Science. ISBN 99927-1-623-1
