= Janina vilayet =

Province of the Ottoman Empire from 1867 to 1912

ولايت يانیه Vilâyet-i Yānyâ
- Vilayet of Ottoman Empire
- 1867–1912
- Flag

- The Janina Vilayet in 1867–1912
- Capital: Yanya (Ioannina)
- Population
  - 1897: 595,108
  - 1911: 560,835
- History
  - Vilayet Law: 1867
  - First Balkan War: 1912
Preceded by	Succeeded by
Ioannina Eyalet	Kingdom of Greece; Principality of Albania
- Today part of: Albania; Greece

The Vilayet of Janina, Yanya or Ioannina (Ottoman Turkish: ولايت يانیه, romanized: Vilâyet-i Yanya) was a first-level administrative division (vilayet) of the Ottoman Empire, established in 1867. In the late 19th century, it reportedly had an area of 18,320 square kilometres (7,070 sq mi). It was created by merging the Pashalik of Yanina and the Pashalik of Berat with the sanjaks of Janina, Berat, Ergiri, Preveze, Tırhala and Kesriye. Kesriye was later demoted to kaza and bounded to Monastir Vilayet and Tırhala was given to Greece in 1881. With the end of the Ottoman rule, the southern area of the vilayed became part of Greece and its northern area became part of Albania.

== History ==
=== Albanians ===
The territory of the Janina vilayet was the central area of the Albanian Pashalik of Yanina, which under Ali Pasha of Tepelena acquired an increasingly independent status within the Ottoman Empire, until Ali Pasha's rebellion against the Porte was crushed. Thereafter, the power and autonomy acquired by the Albanian beys of the region ended when they were massacred by the Ottoman Empire in the town of Manastir in 1830, in order to prevent any potential spread of the Albanian national movement.

Janina Vilayet was one of the main centers of the cultural and political life of Albanians who lived in Janina Vilayet and Monastir Vilayet. One of the most important reasons was the influence by Greek education and culture south-Albanian writers received in the famous Greek school of Ioannina, the Zosimaia. Abdyl Frashëri, the first political ideologue of the Albanian National Awakening was one of the six deputies from Janina Vilayet in the first Ottoman Parliament in 1876–1877. Abdyl Frashëri, from Frashër, modern Albania, together with Mehmet Ali Vrioni from Berat (also in modern Albania), and some members of Ioannina's Albanian community, founded the Albanian Committee of Janina in May 1877. Frashëri fought against decisions of the Treaty of San Stefano.

=== Greeks ===
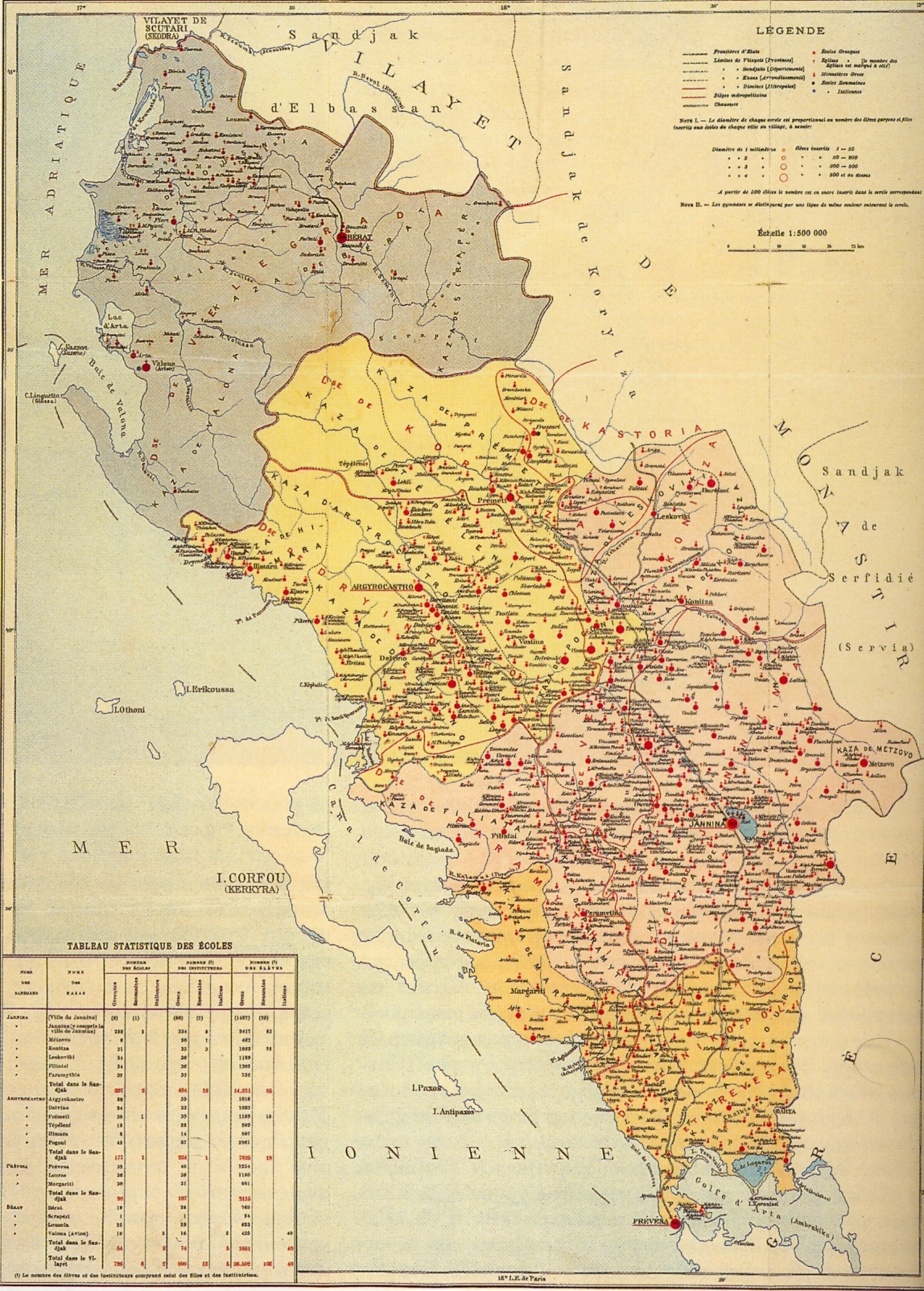
Educational institutions in Vilayet (1908): red for Greek, purple for Romanian, blue for Italian

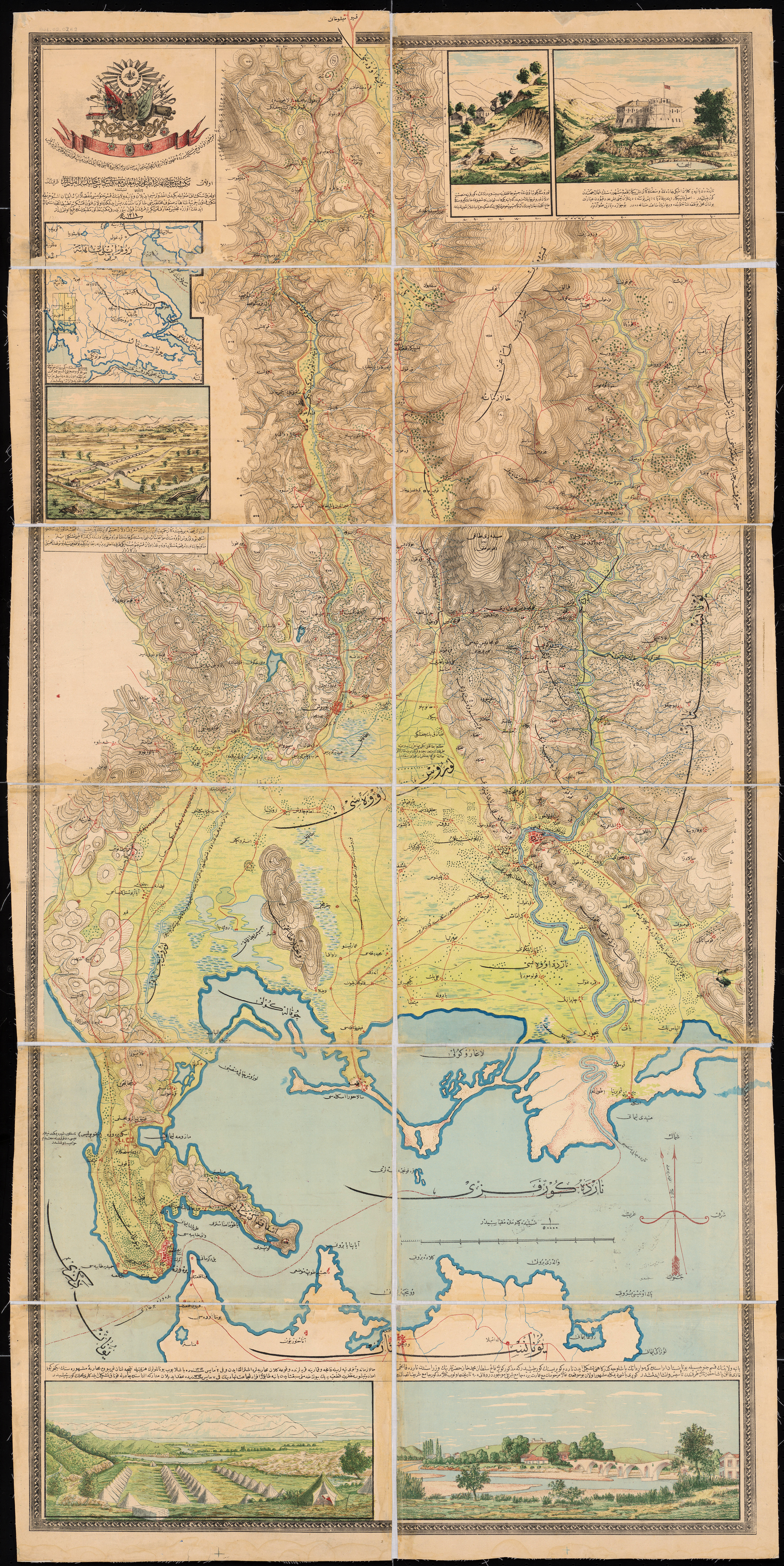
Ottoman map of the south part of the Vilayet (1896)

Although part of the local population contributed greatly to the Greek War of Independence (1821–1830), the Pashalik of Yanina did not become part of the Greek state. In 1878, a rebellion broke out with the revolutionaries, mostly local Greeks, taking control of Sarandë and Delvinë. However, it was suppressed by the Ottoman troops, who burned 20 villages of the region.

In the following year, the Greek population of Ioannina region authorized a committee in order to present to the European governments their wish for union with Greece.

In 1906 the organization Epirote Society was founded by members of the Greek diaspora, Panagiotis Danglis and Spyros Spyromilios, that aimed at the annexation of the vilayet to Greece by supplying local Greeks with firearms.

=== End of Ottoman rule ===
During the Albanian Revolt of 1912 Janina Vilayet was proposed as one of four vilayets consisting Albanian Vilayet. The Ottoman government ended the Albanian revolts by accepting almost all demands of Albanian rebels on September 4, 1912, which included the formation of the vilayet later in 1912.

Following the First Balkan War of 1912–1913 and the Treaty of London the southern part of the vilayet, including Ioannina, was incorporated into Greece. Greece had also seized the northern part of the vilayet during the Balkan Wars, but the Treaty of Bucharest, which concluded the Second Balkan War, assigned it to Albania.

== Demographics ==
The vilayet of Janina was ethnically, linguistically and culturally diverse.

There have been a number of estimates about the ethnicity and the religious affiliation of the local population. The Ottoman Empire classified and counted its citizens according to religion and not ethnicity, which led to inefficient censuses and lack of classification of populations according to their ethnic groups. The vilayet was predominantly inhabited by Albanians and Greeks, while the major religions were Islam and Christian Orthodoxy. The districts of Janina which were later incorporated into Greece were heavily Greek.

According to the 1890/91 Ottoman Yearly report, the vilayet of Janina had 512,812 inhabitants, of which 44% were Muslims, 48% were orthodox Christians 7% were Aromanians, and 0.7% were Jewish. Orthodox Albanians constituted for 52% of the Orthodox population, whilst Greeks constituted 48% of the Orthodox population. Albanians accounted for 69% of the population whilst Greeks accounted for 23% of it.

According to Aram Andonyan and Zavren Biberyan in 1908 of a total population of 648,000, 315,000 inhabitants were Albanians, most of which were Muslims and Orthodox, and some who were adherents of Roman Catholicism. Aromanians and Greeks were about 180,000 and 110,000 respectively. Smaller communities included Bulgarians, Turks, Romanis and Jews.

According to Tom Winnifrith and Eleftheria Nikolaidou the Ottoman statistics of 1908 after the recognition of the Aromanian community provide the following figures per ethnic group: out of a total population of 550,000 the Greeks were the most numerous (300,000), followed by Albanians (210,000), Aromanians (25,000) and the Jewish community (3,000). Nikolaidou adds that the sanjaks of Janina, Preveza and Gjirokastër were predominantly Greek, the sanjak of Igoumenitsa (then Gümeniçe, Reşadiye between 1909 and 1913 to honour Mehmet V) had a slight majority of Greeks, and that of Berat north was predominantly Albanian. According to her the official Ottoman statistics in the Vilayet of Janina had the tendency to favor the Albanian element at the expense of the Greek one. Winnifrith considers the Ottoman statistics of 1908 as unreliable. He states that a decline of the population is noticeable in these figures as a result of emigration to Greece and America, while the Aromanian figure appears small.

Heraclides & Kromidha (2023) argue that Albanians were the majority in the whole vilayet with 2/3 of Albanians being Muslims, while Christian Orthodox Greeks formed a strong minority. Albanians were dominant in the north and center of the vilayet, and Greeks dominant in the south.

According to Sir Hamilton Alexander Rosskeen Gibb in 1895 there were c. 224,000 Muslims. The Orthodox population included c. 118,000 Greeks (partly of Albanian origin, Hellenized over a century by Greek religious and educational institutions) and c. 129,500 Albanians, and the Jewish population amounted to 3,500 people. According to Zafer Golen two-thirds of the population were Albanian Muslims, while according to Dimitrios Chasiotis c. 419,403 of the total population were Greeks, along with 239,000 Turks and Albanians, and 6,000 Jews. Lontos estimated that 3/4 of the population was Christian.

Ottoman Official statistic of 1893 & 1911
Group	1893		1911
Group	Number	%	Number	%
Orthodox ("Greeks") (Note: Under the Ottoman classification system, all Orthodox Christians were classified as "Greeks", and all Muslims were classified as "Turks" - regardless of ethnic affiliation.)	286,304	55.43	311,032	55.46
Muslims ("Turks")	225,415	43.64	244,638	43.62
Jews	3,677	0.71	3,990	0.71
Catholics	83	0.02	-
Other	997	0.19	1,175	0.21
Total	516,476	100.00	560,835	100.00

Non-official estimates of Yanya Vilayet
Ethnicity	1890-91 (Dushku)		1895 (Gibb)		1908 (Andonyan & Biberyan)		1908 (Nikolaidou)
Ethnicity	Number	%	Number	%	Number	%	Number	%
Albanians	353,840	69.00	129,517 - 353,495	25.26 - 68.93	315,000	48.61	210,000	37.63
Greeks	117,947	23.00	118,033	23.02	110,000	16.98	300,000	53.76
Aromanians	35,897	7.00			180,000	27.78	25,000	4.48
Turks			0 - 223,885	0.00 - 43.66	10,000	1.54	20,000	3.58
Bulgarians					20,000	3.09
Romani					7,000	1.08
Jews	3,590	0.70	3,517	0.69	6,000	0.93	3,000	0.54
Total	512,812	100.00	474,952	100.00	648,000	100.00	558,000	100.00

== Administrative divisions ==
Sanjaks of the Vilayet:

1. Sanjak of Ioannina (Yanya, Aydonat, Filat, Maçova, Leskovik, Koniçe)
2. Sanjak of Ergiri (Ergiri, Delvine, Sarandoz, Premedi, Fraşer, Tepedelen, Kurvelesh, Himara)
3. Sanjak of Preveze (Preveze, Loros, Margliç)
4. Sanjak of Berat (Berat, Avlonya, Loşine, Fir)

== See also ==
- Pashalik of Yanina
- Pashalik of Berat

== Sources ==
- Clogg, R. (2002). A Concise History of Greece. London: Cambridge University Press. ISBN 0-521-00479-9.
