= Sanjak of Preveza =

Former province of Epirus

Sanjak of Preveza سنجاق پره‌وزه Σαντζάκι Πρεβέζης
- Sanjak of the Ottoman Empire
- 1863–1915
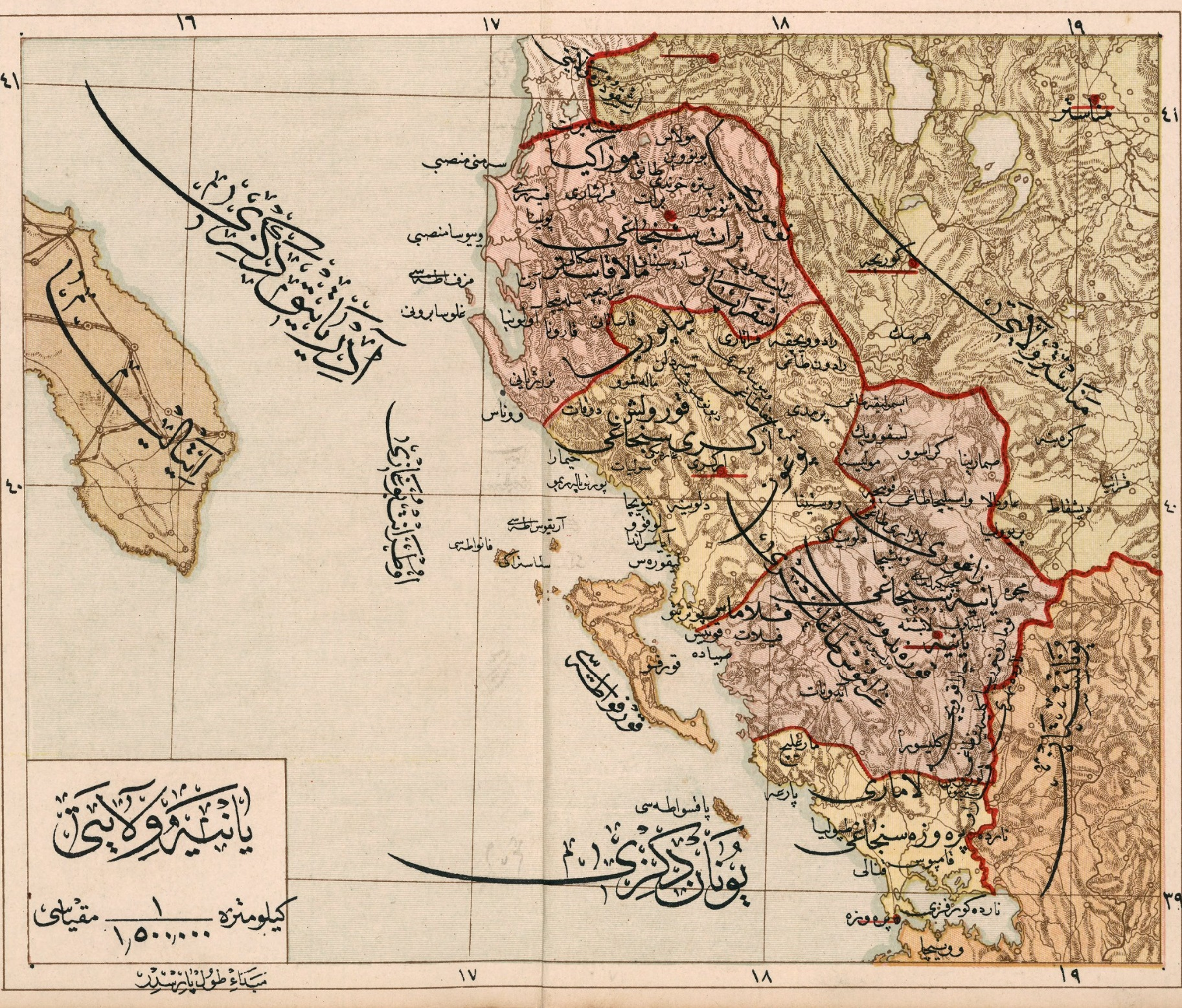
- 1907 Ottoman map of the Vilayet of Ioannina, with the Sanjak of Preveza in the bottom
- Capital: Preveza
- History
  - Established: 1863
  - First Balkan War: 1912–1913
  - Establishment of Preveza Prefecture: 1915
Preceded by	Succeeded by
Sanjak of Ioannina	Preveza Prefecture
- Today part of: Greece

The Sanjak of Preveza (Ottoman Turkish: سنجاق پره‌وزه, Sancağı-i Preveze; Greek: Σαντζάκι Πρεβέζης, Santzáki Prevézis), also once known as the Liva of Preveza (لواء پره‌وزه, Livâ-i Preveze; Λιβάς Πρεβέζης, Livás Prevézis), was a sanjak of the Ottoman Empire named for its capital at Preveza in southern Epirus, now part of northwestern Greece. The sanjak existed from its formation in 1863 until its conquest in the First Balkan War and reorganization in 1915 as the Preveza Prefecture of the Kingdom of Greece.

== History ==
Preveza and its surroundings had been part of the Republic of Venice's Ionian Islands until the treaties ending the War of the First Coalition ceded them to the French First Republic in 1797. The French occupation was short lived. Ali Pasha of Ioannina conquered the town in 1798 and made it part of his de facto independent Pashalik of Yanina until his fall in 1822.

Preveza was a kaza of the Sanjak and Eyalet of Ioannina until 1863, when the provincial yearbook (salname) recorded it as a separate sanjak within the province. The next year in 1864 the sanjak was transferred to the new Eyalet of Tirhala but a short time later in 1867 the Vilayet Law promulgated as part of the continuing Tanzimat reforms merged Tirhala into the new Vilayet of Ioannina. During this reorganization, the former Sanjak of Narda around present-day Arta was added to Preveza Sanjak.

Following the Great Eastern Crisis in the 1870s, the Ottoman Empire conceded to the 1881 Convention of Constantinople to avoid continued revolts and war with Greece and possibly others. The sanjak's Kaza of Arta was ceded to Greece but the kazas of Louros and Preveza itself remained part of the empire.

During the First Balkan War of 1912–1913, the sanjak was occupied by the Greek Army but the new Governorate of Epirus kept the Ottoman administration and officials in place until Preveza Prefecture was established by the Royal Decree of 3/16 March 1915. The Ottoman kazas were renamed subgovernates (υποδιοικήσεις, ypodioikíseis) and overseen by governate commissioners (διοικητικοί επίτροποι, dioikitikoí epítropoi) nominated by the governor-general of Epirus in Ioannina. The Kaza of Margariti was merged with Preveza in the process.
