= Pashalik of Yanina =

Autonomous province of the Ottoman Empire

- 1787–1822
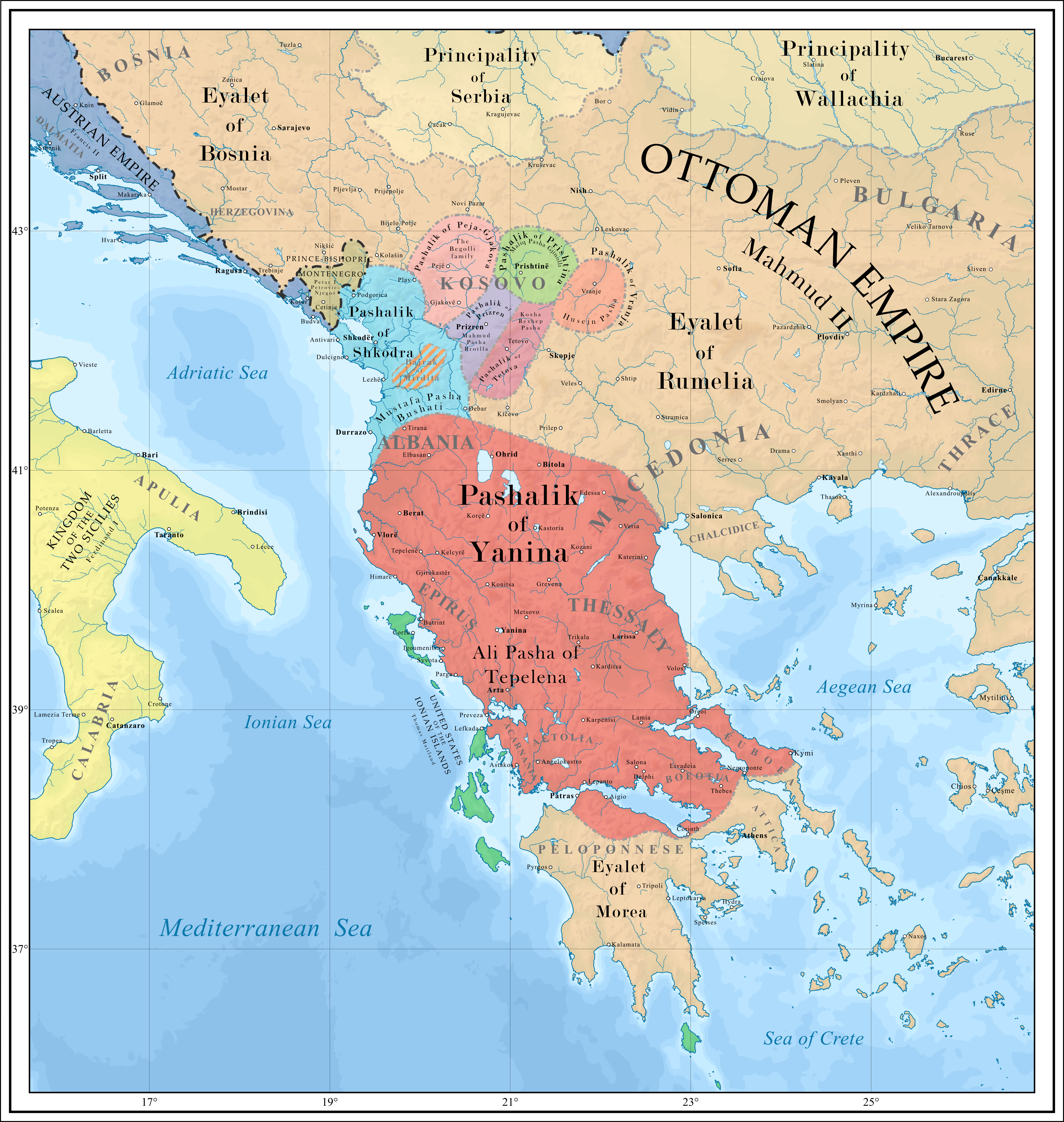
- Albanian Pashaliks, 1815-1821. The Pashalik of Yanina is colored in red (excluding the Morea Eyalet).
- Status: Autonomous province of the Ottoman Empire, de facto independent (Note: "... Ali Pasha, by using a skillful blend of diplomacy and terror, kept his region virtually independent until 1822.")
- Capital: Yanina; 39°40′N 20°51′E
- Common languages: Greek (majority); Albanian; Ottoman Turkish; Aromanian; Bulgarian
- Religion: Islam (official); Sunni Islam; Bektashism (among elite); Eastern Orthodoxy (majority)
- Government: Pashalik
- Pasha
  - 1787 – 1822: Ali Pasha
- Historical era: Early modern period
  - Established: 1787
  - Disestablished: 1822
Preceded by	Succeeded by
Ioannina Eyalet; Pashalik of Berat	Ioannina Eyalet

The Pashalik of Yanina, sometimes referred to as the Pashalik of Ioannina or Pashalik of Janina, was an autonomous pashalik within the Ottoman Empire between 1787 and 1822 covering large areas of Albania, Greece, and North Macedonia. Under the Ottoman Albanian ruler Ali Pasha, the pashalik acquired a high degree of autonomy and even managed to stay de facto independent, though this was never officially recognized by the Ottoman Empire. Conceiving his territory in increasingly independent terms, Ali Pasha's correspondence and foreign Western correspondence frequently refer to the territories under Ali's control as Albania.

The capital of the Pashalik was Ioannina, which along with Tepelena were Ali's headquarters. At its peak, Ali Pasha and his sons ruled over southern and central Albania, the majority of mainland Greece, including Epirus, Thessaly, West Macedonia, western Central Macedonia, Continental Greece (excluding Attica), and the Peloponnese, and parts of southwestern North Macedonia around Ohrid and Manastir. The subject population of Ali's domains was quite heterogeneous, including Albanians, Aromanians, Bulgarians, Greeks, Jews, Roma, Serbs, and Turks. Greeks were the most numerous ethnic group, while Orthodox Christians were the most numerous religious group, followed by Muslims.

== Background ==
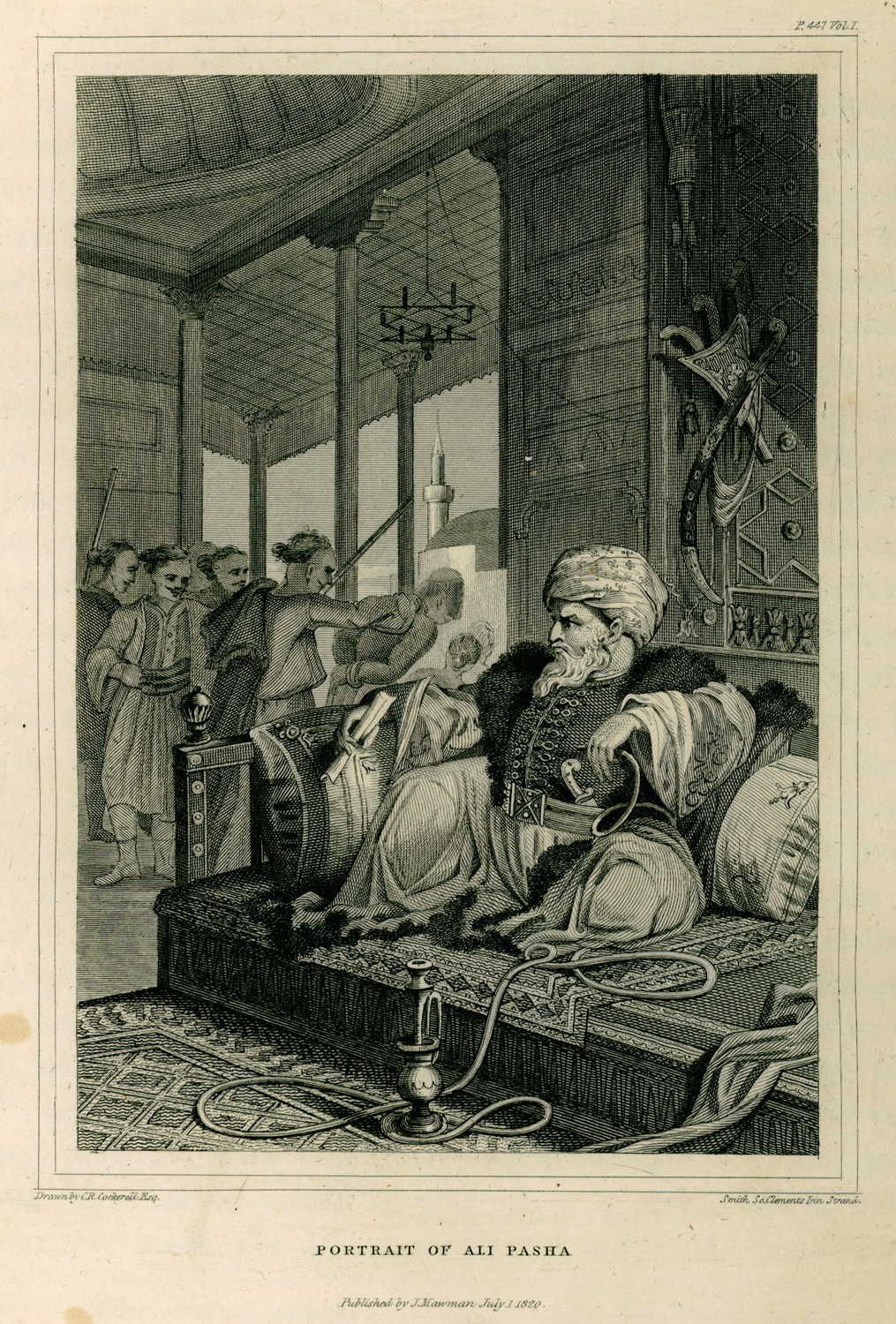
Portrait of Ali Pasha, drawn by Charles Robert Cockerell (published in 1820), based on Thomas Smart Hughes' travels in Albania in 1813.

Ali Pasha first came to power as when he was appointed mutasarrıf of Ioanninna at the end of 1784 or beginning of 1785, but was soon dismissed, returning to the position only at the end of 1787 or the start of 1788. Ali gained control of Delvina and became ruler of the Sanjak of Delvina in 1785, but did not have control full control of the Sanjak, with the regions of Himara (1797) and Gjirokastër (1811) being taken later. Additionally, the regions of Margariti and Paramythia, which fell within Sanjak of Delvina, and Fanari, within the Sanjak of Ioannina (conquered later by Ali), were ruled by Cham Albanian landlords, such as Hasan Çapari, who remained in conflict with Ali Pasha throughout much of the Pashalik's existence.

In 1787 Ali Pasha took control of the Sanjak of Trikala (Thessaly), which was later officially rewarded to him for his support for the sultan's war against Austria. Shortly afterwards, in 1787 or 1788, he seized control of the town of Ioannina and declared himself ruler of the sanjak, which remained his power base for the next 34 years. This marked the beginning of the Pashalik of Yanina, with Ali self-appointing himself Pasha of Yanina and delegating the title of Pasha of Trikala to his son, Veli. At this point, the Sanjaks of Delvina, Trikala, and Yanina composed the Pashalik.

Like other semi-independent regional leaders that emerged in that time, such as Osman Pazvantoğlu, he took advantage of a weak Ottoman government to expand his territory until he gained de facto control over much of Albania and mainland Greece, either directly or through his sons. Ali's own perception of group identity derived from the ancient legacy of Albanian banditry along with the accompanying Albanian pseudo-nobility. Ali conceived an independent state that almost certainly would have been controlled by this Albanian military and aristocratic elite. As Pasha, Ali was supported by an exclusively Albanian military establishment, which included many people who had undertaken brigandage activities earlier in their life. Ali Pasha also used Albanian tribesmen to put down Greek rebellions in the Morea.

Language was a major definiting element in Ali's identity, as well of his government and the region he controlled in general. Ali's native language was Albanian. His degree of proficiency in written Greek is debatable, however he also spoke Greek. Albanians and Greeks exchanging languages was quite common in the 18th century. Ioannina was located in a largely Greek-speaking area, and during the Ottoman rule the Albanian language has not been officially recognized. Albanian has become a fully written language with its own script only from the mid-19th century, while written Greek was a well established language within the Ottoman Empire. The formal bureaucratic language of the Empire was entirely replaced with Greek in the pashalik, and in Ali's court diplomatic business was exclusively conducted in Greek as well as much of the formal correspondence. Ali also used the Greek script to write in Albanian and to transliterate Turkish in his personal correspondence. The usage of Greek, however, did not in any way make Ali Greek, just as his role as Ottoman appointee did not in any way make him Ottoman. He was first and foremost considered as an Albanian.

The principal role of geography in the communal groups of his time were comprehended by Ali. He insisted that Ioannina, located in the Greek district of Epirus, was Albanian. He also considered the Albanian population who lived in the area not as immigrants but as indigenous people of the region. He tried to justify his plans on the territories under foreign protectorate on the Ionian coast also by insisting that they were part of "Albania" as well. The majority of the population ruled by Ali Pasha were Greek.

== History ==
=== Rise ===
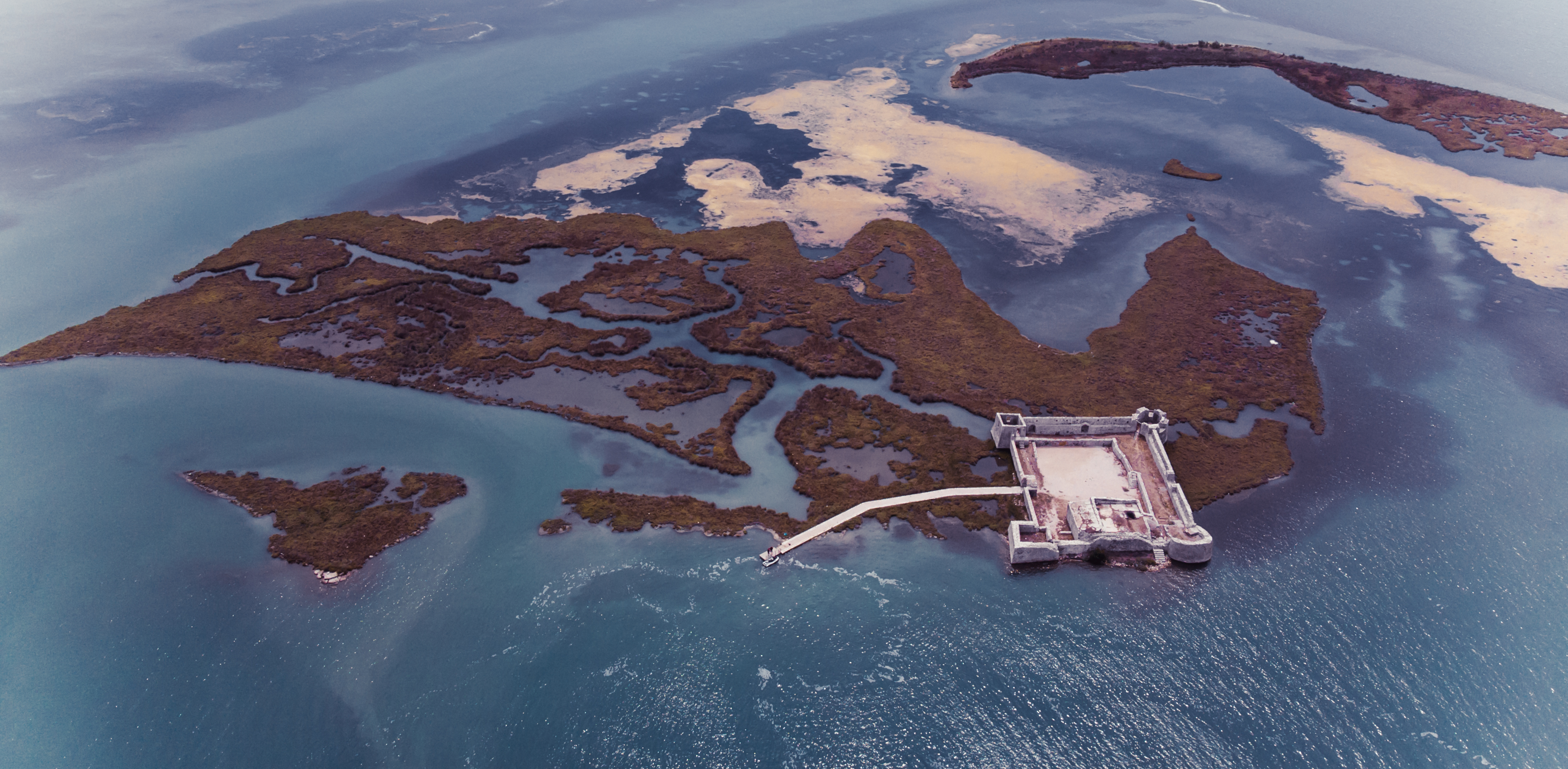
Fortifications built during Ali Pasha's reign in Butrint, Albania.

Taking advantage of another Russo-Turkish War starting in 1787, Ali annexed the regions of Konitsa (in the Sanjak of Ioannina), and Libohovë, Përmet and Tepelenë (from the Sanjak of Avlona) to the Pashalik during the years 1789 to 1791. During this period, he also purchased Arta, giving the Pashalik access to the shores of the Ionian Sea via the Gulf of Arta. In 1789, the Aromanian town of Moscopole, within the Sanjak of Elbasan, was sacked and destroyed. Also in 1789, Ali first invaded the semi-independent Souliote Confederacy to the west of the Sanjak of Ioannina, following their mobilisation of 2,200 Souliotes in March 1789 against the Pashalik and the Muslims of Rumelia. A second campaign against the Souliotes took place in 1790. During these two campaigns, the Pashalik captured some Parasouli settlements, but ultimately was repulsed from the core Souli region.

Starting in 1788, Ali had attempted to take control of the Sanjak of Karli-Eli, finally invading in October 1789. The Ottoman government reacted by granting the entire sanjak of Karli-Eli (minus the voevodalik of Missolonghi) as a personal hass to Mihrişah Valide Sultan, the mother of Sultan Selim III, which prevented Ali Pasha from annexing the territory. The Sanjak was eventually taken in 1806, following the death of Mihrişah the previous year.

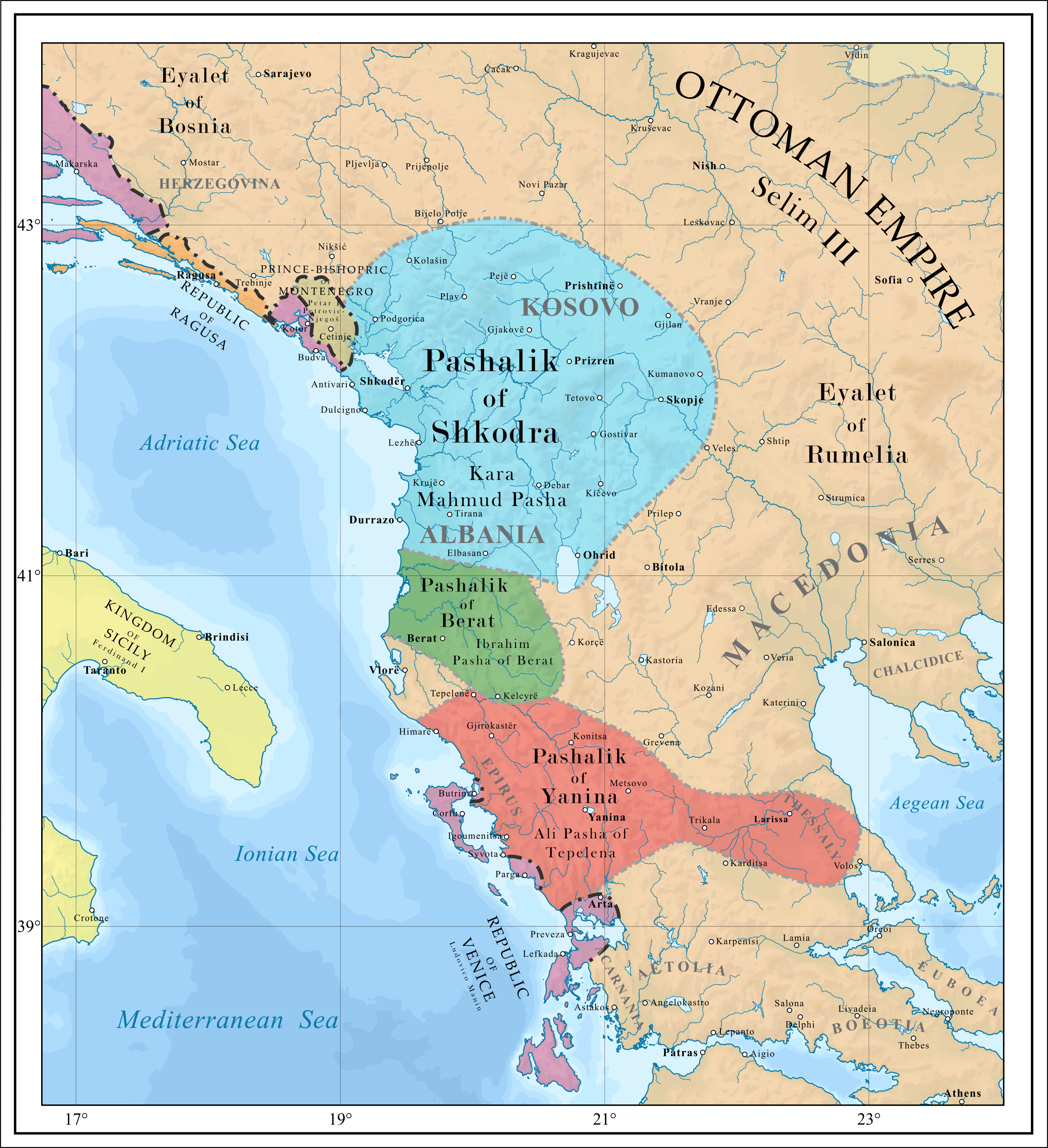
The Pashalik of Yanina in 1790-1795 (in red).

Following the end of the Russo-Turkish War in 1792, Ali ceased his expansions in order to avoid repercussions from Sultan Selim III. Additionally, his forces took part formally on the side of the Porte in a campaign against Shkodër in 1793. Despite the conclusion of the Russo-Turkish War and the expansion of his territories, the Pashalik's defeat against the Souliotes resulted in Ali's obsession with capturing the Confederacy. He launched another campaign in July 1792, dispatching 8,000-10,000 Albanians from the Pashalik to take the territory, with the Souliotes raising 1,300 men, but were defeated again. A peace agreement was made, with prisoners and hostages being exchanged and Parasouli villages captured in the previous two years being returned to the Souliotes.

During the Yanina-Souli conflict, the Himariotes had supported the Souliotes. In revenge, Ali Pasha led a raid against the town of Himara in 1797, and more than 6,000 civilians were slaughtered.

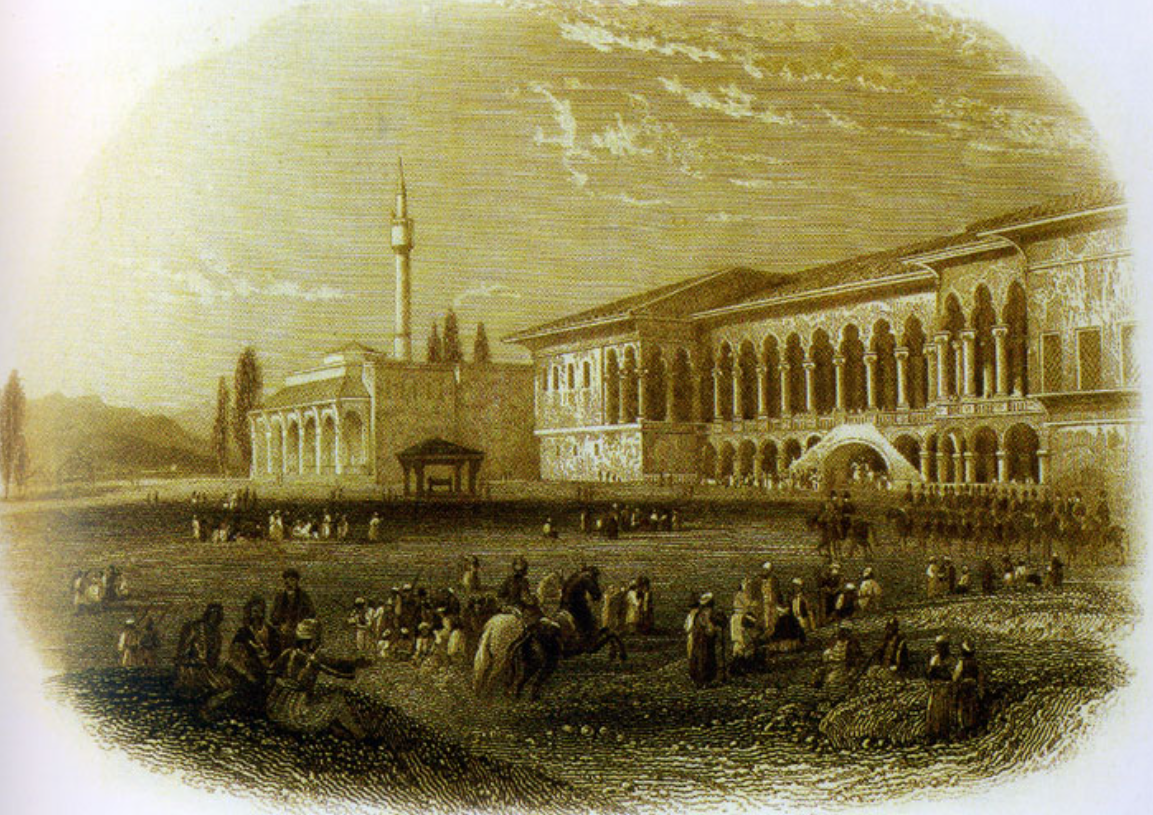
The Palace of Ali Pasha in Tepelena, engraving by Edward Finden, based on a drawing by William Purser, early 19th century.

In 1797, France conquered Venice and gained from it control over the Ionian Islands and several coastal possessions in Epirus (Parga, Preveza, Vonitsa, Butrinto, and Igoumenitsa), making them neighbours to the Pashalik. In order to gain further access to the Ionian Sea, Ali formed an alliance with Napoleon I of France that same year, who had established Francois Pouqueville as his general consul in Yanina. He received ammunition and military advisors from the French. Napoleon, at a certain point, had promised Ali the position of "King of Albania", but it became increasingly clear that this was not going to occur. British traveller Henry Holland, who had conversations with Ali Pasha, remarked that Ali was not convinced by the offer, because he distrusted the French. In 1798 the Ottoman Empire went to war with France following their invasion of Egypt. Ali Pasha responded by seizing the French coastal territories of Butrint and Igoumenitsa (added to the Sanjak of Delvina), Preveza (added to the Sanjak of Ioannina), and Vonitsa, with Parga remaining as the sole French possession in mainland Greece. The French garrison in Preveza was destroyed in the Battle of Nicopolis, which was followed by a massacre. Following the capture of Preveza, Ali secured the neutrality of the Souliotes (who were dependent on French-controlled Preveza and Parga for livestock and ammunition supplies) through bribing of their leaders, which also caused internal conflict among the Souliote clans. A combined Russian-Ottoman force captured the Ionian Islands during 1799–1800, resulting in the establishment of the Septinsular Republic.

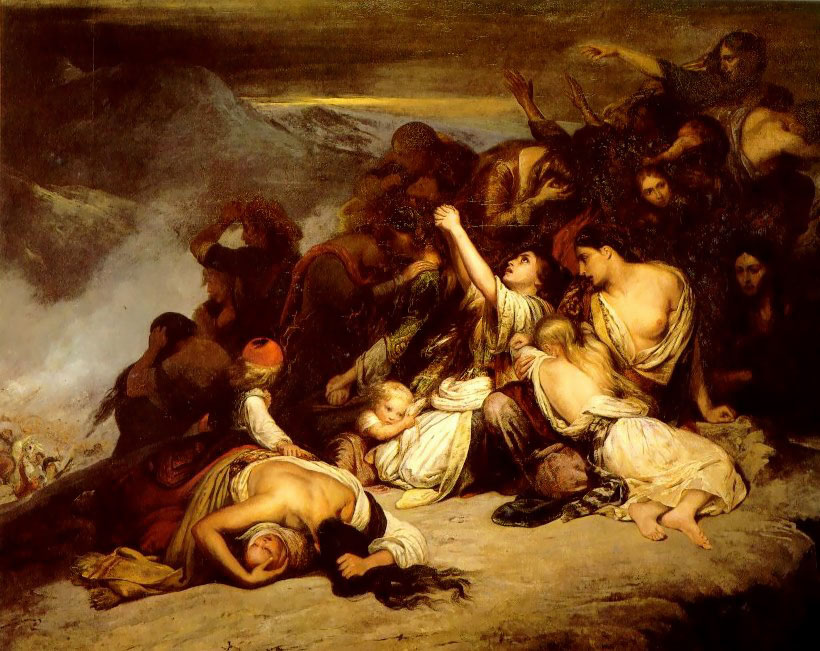
The Women of Souli by Ary Scheffer (1795–1858).

By 1799, the Pashalik was engaged in rivalry with the Pashalik of Berat to the north, which, like the Pashalik of Yanina, was also largely independent. Additionally, within the Pashalik there were several semi-independent regions that posed a threat to Ali Pasha's rule: the region of Delvina, in the north of Sanjak of Delvina; Chameria, in the south of Sanjak of Delvina and spilling into the Sanjak of Ioannina; and the Souliote Confederacy, to the west of the Sanjak of Ioannina. The Russians quickly sought to weaken the Pashalik's influence in the region, showing support for the aforementioned regions. Ali Pasha responded that same year by temporarily subduing the beys of three of the regions (Berat, Delvina, and Chameria). He additionally annexed the neighbouring region Himara to the Sanjak of Delvina and established good relations with the Himariotes. He financed various public works and churches, and built a large church opposite of Porto Palermo Castle.

Following this, a campaign was launched against the Souliotes in Autumn 1799, but this presumably failed. Another campaign was mounted in June–July 1800, with the Pashalik raising 11,500 men. However, a direct assault on the Souliote Confederacy failed, resulting in Ali besieging the core Souli villages by separating the Souli and Parasouli territories. For two years, the Souliotes were able to resist the siege by smuggling supplies from Parga, Paramythia, and Margariti. The Souliotes additionally requested aid from the Septinsular Republic, but Ali responded by threatening the Republic's possession of Parga. Aid was later provided in secret in 1803. In April 1802, a French corvette in Parga supplied the Souliotes with food, weapons and ammunition, providing a pretext for a new campaign by Ali against the Souliotes. Other Souliot clans had left Souli and integrated into Ali Pasha's order as early as 1799-1800. In 1800, George Botsaris (grandfather of Markos Botsaris) received a large sum and the position of the armatolos of Tzoumerka, and the Botsaris clan left Souli and settled in Vourgareli of Arta. This was the first time that a Souliot clan officially became part of the Ottoman political system. The departure of the Botsaris clan weakened Souli as they were a significant part of its force.

Following four years of conflict, in 1803 Ali Pasha raised Albanian forces from Epirus and Southern Albania for a final assault on the Souli Confederacy. At this point, the situation in Souli was dire due to a lack of supplies. The Souliote War of 1803 resulted in the conquest of the entire Souliote territory and its incorporation into the Pashalik, with expulsions and atrocities against the remaining Souliotes. Some Souliotes fled to Parga, but were forced to cross the sea into the Septinsular Republic in March 1804 after Ali threatened to attack the city. Earlier, in November 1803, a treaty was signed between the Pashalik of Yanina and the Septinsular Republic.

Anxious to expand its influence to the Greek mainland, Russia signed alliances with Himariot and Cham Albanian beys on 27 June 1804, who were rivals to Ali Pasha. Additionally, Russia mobilised Souliot refugees in the Septinsular Republic for an offensive against the Pashalik, but this was cut short when Ali Pasha learned of the Russian plans and an Ottoman naval squadron made an unexpected appearance off Corfu.

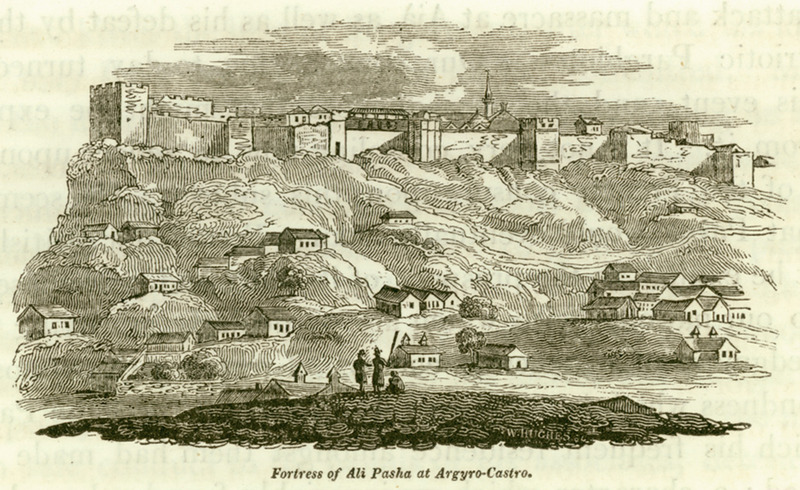
Fortress of Ali Pasha at Argyro-Castro in 1813, drawn by Charles Robert Cockerell, published in 1820 by Thomas Smart Hughes.

Because of Ali Pasha's aggressive expansions, a rift formed between the Pashalik and the Ottoman Empire. As a result, Ali sought to ally himself to foreign European powers. In 1806, Ali again entered into an alliance with Napoleon I after being promised Corfu and its straits, and again became enemies with Russia at the start of another Russo-Turkish War in 1806. However, these promises were not fulfilled and so relations between the Pashalik and France later ended.

In 1806, Ali sent forces under the command of his sons Veli Pasha and Muhtar Pasha to aid the Ottoman effort in defeating the First Serbian Uprising in the Sanjak of Smederevo. In 1813, the rebellion was crushed by the Ottoman army, mostly composed Bosnians, from the Pashalik of Bosnia, and Albanians, from the Pashaliks of Scutari and Yanina.

In 1807, following the entry of the Septinsular Republic (a nominally Ottoman vassal) into the latest Russo-Turkish War on the side of Russia, Ali sent forces under Veli Pasha to attack the Republic. Lefkada was assaulted in Spring 1807, with the backing of Napoleon, and Santa Maura besieged, but the defenders, reinforced by Souliote and Russian forces, repelled the Pashalik's forces.

After the Treaty of Tilsit in July 1807, Napoleon granted Alexander I, Emperor of Russia, his plan to dismantle the Ottoman Empire, and in exchange Russia ceded the Ionian Islands and Parga to France, reestablishing French rule. As a result, Ali allied himself with the British. His machinations were permitted by the Ottoman government in Constantinople from a mixture of expediency – it was deemed better to have Ali as a semi-ally than as an enemy – and weakness, as the central government did not have enough strength to oust him at that time.

Between 1807 and 1812, Veli ruled as Pasha of Morea, and at an unknown date Muhtar became Pasha of Inebahti, resulting in both regions being incorporated into the Pashalik.

As relations with France deteriorated, Ali Pasha sought the capture of Parga, the last settlement in Epirus not under his control. In response, the French twice made plans to invade the Pashalik. The first, chronicled by Theodoros Kolokotronis, involved using the Albanian Regiment, supported by French artillery and Cham Albanians recruited by Ali Farmaki, to invade Morea, which at the time (around 1809) was part of the Pashalik under the rule of Veli Pasha. In his place they would install a mixed Christian-Muslim government, while the French mediated with the Porte to secure its approval. According to Kolokotronis, the plan was to be carried out in 1809, but was thwarted by the British occupation of French-held Zakynthos, Cephalonia, Kythira, and Ithaca that same year.

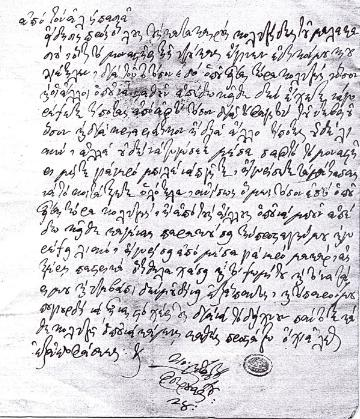
A Firman issued by Ottoman Albanian ruler Ali Pasha in 1810 and written in vernacular Greek. Ali used Greek for all his courtly dealings.

The second attempt involved a detachment of 25 men of the Albanian Regiment, under Lt. Colonel Androutsis, who were sent to aid a Himariot revolt against Ali Pasha's forces in October 1810. Their ship foundered near Porto Palermo, however, and when attacked by Ali's forces, they were captured and taken prisoner to Ioannina.

The poet George Gordon Byron, 6th Baron Byron visited Ali's court in Tepelena and Yanina in 1809 and recorded the encounter in his work Childe Harold. He evidently had mixed feelings about the despot, noting the splendour of Ali's court and some Orthodox cultural revival that he had encouraged in Yanina, which Byron described as being "superior in wealth, refinement and learning" to any other Albanian town. In a letter to his mother, however, Byron deplored Ali's cruelty: "His Highness is a remorseless tyrant, guilty of the most horrible cruelties, very brave, so good a general that they call him the Mahometan Buonaparte ... but as barbarous as he is successful, roasting rebels, etc.."

In 1809, Ali Pasha invaded the Pashalik of Berat, ruled by fellow Albanian Pashalik, Ibrahim Pasha. Against the forces of Ibrahim Pasha and his brother Sephir Bey, ruler of Avlona, Ali sent Armatoles from Thessaly. After villages had been burnt, peasants robbed and hanged, and flocks carried off on both sides, peace was made. Ali married his sons Muhtar Pasha and Veli Pasha to Ibrahim's daughters, and the territories of the Pashalik of Berat passed to Muhtar as a dowry. Muhtar became governor of much of Central Albania and part of western Macedonia, resulting in a further expansion of the Pashalik of Yanina. As Sephir bey had displayed qualities which might prove formidable hereafter, Ali contrived to have him poisoned by a physician; and, in his usual fashion, he hanged the agent of the crime, that no witness might remain of it. Ali Pasha had designs to defeat the Pasha of Berat, become vizir of Epirus, fight with the Sultan, and take Constantinople.

=== Consolidating power (1809–1820) ===
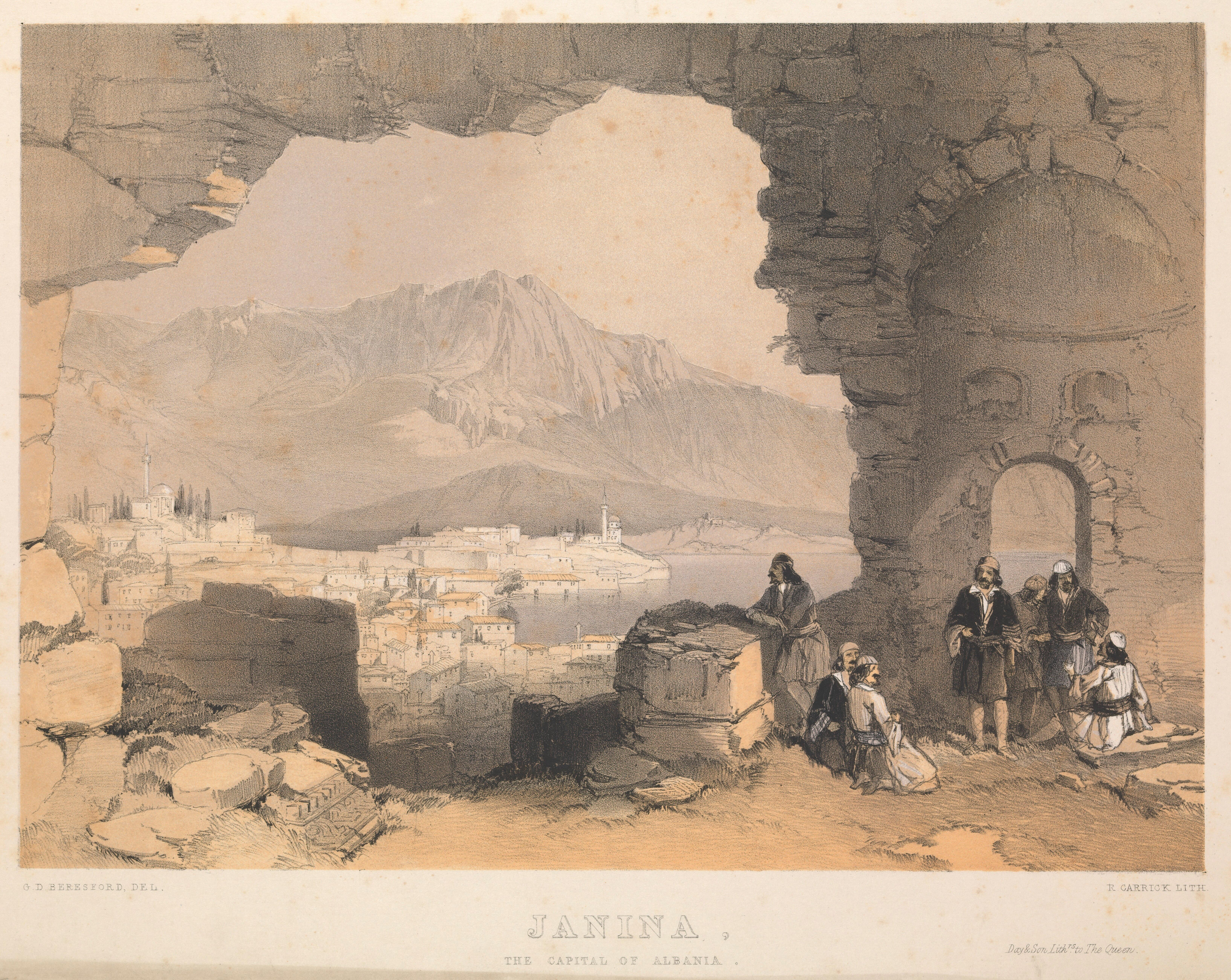
Janina, the capital of Albania, lithograph by George de la Poer Beresford, 1855.

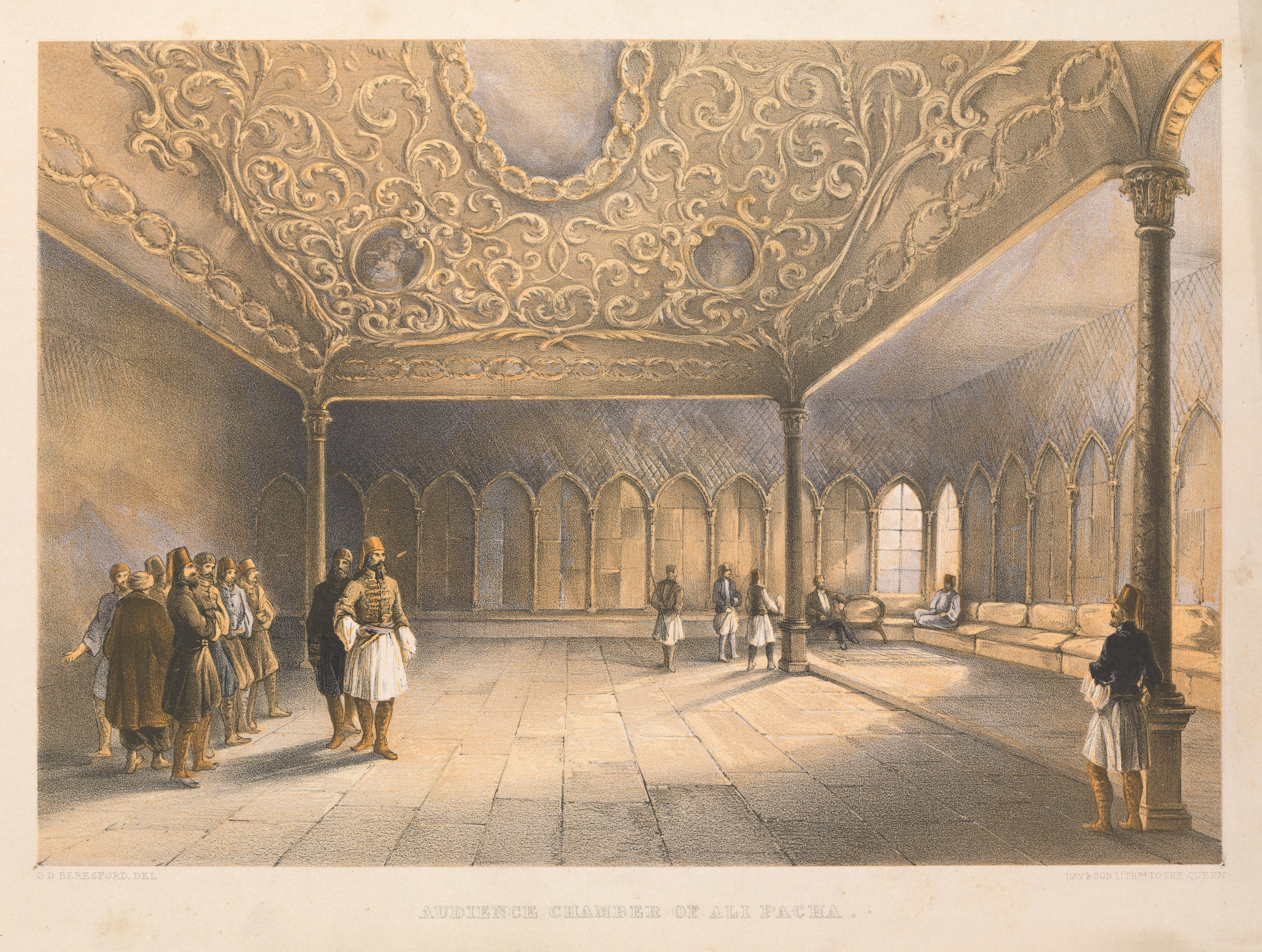
Audience chamber of Ali Pacha, lithograph by George de la Poer Beresford, 1855.

Despite French opposition, Ali seized control of the remainder of the Sanjak of Avlona in 1810, following the assassination of Sephir Bey. In 1811, the region of Delvina was reconquered, and the region of Gjirokastër annexed, resulting in the complete annexation of the Sanjak of Delvina. At this point, the Pashalik consisted of the entirety of Southern Albania, Epirus (excluding Parga), and Thessaly, as well as the majority of Central Albania and small parts of Macedonia, with all major regional rivals having been defeated. These expansions strengthened the autonomy of the region, however a lack of foreign support meant that the Pashalik was still dependent on the Ottoman Empire. The population of the Pashalik itself was mainly Greek and Albanian, and although it was constituted by an Albanian ruling feudal class and army, Ali's power was also assured by the Greeks. Also as a result of persecution against local Sarakatsani and Aromanians several families that belonged to those communities were forced to migrate to regions outside Ali's rule.

On 15 March 1812, Ali sent Greek troops under the command of Thanasis Vagias to destroy the Muslim Albanian village of Kardhiq, after his Muslim Albanian followers had refused to do so. This action was ordered in revenge for the rape of his mother and sister, which had occurred in Kardhiq. The village was destroyed and 730 of its inhabitants killed.

In 1812 the settlement of Agia, belonging to Parga, was captured by Daut Bey, nephew of Ali Pasha. He then massacred and enslaved the local population. A siege of Parga ensued but failed, with Daut being killed during the siege.

By 1815, the British had established full control of the French territories of the Ionian Islands and Parga, establishing the United States of the Ionian Islands. In 1819, the British sold the city of Parga to Ali Pasha (the subject of Francesco Hayez's later painting The Refugees of Parga), resulting in its annexation to the Sanjak of Delvina within the Pashalik. This decision was highly unpopular among the predominantly Greek and pro-Venetian population of Parga, who refused to become Muslim subjects and decided to abandon their homes. Along with the locals, Klepht and Souliote refugees in Parga fled to nearby Corfu. Ali Pasha brought local Cham Albanians to repopulate Parga.

As a result of the most important clandestine activity in the region was carried out by the Greek underground organisation, Filiki Eteria. Its activity had spread widely throughout the towns and villages with support from both klephts and intellectuals. The Filiki Eteria had infiltrated to the heart of Ali’s administration. Moeroever, after years of subversive activity stoked by nearby Venetian, Russian and French presence, as well as a growing bourgeoisie and literate class, Epirus was fertile ground for the Greek national uprising.

=== Fall (1820–1822) ===
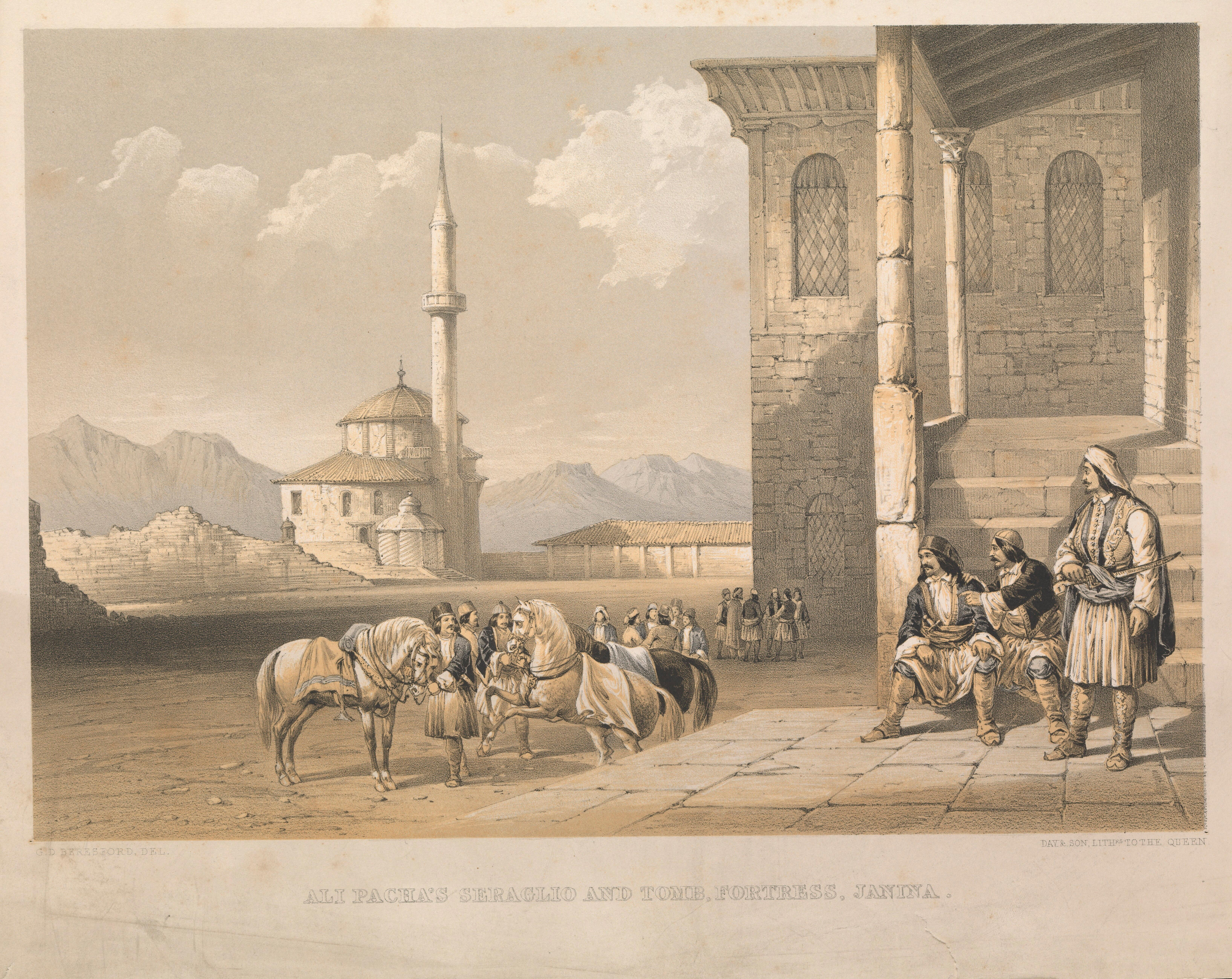
Ali Pacha's seraglio and tomb, fortress, Janina, lithograph by George de la Poer Beresford, 1855.

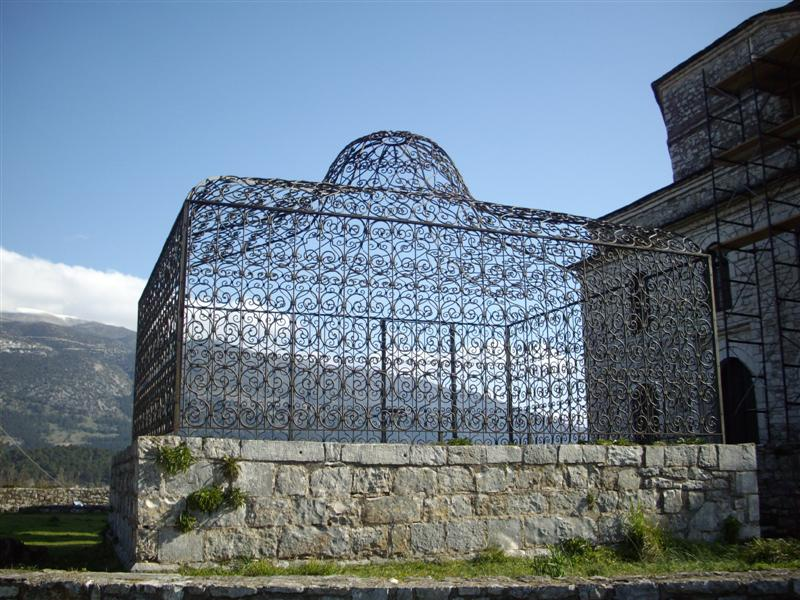
Ali Pasha's grave.

In 1820, Ali ordered the assassination of Gaskho Bey, a political opponent in Constantinople. The reformist Sultan Mahmud II, who sought to restore the authority of the Sublime Porte, took this opportunity to move against Ali by ordering his deposition. Ali refused to resign his official posts and put up a formidable resistance to Ottoman troop movements, indirectly helping the Greek Independence as some 20,000 Turkish troops were fighting Ali's formidable army.

Both sides employed Albanian mercenaries and Greeks. With the devastation many of the Greeks turned back to Ali. His spies learnt that the presence of the Souliotes had caused a rift in the imperial force, with the local beys and agas threatening to desert. On 4 December 1820, Ali Pasha's Albanian troops and the Souliotes formed an anti-Ottoman coalition, in which the Souliotes contributed 3,000 soldiers. Ali Pasha gained the support of the Souliotes by promising them the return of their lands, and in part by appealing to their shared Albanian origins. Initially the coalition was successful and managed to control most of the region, but when the Muslim Albanian troops of Ali Pasha were informed of the beginning of the Greek revolts in the Morea they abandoned it.

Meanwhile Ali knew that Greeks in his service, his secretaries Manthos Iconomou and Alexis Noutsos, the physician Ioannis Kolettis were agents of the Filiki Eteria as well as several klephts and armatoli who had been enlisted but the organization had refrained from recruiting Albanians. Meanwhile Noutsos was informing Alexandros Ypsilantis of events in Epirus as he made preparations for the uprising before openly declaring himself openly for the Greek cause in 1821.

In January 1822 Ottoman agents assassinated Ali Pasha and sent his head to the Sultan. After his death, the Pashalik was dissolved and replaced with the Ioannina Eyalet, composed of the Sanjaks of Ioannina, Avlona, Delvina, and Preveza. At its peak, the Pashalik controlled the regions of Elbasan, Ohrid, Görice, western Salonica, Avlona, Delvina, Ioannina, Trikala, Karli-Eli, Inebahti, Eğriboz, and Morea. The coastal fortresses of Porto Palermo, Saranda, Butrint, Parga, Preveza, Plagia, and Nafpaktos were controlled by Ali Pasha.

== Economy ==
The territories of the Pashalik of Yanina have been characterized by a long period of international trade, mainly with Italy, and in particular with Ancona, Venice, Livorno, and Padua. Ioannina's trade was based on exporting both valueadded and crude goods and importing western luxury items.

Ioannina's textile products had a wide trade distribution. Silk braid, blankets, scarves, gold and silver thread, and embroidered slippers and garments were among the main commercial products exported to Italy and sold throughout the Balkans. Ali by making Ioannina stronger for his own advancement had provided the Greek merchant class a platform from which to expand their perspectives and activities.

Crude goods were also widely exported from Ali Pasha's territory. There was a developed wood industry in the area, which also provided the resin that had a wide local trade. For a long period lumber from northern Epirus and southern Albania was exported from Ioannina to Toulon and used by the French for shipbuilding. The British gained control of the Ionian Islands in 1809; after then they became the major commercial partner of the region lumber trade was continued with the English. Ioannina exported fruits like lemons, oranges, and hazelnuts produced in Arta, but also olive oil, corn, and Albanian tobacco, the latter being particularly in demand for snuff. Albanian horses were sold and exported throughout the Balkans.

Ioannina also operated as the hub for the distribution of many imports from different European regions, which were brought to the capital of the Pashalik on horseback from eastern Adriatic ports such as Preveza, Vlorë, and Durrës.

== Demography ==
The population of the Pashalik of Yanina under Ali's rule was quite heterogeneous, including a multitude of ethnic groups and religious groups. Among the ethnic groups there were Greeks, Albanians, Aromanians, Bulgarians, Jews, Roma, Serbs, Turks. Among the religious groups there were Orthodox Christians, Muslims (mainly Sunni, but also Bektashi and other Sufi orders) and Jews.

The sole contemporary source specifically about the demography of Ali's state is from French diplomat and military commander Jean-Baptiste Bessières (1768 – 1813), who reported for the early 19th century that the population of the geographical space under Ali Pasha's rule consisted of 1,430,000 inhabitants, of which 748,000 were "Greeks", 662,000 "Muslims", and 20,000 "Jews". According to Hoxha (2007) "Greeks" included both ethnic Greeks and Orthodox Albanians. Extensive descriptions on the demography of the areas governed by Ali Pasha were offered by Athanasios Psalidas, counselor of Ali and leading contemporary scholar in Ioannina. Fleming (1999) asserts that the Greek Orthodox Christians were the religious majority in the region, defining themselves "Orthodox" explicitly in opposition to Catholic Christians of northern Albania, as well as to "Latins" of the later Byzantine Empire. Based on estimates by Dakin (1955) according to which the population of mainland Greece consisted of 1,500,000 "Greeks" and 150,000 "Turks" at the outbreak of the Greek War of Independence, as well as on estiamates by Colonel William Martin Leake in 1822 according to which the population of mainland Greece was in total at most one million and with a ratio of "Greeks" to "Turks" about the same ratio as Dakin's estimates, Fleming (1999) states that "Greeks" outnumbered "Turks" by ten to one in mainland Greece, which according to her was virtually all under Ali Pasha's and his sons' rule from the first decade of the 19th century, concluding that the population of Ali's territories was predominantly Greek speaking. According to Hoxha (2007) the population of Ali Pasha's state consisted mostly of Albanians and Greeks, with a minority of Aromanians and Jews. Heraclides & Kromidha (2023) consider Greeks to have been the most numerous ethnic group, because the pashalik included a large part of Central Greece, most of Thessaly, a part of central Macedonia and other parts of southern Albania and even included also Patras in the Morea.

Athanasios Psalidas, a local scholar from Yanina and adviser of Ali Pasha stated that the main ethnic-religious groups in southern Albania were: Christian Greeks, Christian Albanians and Muslim Albanians. According to Psalidas, Christian Greeks lived in most villages of Dropull valley, seven villages near Delvinë and 3 villages in Himara. Christian Albanians lived in the regions of Lunxhëria and Zagoria, in part of the villages of Himara, Delvinë, Përmet and Kolonjë and in 20 villages in Korçë, while southern Albania outside these villages and regions was almost entirely composed of Muslim Albanians. A region which straddled the modern Albania-Greek border in the era of Psalidas was Chameria which included the modern prefectures of Thesprotia (Greece), part of Sarandë and Delvinë districts. For Psalidas, this region was inhabited by Albanians (Christians and Muslims) and Christian Greeks, the latter being the more numerous population. Hoxha stated that in the regions of southern Albania and Chameria the Albanians were the dominant population, and there were also Aromanians, a small number of Greeks (mainly in the Dropull valley and villages of Himara) and few Turks and Jews. Ioannina and its surrounding areas were largely Greek speaking, but there was a large mixture of Albanians, Greeks, Aromanians and a considerable number of Jews. Greek was the language of the great majority of Ali's subjects in central Greece and the Morea. Spreading of Albanians into Greece and Macedonia occurred through the advantage they gained during the authority of the Albanian ruler Ali Pasha.

Through Greek educational efforts from the mid-19th century in Greece, especially in the areas which composed the Pashalik of Yanina until 1822 the Albanian population, which was for a large part Orthodox Christian, experienced a substantial Hellenization.

== See also ==
- Albania under the Ottoman Empire
- Greece under the Ottoman Empire
- Albanian Pashaliks
- Pashalik of Berat
- Pashalik of Scutari

== Sources ==
- Anemodoura, Maria (2020). "Πολιτικές και οικονομικές δομές στην επικράτεια του Αλή πασά Τεπεντελενλή. Από τον "Ανατολικό Δεσποτισμό" έως τη νεωτερικότητα". Pergamos - Library and Information Center of National and Kapodistrian University of Athens.
- Doxiadis, Evdoxios (2018). State, Nationalism, and the Jewish Communities of Modern Greece. Bloomsbury Publishing. ISBN 978-1-4742-6347-4.
- Fleming, Katherine Elizabeth (1999). The Muslim Bonaparte: diplomacy and orientalism in Ali Pasha's Greece. Princeton University Press. p. 36. ISBN 978-0-6910-0194-4.
- Fleming, K. E. (2014). The Muslim Bonaparte: Diplomacy and Orientalism in Ali Pasha's Greece. Princeton University Press. ISBN 978-1-4008-6497-3.
- Elsie, Robert (2012). A Biographical Dictionary of Albanian History. I. B. Tauris. p. 27. ISBN 978-1-7807-6431-3.
- Howard, Douglas A. (2017). A History of the Ottoman Empire. Cambridge University Press. ISBN 978-1-1081-0747-1.
- Hoxha, Shpresa (2007). "Ali Pashë Tepelena dhe etnitë e pashallëkut të Janinës në vrojtimet e Likut" [Ali Pasha of Tepeleni and the Ethnic Groups in the Pashalik of Ioannina in Leake's Observations]. AKTET: 93–97. ISSN 2073-2244.
- Kallivretakis, Leonidas (1995). "Η ελληνική κοινότητα της Αλβανίας υπό το πρίσμα της ιστορικής γεωγραφίας και δημογραφίας [The Greek Community of Albania in terms of historical geography and demography]". In Nikolakopoulos, Ilias; Kouloubis Theodoros A.; Thanos M. Veremis (eds.). Ο Ελληνισμός της Αλβανίας [The Greeks of Albania]. University of Athens. ISBN 978-9-6008-0054-8.
- Malcolm, Noel (2020). Rebels, Believers, Survivors: Studies in the History of the Albanians. Oxford University Press. ISBN 978-0-1925-9922-3.
- Papageorgiou, Stefanos P. (2014). "The attitude of the Beys of the Albanian Southern Provinces (Toskaria) towards Ali Pasha Tepedelenli and the Sublime Porte (mid-18th-mid-19th centuries)". Cahiers balkaniques. 42. doi:10.4000/ceb.3520.
- Russell, Eugenia; Russell, Quentin (30 September 2017). Ali Pasha, Lion of Ioannina: The Remarkable Life of the Balkan Napoleon. Pen and Sword. p. 86. ISBN 978-1-4738-7722-1.
- Tanner, Marcus (2014). Albania's mountain queen: Edith Durham and the Balkans. London: I.B.Tauris. ISBN 978-1-7807-6819-9.
- Vakalopoulos, Apostolos E. (1973). Ιστορία του νέου ελληνισμού, Τόμος Δ': Τουρκοκρατία 1669–1812 – Η οικονομική άνοδος και ο φωτισμός του γένους (Έκδοση Β') [History of modern Hellenism, Volume IV: Turkish rule 1669–1812 – Economic upturn and enlightenment of the nation (2nd Edition)] (in Greek). Thessaloniki: Emm. Sfakianakis & Sons.
- Winnifrith, Tom (1992). "Albania and the Ottoman Empire". In Winnifrith, Tom (ed.). Perspectives on Albania. Warwick Studies in the European Humanities. Springer. pp. 74–88. ISBN 978-1-3492-2050-2.
