= Ioannina Eyalet =

Administrative division of the Ottoman Empire

Eyalet of Yanina
- Eyalet of Ottoman Empire
- 1670–1867
- Flag

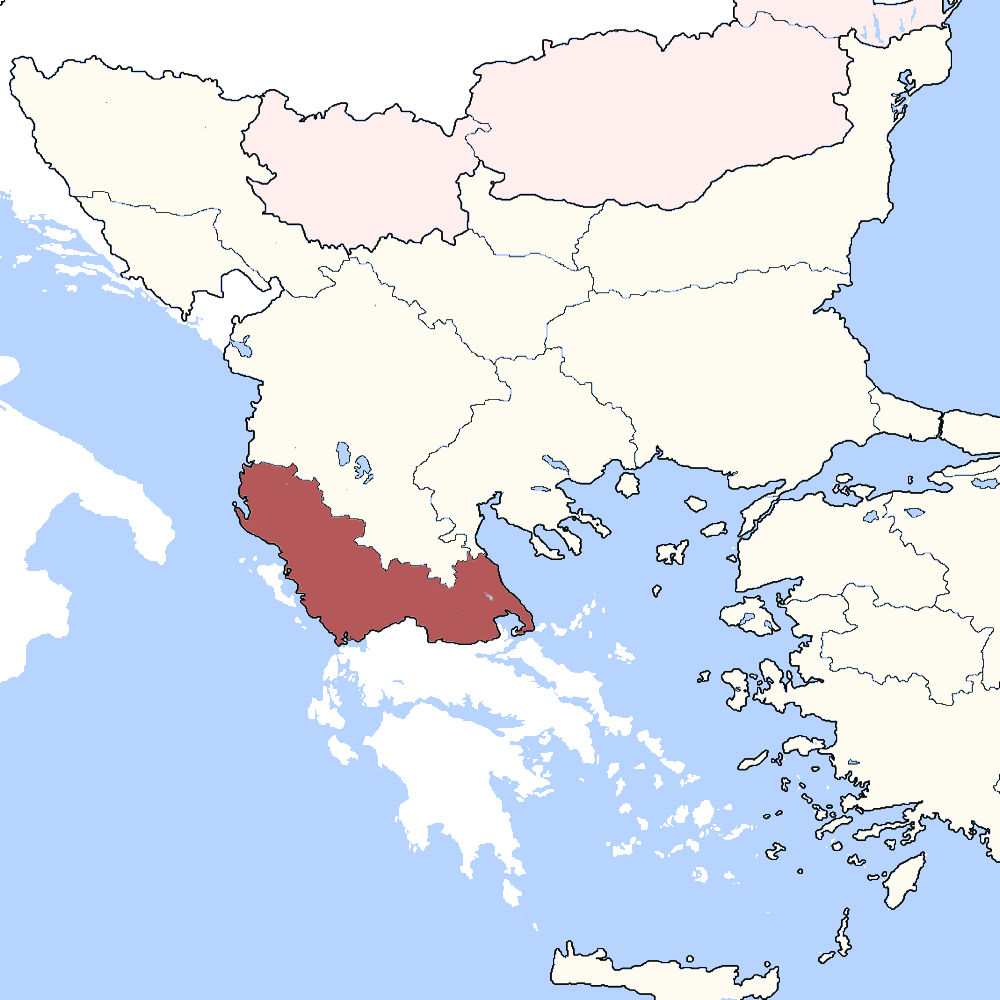
- The Yanina Eyalet in the 1850s
- Capital: Ioannina
- Area
  - Coordinates: 39°40′N 20°51′E
- History
  - Established: 1670
  - Disestablished: 1867
Preceded by	Succeeded by
Rumelia Eyalet	Pashalik of Yanina; Janina Vilayet
- Today part of: Greece; Albania

The Ioannina Eyalet (Ottoman Turkish: ایالت یانیه Eyālet-i Yānyâ) was an administrative territorial entity of the Ottoman Empire located in the territory of present-day southern Albania, central and northern Greece. It was formed in 1670 and its administrative centre was Ioannina. During the period 1788–1822, Ali Pasha (sanjakbey of Trikala) seized control over Ioannina and after enlisting most of the local brigands under his own banner took advantage of a weak Ottoman government to gain control over the Ioannina Eyalet and most of Albania and continental Greece, transforming it into the semi-autonomous Pashalik of Yanina. After he was killed in 1822 the Ottoman Empire reestablished the Ioannina Eyalet which existed until establishment of the Janina Vilayet in 1867.

== Administrative divisions ==
Sanjaks of the Eyalet in the mid-19th century:

1. Sanjak of Berat
2. Sanjak of Arghiri (Ergiri)
3. Sanjak of Ioannina
4. Sanjak of Narda (Arta)
