= Sanjak of Ioannina =

Sanjak of the Ottoman Empire

Coordinates: 39.66°N 20.85°E

- Sanjak of the Ottoman Empire
- 1430–1913
- Flag

- Sanjak of Ioannina, Ottoman Balkans (late 19th century)
- Capital: Ioannina
- Area
- History
  - Ottoman capture of Ioannina: 1430
  - Battle of Bizani: 1913
Preceded by	Succeeded by
Despotate of Epirus	Kingdom of Greece; Principality of Albania
- Today part of: Albania; Greece

The Sanjak of Ioannina (variously also Janina or Yanina, Ottoman Turkish: Sanjak-i Yanya) was a sanjak (second-level province) of the Ottoman Empire whose capital was Ioannina in Epirus.

== Administration ==
The Sanjak of Ioannina consisted of the following kazas: the central kaza of Ioannina, Aydonat (modern-day Paramythia in Greece), Filat (modern-day Filiates in Greece), Megva (modern-day Metsovo), Leshovik (modern-day Leskovik in Albania), Konice (modern-day Konitsa), Pogon (modern-day Pogon/Pogoni on the present Greek-Albanian border), and Permedi (modern-day Përmet in Albania).

Ottoman Greece with the Sanjak of Ioannina in the early 19th century

From 1430 to 1670 the sanjak of Janina was part of Rumelia Eyalet. From 1670 to 1787 the Sanjak of Ioannina was part of the Ioannina Eyalet. In 1788 Ali Pasha gained control of Ioannina and merged it with Sanjak of Trikala into the Pashalik of Yanina. Ali Pasha was killed in 1822. In 1834 Mahmood Hamdi pasha was appointed to govern the Sanjak of Delvina, Ioannina and Avlona. In 1867 the Sanjak of Ioannina was merged with Berat, Gjirokastër, Preveza and Kastoria into the Vilayet of Ioannina. Kesriye was later demoted to kaza and bounded to Monastir Vilayet.

During the reign of Bayazid II (1481–1512) the sanjakbey of Ioannina was Dâvud Pasha-zâde Mustafa Bey.

At the elections of 1908 the region elected two representatives for the Ottoman parliament, both of them Greeks: Dimitraki Kingos Efendi and Konstantin Surla Efendi.

The area was occupied by Greek troops during the First Balkan War, and was ceded to Greece in the London peace conference in 1913.

== Demography ==
From 1520 to 1538, according to the Ottoman census, the Sanjak of Ioannina was populated with 32,097 Christian families and 613 Muslim families.
