= Sanjak of Tirhala =

Ottoman province in Thessaly

Sanjak of Tirhala Ottoman Turkish: Liva-i Tirhala
- Sanjak of the Ottoman Empire
- 1395/6–1881
- Central Greece in the early 19th century, showing the sanjak of Tirhala ("Trikhala") in the centre
- Capital: Originally Trikala (Tirhala), from the 18th century Larissa (Yenişehir i-Fenari)
- History
  - Ottoman conquest: 1395/6
  - Cession to Greece: 1881
Preceded by	Succeeded by
Medieval Thessaly	Thessaly
- Today part of: Greece

The Sanjak of Tirhala or Trikala (Ottoman Turkish: Sancak-i/Liva-i Tirhala; Greek: λιβάς/σαντζάκι Τρικάλων) was second-level Ottoman province (sanjak or liva) encompassing the region of Thessaly. Its name derives from the Turkish version of the name of the town of Trikala. It was established after the conquest of Thessaly by the Ottomans led by Turahan Bey, a process which began at the end of the 14th century and ended in the mid-15th century.

== History ==
In the mid-14th century, Thessaly had been ruled by Serbian and Greek lords and enjoyed great prosperity. It was conquered by the Ottoman Turks in successive waves, in 1386/7, the mid-1390s, and again after 1414/23, and the conquest was not completed until 1470. Trikala itself fell probably in 1395/6 (although Evliya Çelebi claims it happened as early as 1390).

The newly conquered region was initially the patrimonial domain of the powerful marcher-lord (uç bey) Turahan Bey (died 1456) and of his son Ömer Bey (died 1484) rather than a regular province. Turahan and his heirs brought in settlers from Anatolia (the so-called "Konyalis", or "Koniarides" in Greek, since most were from the region around Konya) to repopulate the sparsely inhabited area, and soon, Muslim settlers or converts dominated the lowlands, while the Christians held the mountains around the Thessalian plain. Banditry was endemic, and led to the creation of the first state-sanctioned Christian autonomies known as armatoliks, the earliest and most notable of which was that of Agrafa.

Thessaly was generally peaceful, but did see the occasional conflict. Thus in 1570 the Venetians raided the region of Fenarbekir (Fanari), and failed Greek uprisings occurred in 1600/1 and 1612, the first under Dionysius the Philosopher, the metropolitan bishop of Yenişehir i-Fenari (Larissa), and the second at the instigation of the Duke of Nevers, who claimed the Byzantine throne. The local Greeks also rose up in various areas during the Morean War of 1684–1699, and again during the Orlov Revolt of 1770, but these insurrections were swiftly suppressed.

The 17th century saw the progressive weakening of the Ottoman central government, and the replacement of the timar system with the chiflik system in the lowlands, which were mainly concerned with agriculture (especially cotton production) and cattle-raising, while the mountain settlements experienced increased prosperity through their investment in crafts and commerce, and their organization into communal guilds. This prosperity was expressed in the growth of fairs and markets in the region's urban centres.

After 1780, the ambitious Ali Pasha of Ioannina took over control of Thessaly, and consolidated his rule after 1808, when he suppressed a local uprising. His heavy taxation, however, ruined the province's commerce, and coupled with the outbreak of the plague in 1813, reduced the population to some 200,000 by 1820. When the Greek War of Independence broke out in 1821, Greek risings occurred in the Pelion and Olympus mountains as well as the western mountains around Fenarbekir, but they were swiftly suppressed by the Ottoman armies under Mehmed Reshid Pasha and Mahmud Dramali Pasha.

After the establishment of the independent Kingdom of Greece, Greek nationalist agitation continued, with further revolts in 1841, 1854 and again during the Russo-Turkish War of 1877–1878. At the same time, despite the progressive reforms of the Tanzimat period, Thessaly experienced an increased concentration of the arable land by a few magnates, who reduced their tenant farmers to virtual serfdom.

Thessaly remained in Ottoman hands until 1881, when it was handed over to Greece under the terms of the Treaty of Berlin. The last Ottoman census, carried out in 1877/8, listed 250,000 inhabitants and 2,500 buildings for the sanjak, with a total population for Thessaly (including the region of Elassona, which remained Ottoman until the Balkan Wars) estimated at 285,000 Greeks, 40,000 Turks and 40,000 Jews.

== Administrative division ==
For most of its history, the sanjak formed part of the Rumeli Eyalet. In the tax census of 1454/5, the sanjak covered a much larger area than today’s Thessaly region, since it included areas of Pindos that today belong to the administrative regions of Epirus and the eastern portions of Central Greece. At the time it was part of the Rumeli Eyalet and divided into four sub-provinces: the Trikala (Τirhala) vilayet, the Larisa (Yenisehir) vilayet, the Fanari (Fenâr) vilayet and the Agrafa (Ağrafa) vilayet. The capital was the city of Trikala.

According to the 17th-century geographer Hajji Khalifa, the province encompassed nine kazas (districts): Tirhala itself, Palatmina (Platamonas), Yenişehir i-Fenari (Larissa), Golo (Volos), Çatalca (Farsala), Velestin (Velestino), Alasonya (Elassona), Döminek (Domeniko), and Fenarbekir. In the 18th century, the capital was transferred from Tirhala to Yenişehir, and the sanjak itself was often called accordingly.

After the Tanzimat reforms of the 1840s, Tirhala became part of the Salonica Eyalet (at the latest by 1846). Around 1854/55, it appears as a separate eyalet, but the source is unclear. In 1856 it became part of the Ioannina Eyalet, but in the 1863–1867 period, it certainly became an eyalet in its own right. Initially it probably encompassed only the old sanjak of Tirhala, but the 1864/65 salname (provincial year-book) adds the sanjaks of Golos (Volos), ceded from the Salonica Eyalet, Preveze (Preveza), a new province, and Avlonya (Vlora). However, in 1867, it was re-merged with the Ioannina Eyalet as a sanjak, which is listed in 1877 as having the following kazas: Yenişehir, Alasonya, Irmiye, Tirhala, Çatalca, Golos and Karadiğe (Karditsa).
