= Ibrahim Pasha of Berat =

Albanian noble

Ibrahim Pasha of Berat was the second and last ruler of the Pashalik of Berat, in office from 1787 to 1809.Ali Pasha of Yanina saw him as a threat which lead to an invasion by Ali Pasha, and the invasion resulted in a victory of Ali Pasha.

== Ruler ==
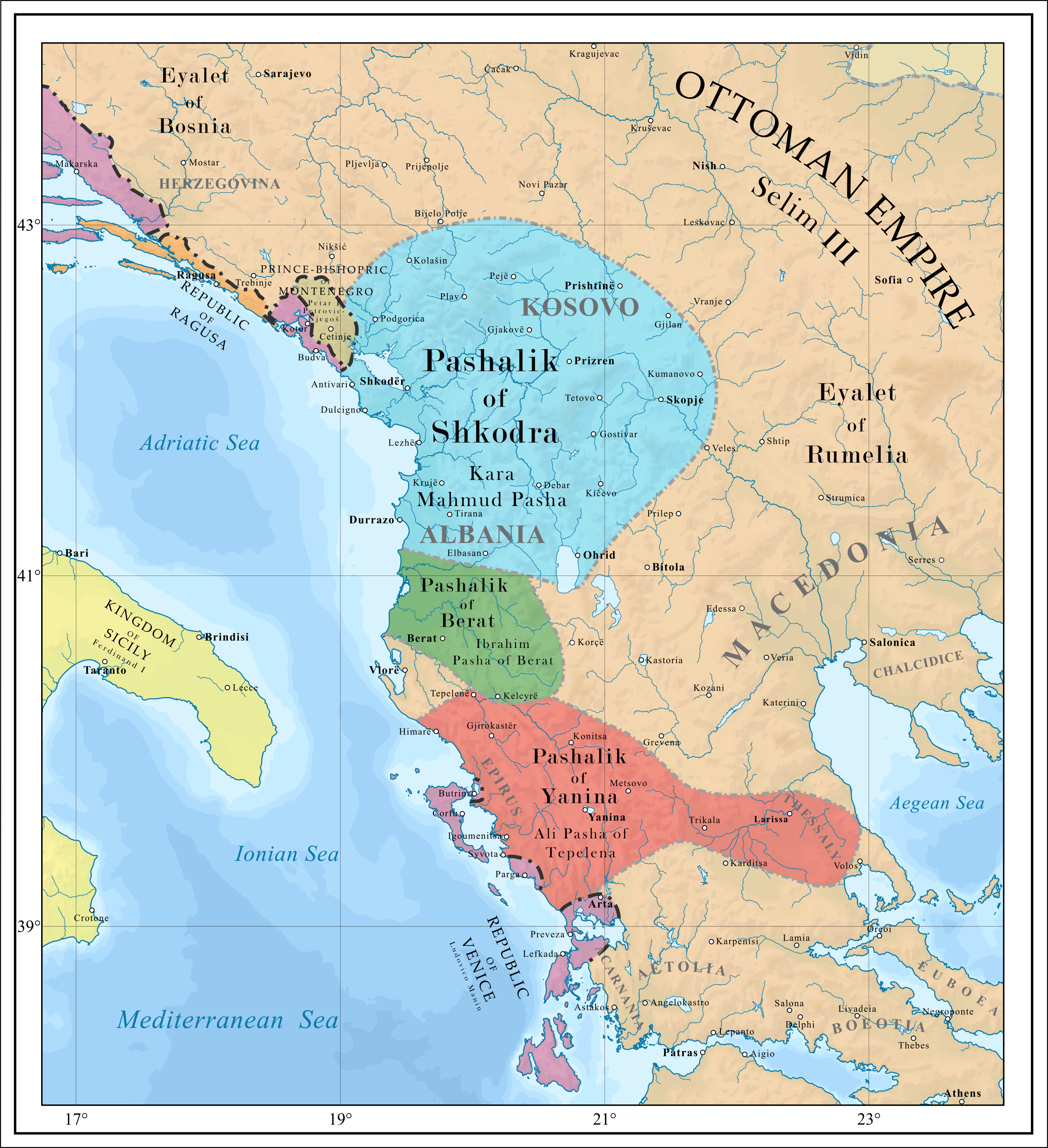
The Pashalik of Berat in 1790-1795 under the rule of Ibrahim Pasha.

Ibrahim Pasha of Avlona became ruler of the pashalik of Berat after the death of Ahmet Kurt Pasha with whom he had been a close ally. As this territory was part of Middle Albania, Ali Pasha of Ioannina saw him as a threat.

== Rivalry with Ali Pasha ==
After some fruitless negotiation, Ibrahim Pasha sent a body of troops under the command of his brother Sephir, bey of Avlona. Against these, Ali summoned the armatoles of Thessaly; and after villages had been burnt, peasants robbed and hanged, and flocks carried off on both sides, peace was made. Ibrahim gave his daughter in marriage to Mukhtar, the eldest son of Ali, and the disputed territory as her dower. As Sephir bey had displayed qualities which might prove formidable hereafter, Ali contrived to have him poisoned by a physician; and, after his usual fashion, he hanged the agent of the crime, that no witness might remain of it. In 1808, Ali Pasha defeated Ibrahim Pasha, incorporating its territory in the Pashalik of Janina.

Ibrahim Pasha's daughters were married to Ali's sons Veli and Muhtar, and Ali's nephew Mahmud Bey, in order to improve the relations between the pashaliks of Ali and Ibrahim.

== Economy ==
The local population and the tradesmen neither pay the kharatj nor any other tax, except a contribution of thirty paras a head per annum to Ibrahim Pasha of Berat, for the liberty of trading to his ports. The right of pasturage on the lands of the town of Khimara, that of gathering velanidhi on the mountains, and that of fishing in the northern bay of Palerimo are enjoyed in common by all the inhabitants. Maize is grown in the plain adjacent to the northern beach, where the two torrents, which embrace the town, overflow in the winter, and prepare the land for receiving that grain.

== See also ==
- Ahmet Kurt Pasha
- Pashalik of Berat

== Sources ==
- "History of Albanian People" Albanian Academy of Science. ISBN 99927-1-623-1
- Papageorgiou, Stefanos P. (2014). "The attitude of the Beys of the Albanian Southern Provinces (Toskaria) towards Ali Pasha Tepedelenli and the Sublime Porte (mid-18th-mid-19th centuries)". Cahiers balkaniques. 42. doi:10.4000/ceb.3520.

Preceded by Ahmet Kurt Pasha	Pasha of Berat; 1787–1809	Succeeded by Post abolished
