= Sanjak of Avlona =

Ottoman administrative unit between the 15th and 20th century

Sanjak of Avlona Sanxhaku i Vlorës
- Sanjak of Ottoman Empire
- 1466–1912
- Flag Coat of arms

- Sanjak of Avlona in the late 19th century
- Capital: Initially Avlonya, later Berat
- History
  - Construction of Elbasan Castle: 1466
  - First Balkan War: 1912
Preceded by	Succeeded by
League of Lezhë	Independent Albania
- Today part of: Albania

The Sanjak of Avlona (Turkish: Avlonya Sancağı, Albanian: Sanxhaku i Vlorës; sometimes referred to as the Sanjak of Berat because of its county town) was one of the sanjaks of the Ottoman Empire whose county town was Berat in Albania. It was established in 1466, after the construction of the Elbasan Castle of the territory that belonged to the preceding Ottoman sanjak, Sanjak of Albania.

== Geography ==
The territory of the Sanjak of Avlona extended between the Shkumbin river to the north and the Ceraunian Mountains to the south.

This sanjak had two kazas: kaza of Berat and kaza of Valona. Before the establishment of the Sanjak of Delvina in the middle of the 16th century, the following towns (kazas) also belonged to the Sanjak of Avlona: Delvina, Gjirokastër, Myzeqe and Labëria.

== Politics ==
Valona was conquered by the Ottomans in June 1417. In 1431, the Sanjak of Albania was created out of areas in present-day western Albania.

At the end of the 15th century, in order to stimulate trading, Ottomans settled small community of Sephardi Jews.

Gedik Ahmed Pasha was sanjakbey of the Sanjak of Avlona in 1479. Bali Bey, son of Yahya Pasha, became sanjakbey of the Sanjak of Avlona in 1506. Mehmed Beg Isaković, son of Isa-Beg Isaković, was appointed as sanjabey of Avlona in January 1516. Muzaffer Pasha was sanjakbey of Avlona before he was appointed for the first governor of Cyprus in 1570, after Cyprus was captured by the Ottoman Empire. Mustafa Pasha (Bin Abdullah), who had been on position of sanjakbey of Bosnia and Morea, was sanjakbey of Valona at the end of the 16th century and beginning of the 17th century. Avlonya was captured by Venetians in 1690, but it was recaptured by Ottomans in 1691. In 1691, centre of sanjak was relocated to Berat and the sanjak was gradually named as Sanjak of Berat. Sari Ahmed Pasha was appointed as sanjakbey of Avlona at the end of 1712 and in the 1714 he was transferred to position of beglerbeg of Rumelia. In the middle of the 18th century a sanjakbey of the Sanjak of Avlona was Ahmet Kurt Pasha from the Muzaka family who was later appointed to the position of derbendci aga (guardian of the mountain passes) which he held until the sultan appointed Ahmet's grandson, Ali Pasha Tepelena, instead of him.

In 1809, the sanjakbey of the Avlona was Ibrahim Pasha.

According to Eqrem Vlora members of his family were de facto (not de jure) sanjakbeys of Sanjak of Avlona in period 1481—1828. In 1834 Mahmood Hamdi pasha was appointed to govern the Sanjak of Delvina, Yanina and Avlona.

Ismail Kemal, the first prime minister of Albania, was elected a member of Ottoman parliament in December 1908 for the Sanjak of Berat.
