= Përparim =

Përparim is an Albanian masculine given name and may refer to:

== People ==
- Perparim Beqaj (born 1995), Swedish footballer
- Përparim Daiu (born 1970), Albanian footballer
- Përparim Dervishi (born 1955), Albanian civil servant
- Përparim Hetemaj (born 1986), Finnish footballer
- Përparim Kovaçi (born 1956), Albanian footballer and coach
- Përparim Rama (born 1976), Kosovan architect

== Places ==
- Përparim, Berat, a village in Albania
- Përparim, Elbasan, a village in Albania
