= Media Sustainability Index =

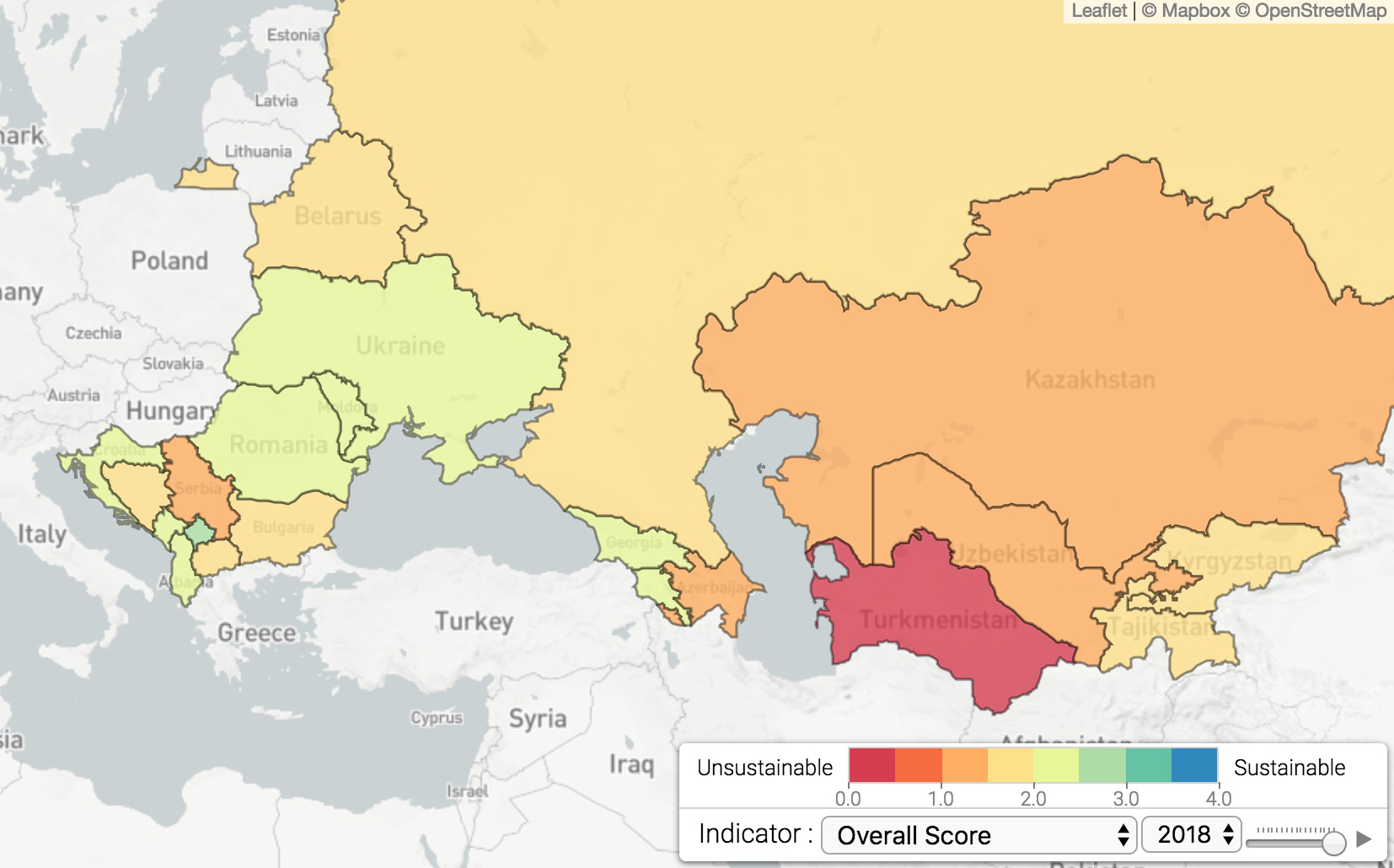
Overall scores on media sustainability in Europe and Eurasia from the Media Sustainability Index, 2018

The International Research and Exchanges Board's (IREX) Media Sustainability Index (MSI) is a tool to evaluate the global development of independent media. The MSI is one of the most important indices "to assess how media systems change over time and across borders", in addition to the Freedom of the Press Index compiled by Freedom House and the Press Freedom Index compiled by Reporters Without Borders.

In 2018, IREX launched a dynamic data platform, the Media Sustainability Explorer, that enables users to analyze and examine data from all years of the Europe and Eurasia MSI and to compare data trends across time, MSI objectives, regions and individual countries.

== Framework ==
The Media Sustainability Index (MSI) was elaborated by the International Research and Exchanges Board (IREX) in collaboration with the United States Agency for International Development (USAID) in 2001. Since then annual reports about “the development of media systems over time and across countries” have been published. The reports rate independent media sustainability in 80 countries across Africa, Asia, Europe and Eurasia and the Middle East and North Africa. The reports not only contain ratings, but also “an extensive Executive Summary of regional findings as well as individual country reports”. However, not all regions have been evaluated from the beginning. The Middle East and North Africa were added in 2005 and the Africa MSI was launched in 2007. The MSI does not gauge Western Europe or the United States. The surveys are funded by USAID, the US state department, UNESCO, Canadian International Development Agency (CIDA) and the People Technology Foundation. "Sustainability" within this concept "refers to the ability of media to play its vital role as the ‘fourth estate’". In other words, it relates to a media system that provides citizens with "useful, timely and objective information" and as well to a media system that can operate free and independent without political, legal, social or economic restrictions. Furthermore, it refers to a media system in which journalists have professional standards. And to a system where everybody has the right of free speech and access to information as the Article 19 of the Universal Declaration of Human Rights says. With the aid of the MSI an international comparison of the independence and/or sustainability of media systems is possible. An international comparison allows policymakers to parse media systems and examine the areas in which media development assistance can advance citizens’ access to news and information. Moreover, the results of the MSI provide essential information for the media, their representatives and outlets and inform them as well as the civil society and the governments of the strengths and weaknesses of each country.

== Methodology ==
=== Scoring system ===
The MSI uses five fundamental objectives to assess to what extent a media system is independent, sustainable and successful. The five objectives are:

1. "Legal and social norms protect and promote free speech and access to public information.
2. Journalism meets professional standards of quality.
3. Multiple news sources provide citizens with reliable, objective news.
4. Media are well-managed enterprises, allowing editorial independence.
5. Supporting institutions function in the professional interests of independent media".

These five objectives are the most central aspects of a sustainable and independent media system. Under each of these objectives are seven to nine indicators defining how well a country achieves that objective. Each indicator is scored from 0 to 4.

- A country scoring 0 does not fulfill the indicator and there might be forces holding back the implementation of the objective.
- Score 1 signifies the country slightly reaches the characteristics of the indicator. That means the government or other forces do not actively combat its implementation, but business environment do not foster it and also government or profession do not entirely support the progress.
- Score 2 implies that the country accomplishes many aspects of the indicator, but it is too early to evaluate the development. The country could still depend for example on present political forces.
- Score 3 connotes that the country reaches most features of the indicator. Implementation of the indicator has appeared over a number of years and/or during changes in government. The score refers to likely sustainability.
- Score 4 is the best score a panelist can give. It means the country fulfils all characteristics of the indicator. Implementation has endured intact over several changes in government and/or economy, shifts in public opinion and social conventions.

The scores for the indicators are then averaged to generate a single score for each objective. Next the five objectives’ scores are averaged to produce a final score for every country. In a following step the final score is interpreted as shown below:

- 0 - 1.00 = unsustainable, anti-free: Country does not reach or just slightly reaches objectives. Government and legislation actively holding back free media development. Country has little professionalism and low media-industry activity.
- 1.01 - 2.00 = unsustainable mixed system: Country marginally approaches objectives. Country has parts of a legal system, government is against a free media system, but there is obvious improvement in free-press advocacy and increasing professionalism. To evaluate sustainability one must continue to observe the development of new media businesses.
- 2.01 - 3.00 = near sustainability: Country approaches multiple objectives concerning legal norms, professionalism and a business environment supporting independent media. Improvements have survived shifts in government and have been established in law and practice. Nevertheless, the country needs more time to guarantee that change and to maintain the increased professionalism and the still young media business environment.
- 3.01 - 4.00 = sustainable: The media in the country is assumed to be professional, free and sustainable, or approaches these objectives almost. The systems fostering free media are still extant after several governments, after an unsteady economy and after changes in civic opinion or social conventions.

=== Scoring process ===
In each country IREX compiles a panel of local experts who undertake the scoring. The recruited experts represent a broad range of local media workers (editors, reports, owners, managers, media development workers) of urban and rural populations, of the main local ethnic groups in addition to representatives from different geographic regions as well as representatives from academia, NGO’s and the legal field. All panelists receive the objectives, the indicators with descriptions and an explanation of how the scoring is done correctly. First each panel member individually completes the questionnaire and scores the indicators. In a second step the panelists get together to talk about the objectives and indicators. This discussion is written up by a panel moderator, mostly a representative of the country's media or an NGO. Then it is revised by IREX editorial staff. Panelists are allowed to change their scores during the discussion, but it is not promoted by IREX. In a third step the "IREX editorial staff review the panelists’ scores, and then score the country independently of the MSI panel" .

== Comparing the MSI (IREX) to the Freedom of the Press Index (Freedom House) ==
The following two tables show a synopsis of the Media Sustainability Index (MSI) and the Freedom of the Press Index compiled by Freedom House. Table 1 compares the basic characteristics of the two indices, whereas table 2 is a more detailed analysis of the questionnaires.

=== Comparing the characteristics of the indices ===
First of all you can see in table 1 that there are some similarities between the indices. Both IREX and Freedom House have their headquarters in America, both are nonprofit organizations, which receive financial support from the American government or from agencies like USAID or NED, which are subsidized on their part by the government. Furthermore, both indices measures are designed to evaluate characteristics of media systems from the point of view of elite evaluators. Means the survey in a certain country is conducted by experts of the media environment of the country concerned. But the two indices do not assess the same number of countries. The MSI rates 80 countries, whereas the Freedom of the Press Index rates more than twice as much countries. Another difference is that Freedom House captures all 196 countries in one annual report, which allows a comparison of all 196 countries at the same time, whereas IREX assesses the 80 countries in five studies (Africa, Asia, Europe & Eurasia and Middle East & North Africa), that are not published simultaneously and some of them not even annually. For example, the last report of Middle East & North Africa one can download is from 2009. This means it is not possible to compare the development of the media environment in the surveyed countries at the same time within one year. Another point is that Freedom House has measured Freedom of the Press since 1980, more than twenty years longer than IREX measures Media Sustainability. So it becomes evident that Freedom House has more experience in conducting these studies. Furthermore, the two indices have different underlying concepts. The underlying concept of the Freedom of the Press Index is to evaluate the status of press freedom in an individual country. IREX’s concept however is to assess how successful, independent, sustainable a media system is in an individual country and “how media systems change over time and across borders”. To evaluate their respective target they use different questionnaires and scoring systems. The scoring systems as one can see in table 1 do not have much in common. IREX uses scores from 0 to 4, in which 0 is the worst score. Freedom House uses scores from 0 to 100, in which 0 is the best score. In advance Freedom House attaches different importance to the questions by giving some questions higher scores than others. So the panelists score the questions of the Freedom of the Press Index with a different number of points. The scoring system of the MSI is constantly the same. The surveyed persons score each indicator from 0 to 4. For this reason the MSI questionnaire seems to be clearer and more transparent and the questions can be better compared to each other.

Table 1
	Media Sustainability Index (IREX)	Freedom of the Press Index (Freedom House)
Countries	80	196
Panelists	Experts	Experts
First conducted in	2001	1980
Publication Frequency	partly annual	annual
Origin	America, Washington, D.C.	America, Washington, D.C.
Sponsors	USAID; U.S. state department UNESCO; Canadian International Development Agency (CIDA)	U.S. National Endowment for Democracy (NED); U.S. government European Commission
Concept	To assess how successful, independent, sustainable a media system is in an individual country	To assess the status of press freedom in an individual country
Categories	1. Legal and social norms protect and promote free speech and access to public information.; 2. Journalism meets professional standards of quality.; 3. Multiple news sources provide citizens with reliable, objective news.; 4. Media are well-managed enterprises, allowing editorial independence.; 5. Supporting institutions function in the professional interests of independent media.	1. Legal Environment (0-30 Points); 2. Political Environment (0-40 Points); 3. Economic Environment (0-30 Points)
Scoring System	0-4, 0 = worst; 4 = best: 0 - 1.00 = unsustainable, anti-free press; 1.01 - 2.00 = unsustainable mixed system; 2.01 - 3.00 = near sustainability; 3.01 - 4.00 = sustainable	0-100, 0 = best; 100 = worst: 0 - 30 = free; 31 - 60 = partly free; 61 - 100 = not free
Questions	5 questions with 7-9 indicators (40 in total). Panelists score each indicator from 0-4.	3 topics with 7-8 methodology questions (23 in total). Each methodology question has 3-8 sub-questions. Panelists score each methodology question, but not each sub-question. The sub-questions are meant to provide guidance for the meaning of the methodology question. Each methodology question is scored with a different number of points.

=== Comparing the questionnaires ===
At first glance the questionnaires appear to differ because of their different content and categories, their different structure and different number of questions, which you can see in table 1. But recent literature shows that there are similarities. For example, Becker and Vlad found out that although the indices pretend to measure different concepts (sustainable media vs. press freedom) they have a high average correlation (*Pearson r .87) across the years 2001 to 2007. This is so because press freedom is clearly a part of what the MSI assesses, because a media system cannot be sustainable without having a high level of press freedom. So press freedom is definitely one condition for a sustainable media system and therefore it becomes evident that the indices examine much the same phenomenon. It also explains why only about one-third of the questions could not be assigned in table 2 or why about two thirds of the questionnaires could be assigned. To find out what questions of the two indices really match and measure the same issues, the questionnaires need to be regarded in more detail. For that reason each single question of the two indices is compared to each other and assigned to new categories in table 2. Questions concerning the same subject but of two different indices are opposed to each other in two columns. If only one index measures a certain issue or category, the corresponding place in the second column remains empty, meaning this issue is not covered by the other index. As some questions contain different aspects, sometimes only one of the aspects fits to the associated question. To make this clear the non-fitting aspect is written in italics in table 2.

Table 2 is based on the questionnaires of the MSI and the Freedom of the Press Index
Categories	Media Sustainability Index (IREX)	Freedom of the Press Index (Freedom House)
Protection of free speech	1.1. Legal and social protections of free speech exist and are enforced. 1.5. The law protects the editorial independence of state or public media.	A.1. Do the constitution or other basic laws contain provisions designed to protect freedom of the press and of expression, and are they enforced? (0–6 points); A.2. Do the penal code, security laws, or any other laws restrict reporting and are journalists or bloggers punished under these laws? (0–6 points)
Free access to media	1.8. Media outlets' access to and use of local and international news and news sources is not restricted by law. 3.2. Citizens' access to domestic or international media is not restricted by law, economics, or other means.	B.2. Is access to official or unofficial sources generally controlled? (0–2 points)
Diversity of viewpoints	3.1. Plurality of public and private news sources (e.g., print, broadcast, Internet, mobile) exist and offer multiple viewpoints. 3.7. A broad spectrum of social interests are reflected and represented in the media, including minority-language information sources. 3.8. The media provide news coverage and information about local, national, and international issues. 2.8. Quality niche reporting and programming exists (investigative, economics/business, local, political).	B.5. Do people have access to media coverage and a range of news and information that is robust and reflects a diversity of viewpoints?(0–4 points)
Access to information	1.7. Public information is easily available; right of access to information is equally enforced for all media, journalists, and citizens.	A.5. Is Freedom of Information legislation in place and are journalists able to make use of it? (0-2 points)
Entry to media markets	1.3. Market entry and tax structure for media are fair and comparable to other industries.	A.6. Can individuals or business entities legally establish and operate private media outlets without undue interference? (0-4 points); C.5. Are there high costs associated with the establishment and operation of media outlets? (0–4 points)
Crimes against media workers	1.4. Crimes against media professionals, citizen reporters, and media outlets are prosecuted vigorously, but occurrences of such crimes are rare.	B.7. Are journalists, bloggers, or media outlets subject to extra’’legal intimidation’’ or physical violence by state authorities or any other actor? (0–10 points); B.6. Are both local and foreign journalists able to cover the news freely in terms of harassment and physical access? (0–6 points)
Penalties for libeling	1.6. Libel is a civil law issue; public officials are held to higher standards, and offended parties must prove falsity and malice.	A.3. Are there penalties for libeling officials or the state and are they enforced? (0–3 points)
Access to journalistic education	1.9. Entry into the journalism profession is free and government imposes no licensing, restrictions, or special rights for journalist.	A.8. Is there freedom to become a journalist and to practice journalism, and can professional groups freely support journalists’ rights and interests? (0–4 points)
Self-censorship	2.3. Journalists and editors do not practice self-censorship.	B.4. Do journalists practice self-censorship? (0–4 points)
Corruption	2.5. Pay levels for journalists and other media professionals are sufficiently high to discourage corruption and retain qualified personnel within the media profession.	C.7. Do journalists, bloggers, or media outlets receive payment from private or public sources whose design is to influence their journalistic content? (0–3 points)
Transparence of media ownership and of media concentration	3.6. Transparency of media ownership allows consumers to judge the objectivity of news; media ownership is not concentrated in a few conglomerates. 1.2. Licensing or registration of broadcast media protects a public interest and is fair, competitive, and apolitical.	C.1. To what extent are media owned or controlled by the government and does this influence their diversity of views? (0–6 points); C.2. Is media ownership transparent, thus allowing consumers to judge the impartiality of the news? (0–3 points); C.3. Is media ownership highly concentrated, and does it influence diversity of content? (0–3 points)
Subvention system	4.5. Government subsidies and advertising are distributed fairly, governed by law, and neither subvert editorial independence nor distort the market.	C.6. Do the state or other actors try to control the media through allocation of advertising or subsidies? (0–3 points)
External media bodies and evaluations	4.6.Market research is used to formulate strategic plans, enhance advertising revenue, and tailor the product to the needs and interests of the audience. 4.7. Broadcast ratings, circulation figures, and Internet statistics are reliably and independently produced.	A.7. Are media regulatory bodies, such as a broadcasting authority or national press or communications council, able to operate freely and independently? (0–2 points)
Distribution and production restrictions	5.6. Sources of media equipment, newsprint, and printing facilities are apolitical, not monopolized, and not restricted.: 5. 7. Channels of media distribution (kiosks, transmitters, cable, Internet, mobile) are apolitical, not monopolized, and not restricted.	C.4. Are there restrictions on the means of news production and distribution? (0–4 points)
Political parallelism	3.3. State of public media reflects the views of the political spectrum, are nonpartisan, and serve the public interest.	B.1. To what extent are media outlets’ news and information content determined by the government or a particular partisan interest? (0–10 points)
Independent judiciary		A.4. Is the judiciary independent and do courts judge cases concerning the media impartially? (0–3 points)
Censorship		B.3. Is there official or unofficial censorship? (0–4 points)
Overall economic stability		C.8. Does the overall economic situation negatively impact media outlets’ financial sustainability? (0–4 points)
Professional standards	2.1. Reporting is fair, objective, and well sourced. 2.2. Journalists follow recognized and accepted ethical standards. 2.4. Journalists cover key events and issues.	
Quality management	5.2. Professional associations work to protect journalists' rights and promote quality journalism. 5.4. Quality journalism degree programs exist providing substantial practical experience. 5.5. Short-term training and in-service training institutions and programs allow journalists to upgrade skills or acquire new skills.	
Entertainment vs. news programming	2.6. Entertainment programming does not eclipse news and information programming	
Modern Technique & infrastructure	2.7. Technical facilities and equipment for gathering, producing, and distributing news are modern and efficient. 5.8. Information and communication technology infrastructure sufficiently meets the needs of media and citizens.	
News agencies	3.4. Independent news agencies gather and distribute news for media outlets.	
Media revenues	4.2. Media receive revenue from a multitude of sources.	
Advertising	4.3. Advertising agencies and related industries support an advertising market. 4.4. Advertising revenue as a percentage of total revenue is in line with accepted standards.	
Existence of private media	3.5. Private media produce their own news.	
Trade associations	5.1. Trade associations represent the interests of media owners and managers and provide member services.	
NGOs promoting media freedom	5.3. NGOs support free speech and independent media.	
Independent media outlets	4.1.Media outlets operate as efficient and self-sustaining enterprises.	

The MSI as well as the Freedom of the Press Index contain questions concerning the following categories:

- Protection of free speech

The questions are about legal protection for free speech. But there are slight differences between the questions. For example, the MSI includes social protection and a distinction between state and public media. The Freedom of the Press Index contains in addition or penalties of journalists and also the distinction between freedom of expression and freedom of the press. However, they both measure protection of free speech.

- Free access to media

In this category the questions are all about free access to media and its protection. Here the MSI specifies the protection against economic threats and law restrictions. Whereas the Freedom of the Press Index just asks about it in general. The MSI also makes a distinction between local and international sources and only the Freedom of the Press Index differentiates between official and unofficial sources.

- Diversity of viewpoints

The MSI has more than one question regarding this category because it specifies the viewpoints. Private and public news sources, niche reporting and programming, local, national and international information as well as social interests and minority languages should be reflected. This differentiation cannot be found in the Freedom of the Press Index. So Freedom House includes the access to plurality viewpoints, which is no subject within the MSI.

- Access to information

Here the MSI differentiates between access to information for media, journalists and citizens, whereas the Index of Freedom House focuses more on existing laws protecting the access to information for journalists.

- Entry to media markets

MSI compares the entry to the media market to entries to other industries. The Freedom of the Press Index operates in this category on a more specific and operational level. It includes both individuals and business entities, which can establish and operate media. And it also deals with the legal regulations for establishing media.

- Crimes against media workers

The Freedom of the Press Index distinguishes between crimes committed by the state, authorities and other actors and the type of crimes such as legal intimidation, physical violence. It examines if local and foreign journalists can work freely without harassments. The MSI deals with legal prosecution of the crime but does not specify the type of crime nor who commits the crime. Both indices, however, differentiate against whom crimes are committed.

- Penalties for libeling

The question about libeling asked by the Freedom of the Press Index concerns existing penalties for libeling officials or the state. The MSI relates more to the person who is defamed and what they can do to prevent libeling (e.g. public officials are held to higher standards, must prove falsity). Furthermore, the MSI question contains the aspect of the civil law against libeling.

- Access to journalistic education

Both indices ask if everyone has the freedom to become a professional journalist. But MSI also raises the question if there are restrictions against or special laws in favour of freedom. The Freedom of the Press Index instead contains the question if professional groups have the freedom to support journalists. This is just one example for the fact that the MSI as well as the Freedom of the Press Index sometimes ask two questions in one, which makes it difficult for the panelists to score.

- Self-censorship

In this category the questions are relatively similar except that the MSI also queries the self-censorship of the editors. Another little difference is the fact that the MSI indicator is formulated negatively.

- Corruption

Only the Freedom of the Press Index differentiates between private and public payments. Overall the question about corruption is put more directly in the Freedom of the Press Index than in the MSI. The MSI asks in one question if the payment of journalists is high enough and if the quality standard of the journalists is good enough to prevent corruption. Put that way, the question concerning corruption seems less direct and aggressive in the MSI index.

- Transparency of media ownership and of media concentration

Both indices ask if media ownership and concentration allows transparency so that consumers are able to judge the content and have access to different points of view. In the Freedom of the Press Index the question to what extent the government controls the media and what impact control has on the diversity of views is put in a way that public broadcasting is subliminally criticized. IREX, however, words the question in a more positive way. The way of putting a question, the choice of words may have an influence on the valuation.

- Subvention system

Again the question of the Freedom of the Press Index is asked more directly than the MSI one. It focuses on the control-aspect someone (state or other actors) can have through subsidies or advertising. By contrast the MSI indicator deals more with a fair and law-based distribution of subsidies and advertising that promotes editorial independence. But the MSI question does not refer to subsidies and advertising from other actors than the government.

- External media bodies and evaluations

Here all questions are put positively. But they contain different external media bodies. Whereas the MSI indicators include independent broadcasting ratings and market researches and its duties, the question of the Freedom of the Press Index includes independent media regulatory bodies like the communications council.

- Distribution and production restrictions

The MSI questions in this category are more detailed. They divide production and distribution in their different branches like media equipment, newsprint, and printing facilities, kiosks, transmitters, cable, Internet, mobile. And again the questions are devised positively with words like apolitical or not restricted. In contrast the Freedom of the Press Index does not divide production and distribution in different branches and here again the question is asked in a direct way in order to get an exact answer to what it wants to measure: the restrictions.

- Political parallelism

These questions examine to what extent the state, politicians or others affect or influence the media content and diversity. Again the MSI question is put in a more positive way due to the use of positive adjectives, whereas the Freedom of the Press Index uses negatively connoted verbs like determine.

Generally speaking, the Freedom of the Press Index operates with more direct questions and on a more restrictive level. The questions mostly refer to possible media restrictions, influences or control by someone or something. As already indicated by its name, this way of asking questions shows the Freedom of the Press Index's main concern and underlying concept - that is the freedom of the press. This concept of the freedom of the press must be seen together with "the legal environment for the media, political pressures that influence reporting, and economic factors that affect access to information". So the Freedom of the Press Index also includes for example questions about independent judiciary, censorship and the impact of the overall economic stability on the media, subjects that are not covered by the MSI. The MSI, however, operates on a wider field. That means it also focuses on professional standards, quality journalism, trainees for journalists, modern technical facilities for distributing and infrastructure, NGOs supporting free media, and the existence of private media as one can see in table 2. But one should keep in mind that both indices have an American bias underlying their measures and concepts. Therefore, the indices may not fit perfectly in order to access media freedom in countries with a different cultural background.

== See also ==
- Freedom of the press
- Freedom House
- Reporters without Borders
- Press Freedom Index
- European Charter on Freedom of the Press
- European Centre for Press and Media Freedom
