= Albanian name =

Albanian names are names that are used by Albanians in Albania, Kosovo, North Macedonia, Montenegro, Serbia, or the diaspora. In Albania, a full name usually consists of a given name (Albanian: emri); the given name of the individual's father (patronymic, Albanian: atësia), which is seldom included except in official documents; and a (most commonly patrilineal) family name or surname (Albanian: mbiemri). They are invariably given in the Western name order, with the given name being followed by the family name.

Albanian given names are traditionally originally-Albanian names or religious names (Islamic or Christian).

== Given names ==
While in Kosovo, Montenegro and North Macedonia, Albanian ("Illyrian") and religious names are quite common, in Albania proper, Albanian or Muslim names are rarely given. That is the result of the high net emigration rate of Albania and the desire of most Albanian emigrants to assimilate internationally. Another factor is the secularisation that took place during the communist rule, which discouraged explicitly Christian or Muslim given names. In 2014, among the 20 most commonly used given names for newborn children in Albania was not a single Albanian name. Instead, "international" (Christian or English) names were most popular.

Traditionally, most given names in Albania did not have Albanian origins because they were religious names, either Christian or Islamic. During Communist Albania, an Illyrian origin of the Albanians (without denying "Pelasgian roots", a theory that has been revitalized today) continued to play a significant role in Albanian nationalism, resulting in a revival of given names supposedly of Illyrian origin, at the expense of given names associated with Christianity or Islam. The trend originated with the 19th century Rilindja, but became more common after 1944, when it became the government's policy to heavily discourage religious given names. Ideologically-acceptable names were listed in the Fjalor me emra njerëzish (1982). They could be native Albanian words like Flutur ("butterfly"), ideologically communist ones like Marenglen (Marx-Engels-Lenin), or "Illyrian" ones compiled from epigraphy: from the necropolis at Dyrrhachion excavated in 1958 to 1960.

== Surnames ==
Many surnames in Albania have Islamic and Christian roots.

Common last name endings include -aj, as well as common definite Albanian nominative singular endings: hence -i for originally masculine last names except for those previously ending in k, g, h or i, which add -u; that is replaced by -a/-ja for feminine names. The last name ending of -aj is patronymic as the -aj means "son of" the name put in before the suffix; e.g. Lucaj (son of Luca), Gjeloshaj (son of Gjelosh), Hasanaj (son of Hasan).

Many last names were originally surnames, many of them being either Muslim (Ahmeti, Rexhepi, etc.), Bektashi (Bektashi itself as a surname, Dervishi, Shehu, etc.) or Christian (Kristo(ja), Evangjeli, etc.), but a large number are neither simply come from old Albanian secular names (Zogolli, Dushku, Shkoza etc.). Albanians frequently have surnames that do not match their actual religious identity, often because of recent secularization, religious intermarriage, relatively recent conversion in late Ottoman times (many Muslims have Christian names for that reason, and after the fall of communism, some Albanians with Muslim ancestry have become practicing Christians and vice versa) or the practice of Ottoman Christians taking Muslim names because of Muslim dominance of society during those times. Names starting with Papa- usually indicate Christian origin, but there are cases of them being followed by a Muslim element (i.e. Papazisi, a name held by Albanians of both Christian and Muslim heritage).

Another major source of Albanian last names are place names. Albanians sometimes took their hometowns as surnames, and especially when a family moved to another place, they often took their former residence as a surname, leading to somewhat well known last names such as Frashëri, Përmeti, Shkodra, Kelmendi, Shkreli, Delvina, Prishtina, etc.). In Northern Albania and in Kosovo, clan names are also very prominent, most notably the names of widespread clans such as Krasniqi, Berisha and Gashi. The surnames Gega, Gegprifti, Gegaj etc. probably indicate Northern (Gheg) origins, as Toska and Toskaj do for Southerners. In addition, many names, even if not explicitly, are strongly identified with certain regions and Albanians can often tell another Albanian's regional origin from their last name. Surnames based on occupation are less common than in other countries but nevertheless the surnames Hoxha (mullah, either Bektashi or Sunni) and Prifti (priest, used by both Catholics and Orthodox) remain very common.

Arvanite and pre-modern Albanian surnames are also common. Many Arvanite surnames are found in Albania, in the modern Albanian form. For example, the word in Arvanitika (Arbërisht) for "brave" or "pallikari" (in Greek) being "çanavar" (Turkish canavar meaning "monster") or its shortened form "çavar" was pronounced "tzanavar" or "tzavar" giving birth to Arvanitic family names like "Tzanavaras" and/or "Tzavaras". This is a link between Albanian and Greek names. The Arvanite surname "Κριεζής" (Kriezis) is a very common Albanian surname. "Kryezi" means "Blackhead" in Albanian (hence same meaning in Arbërisht/Arvanitika).

Orthodox Christian names tend to be heavily Greek, including last names which have counterparts in the Greek language.

== History ==
=== Communist-era Albania ===
According to a decree issued in 1966, Muslims in Albania had to change their names to Albanian names, and newborn Albanians had to receive non-religious names. In a decree of November 1975, all the citizens of Albania whose names were considered objectionable by the Albanian Communist Party were ordered to change their names to "pure Albanian names" by the end of the year.

=== Diaspora ===
Albanians form the largest migrant group in Greece and the second-largest migrant group in Italy. Many modern names are thus Greek or Italian. In Greece and likewise in Italy, many Albanian newcomers change their Albanian names to Greek or Italian ones and their religion, if Islam, to Christianity.
