= Peqin Clock Tower =

- Kulla e Sahatit të Peqinit
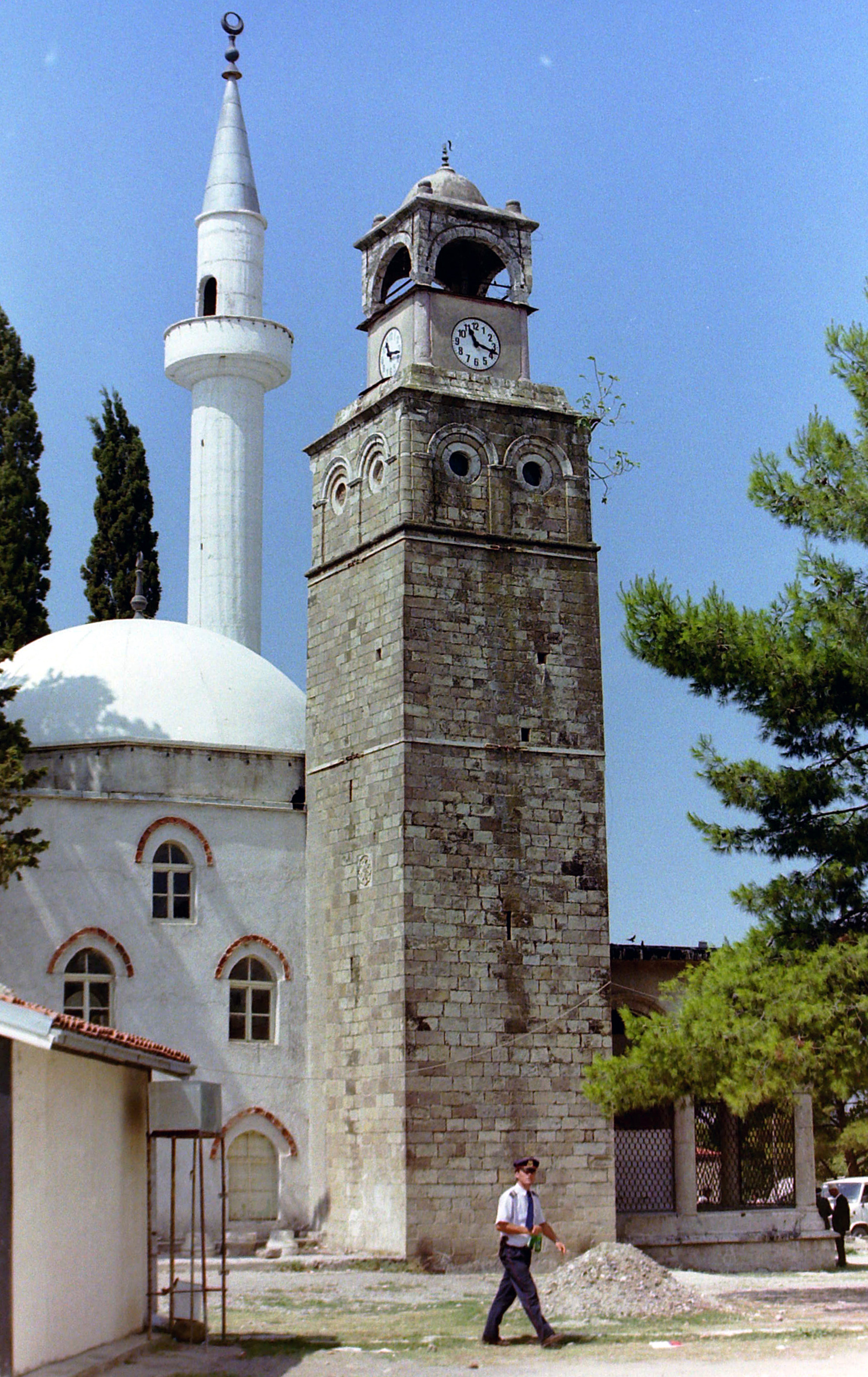
- Clock Tower of Peqin in 1995
- 41.04592°N 19.75060°E
- Type: Clock tower
- Location: Peqin, Albania

History
- Founder: Mir Ismaili
- Built: 1823–1841

Site notes
- Height: 20.6 m (68 ft)
- Architectural style: Ottoman style
- Restored: 1987
- Owner: Municipality of Peqin

Cultural Monument of Albania
- Type: Cultural
- Criteria: Cat. I
- Designated: 15 January 1963; 10 June 1973

The Clock Tower of Peqin (Albanian: Kulla e Sahatit të Peqinit) is a monument of cultural heritage from the Ottoman era located in Peqin, Albania. It was first recognized as a cultural heritage site by the rectorate of the State University of Tirana in 1963. This status was later upheld by the Ministry of Education and Culture in 1973.

== History ==
In 1670, the Ottoman explorer Evliya Çelebi who visited Peqin, observed a town made up of 400 dwellings, seven quarters, four mosques, two tekkes, seven masjids, three madrassas and seven mekteps. Later, in the 1840s, Albanologist Georg von Hahn documented the center of Peqin, describing its bazaar, which was “distinguished by an elegant mosque and a clock tower.” By the late 19th century, renowned Albanian scholar Sami Frashëri, in his Kâmûs al-A’lâm (Vol. 3), identified the clock tower as a notable landmark in the town's center.

The mosque attached to the clock tower was reconstructed by order of Xhafer Sadik Pasha, son of Sulejman Pasha and successor of Abdurrahman Pasha. According to Franz Babinger, the mosque was rebuilt in 1256 Hijri (1840–1841) after being destroyed by fire. However, it is possible that its construction was completed earlier, as Sadik Pasha died in 1250 H (1834). The date given by Babinger may in fact refer to the completion of both the mosque and the clock tower.

The inscription on the entrance gate of the mosque reveals that it was built by Mir Ismaili, a local beylerbey, in the year 1238 H (1822–1823 CE). It reads:

“A mosque that resembles heaven, a place of refuge for Muslims. God is full of grace toward his servants: Abdurrazak, year 1238.”

The chronogram, engraved in delicate taʿlīq script on two marble plaques (0.40 x 0.60 m), is positioned above the mosque’s second gate. The verses, arranged in seven distichs (AA, BA, CA…), cover the two plaques, with Quranic verses inscribed in smaller script at the bottom of the first plaque and the author’s name and construction date on the second.

The mosque was subsequently demolished in 1967, during Albania’s anti-religious ideological revolution.

== Architecture ==
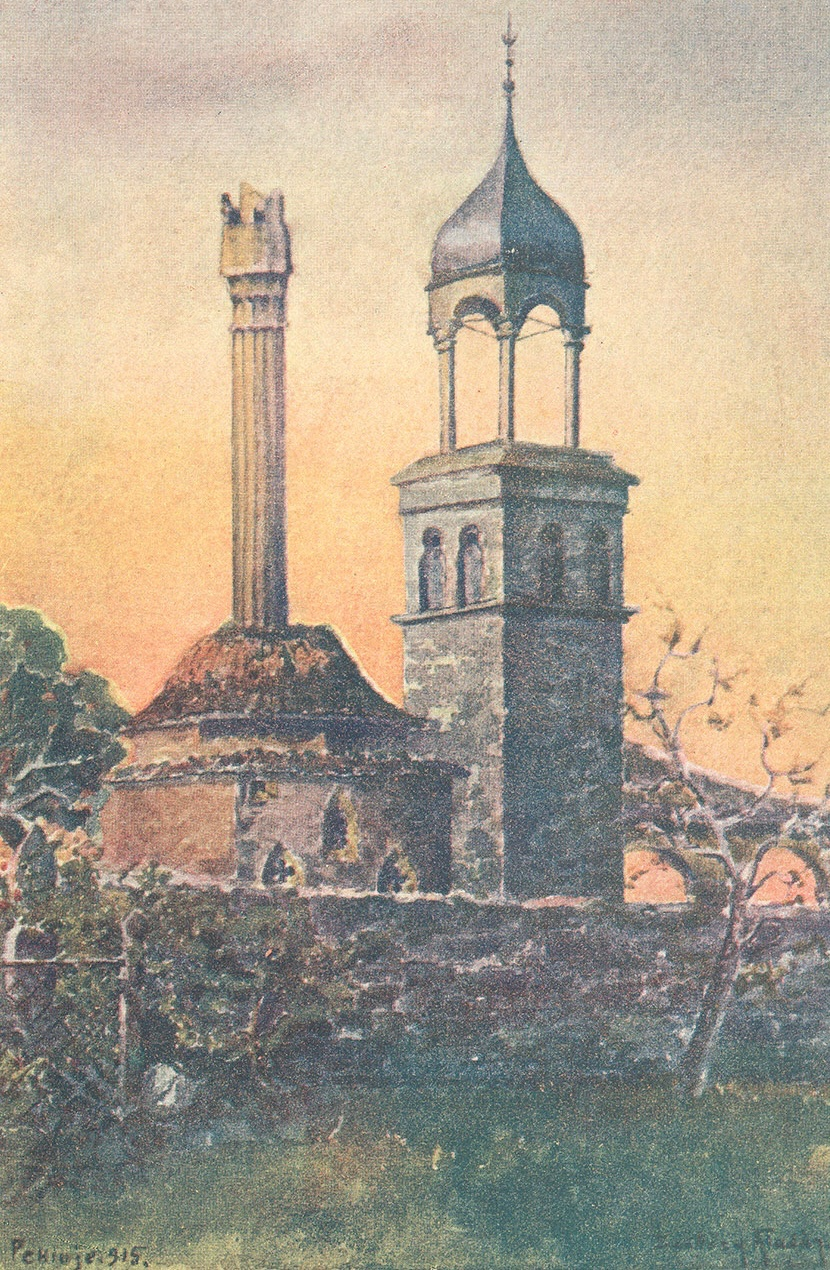
Painting of the clock tower and the mosque minaret by Aladár Szöllősy (December 5, 1915)

The clock tower of Peqin is a type III clock tower, characterized by three floors and represents the second variant of this type. (Note: A type III clock tower consists of three floors. The first floor is similar to that of the two-story design: tall, enclosed by thick stone walls and housing the movement of the weight stones. With the introduction of a more complex clock mechanism, an additional floor was incorporated between the first and second floors, specifically to accommodate the mechanism. This category includes two variations: in the first, the second floor is open, while in the second, that same floor is enclosed, serving as the space designated for the clock mechanism.) Its floor plan measures 3.86 x 4.12 meters, with a total height reaching 20.6 meters. The stone walls are 0.83 meters thick. Similar to the clock tower in Tirana, its exterior masonry was constructed using hewn stones arranged in rows with thin mortar joints.

On the southeastern exterior, a carved white limestone relief featuring plant motifs can be found. The tower’s entrance is through an arched gate positioned on the northwest side, located between the base of the stairs. The first floor, designed to hold the weights of the clock mechanism, still retains its original wooden staircase, which includes a landing tread for every five steps.

The second floor begins with a platform housing the clock mechanism. Like the first floor, it is enclosed and features symmetrical double blind arches, topped by a dome supported by lateral trumpet arches. This dome has two openings: one original and the other a later addition, leading to the third floor, which contains the bell chamber.

The bell chamber is supported by four monolithic stone columns with carved capitals, arches and a domed ceiling. The spaces between the columns were enclosed with walls, creating openings for clock faces and adding a passageway, to access the clock hands for adjustment.

=== Clock mechanism ===
The clock mechanism, thought to have been manufactured in Switzerland, is composed of two main sections: the left side, which controls the bell and the right side, which operates the clock itself. The system relies on weight stones connected by a cable. As the weights descend, they drive the mechanism, with the pendulum regulating the clock’s movement.

The upper axis of the mechanism has 30 teeth and employs a system that generates two interactions per tooth, resulting in one-second intervals (30 x 2 = 60 seconds). This movement is transferred via an axis to the distribution box, which houses six conical gears. Four of these gears control the motion of the clock hands on the tower’s four faces, while two stabilize the central mechanism.

From the distribution box, the movement is transmitted to all four clock faces. Each face includes a counterweight that balances the minute hand, compensating for its length and weight to ensure consistent and precise operation.

=== The bell ===
The bell chimes at every full hour and half-hour, operated by a lever connected to the clock mechanism. Its ringing is driven by a system of weight stones that power the hammer’s movement. At the hour mark, the hammer strikes the bell the same number of times as the hour, while at the half-hour, it strikes once.

The original bell of the clock tower was reportedly stolen by a local resident and sold in Berat, prized for its powerful, resonant sound, which made it both unique and highly coveted. The current bell, installed as a replacement, remains in use today. It features two religious images and is inscribed with the year 1526 (MDXXVI).

=== Restorative interventions ===
A restorative intervention was carried out in 1987, led by specialists from the Institute of Cultural Monuments. The project focused primarily on reinforcing the structure by installing two iron rings with tensioning mechanisms to stabilize the walls, which had been weakened by seismic activity. In addition, the wooden stairs were repaired, with maintenance work performed on the clock mechanism and its surrounding area.
