= Xhaçka =

Xhaçka is an Albanian surname. Notable people with the surname include:

- Niko Xhaçka (born 1944), Albanian footballer
- Olta Xhaçka (born 1979), Albanian politician

== See also ==
- Xhaka
