= Dervishi (surname) =

Dervishi is a modern Albanian surname of Persian origin from "darvish (درویش, Darvīsh or "Darwish" in Arabic), that entered Albanian from the Turkish adaption "Derviş" (Dervish). Notable people with the surname include:

- Erald Dervishi (born 1979), Albanian chess grandmaster
- Lutfi Dervishi (born 1967), Albanian journalist, academic, television presenter and political commentator
- Përparim Dervishi (born 1955), Albanian civil servant
- Qazim Dervishi (1908–1994), Albanian soccer player and international referee
- Roland Dervishi (born 1982), Albanian football striker
- Teki Dervishi (1943–2011), ethnic-Albanian poet, novelist and playwright
