= Xhaka =

Xhaka is an Albanian surname. Notable people with the surname include:

- Fatime Xhaka (1952–1999), Kosovan sports leader and activist
- Granit Xhaka (born 1992), Swiss footballer
- Rexhep Xhaka (born 1945), Kosovan former footballer and coach
- Taulant Xhaka (born 1991), Swiss-Albanian footballer, brother of Granit
