= 1911 Fier Fair Tournament =

Football tournament in Albania

1911 Fier Fair Tournament was the first ever Football tournament in Albania. The tournament is still not recognised by FSHF.

== Quarter Finals ==
Played from 7–10 April 1911.

Team 1	Score	Team 2
Tirana	9 - 4	Elbasani
Kavaja	8 - 2	Berati
Peqini	11 - 3	Vlora
Fieri	6 - 2	Lushnja

== Semi Finals ==
Played from 11 to 12 April 1911.

Team 1	Score	Team 2
Tirana	4 - 0	Kavaja
Fieri	2 - 16	Peqini

== Final ==
Played on 14 April 1911.

Team 1	Score	Team 2
Tirana	6 - 1	Peqini

Tirana won the tournament.
