= Abdi Pasha the Albanian =

Ottoman politician and military leader of Albanian descent

Abdurrahman Abdi Pasha the Albanian
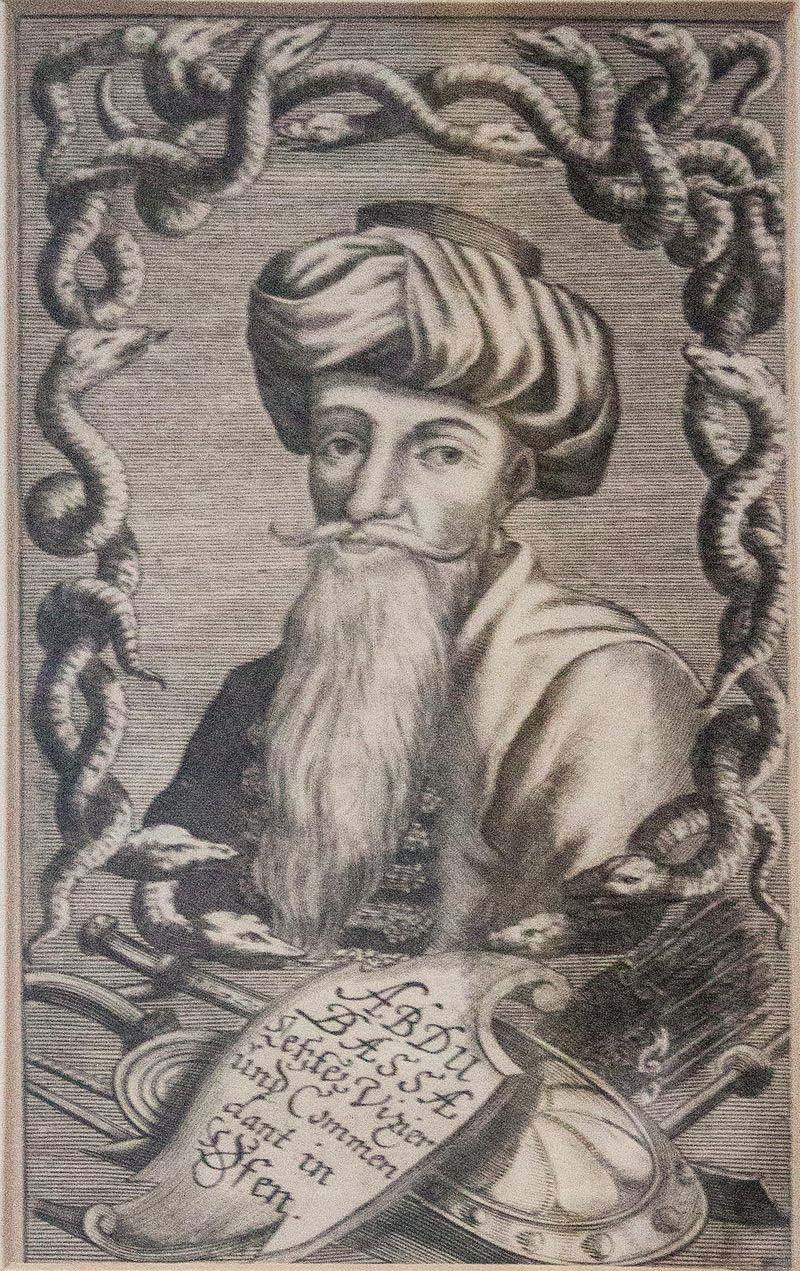
- Born: 1616; Çopani, Peqin, Ottoman Empire (modern Albania)
- Died: 1686 (aged 69–70); Buda, Ottoman Hungary (modern Hungary)
- Wars and battles: Siege of Candia; Siege of Kamenets; Siege of Buda (1686) †
- Occupation: Politician and Military leader

Abdurrahman Abdi Pasha the Albanian (Turkish: Arnavut Abdurrahman Abdi Paşa; 1616–1686) was an Ottoman politician and military leader of Albanian descent, who served as the last governor of the province of Budin.

== Early life ==
Abdurrahman Abdi Arnavud Pasha was born in the village of Çopani near Peqin, Albania. He joined the Ottoman army and became Agha of the Janissaries in 1667. He gained experience during the siege of Candia, which the Venetians had to surrender in 1669. In 1672, he led the janissaries in the conquest of Kamieniec. In 1673, he became the governor of Baghdad. He was made governor of Egypt in 1676 and of Bosnia in 1680.

== Military leadership ==
He took over the military leadership of Buda in 1682 and became the governor of Ottoman-occupied Hungary in 1684. In 1684, the Holy League was established with the objective of ending the Ottoman threat to Europe by ousting the Ottomans from Hungary, which they had been ruling for 145 years. On the initiative and financial support of Pope Innocent XI, the Holy Roman Emperor, the King of Poland and the Republic of Venice sent 80,000 troops into Buda, and Hungary. The army was composed of Saxon, Bavarian, Brandenburg and Swedish troops, with lesser numbers of Italy, England, France and Spain, and some 15,000 Hungarians. The armies were led by Prince Charles of Lorraine, Bavarian Elector Maximilian II Emanuel, Margrave of Baden Louis William and Prince Eugene of Savoy, all eminent military leaders of the time.

In June, 1686, the Christian army laid siege to Buda. The city was well stocked with food, water and gunpowder, but only 8000 soldiers were garrisoned within; although the Ottomans had promised 50,000 troops, they had not yet arrived.

== Death ==
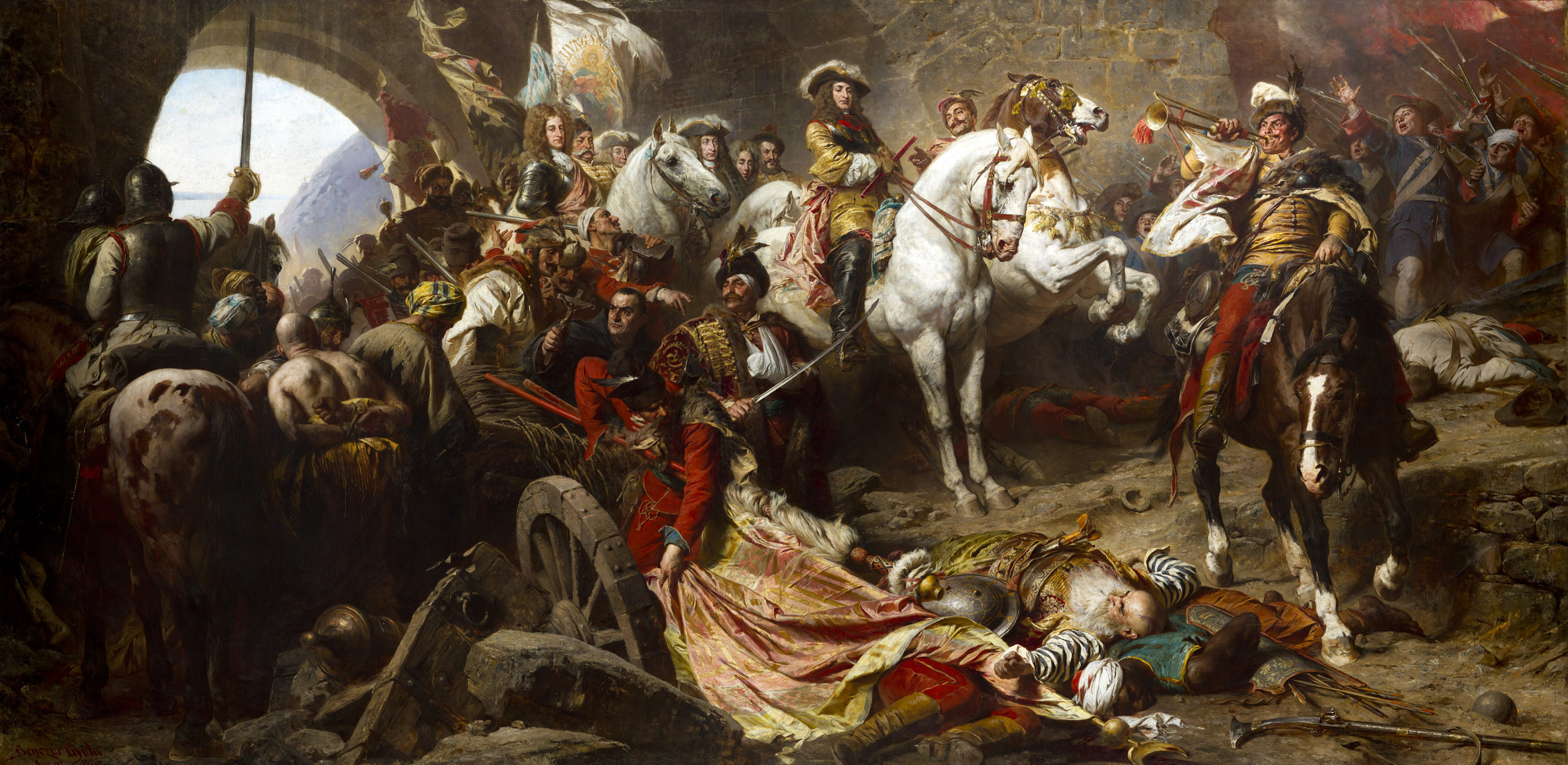
1896 painting of the siege of Buda by Gyula Benczúr. A deceased Pasha is depicted on the bottom of the painting by observed by Eugene.

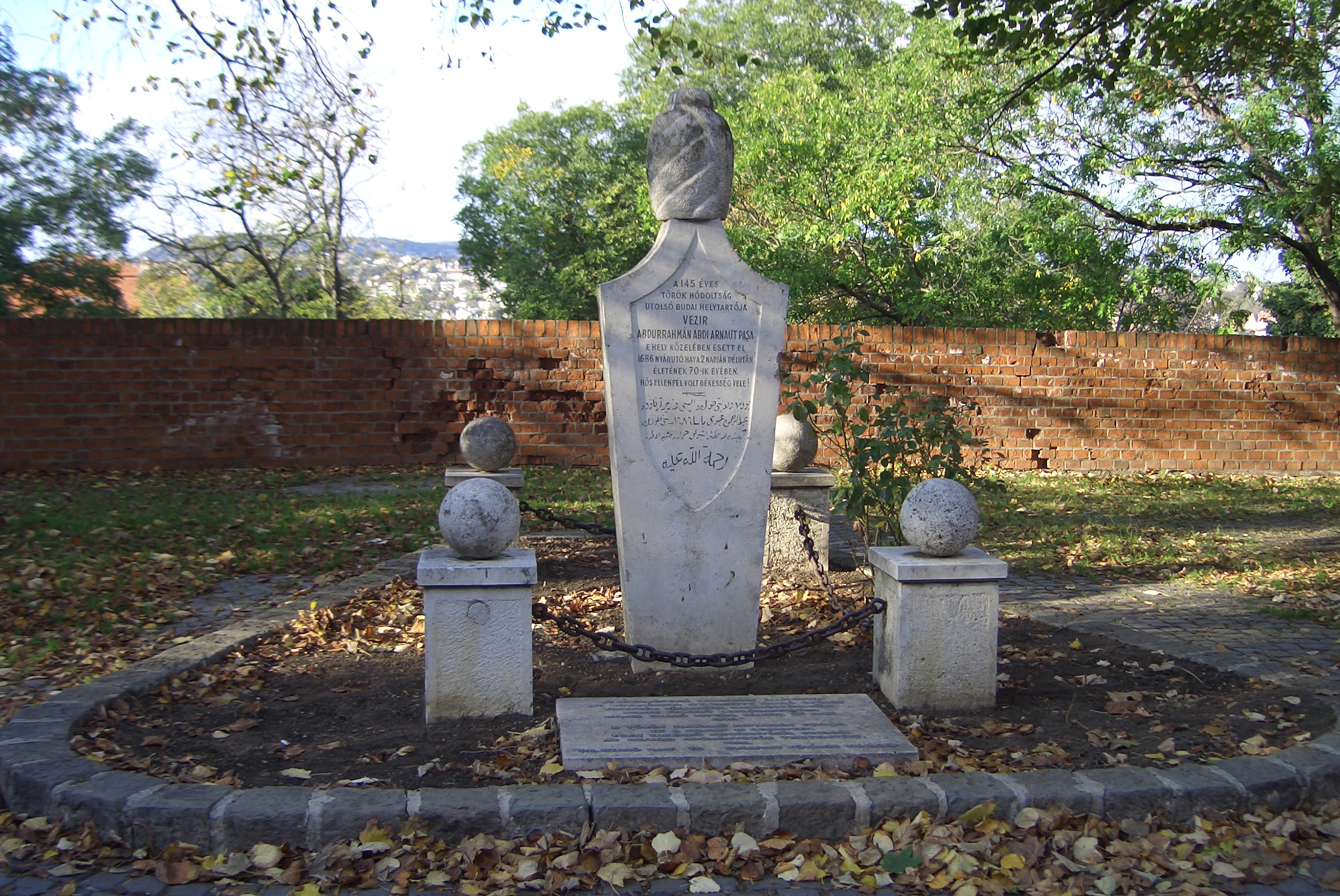
Memorial of Abdurrahman Pasha in Buda Castle

The relief forces of Grand Vizier Suleiman never arrived to support the troops within Buda. After more than 2 months of bombardment and a series of unsuccessful attacks, the city was reduced to ashes in the first days of September 1686. 3000 of his troops survived, but Abdurrahman Pasha himself was killed in the first lines when on September 2, the troops of the Habsburg emperor breached the northern walls ending 145 years of Ottoman rule over Buda.

A memorial to the late commander, the last vizier of Buda, stands on the Anjou bastion of the Buda castle, halfway between the Military History Museum and the Vienna Gate. The memorial was erected in 1932 by the descendants of György Szabó, who was a Hungarian soldier of the liberating army and also fell on this spot on September 2. The inscription, in Hungarian and Turkish, says: “The last governor of the 145 year Turkish sovereignty Abdurrahman Abdi Arnavut Pasha died near this place in the afternoon of the 2nd of September 1686, in the 70th year of his life. He was a heroic enemy, may he rest in peace!"

== See also ==
- Abdurrahman Pasha Mosque in Peqin, Albania
- Peqin Castle
- Peqin Clock Tower
- Battle of Buda
- List of Ottoman governors of Egypt

Political offices
Preceded by Cebeci Ahmed Pasha	Ottoman Governor of Egypt; 1676–1680	Succeeded by Osman Pasha the Bosnian
