= European Centre for Press and Media Freedom =

- Abbreviation: ECPMF
- Formation: 24 June 2015
- Legal status: European Co-Operative (SCE)
- Headquarters: Leipzig, Germany
- Board of directors: Lucie Sýkorová (Chair of the Supervisory Board), Henrik Kaufholz (Chair of the Executive Board)
- Key people: Andreas Lamm (Interim Managing Director)
- Website: ecpmf.eu

The European Centre for Press and Media Freedom (ECPMF) is a non-profit organisation that promotes, protects and defends the right to a free media and freedom of expression throughout Europe. It was founded in 2015 as a watchdog of the European Charter on Freedom of the Press. The vision of the European Centre for Press and Media Freedom is a society where media freedom enables open discourse and everyone can seek, receive and impart information. The main activities of the ECPMF are monitoring press and media freedom violations, advocacy and practical help for journalists, such as legal support and a "journalists-in-residence" programme, and engaging diverse stakeholders across Europe.

== History ==
In 2009, 48 editors-in-chief and leading journalists from all over Europe convened, and formulated the European Charter on Freedom of the Press. The goal of the initiative was to assert the charter's validity across Europe and to make its adoption a condition in EU accession negotiations. The Charter was handed over to the European Commission in Brussels on 9 June 2009 and to the Council of Europe in Luxembourg on 26 October 2009.

With the establishment of the Charter, it was necessary both to implement it, and to found an organisation which would oversee this implementation. The supporters of the Charter established a strong network of partners from across Europe, which were academics, unions, investigative journalism organisations, the media, campaigning and aid organisations, amongst other communities. Thus in June 2015, the ECPMF was founded as a non-profit European Cooperative Society (SCE) by 25 representatives from 16 countries in the fields of journalism, publishing and media law in Europe. Among them are the European Federation of Journalists, South East Europe Media Organisation (SEEMO), Index on Censorship (Index), Osservatorio Balcani e Caucaso Transeuropa (OBCT), Media Legal Defence Initiative, Association of Journalists of Macedonia, Ossigeno per l'informazione (Ossigeno), Independent Journalism Center, and the Media Foundation of Sparkasse Leipzig. The main initiator of the ECPMF was Hans-Ulrich Jörges, former member of the chief editorial office of the German magazine “stern”, who played a key role in conceptualising the European Charter on Freedom of the Press. A cross-party coalition at the European Parliament spearheaded by Martin Schulz (SPD), Alexander Graf Lambsdorff (FDP), and Elmar Brok (CDU) backed the initiative to form the centre.

== Location ==
The centre is located in Leipzig, Saxony, Germany. The city was chosen to root the centre's work in the tradition of the peaceful revolution of 1989, which fought for press freedom and to overthrow the GDR regime. It was at the Leipzig Media Congress, held by the Media Foundation of the Sparkasse, in October 2010 on the 10th anniversary of the creation of its Prize for the Freedom and Future of the Media, that Hans-Ulrich Jörges, an initiator of the Charter, introduced the idea of creating a European Centre to work for the Freedom of the Press. Shortly after that Congress, the Media Foundation began working on a concept to serve as the basis for a search for new project supporters. Amongst them are members of the European Parliament (especially its President Martin Schulz), the Free State of Saxony, the City of Leipzig as well as the German Federal Ministry of Foreign Affairs. The ECPMF is located at the Media Foundation's headquarters in Leipzig.

== Structure and finance ==
The ECPMF cooperative had 39 members at the beginning of 2019. They constitute the General Meeting, which is the highest body of the organisation. According to the statute, this body is responsible for electing the members of the supervisory and executive boards. The executive board employs the managing director. Each member has one vote and must buy at least one share of the cooperative. All members have to obey the Code of Conduct.

The centre started within a pilot project, funded at 70% by the European Commission. The Media Foundation of Sparkasse Leipzig, the Chancellery of Saxony, the German Foreign Ministry, and City of Leipzig provided additional third-party funding for the centre. Some projects and activities like the Journalists-in-Residence programme receive funding from other donors, such as the National Endowment for Democracy, the German Foreign Office, the Open Society Foundations, and the German Ministry for Culture and Media.

The EPCMF's budget is roughly 1 million euros per year. As the centre defines itself as a network and European hub for activities defending press and media freedom, it shares its budget with partner organisations.

== Network ==
The ECPMF creates a network for the otherwise fragmented media and journalism community in Europe, bringing together individuals, academic bodies, unions, investigative journalism organisations, media industry, campaigning and aid organisations. It supports and coordinates the activities of its members. Together with local and international members and partners it organises solidarity, covering the broader European continent from Portugal to Russia and from Norway to Malta. Keys partners of the ECPMF include ARTICLE 19, the European Federation of Journalists (EFJ), Free Press Unlimited (FPU), the Institute for Applied Informatics at the University of Leipzig (InfAI), International Press Institute (IPI), and CCI/Osservatorio Balcani e Caucaso Transeuropa (OBCT).

== Activities ==
=== Media Freedom Rapid Response ===
The Media Freedom Rapid Response (MFRR) is a Europe-wide mechanism, which tracks and reacts to press and media freedom violations in EU Member States and Candidate Countries. This project provides legal and practical support, public advocacy and information to protect journalists and media workers. The MFRR is organised by a consortium, led by the ECPMF and many of its partner organisations. It is co-funded by the European Commission. The mechanism was set up following increasing threats to press and media freedom across Europe, including the murders of Daphne Caruana Galizia, Jan Kuciak and Martina Kusnirova, Kim Wall and Lyra McKee. Additionally, the use of vexatious lawsuits to stifle journalistic inquiry, expanded state censorship, and the amending of national legislation to marginalise the press, prompted the development of a continent-wide, coordinated response. The MFRR comprehensively documents press and media violations on the Mapping Media Freedom platform.

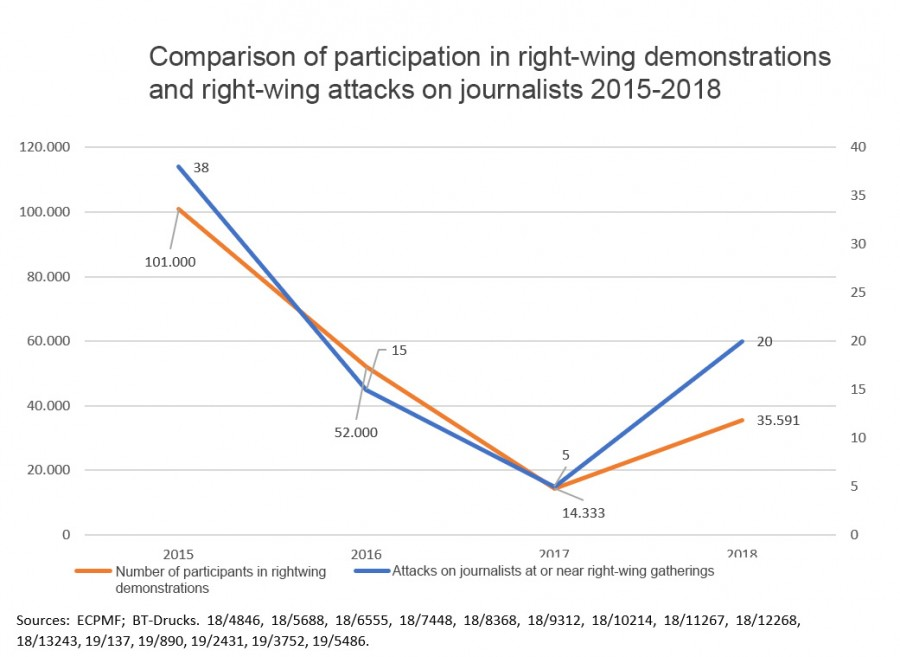
Comparison of participation in right-wing demonstrations and right-wing attacks on journalists 2015-2018

=== The "Concept of the Enemy" reports on Germany ===
Since 2015, the ECPMF has been examining politically motivated attacks on journalists in Germany. The phenomenon became virulent with the rise of right-wing demonstrations and the denunciation of journalists as “Lügenpresse” (lying press). The reports investigate how such a "concept of the enemy" influences the willingness to commit violence, and document fact-checked cases of physical attacks against journalists. The reports were widely shared and quoted, including in the international press.

=== Journalists in Residence ===
The Journalists in Residence scheme offers a temporary safe haven to journalists who are under threat. Journalists relocate to Leipzig and in a secure and safe environment can continue their investigative work at their own pace, while taking part in training courses and networking opportunities. According to the ECPMF, the programme "is designed to allow journalists to work outside the hostile environment for some time, to extend their personal networks, and to highlight press freedom problems in their home countries – if individual circumstances permit this". For example, Michelle Demishevich, a Turkish journalist gained employment as a TV presenter in Germany following the residency.

=== Fact Finding Missions ===
The ECPMF regularly organises fact finding missions to various countries across the wider European continent. The aim is to report on cross-cutting issues affecting media and press freedom, and to draw from experiences and best practices in different settings. The missions undertake interviews with journalists, trade unions, politicians and civil society organisations who are under threat. Several reports from these missions have been published, including on best practice in defending media freedom in Denmark and Sweden, the 'Judicial Silencing of the Fourth Estate' in Turkey, and Media Freedom in turbulent times in Croatia.

=== Press Freedom Police Codex ===
On 4 December 2019 the ECPMF launched the Press Freedom Police Codex, an eight-point code on how the police and media workers can work amicably together. The codex is based on research into areas of contention between the two professions, for example police violence, surveillance, accreditation, protection of sources and confiscation of journalistic materials. According to the ECPMF, the codex "is designed to give police and media professionals a clear set of guidelines on how to safeguard press and media freedom”.

=== Other activities ===
The ECPMF's Help Desk offers support to individuals from the journalism community who are at risk or face threats. Support is provided in the form of professional qualifications or training, legal support, language coaching and preventative safety measures. The ECPMF also has a Women's Reporting Point which encourages female media workers to report gender-based harassment or violence they encounter in their work. Legal support is also given by the ECPMF, for example in national or international litigation and in defamation or whistleblowing cases.

== The European Charter on Freedom of the Press ==
The European Charter on Freedom of the Press is regarded as the “birth certificate” of the ECPMF. The Charter was signed by 48 editors-in-chiefs and leading journalists from 19 European countries in 2009 in Hamburg. It is available in several European languages on its homepage.

== See also ==
- Media freedom
