= Gjoçaj =

Gjocaj
- Administrative unit
- Location within Albania
- Coordinates: 41°2′N 19°43′E
- Country: Albania
- County: Elbasan
- Municipality: Peqin

Population (2011)
  - Administrative unit: 5,207
- Time zone: UTC+1 (CET)
  - Summer (DST): UTC+2 (CEST)

Gjocaj is a village and a former municipality in the Elbasan County, central Albania. At the 2015 local government reform, it became a subdivision of the municipality Peqin. The population at the 2011 census was 5,207. The municipal unit consists of the villages Gjocaj, Celhakaj, Hasmashaj, Kurtaj, Vashaj, Rrumbullak, Bregas, Bardhas and Blinas.
