= Osservatorio Balcani e Caucaso Transeuropa =

Italian think tank

- Osservatorio Balcani e Caucaso Transeuropa
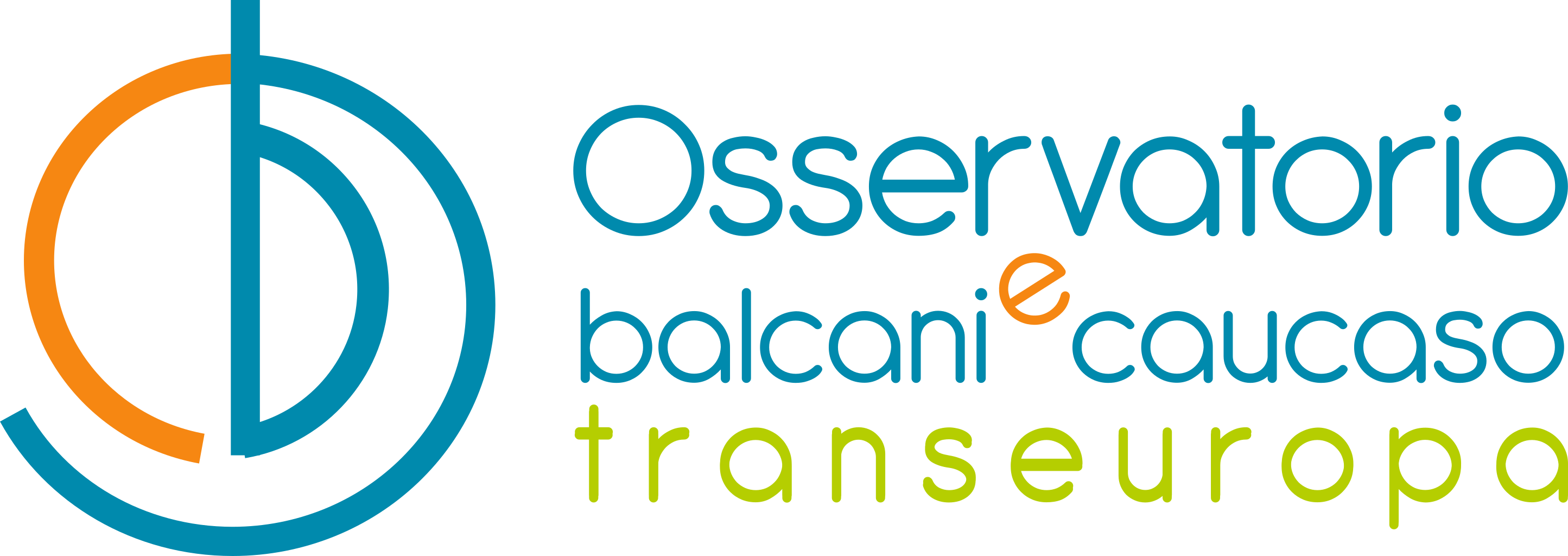
- Abbreviation: OBC Transeuropa, OBCT
- Formation: 2000
- Type: think tank, online media
- Headquarters: Trento, Italy
- Official language: Italian, English, Serbo-Croatian
- Scientific Director: Luisa Chiodi
- Website: www.balcanicaucaso.org/eng
- Formerly called: Osservatorio sui Balcani; Osservatorio Balcani e Caucaso

Osservatorio Balcani e Caucaso Transeuropa (OBC Transeuropa or OBCT) is a think tank and online newspaper based in Trento, Italy, and specialised on South East Europe.

It reports on social, cultural and political developments across 6 EU member states, 7 candidate and potential candidate countries, and 5 countries of the Eastern Partnership (as well as de facto states) through a network of 50 correspondents from abroad, including journalists, researchers, and activists, publishing news, analysis and multimedia on a daily basis. Its archives hosts more than 10,000 items. It also produces and circulates research papers, scientific books and educational toolkits, and makes use of crowd-sourcing, social media and online debates as a bottom-up strategy. All its contents are available on Creative Commons licenses.

OBC is a cross-medial, multilingual and transnational news hub, targeting CSOs, journalists, students and researchers, policy-makers, business, migrants, and the general public. Its activities combine online journalism, research, training, knowledge dissemination and policy advice.

Its themes of interest include conflict transformation, politics of memory, active citizenship, the European public sphere, media freedom, EU enlargement, the European Neighbourhood Policy, international cooperation, local development, human rights, minority rights, migration and asylum, gender and welfare; all seen from a bottom-up, transnational perspective.

== History ==
Launched in the year 2000 (then "Osservatorio sui Balcani") as a forum of dialogue among civil society organizations, it aims to support transnational relations to promote the European integration of South East Europe, the development of democracy at EU level, and the easing of the East/West divide within Europe.

As an autonomous project within the Peace Bell Foundation (Fondazione Opera Campana dei Caduti) based in Rovereto, OBC was supported by the Trentino Forum for Peace and Human Rights, and financed by the Department for International Cooperation of the Autonomous Province of Trento and the Municipality of Rovereto, in Italy. OBC also signed a long-term partnership agreement with the European Parliament, and it has won grants and projects from the Italian Ministry of Foreign Affairs, the European Union, private foundations, state and private organisations.

In September 2013, OBC was subject to a hacking attack aimed at an article about corruption in the oil sector in Azerbaijan.

In 2016 it changed its name to Osservatorio Balcani e Caucaso Transeuropa (OBCT).

In 2017 OBCT moved to Trento and became an operational unit of the newly founded International Cooperation Centre (Centro per la Cooperazione Internazionale), an association between the Autonomous Province of Trento, the municipalities of Trento and Rovereto, the Peace Bell Foundation and the University of Trento.

OBC is partner of the Leipzig-based European Centre for Press and Media Freedom, for whom has developed and run the Online Resource Centre on Media Freedom.

== Praise and accolades ==
The Economist journalist Tim Judah defined OBC as "Italy's top website for, as its name suggests, Balkan and Caucasus affairs". In a Lonely Planet guide Annalisa Bruni defines OBC Transeuropa as a ""reliable source of news about politics and culture of the Balkans".

Several of the articles, reportages and video documentaries on OBC website won national and international prizes. OBC also won the "Antonio Russo" Journalism Prize on War Reporting in 2010, Internet section.

== See also ==
- Western Balkans
- European Centre for Press and Media Freedom
