= Ahmeti =

Ahmeti is an Albanian surname. Notable people with the surname include:

- Ali Ahmeti (born 1959), Albanian politician
- Berat Ahmeti (born 1995), Kosovar footballer
- Kleviol Ahmeti (born 1986), Albanian singer, rapper, songwriter and Internet personality
- Liridon Ahmeti (born 1985), Kosovar–Albanian footballer
- Luran Ahmeti (1974–2021), Albanian actor
- Malush Ahmeti (1951–1999), notable commander of the Kosovo Liberation Army
- Mimoza Ahmeti (born 1963), Albanian poet
- Sadri Ahmeti (1939–2010), Albanian painter and poet
- Sevdije Ahmeti (1944 – 2016) Kosovar–Albanian and former Yugoslavian human rights activist
- Shemsi Ahmeti (1969–1999), Albanian commander
- Sherif Ahmeti (1920–1998), Albanian teacher, imam, commentator and translator
- Shpend Ahmeti (born 1978), Kosovar politician
- Vilson Ahmeti (born 1951), Albanian politician
