= Siege of Kamenets =

1672 siege

Coordinates: 48°40′24″N 26°33′45″E

- Part of the Polish–Ottoman War (1672–76)
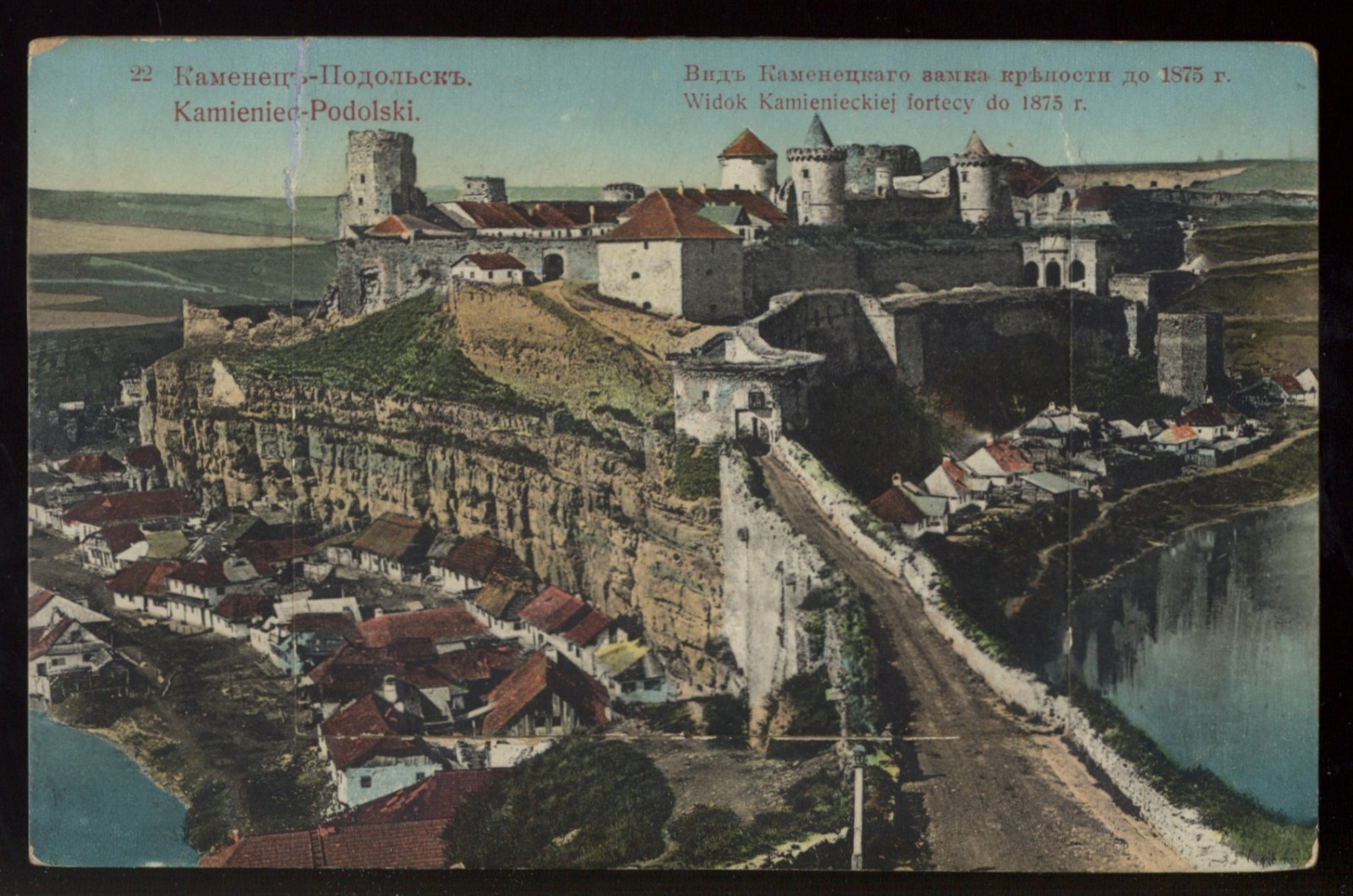
- Kamianets-Podilskyi Castle until 1875
Date	18–27 August 1672
Location	Kamianets-Podilskyi
Result	Ottoman victory

Belligerents
Polish–Lithuanian Commonwealth	Ottoman Empire; Crimean Khanate; Cossack Hetmanate; Moldavia; Wallachia; Lipka Tatars

Commanders and leaders
Jerzy Wołodyjowski; Mikołaj Potocki; Wespazjan Lanckoroński	(Ottoman Empire) Mehmed IV (Ottoman Empire) Köprülü Fazıl Ahmed Pasha "Commander" (Ottoman Empire) Abdi Pasha the Albanian; Selim I Giray; Petro Doroshenko; George Ducas; Grigore I Ghica

Strength
1,500 troops	120,000 troops 100 guns

Casualties and losses
500	5,000–8,000 killed 10,000 wounded

The siege of Kamieniec Podolski (Polish: Oblężenie Kamieńca Podolskiego; Turkish: Kamaniçe kuşatması) was laid by the Ottoman Empire on August 18, 1672, in the Polish fortress of Kamieniec Podolski (now: Kamianets-Podilskyi, Ukraine). It lasted until August 27, when Polish forces defending the city capitulated. During the siege, legendary Polish hero, stolnik przemyski pułkownik Jerzy Wołodyjowski led many successful sallies with light cavalry.

Kamieniec Podolski, known as the "key to Podolia", had heavy, but obsolete fortifications, and a garrison of about 1500 soldiers (Poles and Lithuanians). The Ottoman army was under command of Köprülü Fazıl Ahmed Pasha and numbered 150 thousand soldiers with reinforcements from the army of Tatars, Moldavians, Wallachians and Cossacks. Polish forces were commanded by Starosta of Podole, Mikolaj Potocki, and consisted of several units, such as infantry regiment of Bishop of Kraków Andrzej Trzebicki, two regiments of Captains Wasowicz and Bukar, permanent garrison of Major Kwasiborski, and other smaller units under Jan Mokrzycki, Jerzy Wolodyjowski, Rotmeister Myliszewski, Chorazy Wojciech Humecki, Stolnik Stanislaw Makowiecki, and Czesnik Jozef Wasilkowski. Polish forces of some 1,500 were inadequate to successfully defend such a large fortress.

First Crimean Tatar units appeared near Kamieniec Podolski on August 12, and two days later, main Ottoman army camped by the town. After building seven large sconces, Turkish artillery began a barrage with its 120 modern cannons. It paralyzed Polish defence, and on August 20, the Turks managed to score a direct hit in one of the towers of the Old Castle, which served as an ammunition depot. The tower blew up in a large explosion, which was followed by a Turkish attack on Kamieniec. Poles managed to defend the fortress, but with very heavy losses. After the attack, Mikolaj Potocki decided to abandon the New Castle, under which Turkish miners dug deep tunnels, placing explosives in them. The Old Castle with its medieval walls was not prepared for a modern siege, and Potocki’s decision placed the defenders in a very difficult position. On August 25 the Turks dug a tunnel under one of the towers, and managed to destroy it. Another attack followed, again repelled by the Poles.

On August 26, 1672, Potocki decided to capitulate and on August 30, Polish forces left Kamieniec. The Pasha entered the city three days later. Turkish occupiers remained in Kamieniec for 27 years, until 1699. In 1692, to stop a possible Turkish attack, Hetman Stanislaw Jan Jablonowski built the stronghold of Okopy Swietej Trojcy some 20 kilometres (12 mi) from Kamieniec.

On October 17, 1672, Poland signed the Treaty of Buczacz, wherein Poland and Lithuania agreed to pay a yearly tribute of 22,000 ducats to the Turks. However, these arrangements were not accepted by the Polish parliament. A new army was assembled, at the head of which Hetman Jan Sobieski crushed the Turks at Chocim in November 1673. The war lasted until 1676. Kamieniec returned to Poland in 1699, following the Treaty of Karlowitz.

== Bibliography ==
- Davies, Brian L (2007). Warfare, State and Society on the Black Sea Steppe, 1500-1700. London: Routledge. ISBN 9780415239851.
