= European Charter on Freedom of the Press =

The European Charter on Freedom of the Press is a non-binding guideline on press freedom, signed on 25 May 2009 in Hamburg by 48 editors-in-chief and leading journalists from 19 European countries. It is open for signature by all journalists, e.g. the prohibition of censorship, free access to national and foreign media sources and freedom to gather and disseminate information.

== Content ==
The Charter condense in 10 articles the main media freedom principles, including the right to safety from surveillance, electronic eavesdropping and searches of editorial departments and computers, and remarks the need for unimpeded access for journalists and citizens to all domestic and foreign sources of information. It formulates the main values that public authorities - including EU institutions - should respect when dealing with journalists.

== History ==
The idea of the Charter was born in 2007 out of the yearly policy dialogue which started in 2005 between European Commissioner Viviane Reding (assisted by the Commission's Media Task Force) and the editors-in-chief of European newspapers, headed by Stern's Hans-Ulrich Jörges.

The Charter was handed to the European Commission in Brussels on 9 June 2009 and to the Council of Europe in Luxembourg on 26 October 2009, with the aim that it may become a benchmark in their assessment exercises on media freedom in member and candidate countries, and that it may empower journalists across Europe in their relations with state authorities.

== Initial Signers of the Charter ==
Name	Company	Country
Alekseeva, Anastasia	Chastniy Korrespondent	Russia
Alfter, Brigitte	Author	Denmark
Bačević, Batić	Nin	Serbia
Berkan, Ismet	Radikal	Turkey
Biljanoski, Mitko	Dnevnik	Macedonia
Bitiniece, Daiga	Kurzemnieks	Latvia
Brender, Nikolaus	ZDF	Germany
Cândea, Ştefan	Centre of Investigative Journalism	Romania
Dervishi, Lutfi	Tirana Times	Albania
Gaede, Peter-Mathias	Geo	Germany
Gude, Hubert	FOCUS	Germany
Hríb, Štefan	Týždeň	Slovakia
Jõgis-Laats, Jan	Eesti Päevaleht	Estonia
Jörges, Hans-Ulrich	stern	Germany
Kaufholz, Henrik	Politiken	Denmark
Keese, Christoph	Axel Springer AG	Germany
Klusmann, Steffen	Financial Times	Germany
Kostyuchenko, Elena	Novaya Gazeta	Russia
Kotanko, Christoph, Dr.	Der Kurier	Austria
Leyendecker, Hans	Süddeutsche Zeitung	Germany
Liedtke, Klaus	National Geographic	Germany
Lisicki, Pawel	Rzeczpospolita	Poland
Mika, Bascha	taz	Germany
Mikhailov, Sergei	MK-Estonia	Estonia
Montik, Ivan	Bigmir.net	Belarus
Müller von Blumencron, Mathias	Der Spiegel	Germany
Naß, Mathias	Die Zeit	Germany
Nikitinsky, Leonid	Novaya Gazeta	Russia
Nutt, Harry	Frankfurter Rundschau	Germany
Osterkorn, Thomas	stern	Germany
Pecanin, Senad	Dani	Bosnia and Herzegovina
Petzold, Andreas	stern	Germany
Quoos, Jörg	BILD	Germany
Rediske, Michael	Reporter ohne Grenzen	Germany
Rose, Flemming	Jyllands-Posten	Denmark
Rousselot, Fabrice	Libération	France
Rozentāle, Anita	Bauskas Dzīve	Latvia
Rozum, Yan	Telegraf	Belarus
Sabalic, Ines	Globus	Croatia
Smajlović, Ljiljana	Association of Serbian Journalists	Serbia
Stoldt, Hans-Ulrich	Der Spiegel	Germany
Taino, Danilo	Corriere della Sera	Italy
Tillack, Hans Martin	stern	Germany
Turturică, Dan Cristian	Romania Libera	Romania
von Trott, Thilo, Dr.	Gruner + Jahr AG & Co KG	Germany
Wergin, Clemens	Die Welt	Germany
Zõbina, Jevgenia	Linnaleht	Estonia
Zörner, Hendrik	German Federation of Journalists (DJV)	Germany

== See also ==
- Media freedom
- European Centre for Press and Media Freedom
