= Cllevio =

Albanian singer (born 1986)

- Born: Kleviol Ahmeti; 1986 (age 39–40); Lushnjë, PSR Albania
- Genres: Hip hop Rap
- Occupations: Singer, rapper, songwriter
- Instrument: Vocals
- Years active: 2006–present

Kleviol Ahmeti (born 1986), known professionally as Cllevio and previously known as Cllevio Dubai 44, Cllevio Masoni 44, Cllevio Serbiano and Hudra a.k.a Problemi, is an Albanian singer, rapper, songwriter and internet personality known for his controversial nature. He is active both in music and on online platforms, particularly TikTok.

== Early life ==
Ahmeti was born in Lushnjë, Albania. He lived for 11 years in the Bronx, New York, United States, where he became affiliated with the Albanian-American rap collective TBA (The Bloody Alboz). The group included artists such as Unikkatil, Don Phenom, Klepto, and Kobra. During this time, he used the name Hudra aka Problemi.

== Career ==
Ahmeti began recording music in the mid-2000s. He later worked with other artists including Presioni, OG043, and Ledi Vokshi. The song "Ktu apo Atje", featuring Ledi Vokshi, Presioni, and OG043, was published with a music video.

After returning to Albania, he continued producing songs, often describing personal or autobiographical content. Some of his tracks have circulated online without accompanying music videos. Songs such as "Paridi", "Buzëqeshje Cinike", "1 ëndërr e gjatë", "44 Buza", and "Ironi Kirurgu" have been shared on digital platforms.

=== Business ventures ===
Ahmeti has also been involved in business activities outside music. He is associated with the eyewear brand 44 Eyewear, which he co-founded with designer Patrik Tola. The brand focuses on eyewear design and was developed as a collaboration between a music artist and an optical professional.

== Legal issues ==
In 2014, Ahmeti was arrested in connection with a drug trafficking case involving an aircraft crash on the beach in Divjakë, Albania. Italian pilot Giorgio Riformato and Ahmeti’s brother were also involved. Ahmeti was sentenced to six years in prison and released in 2020.

On 19 March 2021, he was arrested again in Albania. He was released on 19 April 2022 after serving a 13-month sentence. Later, he was detained again for one month for violating house arrest during a reported altercation with rapper Rigels Rajku (known as Noizy).

On 16 April 2023, Ahmeti was detained at Tirana International Airport following a complaint by Noizy and his father, who alleged that Ahmeti had issued threats via TikTok. Ahmeti denied these allegations.

== Discography ==
Selected songs:

- "Paridi"
- "Buzëqeshje Cinike"
- "1 ëndërr e gjatë"
- "44 Buza"
- "Ironi Kirurgu"
- “44 Blinda”
- "Ktu apo Atje" (feat. Presioni, OG043, Ledi Vokshi)
