= International Research & Exchanges Board =

Nonprofit organization

IREX (International Research & Exchanges Board)
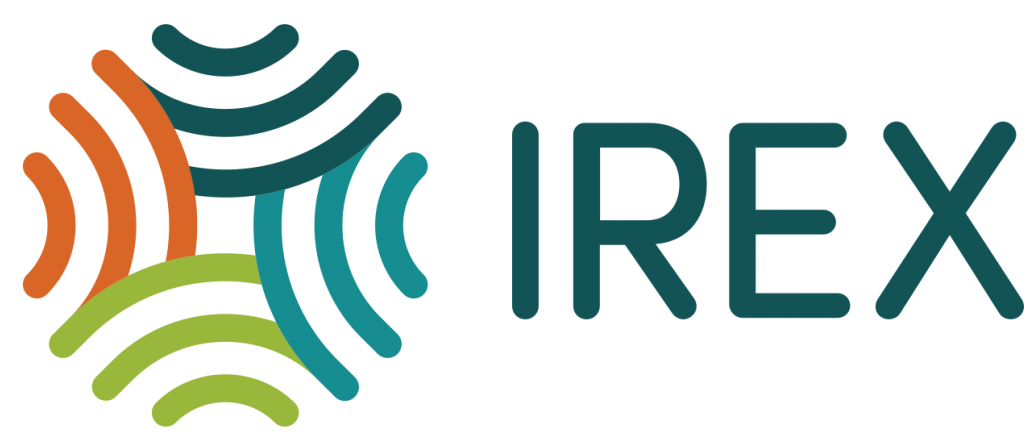
- Founded: 1968
- Type: 501(c)3
- Tax ID no.: 22-3087809
- Purpose: Education, leadership, digital development
- Headquarters: Washington, D.C., United States
- Region served: International
- Product: International development
- Key people: Aleksander Dardeli (President)
- Revenue: $154.9 million (Fiscal year ended June 30, 2025)
- Website: www.irex.org

The International Research & Exchanges Board (IREX) is an American nonprofit organization based in Washington, D.C., that runs international exchange, education, leadership, and media development programs. It is primarily funded by U.S. government grants.

== History ==
IREX was established in 1968 by the American Council of Learned Societies, the Ford Foundation, the Social Science Research Council, and the US Department of State.

Since 1968, IREX has invested in people, communities, and institutions. IREX was created to bridge geopolitical divides and spread U.S. influence abroad by fostering the exchange of scholars, teachers, students, and ideas. IREX then built its expertise and network of relationships in Eurasia to become a leader in improving access to information technology and empowering youth through education and leadership development. As global needs shifted, IREX brought this expertise to new regions—first Asia, then the Middle East and Africa, then Latin America.

Throughout these decades of change, its focus on people and communities has been steady. IREX and its private sector, government, and other organizational partners have worked in more than 100 countries to empower youth, cultivate leaders, strengthen institutions, and extend access to quality education and information.

In 2026, IREX was designated as an undesirable organization in Russia.

== See also ==
- Human development
- International education
- Leadership development
- Media development
- Positive youth development
- Soft power
