= Sparkasse Leipzig =

German public bank

Coordinates: 51.3466°N 12.3736°E

Stadt- und Kreissparkasse Leipzig
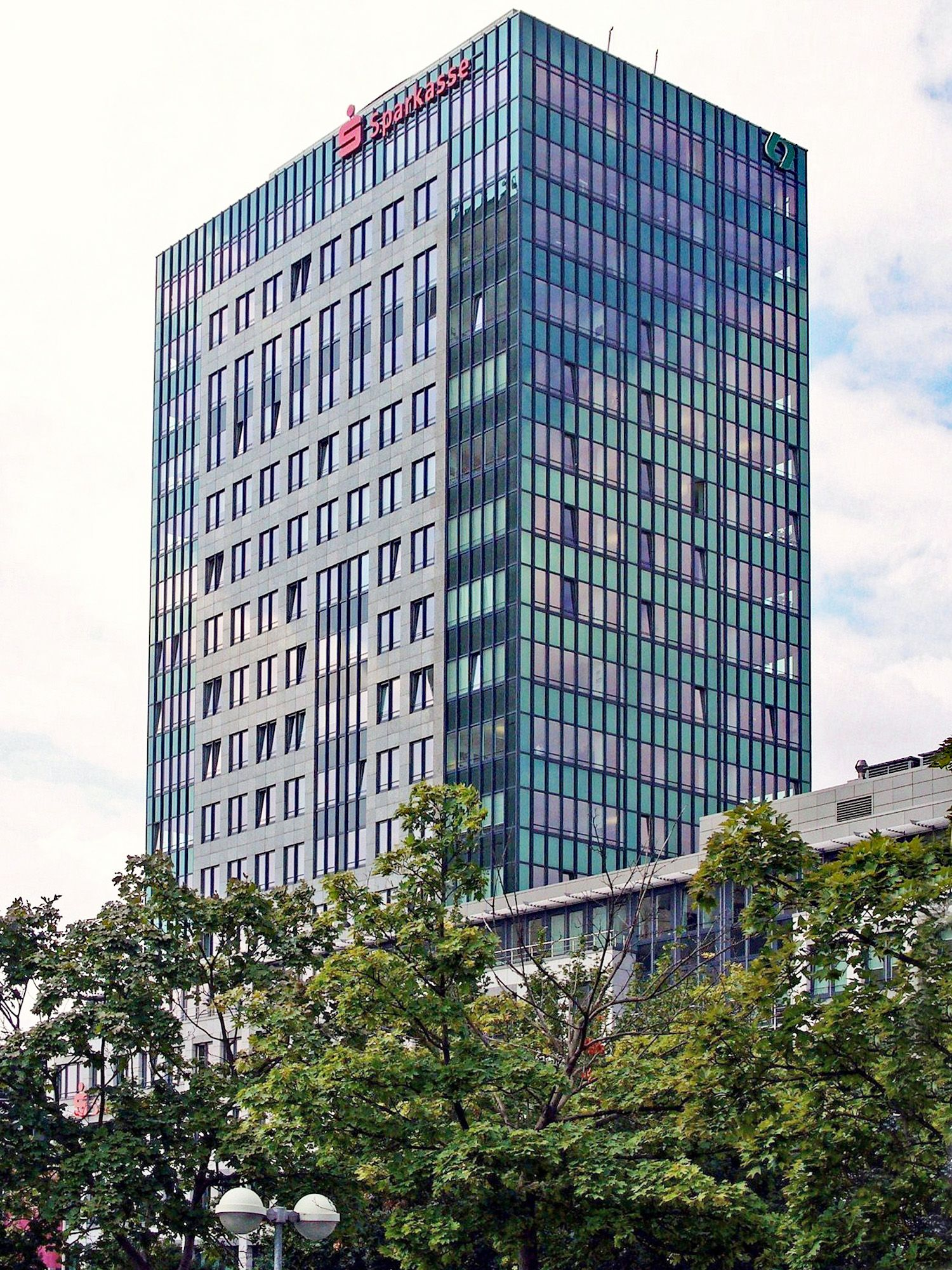
- Type: Anstalt des öffentlichen Rechts
- Industry: Banking, financial services
- Founded: 1826; 200 years ago
- Headquarters: Leipzig, Germany
- Area served: Leipzig, the Nordsachsen and Altlandkreis Leipziger Land
- Key people: Harald Langenfeld Executive chairman
- Products: Consumer banking, corporate banking, finance and insurance, investment banking, mortgage loans, private banking, private equity, savings, securities, asset management, wealth management, credit cards
- Total assets: € 8.9 billion (2014)
- Number of employees: 1,663 (2014)
- Website: www.sparkasse-leipzig.de

Sparkasse Leipzig, in full Stadt- und Kreissparkasse Leipzig ("City and Regional Saving Bank of Leipzig") is a Sparkasse, a public savings bank, based in Leipzig, Saxony. It is one of the largest financial institutions in Germany.

Its business area comprises the city of Leipzig, the Nordsachsen and Altlandkreis Leipziger Land for a size of approximately 3,085 square kilometers. As of 2014, Sparkasse Leipzig had total assets for 8,902 billion euros and customer deposits for 7,153 billion euros. According to the Savings Bank Ranking in 2014, it is by total assets ranked 18th; it maintained 135 branches and employed 1,663 staff.

== History ==
The savings bank opened in 1826 at Löhrs Carré. Influential citizens of the city had suggested the establishment of an institution, which should allow the interest-bearing and secure investment of funds.

By 2024, Sparkasse Leipzig was the third largest savings bank in the new states of Germany after the Ostsächsische Sparkasse Dresden and the Mittelbrandenburgische Sparkasse.

== Organizational structure ==
The Sparkasse Leipzig is a trustee institution under public law. Carrier is the Sparkassenzweckverband für die Stadt- und Kreissparkasse Leipzig and the Land Nordsachsen. The Savings Bank is a member of the East German Savings Bank Association (Ostdeutscher Sparkassenverband). The legal basis of the credit institution is the savings bank law of the Federal State of Saxony and the Statute of the Sparkasse.

The management-bodies of the savings bank are the board of directors and the executive board. The chairman of the board is the Leipzig Mayor Burkhard Jung. The executive chairman is Harald Langenfeld. Private Clients Management Board is Martin Bücher. Corporate-board is Andreas Koch. Andreas Nüdling is deputy member.

== Social commitment ==
As a public institution, the Sparkasse Leipzig is committed to its business area. In addition to the foundation (Stiftung) it has a Savings Bank Museum and a Kunsthalle, granted an insight into its collection of works of the New Leipzig School. In addition, the bank acts as a partner of associations and institutions, thus demonstrating its support for the common good.

== The Sparkasse Leipzig Foundation ==
=== Media Foundation of Sparkasse Leipzig ===
The main purpose of the Media Foundation is to promote the education and training of young people in the field of media. These include the awarding of merit scholarships, for example in the context of the Leipzig Media Prize, targeted project funding and the organization of events on political education, about to commemorate the fall of 1989 in Leipzig.

=== Cultural and Environmental Foundation of Sparkasse Leipzig Leipziger Land ===
To mark its 175th anniversary in 2001, the Sparkasse Leipzig decided to create the Cultural and Environmental Foundation Leipziger Land. The work of the Foundation was presented in October 2001 in a ceremony to the public. The Foundation deals with the history of the former district of Leipziger Land, nature conservation and landscape conservation, environmental protection and the training of young people from this region. The promotion of cultural interests of the literature on performing and visual arts to heritage conservation are also among the tasks of the Foundation.

=== Sparkassenstiftung for the region Torgau-Oschatz ===
The purpose of this foundation is to promote culture and heritage conservation within the territory of the Torgau-Oschatz Altlandkreises from the proceeds of the endowment. The foundation's aims are realized through the promotion of music, literature, performing and visual arts and their institutions. In addition, the Foundation is committed through the acquisition and management of works of art, including the holding of exhibitions and cultural events such as concerts and art exhibitions. The earmarked funds to tax-deferred awarding bodies or public corporations to acquire art works and art objects is one of the tasks of the Foundation. Furthermore, their portfolio includes the foundation of art prices and promoting heritage conservation in accordance with the law for the protection and maintenance of monuments in the former district Torgau-Oschatz. This is done through the provision of earmarked funds for the conservation and restoration of monuments.

=== The Kunsthalle der Sparkasse Leipzig ===
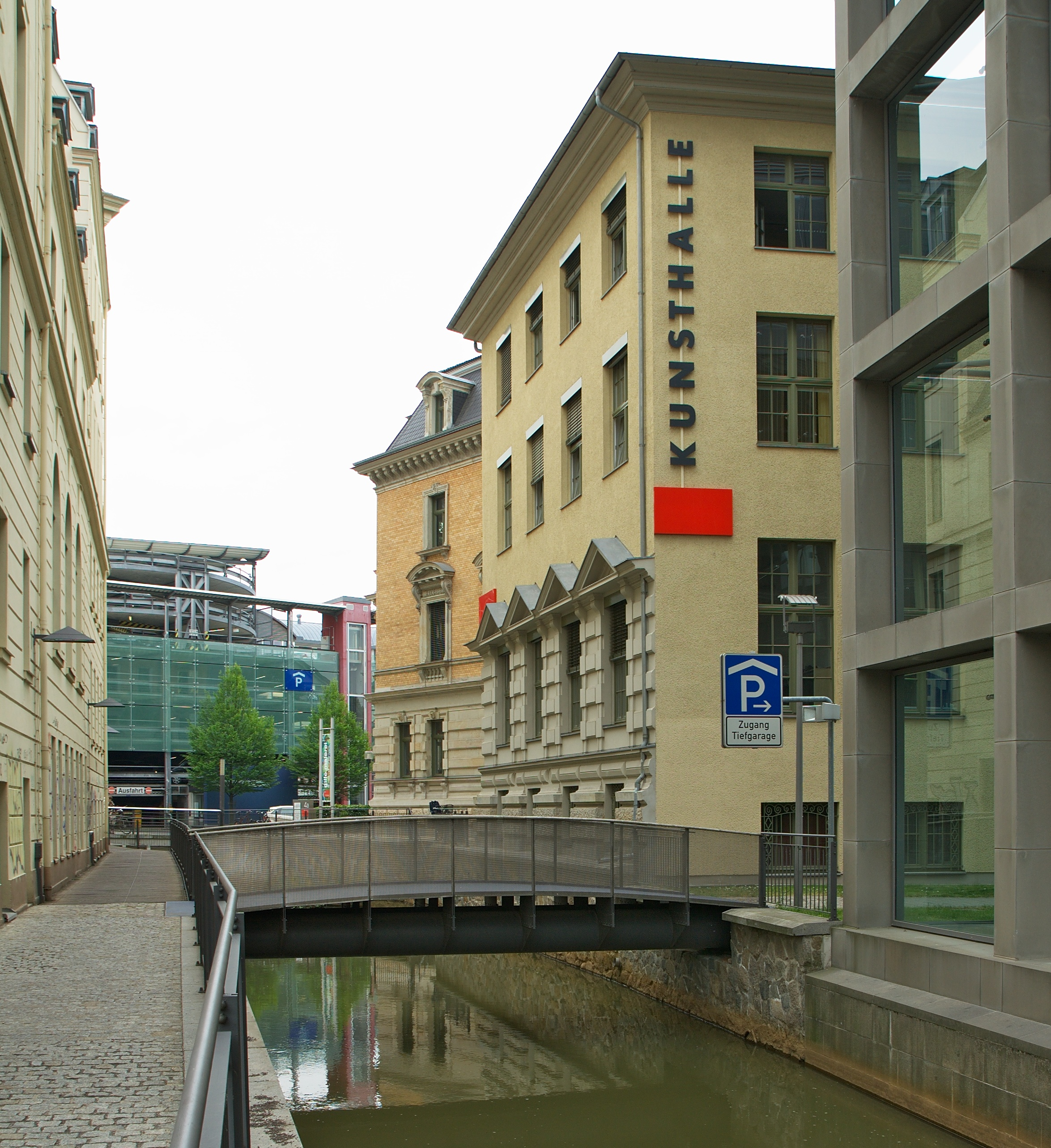
Kunsthalle der Sparkasse Leipzig, 2011

The Kunsthalle is located at one of the oldest savings bank locations in Leipzig. Acquired in 1914 by the Sparkasse, the building was its main location until the Second World War and its expropriation in 1950. Since 1994, it is again in possession of the Sparkasse, and it has been extensively renovated. The Kunsthalle has 352 m^{2} of exhibition space in the annex from 1924, right on the banks of the splices mill race and shows works from the collection of the Sparkasse Leipzig. With around 3000 exhibits of 150 artists who live and work in and around Leipzig, it holds the largest collection of "Leipzig School".

=== Sparkasse Leipzig Museum ===
The permanent exhibition of the Sparkasse Museum is divided into five chapters of the Leipziger Sparkasse history - from the first initiative of the Leipzig Sparkasse founder up to the financial service of the present. In the background it shows the social, economic and political developments of the 19th and 20th centuries. Visitors can see the first major book of Sparkasse Leipzig (1826-1838), one of the first armored safes from the mid-19th century, savings books and currencies from different eras, office machinery and equipment from the last century, and historical advertising among other things.

== See also ==
- List of banks in Germany
