= Tzanavaras =

Tzanavaras is a surname. Notable people with the surname include:

- Panagiotis Tzanavaras (born 1964), Greek footballer
- Pavlos Tzanavaras (born 1969), Greek runner
