= Fatime Xhaka =

Albanian activist (1952–1999)

- Born: 28 March 1952; Vushtrri, PR Serbia, FPR Yugoslavia (modern Kosovo)
- Died: 15 April 1999 (aged 47); Mitrovica, FR Yugoslavia (modern Kosovo)
- Citizenship: Yugoslavia
- Title: Teacher, Activist and Chair of the Independent Sports League of Mitrovica

Fatime Xhaka (28 March 1952 – 15 April 1999) was a Kosovo Albanian physical education teacher, sports leader and activist from Mitrovica. During the Kosovo War, she was among the many intellectuals targeted and executed by Serbian police forces, alongside her husband, Musli Xhaka.

== Life ==
Fatime Xhaka was born in Vushtrri, Kosovo, on March 28, 1952. She pursued studies in physical education and became a teacher. Xhaka worked for many years in the primary schools of Mitrovica, most recently at the "Musa Hoti" Primary School (formerly "Meto Bajraktar"). From 1996 until 1999, she was the chair of the Independent Sports League of Mitrovica. Fatime Xhaka was executed by Serbian police forces, along with her husband Musli Xhaka, on April 15, 1999, during the Kosovo War in front of her house in Mitrovica.

== Legacy ==
In 2000, former Partizani Sports Center in Mitrovica was renamed in her honor.
