= Peqin Castle =

Coordinates: 41.0448°N 19.7498°E

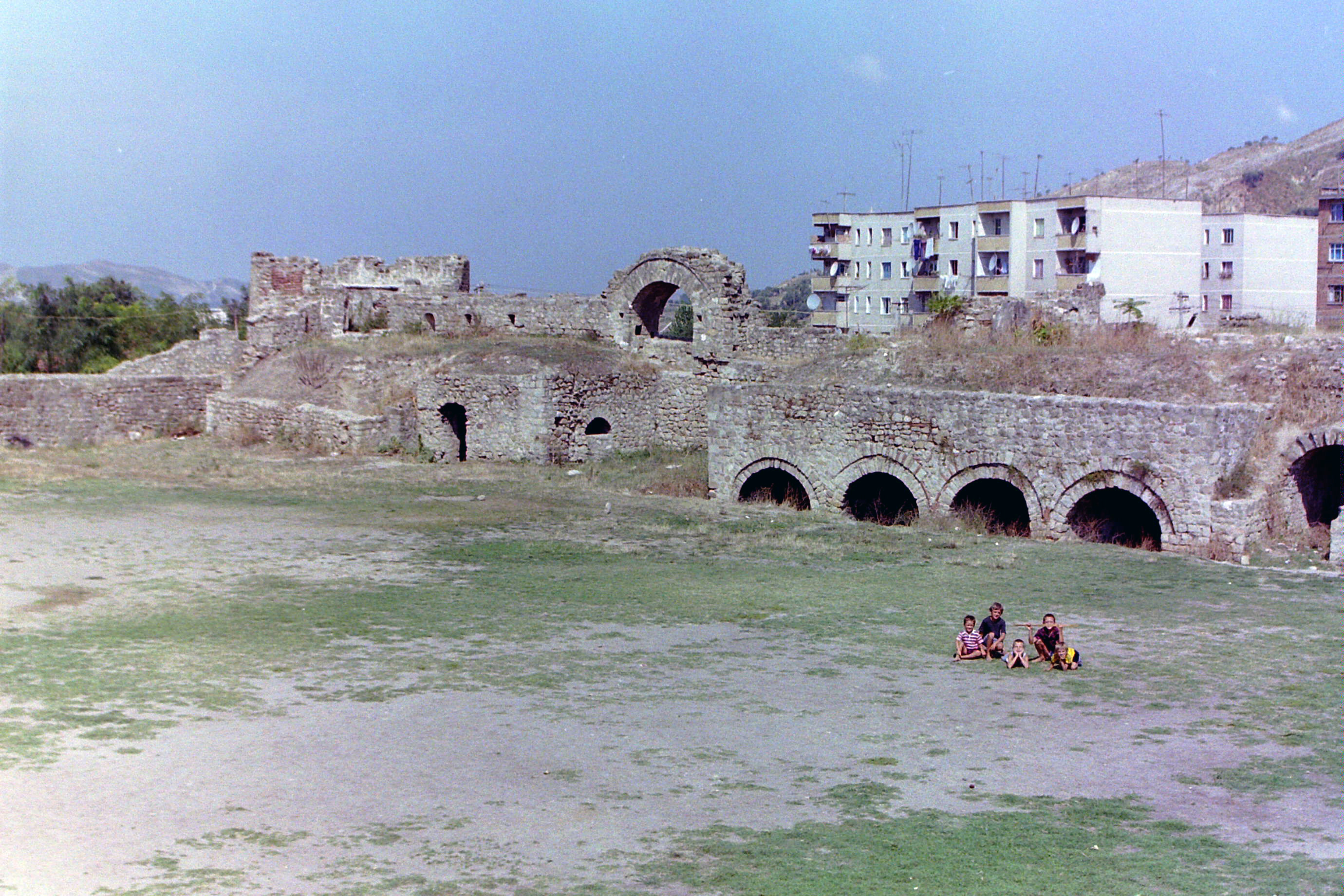
View from the inside of the castle in 1995

The Peqin Castle (Albanian: Kalaja e Peqinit) is a ruined Ottoman Turkish castle in Peqin, Albania.

In the Roman times the city was known by the name of Claudiana, an Illyrian-inhabited territory. The foundations of the castle are thought to date from the Roman period, the time of the construction of the Via Egnatia. Its walls at one point had a height of around 12 metres (39 ft). The castle was later rebuilt and expanded during the Turkish occupation of Albania, at which time it was passed into the control of the Sipahi (lord) of the local fief, who added a palace and a harem. The last resident of the castle was Demir Pasha.

The 17th-century historian Evliya Çelebi mentioned the fortress in his writings:

...the walls of this castle reach about 12 m in height. Within resides the dizdar, along with 70 soldiers. There are five cannons in the castle, and ten small houses roofed with tiles. There is also a small mosque with no minaret. On the left side of the castle, connected to a wall, is a prayer chapel (namazgja)...

The castle was equipped with tunnels which served as exits several km away from the city in difficult times. Similarly, clay pipes have been found in the walls of the castle, which archaeologists believe is an indication that water was supplied from outside the castle during wartime.
