= Përparim, Elbasan =

Përparim
- Administrative unit
- Location within Albania
- Coordinates: 41°3′N 19°48′E
- Country: Albania
- County: Elbasan
- Municipality: Peqin

Population (2011)
  - Administrative unit: 3,423
- Time zone: UTC+1 (CET)
  - Summer (DST): UTC+2 (CEST)

Përparim is a village and a former municipality in the Elbasan County, central Albania. At the 2015 local government reform it became a subdivision of the municipality Peqin. The population at the 2011 census was 3,423. The municipal unit consists of the villages Galush, Lisnaj, Bicaj, Çaushaj, Përparim, Fatishe, Garunje e Madhë, Arven, Gjevur, Kodras, Lolaj, Katesh, Cobane and Urucaj.
