= Dushku =

Dushku is an Albanian surname. Notable people with the surname include:

- Eliza Dushku (born 1980), American actress and producer
- Erjon Dushku (born 1985), Albanian footballer
- Judy Dushku (born 1942), American academic political scientist, journalist, writer, and humanitarian
- Nate Dushku (born 1977), American director, producer, and actor
- Rigers Dushku (born 1991), Albanian footballer
