= Clock Mosque =

Mosque in Peqin, Elbasan County, Albania

- Xhamia me Sahat
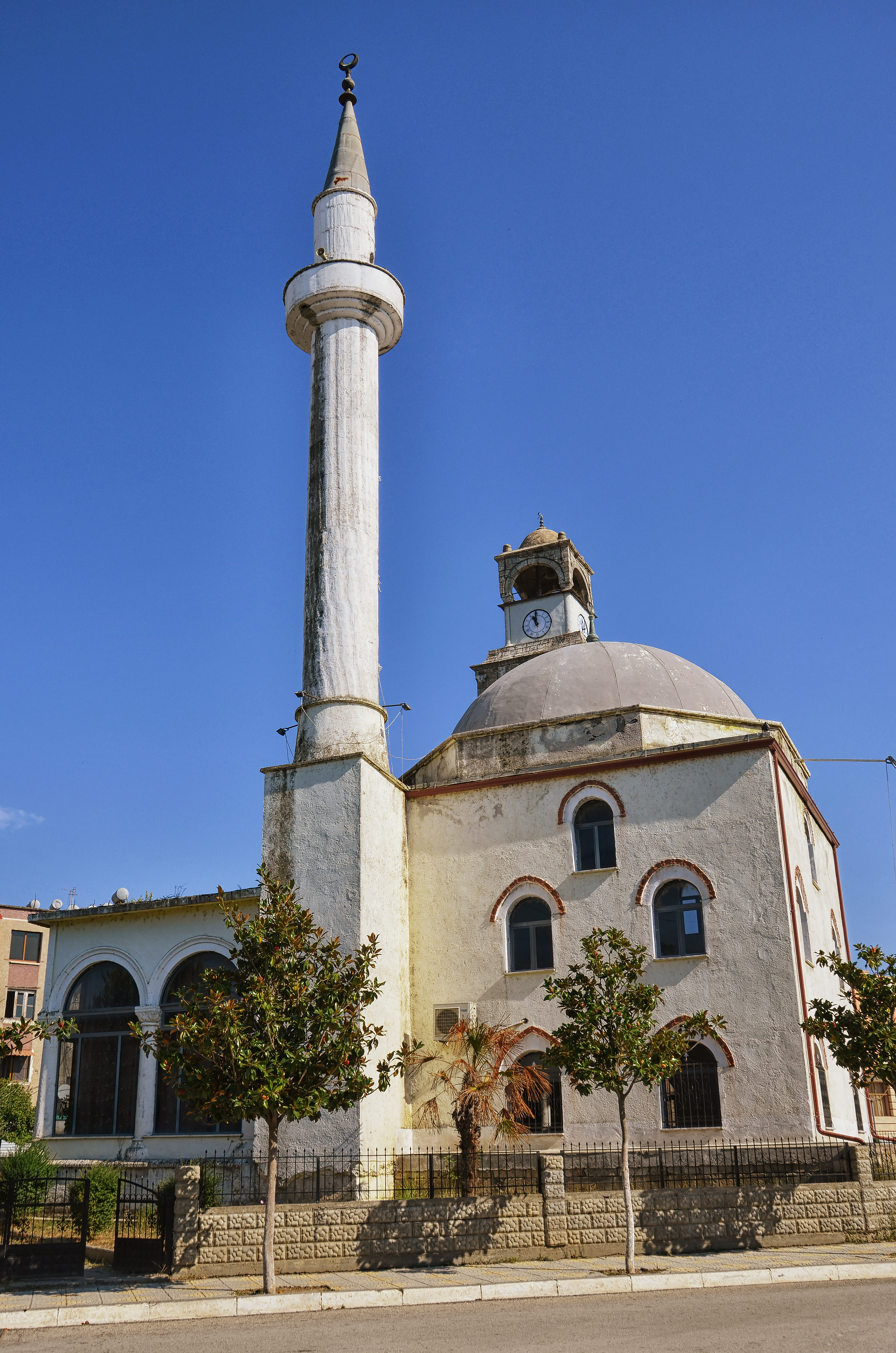
- The mosque in 2018

- Location of the mosque in Albania

Religion
- Affiliation: Islam
- Ecclesiastical or organizational status: Mosque: (1666 CE–1967); (since 1992– )
- Status: Active

Location
- Location: Peqin, Elbasan County
- Country: Albania
- Interactive map of Clock Mosque
- Coordinates: 41°02′45″N 19°45′02″E

Architecture
- Type: Islamic architecture
- Style: Ottoman
- Founder: Abdi Pasha the Albanian
- Completed: 1666 CE

Specifications
- Dome: 1
- Minaret: 1

Cultural Monument of Albania
- Official name: Clock Mosque

The Clock Mosque (Albanian: Xhamia me Sahat), officially known as the Abdurrahman Pasha Mosque (Albanian: Xhamia e Abdurrahman Pashës), and historically known as the Xhafer Sadik Pasha Mosque, is a mosque, located in Peqin, in Elbasan County, Albania. Completed in 1666, the remains of it was designated as a Cultural Monument of Albania.

== History ==
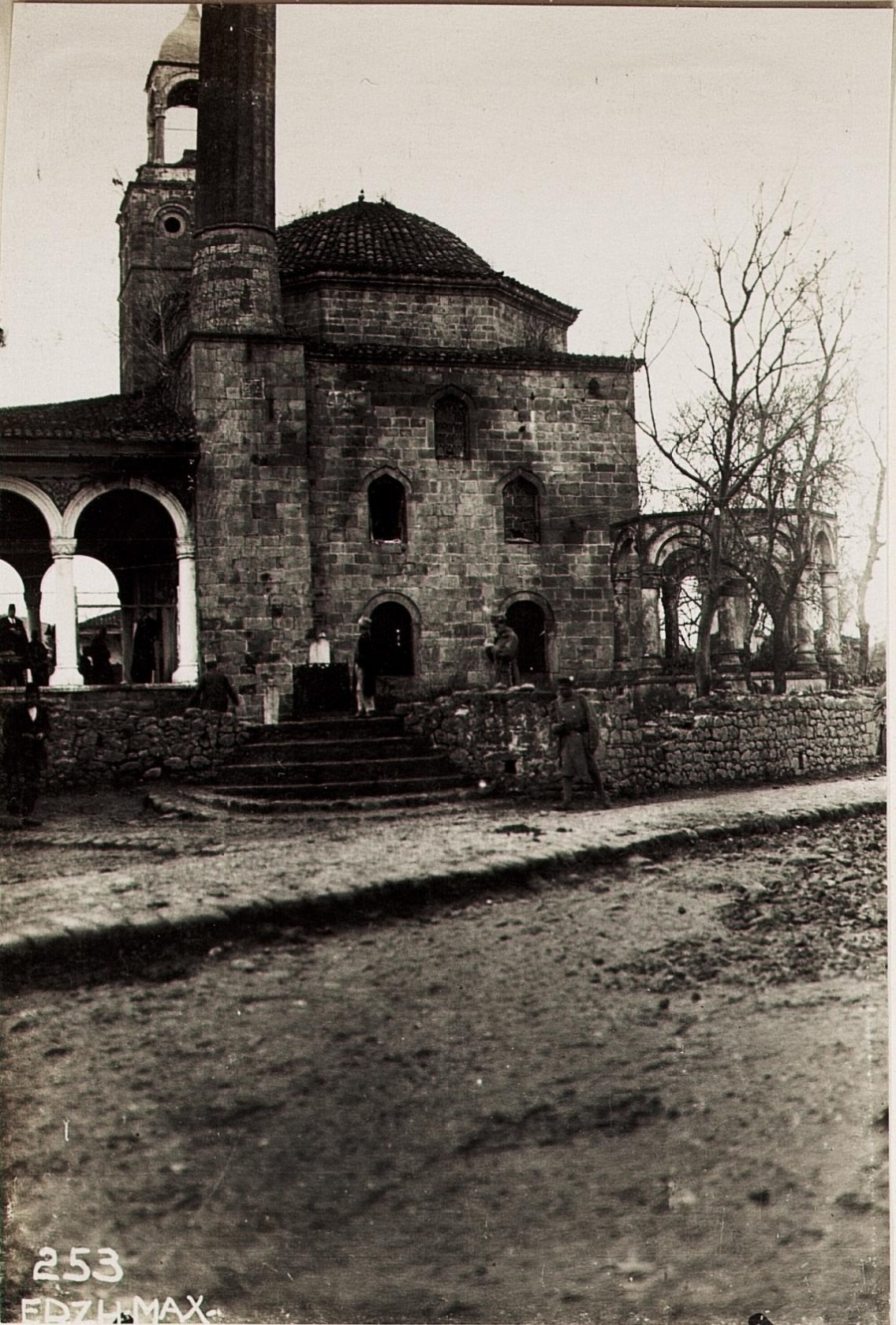
The historic stone mosque in 1917

The Old Mosque (Albanian: Xhamia e vjetër e Peqinit) was built in 1666 CE by Abdi Pasha the Albanian and resembled the Et'hem Bey Mosque in the Albanian capital Tirana. The mosque is located in the central square of the old town at the main route between Durrës and Elbasan. Later destroyed by a fire, it was rebuilt in the 1830s by a descendant of Abdi Pasha, Cafer Sadık Pasha. Between 1967 and 1974, the Communist regime demolished the prayer hall and minaret. The clock tower and the portico remained, but the latter was repurposed as a coffee bar. After the political transition the mosque was rebuilt, though not in its original form and without achieving the elegance of the original.

== See also ==
- Islam in Albania
- List of mosques in Albania
- List of Religious Cultural Monuments of Albania
