= Kriezis =

Kriezis (Greek: Κριεζής) is a Greek surname.

It may refer to:

- Antonios Kriezis (1796–1865), Greek military figure and politician
- Andreas Kriezis (c.1813 – c.1880), Greek painter
- Dimitrios Kriezis, Greek naval officer
