= Tzavaras =

Greek-origin surname

According to genealogical researchers, the surname Tzavaras (Greek: Τζαβάρας) can be classified as of patronymic / nickname origin.

It is either the Hellenization of the Albanian word çanavar which means "monster" or "brave", but within a historical context would signify “mercenary” and later on “janissary”; or a Byzantine compound surname made up of the prefix dia (tza), with a general meaning of “through”, but here understood as “origin” or “from”; and the term baros meaning “heavy”, but signifying “strong”.

== Origin ==
The origin of this modern Greek family name lies in the Middle Ages, in the city of Novo Brdo, Metohija, present day Kosovo. It was part of Vuk Brankovic’s realm and Pavle Orlovic’s fiefdom. Those who were empowered to act as Orlovic’s bodyguards or as a police force were known as čuvar (meaning “guardian” in Old Slavonic) and çanavar (meaning “brave” in Gheg Albanian).

But little after Pavle Orlovic's death fighting the Ottoman army in the Battle of Kosovo Polje, along with the end of the Serbian Empire, Novo Brdo finally fell on June 1. 1455. In the escape the majority chose the Kingdom of Hungary, where the core of the Serbian nobility had gathered to resist.

Others instead fled to Epirus, where the admixture with local populations gives birth to the Tzavareoi (Greek: Τζαβαραίοι) clan or “phara”.

The clan was to be again on the move. Some members had integrated into the Ghica family, so they were sent by the Ottomans to serve with the Phanariote administration in the Danubian Principalities of Moldavia and Wallachia. Inscriptions both in the Stavropoleos Monastery library and the grave yards of the Comănești palace cemetery give acquaintance about the existence of bearers of this surname in those regions.

The majority instead, established in the Kakosouli village, which was one of the main four villages in the Souliote Confederation. But fighting against the Ottoman enemy in the end caused the last huge migration of the clan reaching further lands like the Peloponnesus or the Ionian Islands. Those who were chased as klephtes found shelter the Arcadian highlands, meanwhile those who were tame peasants continued their journey on to Messenia settling mainly in Kyparissia and Filiatra.

== Notable people ==
- Stavros Tzavaras also known as “Hadji-Stavros”, a local chieftain who fought in the Battle of Valtetsi and later turned to brigandage and abduction of foreigners during the Bavarian regency, inspirator of the Roi des Montagnes novel and mentioned in The Dilessi Murders book by Romilly Jenkins. His house in Valtetsi now houses a Folklorical and Ethnological Museum.
- Gotsis Tzavaras, a kapetanios of the Greek War of Independence originally from Dara Mantineias in Arcadia, who took part in the capture of Tripolis and was appointed as elector for the Peloponnesian Senate in 1822.
- Stylianos Tzavaras, from Louka Mantineias in Arcadia, who together with a band of Sarakatsan and Vlach irregulars contributed to the defeat the Turkish army at the Battle of Mouzaki (March 1878) as part of the Wars of Liberation of Western Thessaly.
- Prokopios Tzavaras, metropolitan of Megalopolis, Gortyna, Mantinea and Korinthia who helped effectively in the hiding of British and ANZAC soldiers, as well as political and religious refugees during the Second World War and the Greek Civil War.
- Olga Tzavara was a Greek medal-winning sport shooter and "grande dame" of Greek shooting and a pioneer in women's shooting.

== Present ==
According to the investigation carried out by writer Thanasis Tzavaras in his book Agapite Aderfe Vasileie, as per 1999 in the Hellenic Telecommunications Organization catalogues there were 70 members of this family name living in Western Greece, 629 in the Attica region, 65 in the Boeotia and Thessaly regions and about 100 in the Peloponessus. There were less than 25 in Epirus, Macedonia and several Greek islands.

The Greek diaspora shows presence of Greek American and Greek Canadian bearers of this family name both in the United States and Canada, mostly located in Chicago, New York City, Los Angeles and Toronto, comprising the alterations Javaras, Zavaras, Tziavaras and Chiavaras.

The same things happens in Australia where telephone catalogues show a great number of pages with Australians of Greek descent having these surnames in both Melbourne and Sydney cities.

In South America there is also a recorded presence of people with the family name, both in Buenos Aires, Argentina and Antofagasta, Chile.
