= Lutfi Dervishi =

Albanian journalist, academic and television presenter (born 1967)

- Born: 22 September 1967 (age 58); Tirana, PSR Albania
- Education: University of Tirana
- Occupations: Journalist academic political commentator
- Years active: 1991–present

Lutfi Dervishi (born 22 September 1967) is an Albanian journalist, academic, television presenter and political commentator. He is the executive director of Transparency International Albania and a lecturer at the University of Tirana, and host of television program "Përballë" aired on Albanian Public Broadcast (RTSH).

== Early life and education ==
Dervishi was born in Tirana, Albania, on 22 September 1967. He graduated from the Faculty of Geology and Mining at the University of Tirana in 1991.

== Career ==
Dervishi began his career as a political journalist at the daily Republika (1991–1993), later serving as deputy editor-in-chief (1993–1995) and editor-in-chief (1995–1997). From 1997 to 2003, he was editor-in-chief of the newspaper Albania and also worked as a trainer at the Albanian Media Institute.

Between 2007 and 2008, he headed the Information Department of the Albanian Public Broadcaster (RTSH). He has also contributed as a commentator for Radio Free Europe, the BBC Albania, RFI, and the New York-based Albanian newspaper Illyria.

Since November 2008, he has served as executive director of Transparency International Albania, focusing on anti-corruption initiatives and transparency in public life.

In academia, Dervishi lectures on investigative journalism at the University of Tirana’s master's program and provides training on media ethics, transparency, and communication at the Albanian Media Institute.

== Publications ==
- Edhe për të qarë (1994)
- Compiler of the Code of Ethics for Albanian Journalists (1996, 2006)
