= Përparim Dervishi =

Albanian civil servant

Albanian Ambassador to Hungary
- In office 1997–1998
- Preceded by: Roland Bimo
- Succeeded by: Adhurim Resuli

Director General of Customs
- In office 12 September 2005 – 15 April 2009
- Preceded by: Shpëtim Idrizi
- Succeeded by: Endri Pema

Personal details
- Born: 29 August 1955 (age 69); Kavajë, Albania

Përparim Dervishi (born 29 August 1955) served as Albania's Director General of Customs from 2005 to 2009. In 1993 he was named as the first director of the National Privatisation Agency. Four years later Dervishi was appointed as the Ambassador of the Republic of Albania to Hungary. His career profession is teaching. He began teaching economics and business management in 1983 as a professor at Tirana University. Since 2009 Mr.Dervishi is involved as a full-time lecturer at the University of New York Tirana and is Head of the Business Administration Department.
