= Peqin =

- Municipality
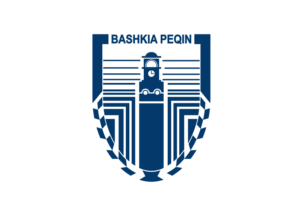
- Flag Emblem

- Location within Albania
- Coordinates: 41°2′45″N 19°45′00″E
- Country: Albania
- County: Elbasan

Government
  - Mayor: Bukurosh Maçi (PS)

Area
  - Municipality: 197.90 km^{2} (76.41 sq mi)
  - Administrative unit: 17 km^{2} (6.6 sq mi)
- Elevation: 48 m (157 ft)

Population (2023)
  - Municipality: 16,580
  - Municipality density: 83.78/km^{2} (217.0/sq mi)
  - Administrative unit: 4,753
  - Administrative unit density: 280/km^{2} (720/sq mi)
- Demonym: Peqins/e
- Time zone: UTC+1 (CET)
  - Summer (DST): UTC+2 (CEST)
- Postal Code: 3501
- Area Code: (0)512
- Website: peqini.gov.al

Peqin (Albanian pronunciation: [pecin], Albanian definite form: Peqini) is a town and municipality in Elbasan County, central Albania. The municipality was formed at the 2015 local government reform by the merger of the former municipalities Gjoçaj, Karinë, Pajovë, Peqin, Përparim and Shezë, that became municipal units. The seat of the municipality is the town Peqin. The total population is 16,580 as of the 2023 census, in a total area of 197.90 km^{2}. The population of the municipal unit as of the 2023 census is 4,753.

Historical population
Year	Pop.	±%
1955	3,069	—
1960	3,492	+13.8%
1969	4,700	+34.6%
1979	5,800	+23.4%
1989	6,568	+13.2%
2001	7,267	+10.6%
2011	6,353	−12.6%
2023	4,753	−25.2%

== History ==
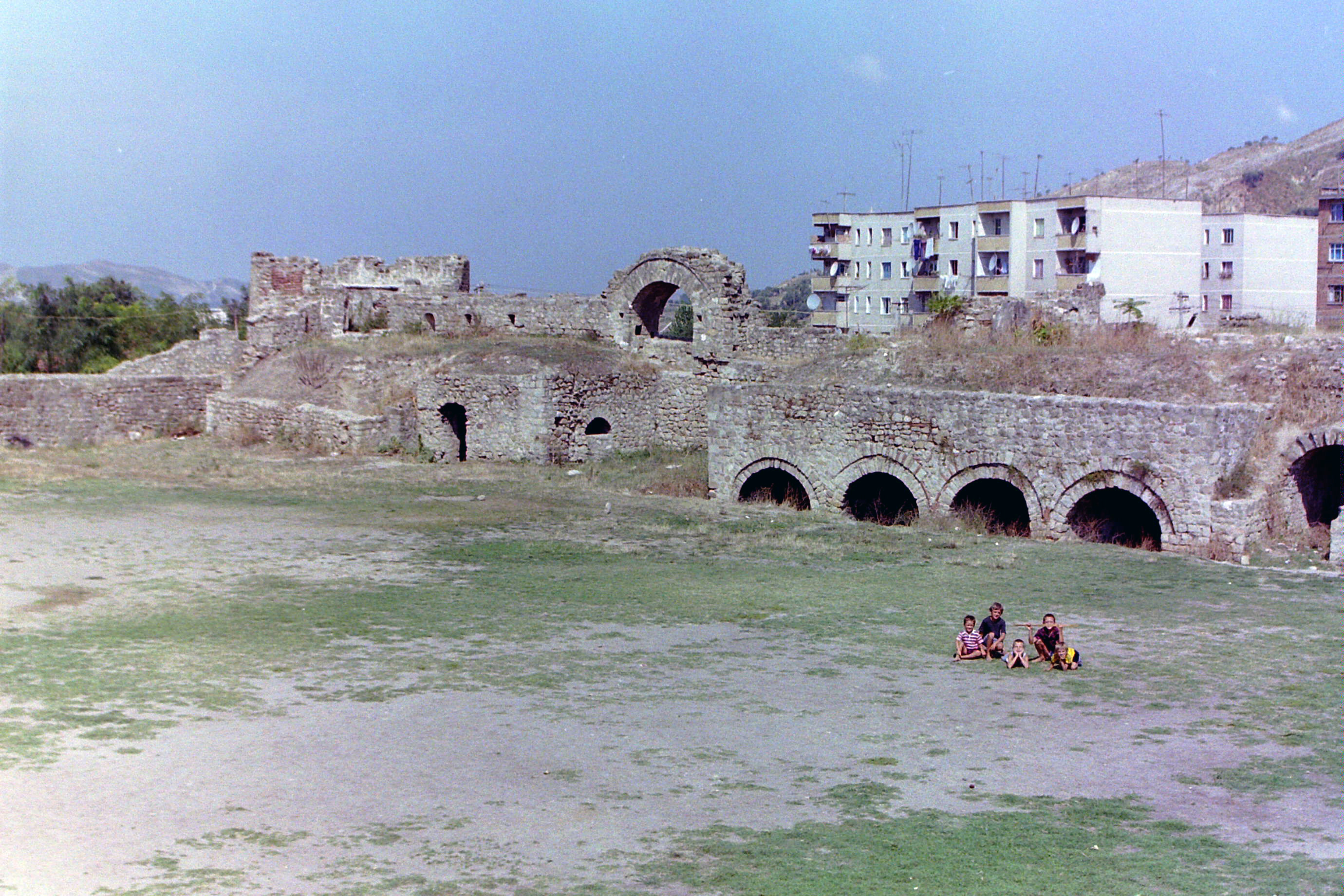
Peqin Castle

The city dates back 2700 years, it is mentioned as Illyrian fortress. The ancient name of Peqin was Claudiana/Clodiana. The city's modern name derives from the Ottoman form Bekleyin, which means a place of hospitality. During Ottoman rule Peqin belonged to the Sanjak of Elbasan. The Ottoman Peqin Castle still exists, along with some original parts of the mosque of Abdurrahman Pasha, who had been the governor of Wallachia and Moldavia (former Bogdania). This castle was also constructed during the Via Egnatia road being made. On the Via Egnatia road Peqin was another stop on the road and a settlement for soldiers and there were Pashas in the castle. The last remaining resident in the castle was Demir Pasha.

=== Historic places ===
- Peqin Castle
- Via Egnatia
- Orthodox church
- Protestant church
- Clock Mosque

== Transport ==
=== Bus ===
There are buses available at the center of the city which run to many places in and out of Albania.

=== Train ===
There is a train station in the city and trains pass by on the Durrës-Pogradec line.

=== Highway ===
There is the SH7 stateroad on the outer city ring of Peqin and starts in Rrogozhinë and ends in Bradashesh, Elbasan.

== Sports ==
The football team of Peqin is KS Shkumbini. The team was founded in 1951 and its home ground is Shkumbini Stadium with a capacity of 9,000 spectators. KS Shkumbini currently plays in the Albanian Second Division. KS Shkumbini is famous for its fans, called Besnikët, known as Faithful.

== Notable people ==
- Mustafa Gjinishi, activist during National Liberation War
- Hekuran Isai, post-World War II communist politician
- Gugash Magani, football player and manager
- Murat Manahasa, veterinary researcher and professor
- Abdurrahman Pasha, former governor of Wallachia and Moldavia within Ottoman Empire

== See also ==
- Clock Mosque
