= Konstantinos Koumoundouros =

Greek politician and navy officer (1846–1924)

- Κωνσταντίνος Κουμουνδούρος
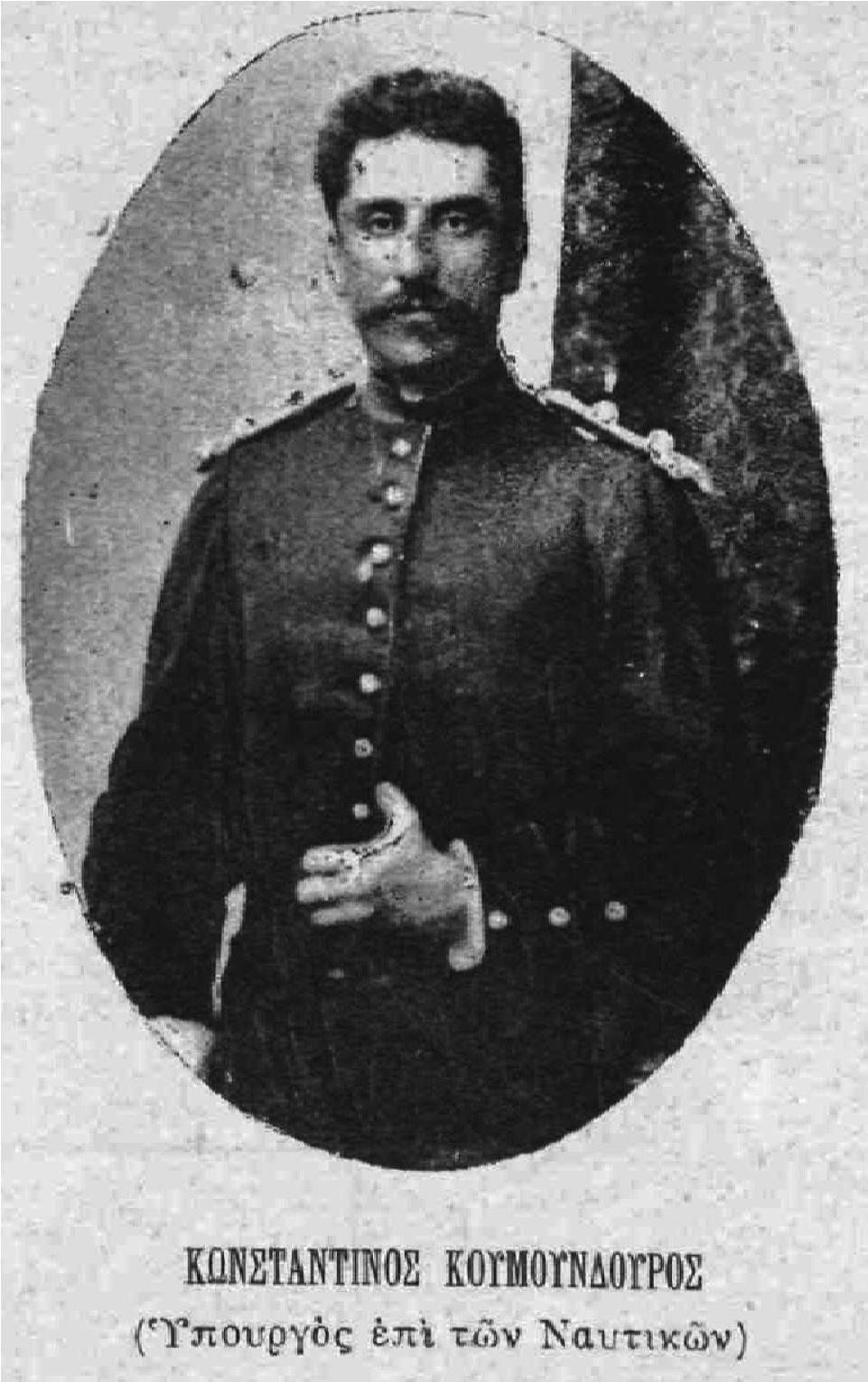
- Konstantinos Koumoundouros in uniform

Speaker of the Hellenic Parliament
- In office 1908–1909
- Monarch: George I
- Prime Minister: Georgios Theotokis

Minister of Military Affairs
- In office 14 April 1899 – 25 November 1901
- Monarch: George I
- Prime Minister: Georgios Theotokis

Minister of Naval Affairs
- In office 1890–1892
- Monarch: George I
- Prime Minister: Theodoros Deligiannis

Member of Parliament for Messenia
- In office 1879–1922
- Monarchs: George I Constantine I Alexander
- Prime Minister: Alexandros Koumoundouros; Charilaos Trikoupis; Theodoros Deligiannis; Dimitrios Valvis; Konstantinos Konstantopoulos; Sotirios Sotiropoulos; Nikolaos Deligiannis; Dimitrios Rallis; Alexandros Zaimis; Georgios Theotokis; Kyriakoulis Mavromichalis; Stefanos Dragoumis; Eleftherios Venizelos; Dimitrios Gounaris; Stefanos Skouloudis; Nikolaos Kalogeropoulos; Spyridon Lambros; Nikolaos Stratos; Petros Protopapadakis; Nikolaos Triantafyllakos; Anastasios Charalambis; Sotirios Krokidas

Personal details
- Born: 20 November 1846 Oitylo or Kalamata, Kingdom of Greece
- Died: 26 January 1924 (aged 78) Athens, Kingdom of Greece
- Resting place: First Cemetery of Athens
- Parent: Alexandros Koumoundouros
- Education: Hellenic Army Academy

Military service
- Allegiance: Kingdom of Greece
- Branch/service: Hellenic Army
- Years of service: 1871–1908
- Rank: Lieutenant General
- Battles/wars: Greco-Turkish War of 1897; Battle of Pente Pigadia

Konstantinos Koumoundouros (Greek: Κωνσταντίνος Κουμουνδούρος; 20 November 1846 – 26 January 1924) was an officer in the Hellenic Army as well as a politician.

== Biography ==
Konstantinos Koumoundouros was born at Oitylo or Kalamata in 1846, the son of the politician and multiple Prime Minister of Greece, Alexandros Koumoundouros (1817–1883). The younger Koumoundouros entered the Hellenic Army Academy, graduating in 1871 as an Ensign, while following in parallel a political career, being elected mayor of Oitylo and entering the Hellenic Parliament as an MP for his native Messenia in 1879, being repeatedly re-elected until 1922. Initially a supporter of Theodoros Deligiannis, under whom he served as Minister for Naval Affairs in 1890–92, Koumoundouros quarrelled with Deligiannis and went over to his rival, Charilaos Trikoupis.

In the Greco-Turkish War of 1897, Koumoundouros, with the rank of major, commanded a battalion in the Epirus front, and was defeated at the Battle of Pente Pigadia, losing a fifth of his troops. In 1899, he was appointed Minister of Military Affairs in Georgios Theotokis' cabinet. His last political office was as Speaker of the 18th Parliament in the 1908–1909 term. Koumoundouros was discharged from the Army in 1908, with the rank of lieutenant general.

He died at Athens in 1924.
