= 1899 Greek parliamentary election =

- 7 February 1899

All 235 seats in the Hellenic Parliament 118 seats needed for a majority
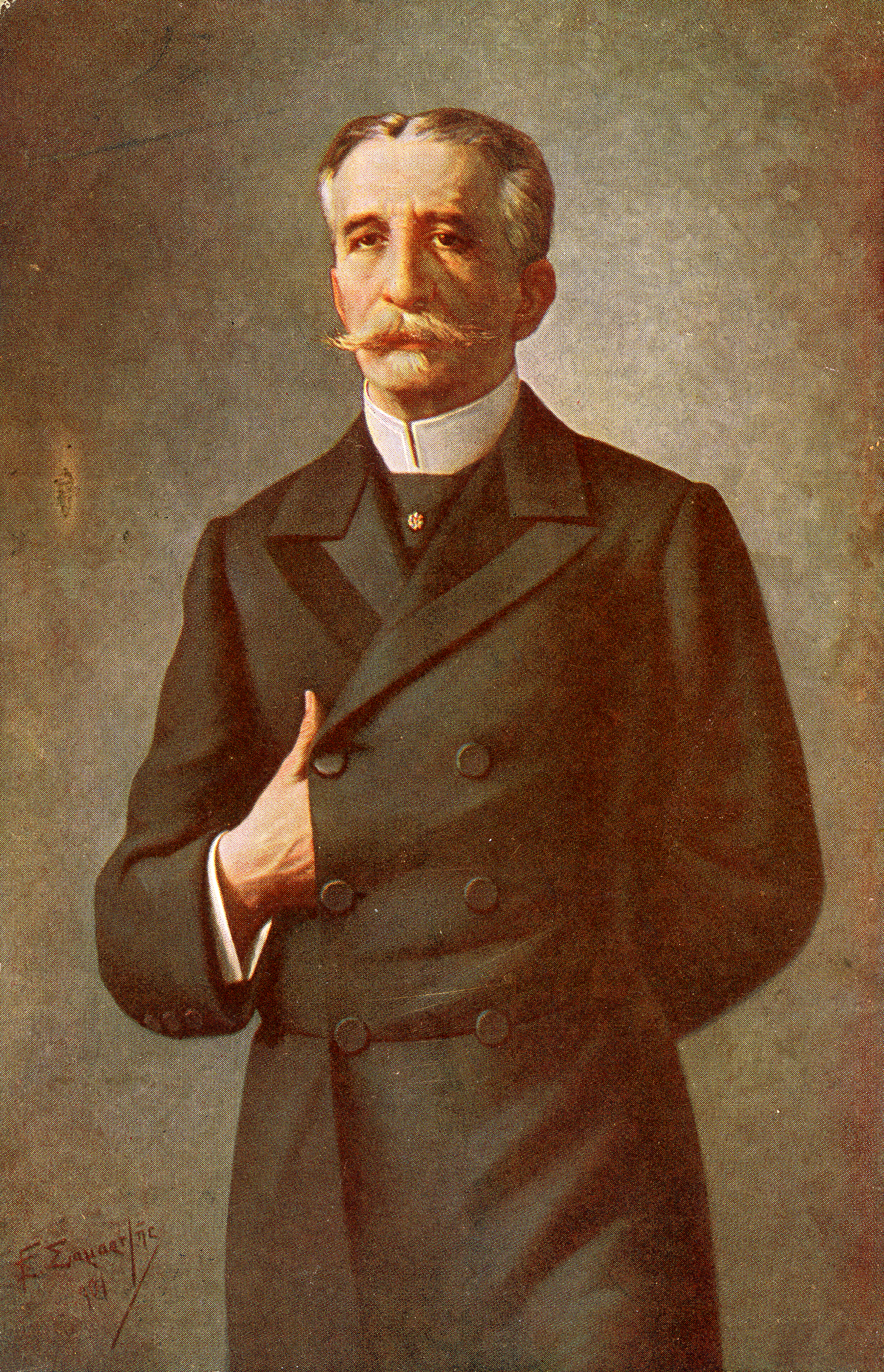

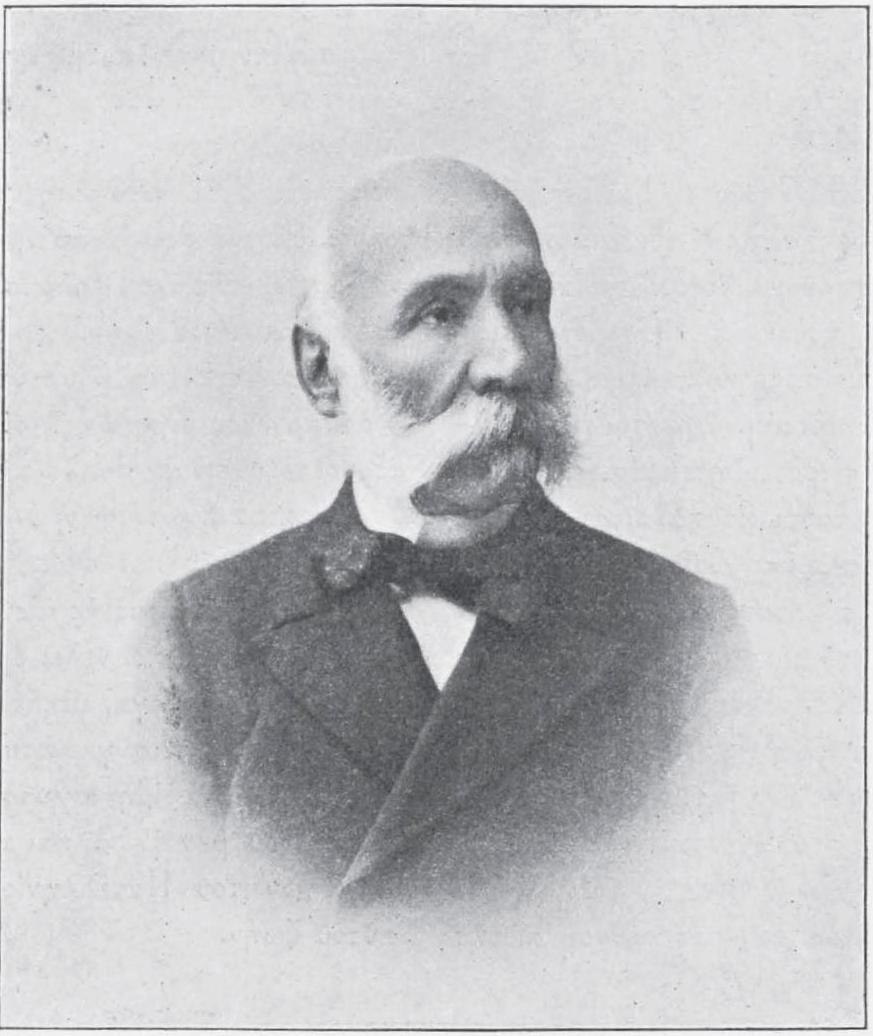

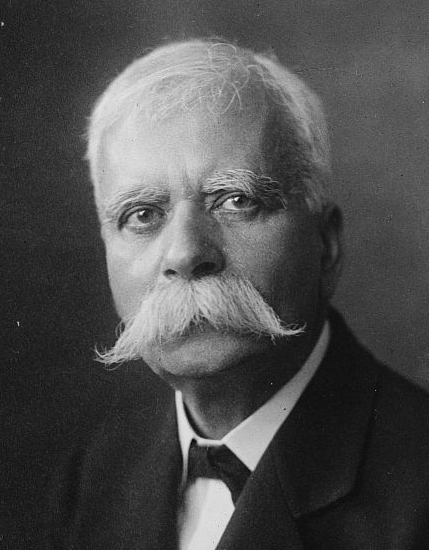
Leader	Georgios Theotokis	Theodoros Deligiannis	Alexandros Zaimis
Seats won	110	35	35
Prime Minister before election
Alexandros Zaimis
Nationalist
Prime Minister after election
Georgios Theotokis
New Party

Parliamentary elections were held in Greece on 7 February 1899. Although Charilaos Trikoupis died in 1896, his supporters emerged as the largest bloc in Parliament, with 110 of the 235 seats, Georgios Theotokis, his successor as a leader of the New Party became prime minister after the election.

== Results ==
Party	Seats
Supporters of Georgios Theotokis	110
Supporters of Alexandros Zaimis	35
Supporters of Theodoros Deligiannis	35
Supporters of Leonidas Deligiorgis	20
Supporters of Dimitrios Rallis	4–6
Supporters of Konstantinos Karapanos	3–6
Independents	23–28
Total	235
Source: Nohlen & Stöver
