= Stefanos Skouloudis =

Greek banker, politician and diplomat (1838–1928)

- Στέφανος Σκουλούδης
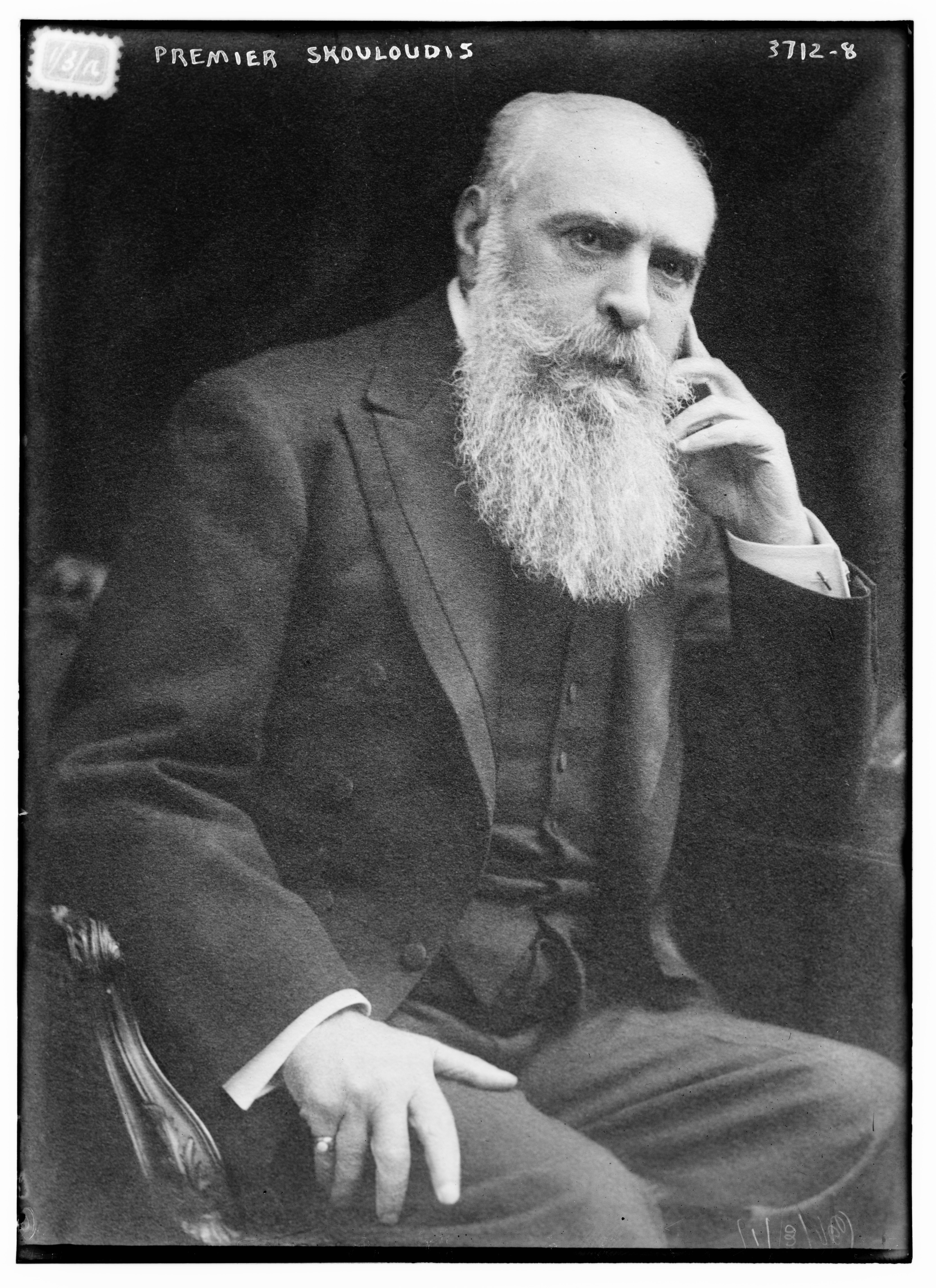
- Stefanos Skouloudis in January 1916 at the age of 78

Prime Minister of Greece
- In office 25 October 1915 – 9 June 1916
- Monarch: Constantine I
- Preceded by: Alexandros Zaimis
- Succeeded by: Alexandros Zaimis

Personal details
- Born: 23 November 1838 Constantinopole
- Died: 19 August 1928 (aged 89) Athens, Greece
- Occupation: politician, diplomat
- Profession: banker

Stefanos Skouloudis (Greek: Στέφανος Σκουλούδης; 23 November 1838 – 19 August 1928) was a Greek banker, diplomat and politician who served as the Prime Minister of Greece from 1915 to 1916.

== Early life ==
He was born in Istanbul on 23 November 1838. His parents, John and Zena Skouloudis, were originally from Crete and his father was a businessman in Constantinople, where Skouloudis completed grade school. In 1852, he was sent to Athens to attend high school, after which he completed medical school at the University of Athens. In 1859, Skouloudis joined the famed trading house of Ralli and became a manager of its import/export business, advancing, by 1863, to head of Turkish operations. In 1871, along with Andreas Syngros, Skouloudis founded the Bank of Constantinople. Skouloudis occasionally assisted the Greek government with diplomatic matters with the Ottoman Empire. He earned great wealth, and by 1876, Skouloudis moved permanently to Athens.

== Diplomatic and political life ==
In Athens, Skouloudis became active politically, and the crisis of 1877 provided him an opportunity to serve the government. As the "Eastern Crisis" developed into the Russo-Turkish War of 1877-78, Skouloudis was a secret emissary to the Albanian population outside Greece's borders. He also served as a representative of the city of Ioannina in talks leading to the Congress of Berlin which readjusted the border between Greece and the Ottoman Empire after that war.

Besides his diplomatic efforts, Skouloudis also involved himself in other public service. He was appointed to the Board of Governors of the Bank of Greece in 1880. In 1882, he formed the first company to drain Lake Copais, a lake that abutted very productive farmland north of Thebes, and which sometimes flooded.

First elected to the Hellenic Parliament in the election of 1881, representing Syros (and later Thebes), Skouloudis was a member of Trikoupis' liberal New Party. In 1882, he was appointed Greek Ambassador to Spain where he served until 1886. After Bulgaria's unilateral unification with Eastern Rumelia from the Ottoman Empire, Skouloudis represented the Greek government at peace talks in Constantinople in 1886.

He was again elected to parliament representing Thebes in 1892 and was appointed by Prime Minister Trikoupis as Minister of Religion and Education and later as Minister for the Navy. He also was called upon by both the liberal Trikoupis and conservative Theodoros Deligiannis governments to represent Greece in seeking loans and loan extensions from wealthier governments.

Skouloudis served on the Organizing Committee for the 1896 Summer Olympics. He noticed that costs for the Games were rising beyond the original estimates given by Pierre de Coubertin and gave a report to the president of the committee, Crown Prince Constantine, recommending that Greece withdraw from hosting the Games.

Skouloudis, and a number of others who agreed with him, resigned the committee at that point. However, Constantine decided to allow the Games to continue and the first modern Olympics were widely considered to be highly successful, especially in comparison to the 1900 and 1904 Summer Olympics.

Because of his extensive diplomatic service, the liberal Skouloudis was appointed Minister for Foreign Affairs in the conservative government of Dimitrios Rallis in 1897. In this position, he found himself overseeing Greece's diplomatic response to its first military defeat in the Greco-Turkish War of 1897, which despite the fairly complete defeat of Greece's army, resulted in a relatively small loss of Greek territory, partly because of Skouloudis' diplomatic efforts.

In 1905, Skouloudis was again elected to parliament from Thebes, but he did not serve in the government. After the Goudi Revolt in 1909, Skouloudis' name was heard often as a potential reformer Prime Minister, along with Stefanos Dragoumis, who was ultimately selected as Prime Minister and who paved the way for Eleftherios Venizelos to assume the premiership in 1910 and end the political crisis. Skouloudis was later tapped by Venizelos to be Greece's representative at peace talks in London after the First Balkan War in 1912.

== National Schism and prime ministry ==
Following the death of King George I in 1913, Greece's Prime Minister Venizelos and new king Constantine were increasingly at odds. As Europe descended into the First World War, the pro-German king and the pro-Allied Prime Minister struggled politically over Greece's entry into the war with the king supporting neutrality and Venizelos favoring entry on the side of the Allies. Venizelos resigned and was succeeded by Alexandros Zaimis. In October 1915 Venizelos left Athens and would later set up a rival government in Thessaloniki and Prime Minister Zaimis resigned. At that point, the king asked Skouloudis to form a government of national unity, including representatives of all the parties in parliament in his government. The Skouloudis government focused almost exclusively on the question of Greece's entry into World War I, and attempts to stave off the formation of a rival government in the north. Skouloudis was unsuccessful and Prime Minister Zaimis was reappointed by the king.

Eventually, with the abdication of Constantine in summer 1917 and the return of Venizelos triumphant to Athens, Skouloudis found himself investigated for collaboration with the former king, such as the reasons for the surrender of Fort Roupel in 1916 to Central Powers. It was decided, due to his age, to not be exiled, such others, but to be placed under custody.

He was charged and convicted along with his cabinet and remained in prison until November 1920. With the electoral defeat of Venizelos, Skouloudis' sentence was commuted in 1921 and he was pardoned. Skouloudis died in Athens on 19 August 1928.

== Sources ==
- Gennadios Library

Political offices
Preceded by Alexandros Zaimis	Prime Minister of Greece; 25 October 1915 – 9 June 1916	Succeeded by Alexandros Zaimis
