= 1890 Greek parliamentary election =

- 14 October 1890

All 150 seats in the Hellenic Parliament 76 seats needed for a majority
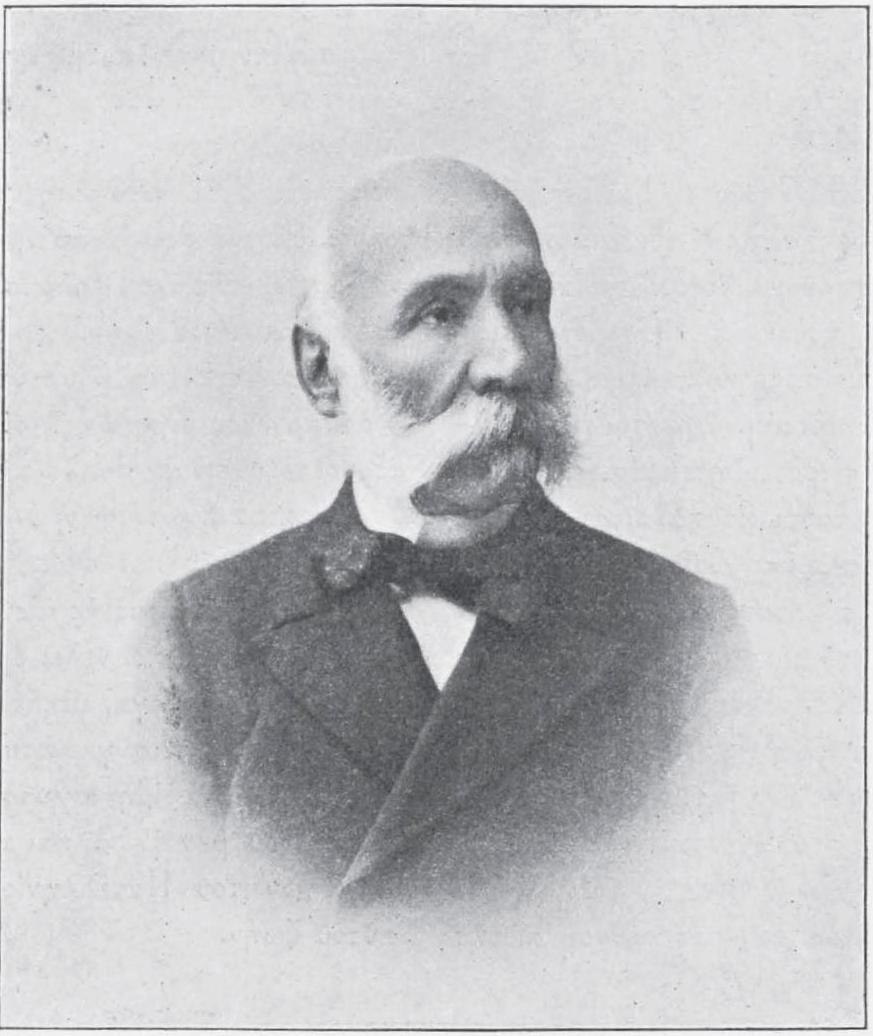

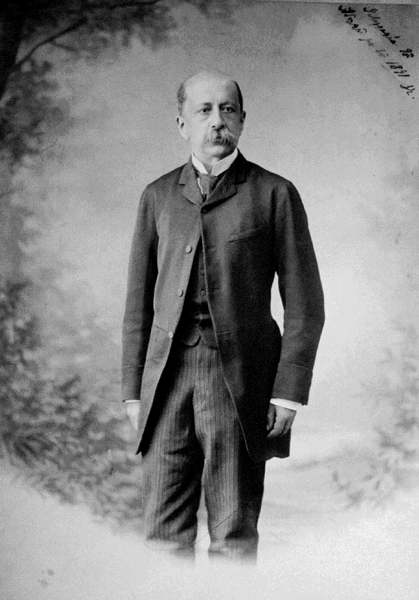
	First party	Second party
Leader	Theodoros Deligiannis	Charilaos Trikoupis
Party	Nationalist	New Party
Leader since	1882	1873
Last election	60 seats	90 seats
Seats won	100	15
Seat change	▲40	▼75
Prime Minister before election
Charilaos Trikoupis
New Party
Prime Minister after election
Theodoros Deligiannis
Nationalist

Parliamentary elections were held in Greece on 14 October 1890. Supporters of Theodoros Deligiannis emerged as the largest bloc in Parliament, with 100 of the 150 seats. Deligiannis became Prime Minister for the second time on 5 November.

== Results ==
Party	Seats
Supporters of Theodoros Deligiannis	100
Supporters of Charilaos Trikoupis	15
Independents	35
Total	150
Source: Nohlen & Stöver
