= 1902 Greek parliamentary election =

- 17 November 1902

All 235 seats in the Hellenic Parliament 118 seats needed for a majority
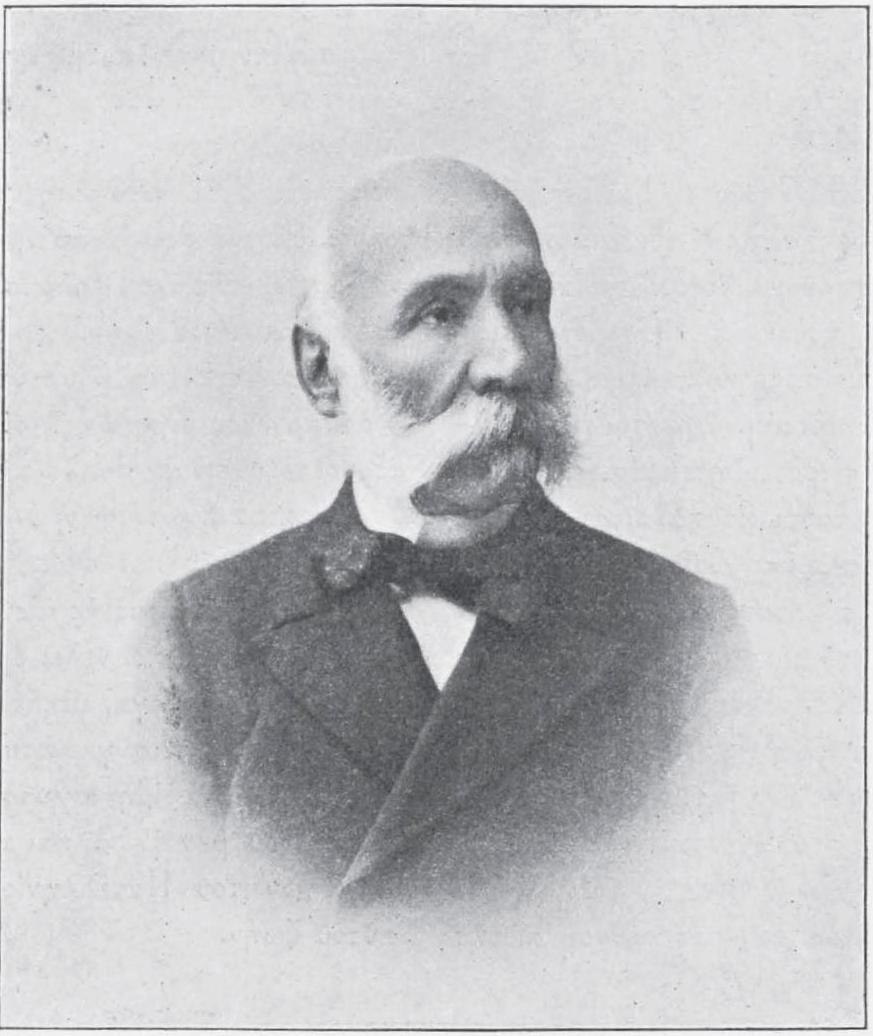

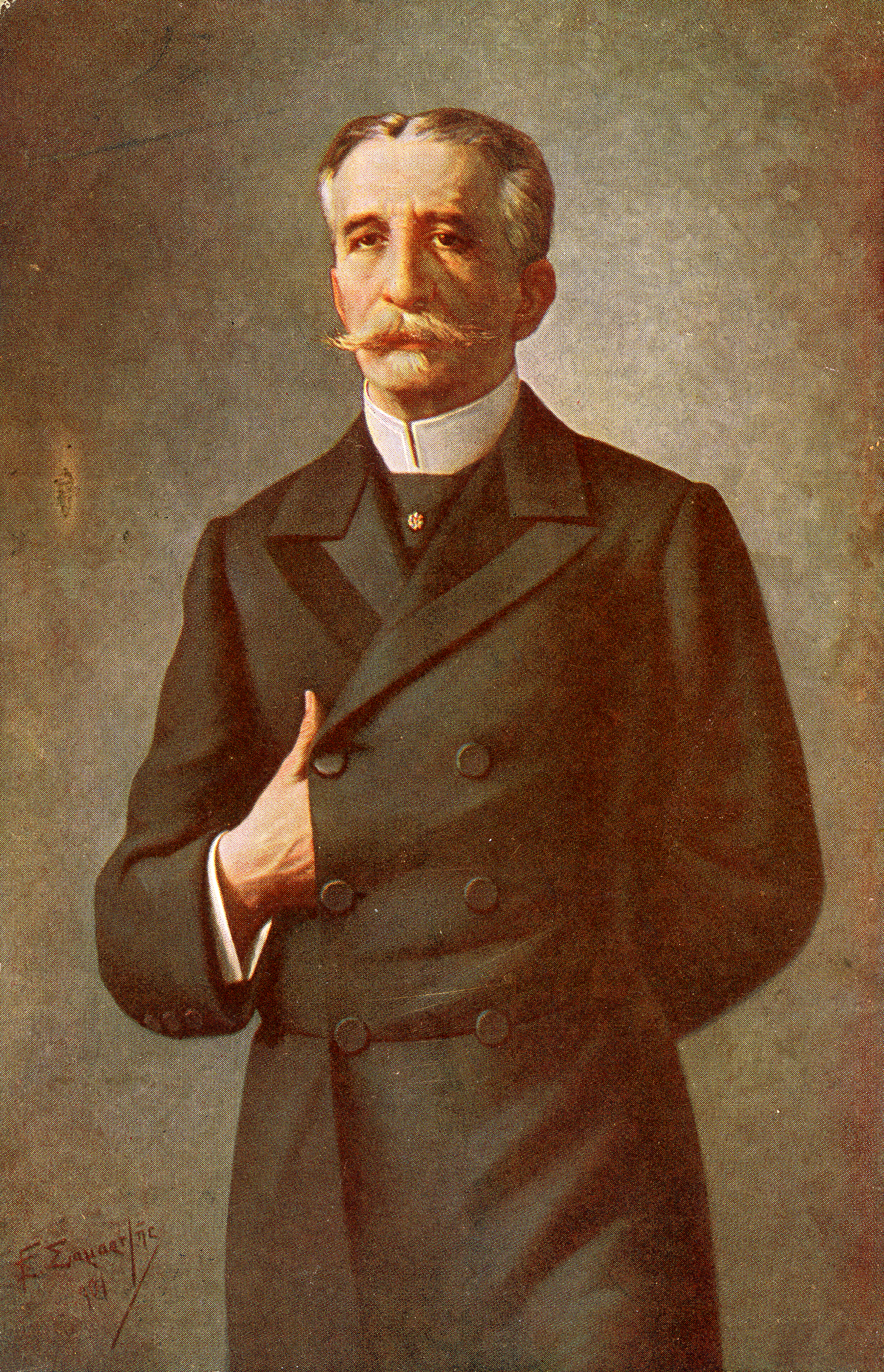

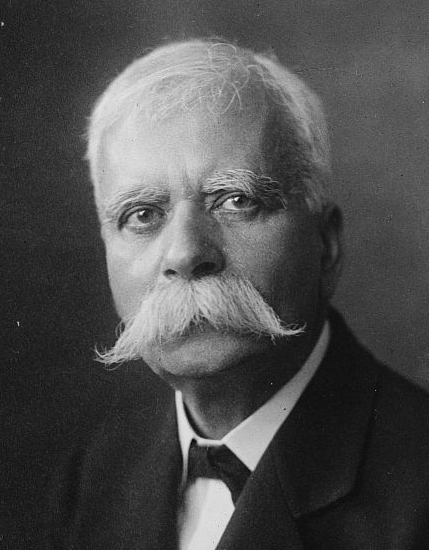

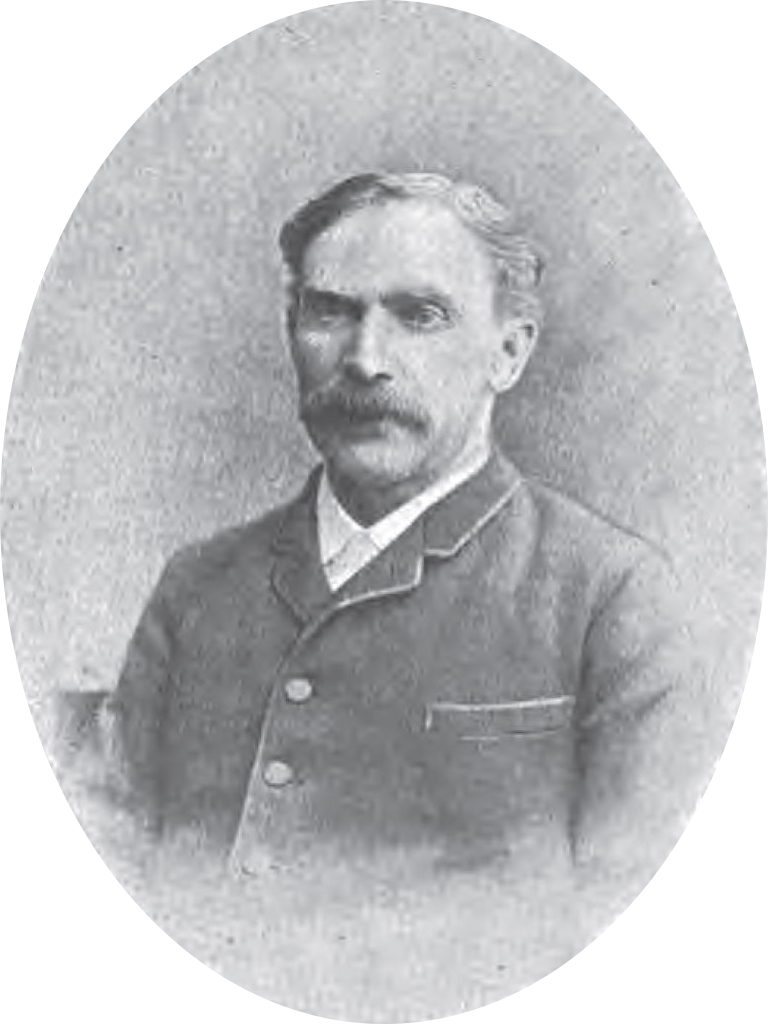
Leader	Theodoros Deligiannis	Georgios Theotokis	Alexandros Zaimis
Seats won	102	102	19
Leader	Dimitrios Rallis
Seats won	11
Prime Minister before election
Alexandros Zaimis
Prime Minister after election
Theodoros Deligiannis

Parliamentary elections were held in Greece on 17 November 1902. Supporters of Theodoros Deligiannis emerged as the largest bloc in Parliament, with 110 of the 235 seats. Deligiannis became Prime Minister for the fourth time on 6 December.

== Results ==
Party	Seats
Supporters of Theodoros Deligiannis	102
Supporters of Georgios Theotokis	102
Supporters of Alexandros Zaimis	19
Supporters of Dimitrios Rallis	11
Total	234
Source: Nohlen & Stöver
