= 1879 Greek parliamentary election =

- 23 September 1879

All 207 seats in the Hellenic Parliament 104 seats needed for a majority
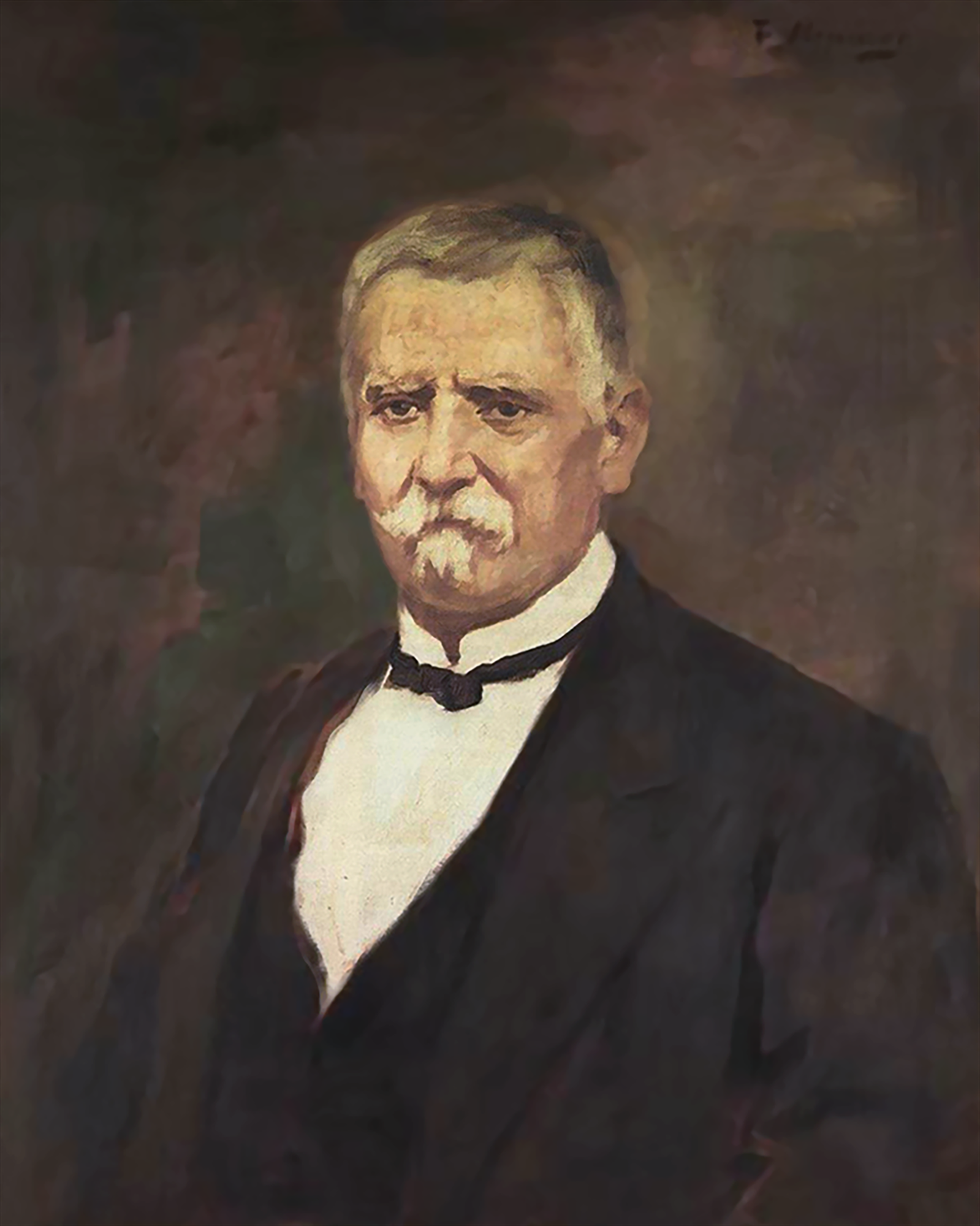

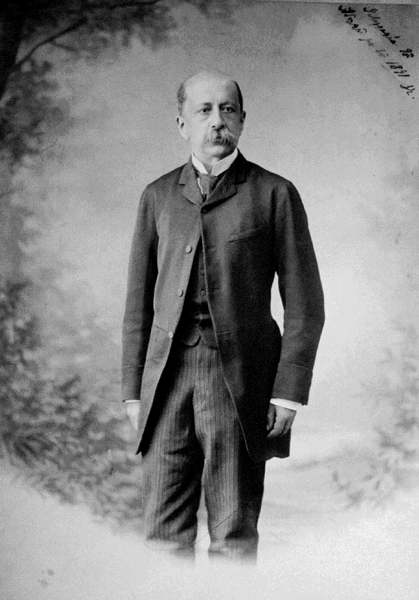

	First party	Second party	Third party
Leader	Alexandros Koumoundouros	Charilaos Trikoupis	Leonídas Deligeórgis
Party	Nationalist	New Party	EK
Leader since	1865	1873	1879
Seats won	100	85	20
Prime Minister before election
Alexandros Koumoundouros
Nationalist
Prime Minister after election
Alexandros Koumoundouros
Nationalist

Parliamentary elections were held in Greece on 23 September 1879. Supporters of Alexandros Koumoundouros and Theodoros Deligiannis emerged as the largest bloc in Parliament, with 100 of the 207 seats. Koumoundouros remained Prime Minister until 22 March the following year.

== Results ==
Party	Seats
Supporters of Koumoundouros and Deligiannis	100
United Opposition	85
Independent	20
Independents	2
Total	207
Source: Nohlen & Stöver
