= 1885 Greek parliamentary election =

- 7 April 1885

All 245 seats in the Hellenic Parliament 123 seats needed for a majority
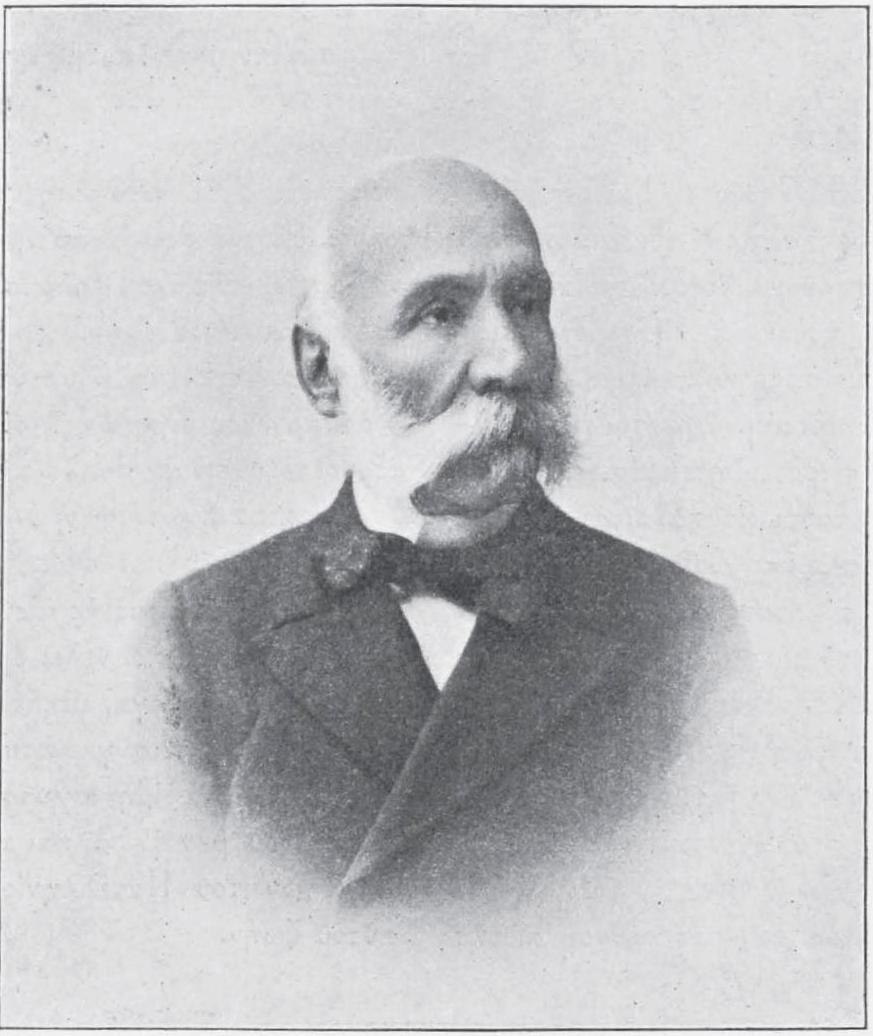

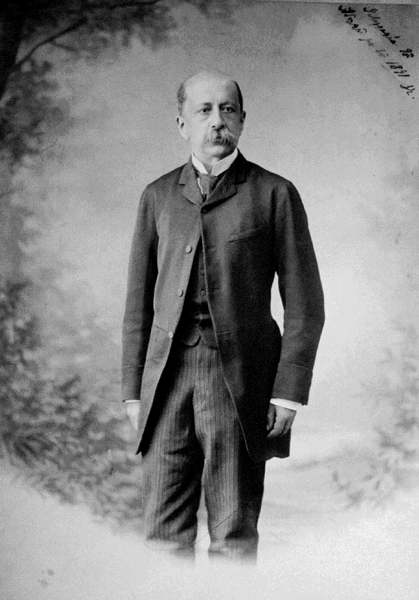
	First party	Second party
Leader	Theodoros Deligiannis	Charilaos Trikoupis
Party	Nationalist	New Party
Leader since	1882	1873
Seats won	170	40
Prime Minister before election
Charilaos Trikoupis
New Party
Prime Minister after election
Theodoros Deligiannis
Nationalist

Parliamentary elections were held in Greece on 7 April 1885. Supporters of Theodoros Deligiannis emerged as the largest bloc in Parliament, with 170 of the 245 seats. Deligiannis became Prime Minister on 1 May.

== Results ==
Party	Seats
Supporters of Theodoros Deligiannis	170
Supporters of Charilaos Trikoupis	40
Democrats	5
Independents	30
Total	245
Source: Nohlen & Stöver
