= 1905 Greek parliamentary election =

- 20 February 1905

All 235 seats in the Hellenic Parliament 118 seats needed for a majority
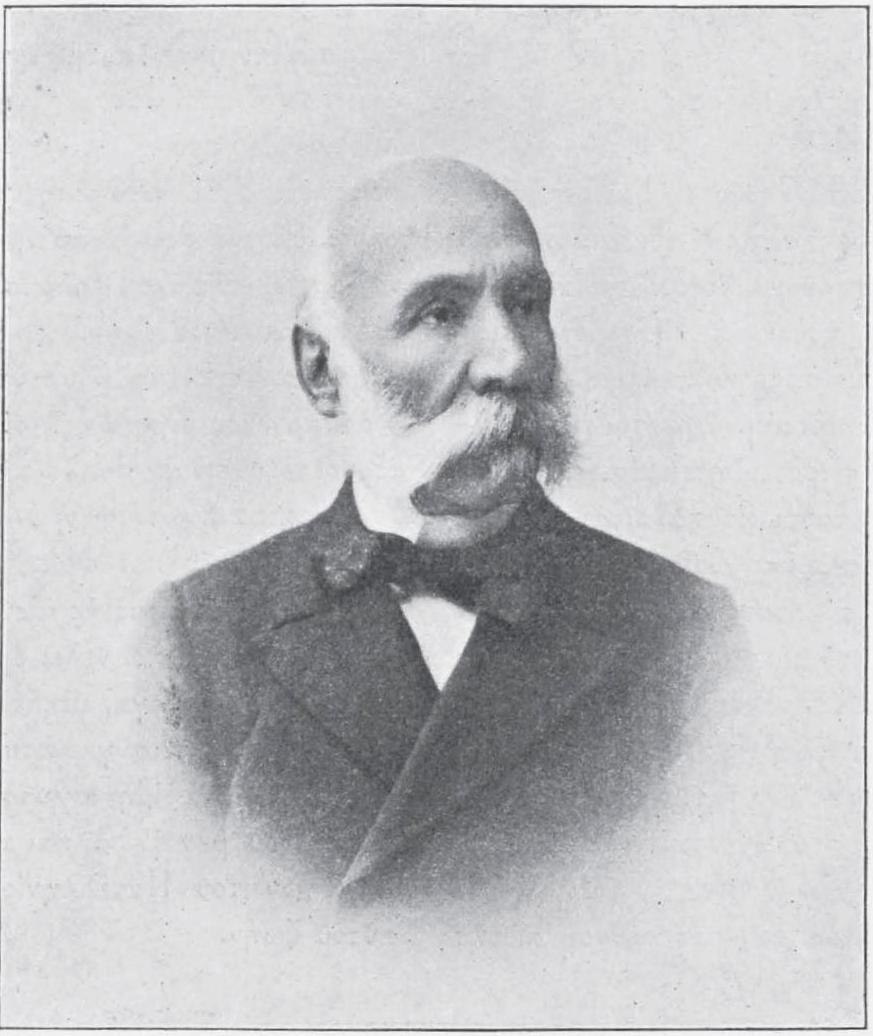

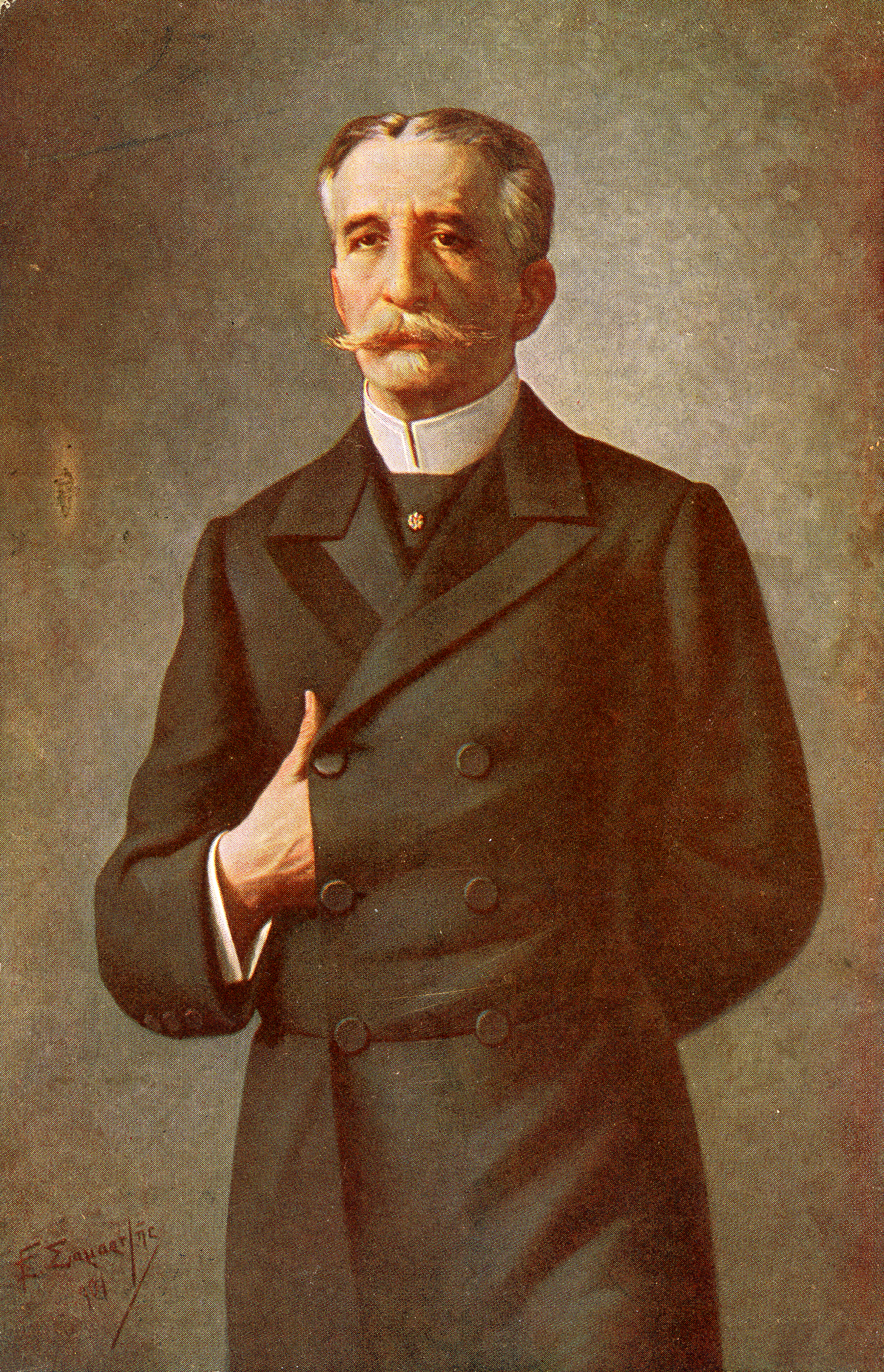

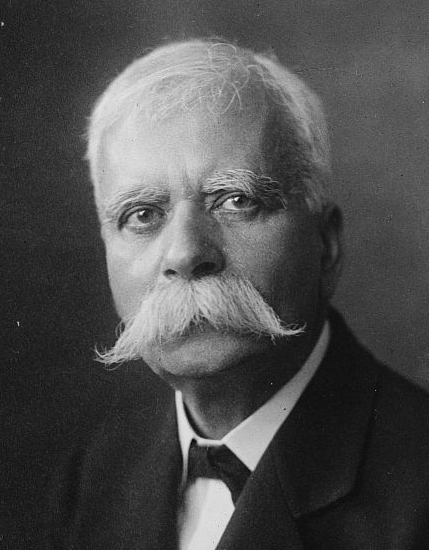
Leader	Theodoros Deligiannis	Georgios Theotokis	Alexandros Zaimis
Seats won	144	53	18
Prime Minister before election
Theodoros Deligiannis
Nationalist
Prime Minister after election
Theodoros Deligiannis
Nationalist

Parliamentary elections were held in Greece on 20 February 1905. Supporters of Theodoros Deligiannis emerged as the largest bloc in Parliament, with 144 of the 235 seats.

Deligiannis remained Prime Minister after the election, but he was assassinated on 13 June and was succeeded by Dimitrios Rallis.

== Results ==
Party	Seats
Supporters of Theodoros Deligiannis	144
Supporters of Georgios Theotokis	53
Supporters of Alexandros Zaimis	18
Independents	20
Total	235
Source: Nohlen & Stöver
