= 1892 Greek parliamentary election =

- 3 May 1892

All 207 seats in the Hellenic Parliament 104 seats needed for a majority
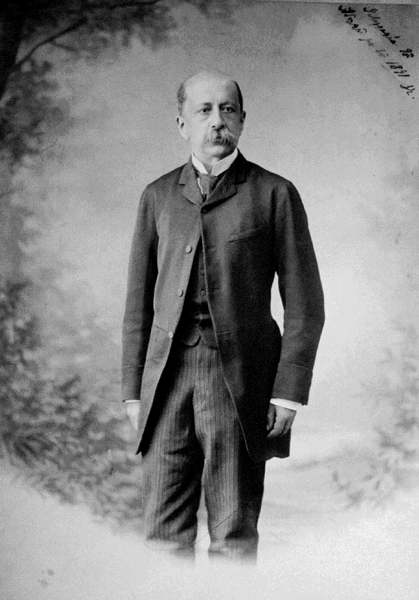

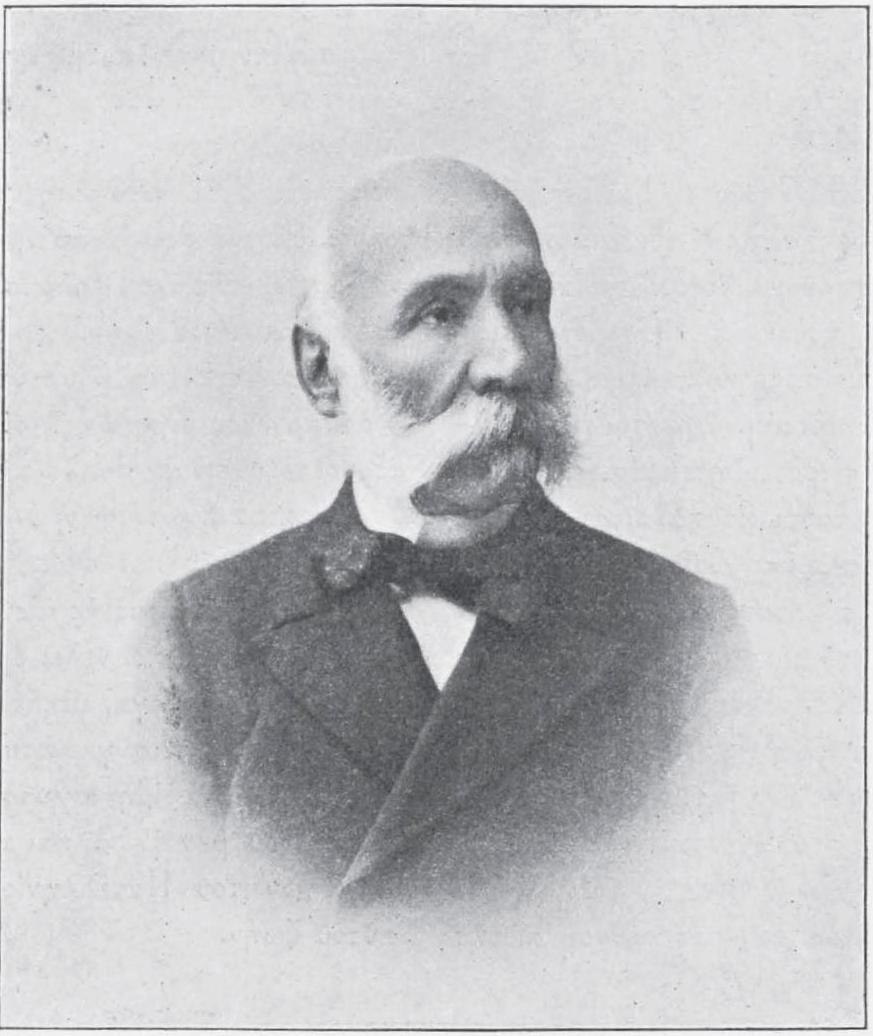
	First party	Second party
Leader	Charilaos Trikoupis	Theodoros Deligiannis
Party	New Party	Nationalist
Leader since	1873	1882
Seats won	160	47
Prime Minister before election
Konstantinos Konstantopoulos
Nationalist
Prime Minister after election
Charilaos Trikoupis
New Party

Parliamentary elections were held in Greece on 3 May 1892. Supporters of Charilaos Trikoupis emerged as the largest bloc in Parliament, with 160 of the 207 seats. Trikoupis became Prime Minister for the sixth time on 22 June.

== Results ==
Party	Seats
Supporters of Charilaos Trikoupis	160
United Opposition	47
Total	207
Source: Nohlen & Stöver
