= 1895 Greek parliamentary election =

- 16 April 1895

All 207 seats in the Hellenic Parliament 104 seats needed for a majority
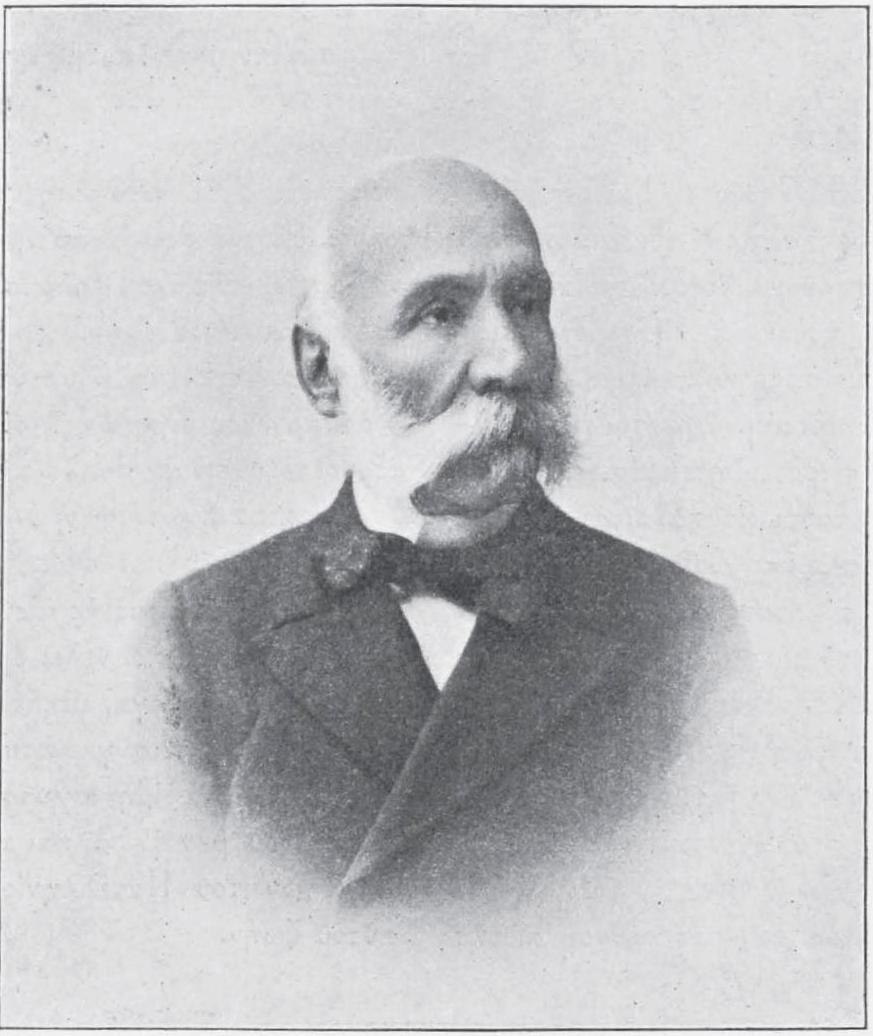

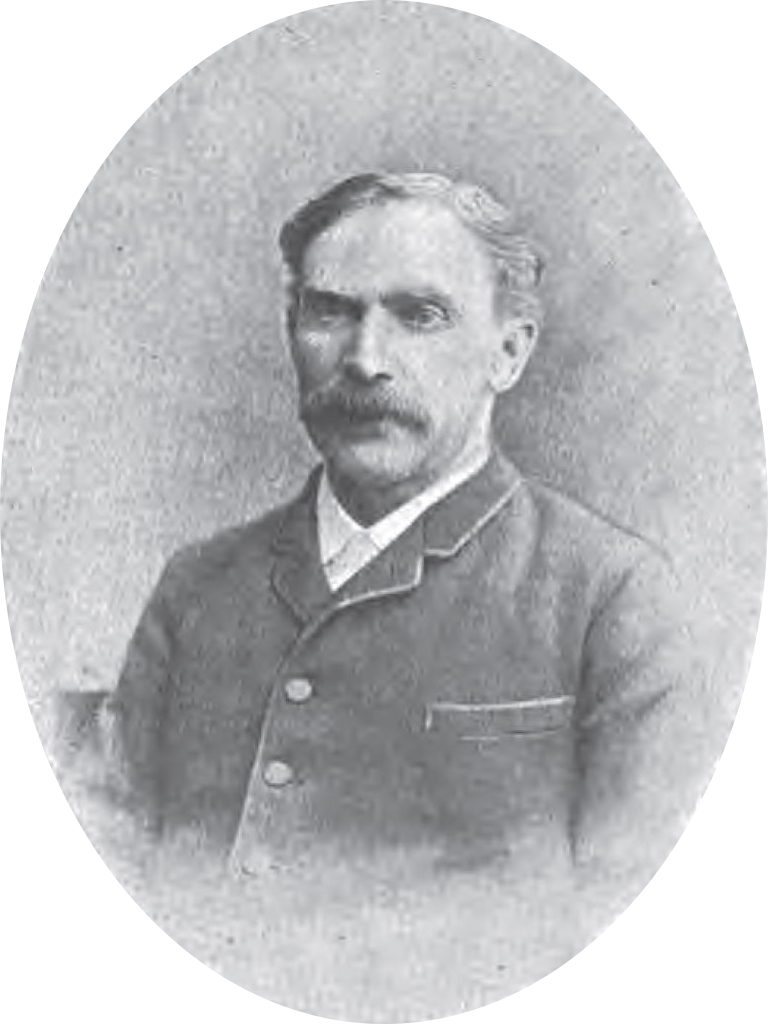

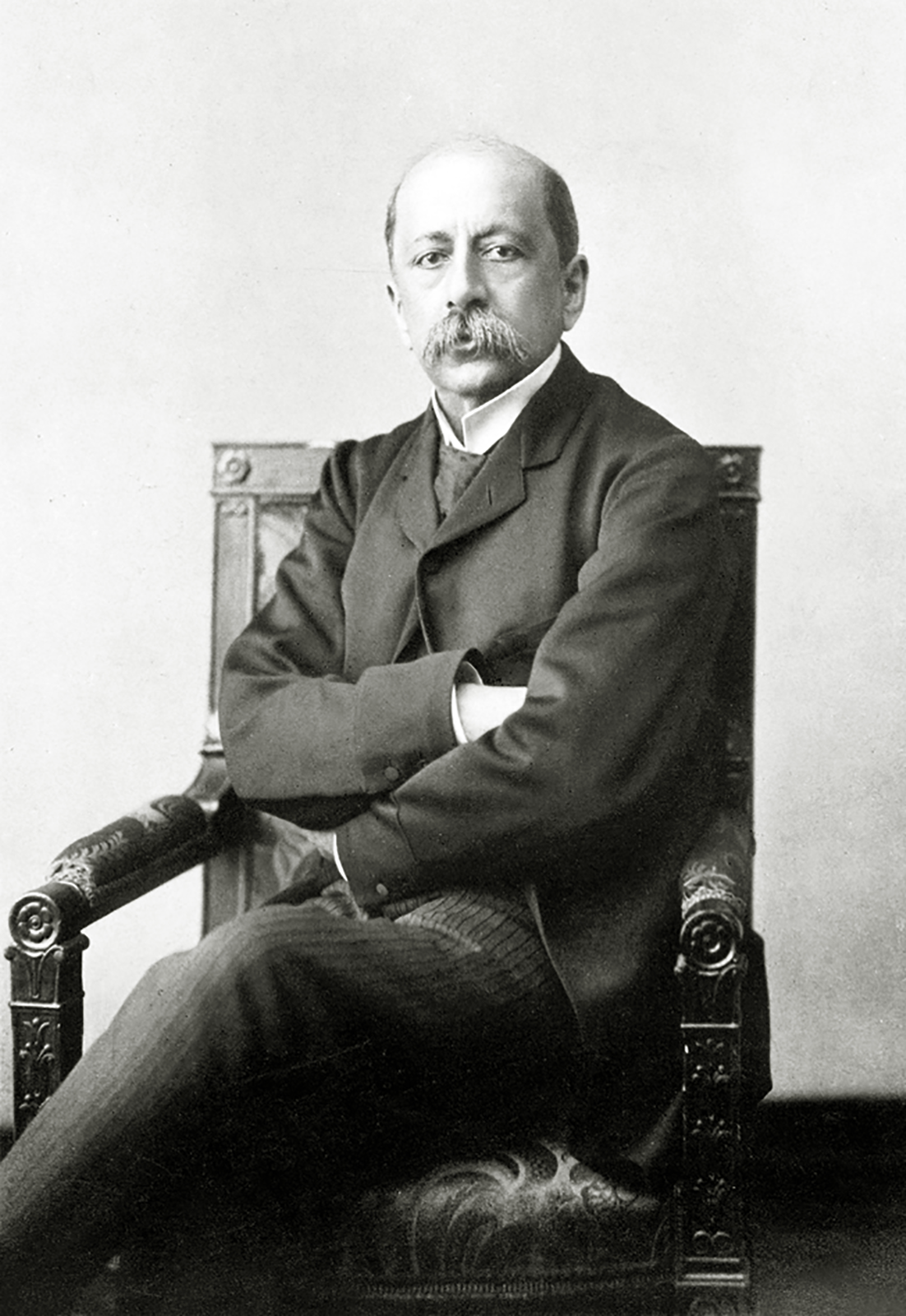
Leader	Theodoros Deligiannis	Dimitrios Rallis	Charilaos Trikoupis
Seats won	150	20	20
Prime Minister before election
Nikolaos Deligiannis
(Caretaker)
Independent
Prime Minister after election
Theodoros Deligiannis
Nationalist

Parliamentary elections were held in Greece on 16 April 1895. Supporters of Theodoros Deligiannis emerged as the largest bloc in Parliament, with 150 of the 207 seats. Deligiannis became Prime Minister for the third time on 11 June 1895.

== Results ==
Party	Seats
Supporters of Theodoros Deligiannis	150
Supporters of Dimitrios Rallis	20
Supporters of Charilaos Trikoupis	20
Supporters of Leonidas Deligiorgis	6
Supporters of Konstantinos Karapanos	4
Independents	7
Total	207
Source: Nohlen & Stöver
