= Koumoundouros =

Koumoundouros is a surname. Notable people with the surname include:

- Alexandros Koumoundouros
- Olga Koumoundouros
- Konstantinos Koumoundouros
