= Konstantinos Konstantopoulos =

Greek politician

- Κωνσταντίνος Κωνσταντόπουλος
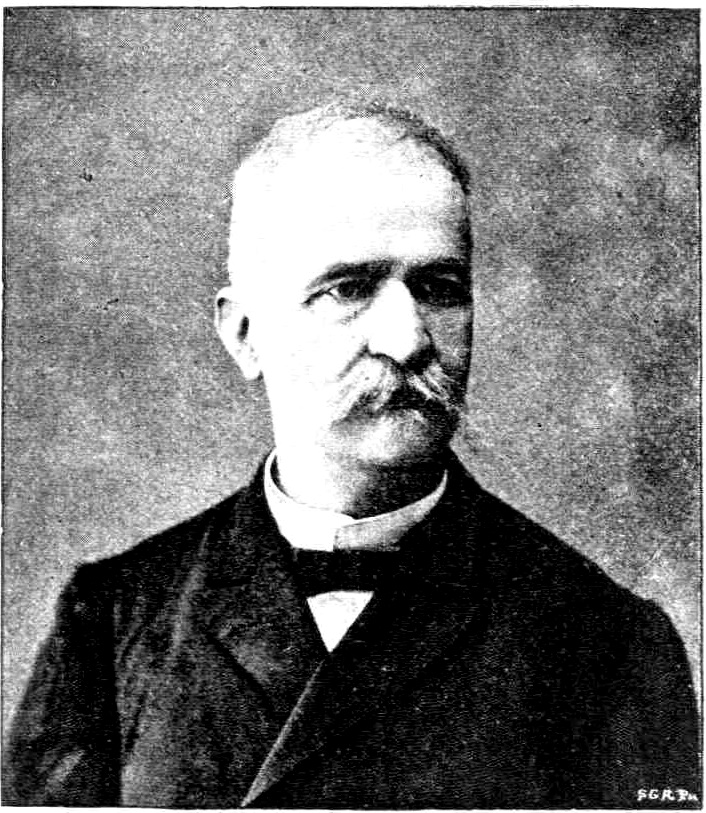
- Konstantinos Konstantopoulos, Prime Minister of the Kingdom of Greece

Prime Minister of Greece
- In office 10 February 1892 – 10 June 1892
- Monarch: George I
- Preceded by: Theodoros Deligiannis
- Succeeded by: Charilaos Trikoupis

Personal details
- Born: 14 November 1832 Tripoli, Greece
- Died: 11 November 1910 (aged 77) Athens, Greece
- Party: National Party

Konstantinos Konstantopoulos (Greek: Κωνσταντίνος Κωνσταντόπουλος; 14 November 1832, Tripoli, Greece – 11 November 1910, Athens) was a conservative Greek politician and briefly Prime Minister of Greece.

== Early political career ==
During the reign of King Otto, Konstantopoulos was a Mayor of Patras and later leader of the Prefectures of Achaia and Elis. He was successful in averting bloodshed in a feud in that area.

== Parliament and Prime Minister ==
Konstantopoulos was eventually elected as a member of the National Party to the parliament representing Mantineia, a town in northern Arcadia. By 1890, Konstantopoulos was elected President of the Parliament. In 1892, the Prime Minister, Theodoros Deligiannis was asked to resign by the king over continuing disagreements between the Prime Minister and the Crown over economic policy, despite the fact that the Prime Minister maintained the confidence of the Parliament. The king, in dismissing the Prime Minister called for new elections and asked Konstantopoulos, a fellow member of Deligiannis' National Party, to form a government on February 18, 1892. Konstantopoulos led his party in the May 3 election, but Charilaos Trikoupis' New Party won the election. On June 10, 1892, Konstantopoulos was replaced by Trikoupis.

He remained active in politics and a member of parliament until 1904. Konstantopoulos died in Athens in November 1910.

== Sources ==
- Historical Information (in Greek)

Political offices
Preceded by Theodoros Deligiannis	Prime Minister of Greece; 10 February - 10 June 1892	Succeeded by Charilaos Trikoupis
