= Dimitrios Valvis =

Greek politician and judge

- Δημήτριος Βάλβης
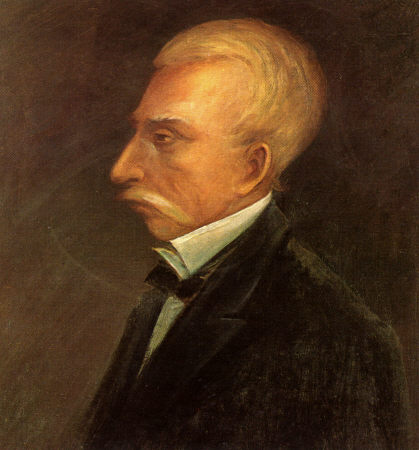

Prime Minister of Greece
- In office 9 May 1886 – 21 May 1886
- Monarch: George I
- Preceded by: Theodoros Deligiannis
- Succeeded by: Charilaos Trikoupis

President of the Court of Cassation
- In office 1872–1885
- Preceded by: Aris Moraitnis
- Succeeded by: Nikolaos Deligiannis

Personal details
- Born: 1814 Messolonghi, Greece
- Died: 30 November 1892 (aged 77–78) Athens, Greece
- Relations: Zinovios Valvis

Dimitrios Valvis (Greek: Δημήτριος Βάλβης; 1808 or 1814 – 30 November 1892) was a Greek politician and judge, who served briefly as Prime Minister of Greece in May 1886.

== Early life and education ==
Valvis was born in Messolonghi and studied law in Pisa, Italy.

== Career ==
Valvis served as President of the Court of Cassation from 1872 to 1885. He was appointed as a care-taker Prime Minister for a brief period in May 1886 between the ministries of Theodoros Deligiannis and Charilaos Trikoupis.

== Personal life ==
He was the brother of Zinovios Valvis, who also served as Prime Minister of Greece on two occasions, in 1863 and 1864.

Political offices
Preceded by Theodoros Deligiannis	Prime Minister of Greece; 9 May 1886 – 21 May 1886	Succeeded by Charilaos Trikoupis
