= Nikolaos Deligiannis =

Greek politician (1845–1910)

- Νικόλαος Δηλιγιάννης
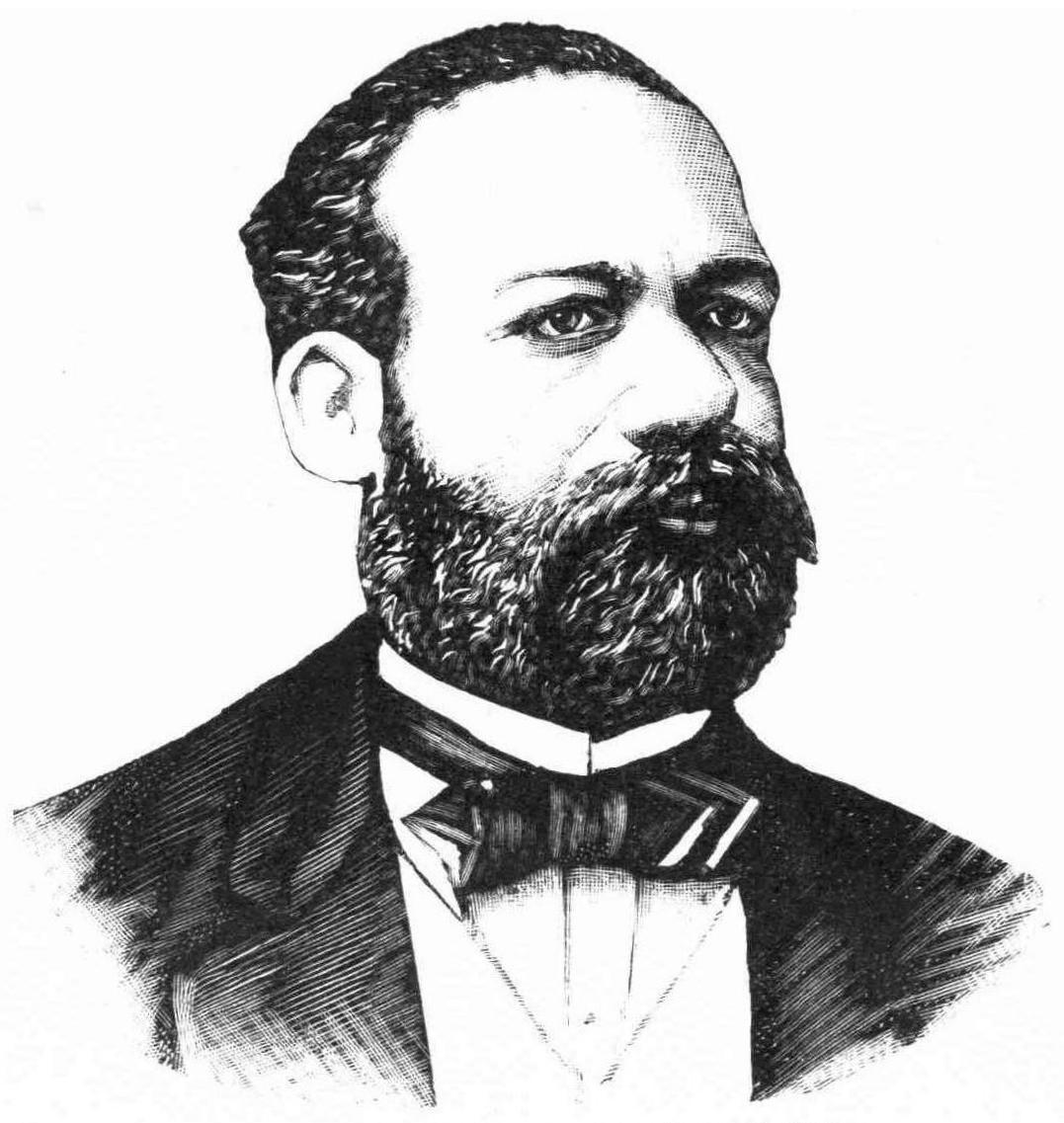

Prime Minister of Greece
- In office 12 January 1895 – 31 May 1895
- Monarch: George I
- Preceded by: Charilaos Trikoupis
- Succeeded by: Theodoros Deligiannis

Personal details
- Born: 12 January 1845 Athens, Greece
- Died: 5 January 1910 (aged 64) Paris, France
- Spouse: Amalia Baltatzi
- Children: Three
- Occupation: Diplomat, Politician

Nikolaos Petrou Deligiannis (Greek: Νικόλαος Πέτρου Δηλιγιάννης; 1845– 5 January 1910) was the caretaker Prime Minister of Greece from January to May 1895. A member of the Deligiannis political family, he embarked on a diplomatic career and served in ambassadorial posts in the Ottoman Empire, Serbia, France, and Spain. Due to his distinguished career Deligiannis was appointed in 1895 by King George I to head a caretaker cabinet formed to conduct the elections held later that year. After a new government took office following the elections, Deligiannis returned to diplomatic service in Paris, later representing Greece at the Hague Convention in 1899.

== Biography ==
Born in Athens, he is the son of Petros Deligiannis, three-time foreign minister of Greece (1841, 1849 & 1863) and spawn of the powerful primate from Langadia, Arcadia.

He studied law at the University of Athens and made his career in the diplomatic corps. He was first appointed secretary of the Greek embassy in Constantinople and then served as ambassador in Belgrade (1881–1885), Paris (1885–1893) and in Madrid. He returned to Athens and after a while he left for Paris again, where he was appointed Ambassador of Greece. In 1899 he was a representative of Greece in the Hague Convention. He was also a founding member of the Hellenic Olympic Committee.

In January 1895, after the fall of the seventh and last cabinet of Charilaos Trikoupis, he was appointed by George I as caretaker Prime Minister. The Deligiannis government, composed of extra-parliamentary figures, in which he also held the Foreign and Interior portfolios, conducted elections which took place in May of the same year. They were won by Theodoros Deligiannis, a first cousin of his father, who accessed as Prime Minister on 31 May 1895. Nikolaos Deligiannis returned to the diplomatic service as ambassador in Paris, where he died and was buried in the cemetery of Boulogne-sur-Mer.

== Family ==
His wife was Amalia Baltatzi, sister of N. Baltatzi, lady-in-waiting, and Elena (Elisa) Baltatzi, wife of Alexandros Tombazis, ambassador in Belgrade. They had three children. Their daughter and a son, officer in the Hellenic Army, had already died when Nikolaos Deligiannis died. The third child, Petros Deligiannis, was also a diplomat, secretary of the embassy in Washington, and Consul at the embassy in Paris in 1890.

He is not to be confused with his cousin Nikolaos Deligiannis (1831–1890), son of Panagos and brother of Prime Minister Theodoros Deligiannis, who served as President of the Court of Cassation (Areopagus) in 1885–1890.

Political offices
| Preceded by Charilaos Trikoupis | Prime Minister of Greece; 12 January - 31 May 1895 | Succeeded by Theodoros Deligiannis |
