= Georgios Theotokis =

Greek politician

- Γεώργιος Θεοτόκης
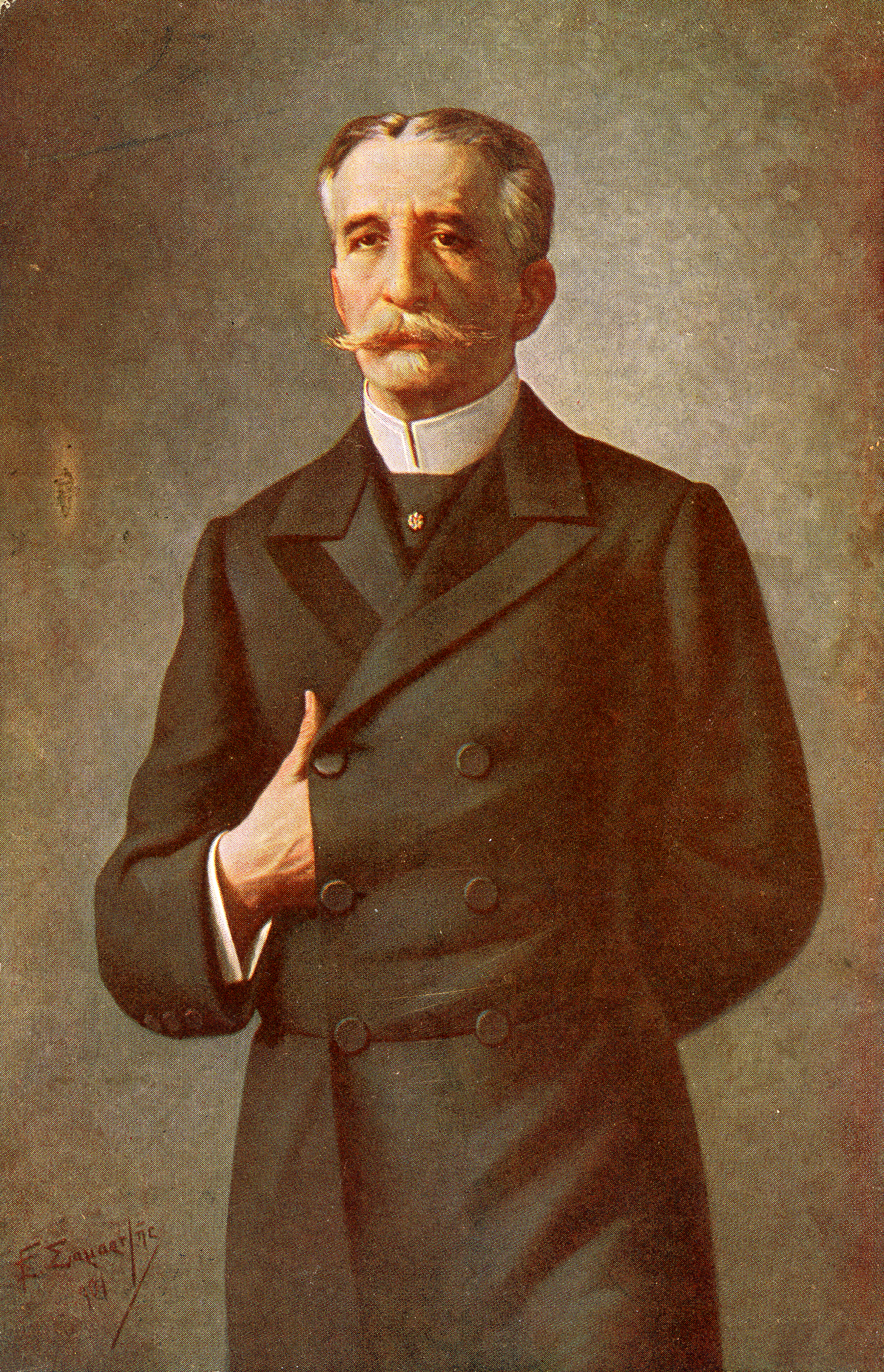
- Theotokis circa 1910

Prime Minister of Greece
- In office 8 December 1905 – 7 July 1909
- Monarch: George I
- Preceded by: Dimitrios Rallis
- Succeeded by: Dimitrios Rallis
- In office 6 December 1903 – 17 December 1904
- Monarch: George I
- Preceded by: Dimitrios Rallis
- Succeeded by: Theodoros Deligiannis
- In office 14 June 1903 – 28 June 1903
- Monarch: George I
- Preceded by: Theodoros Deligiannis
- Succeeded by: Dimitrios Rallis
- In office 2 April 1899 – 12 November 1901
- Monarch: George I
- Preceded by: Alexandros Zaimis
- Succeeded by: Alexandros Zaimis

Personal details
- Born: 8 February 1844 Corfu, United States of the Ionian Islands
- Died: 13 January 1916 (aged 71) Athens, Greece
- Party: Modernist Party
- Spouse: Amalia Theotokis
- Children: Nikolaos Theotokis; Ioannis Theotokis; Zaera Theotokis

Georgios Theotokis (Greek: Γεώργιος Θεοτόκης; 8 February 1844 – 12 January 1916) was a Greek politician and Prime Minister of Greece, serving the post four times. He represented the Modernist Party or Neoteristikon Komma (NK).

== Biography ==
He was the third child of Corfiote Nikolaos Andreas Theotokis. After graduating from the Ionian High School, he enrolled at the Law School of the Ionian University. In 1861 he received his law degree from the Ionian University with a scholarship and continued his studies at the Sorbonne in Paris.

Upon his return to Corfu, he worked as a lawyer. In 1879 he took part in the municipal elections and was elected mayor with a percentage of 65%. In 1883 he was re-elected mayor only to leave in 1885 at the invitation of Charilaos Trikoupis, to become a member of the Hellenic Parliament for the Trikoupis party.

In May 1886 Trikoupis appointed him Minister for Naval Affairs. As a minister Theotokis ordered the battleships Spetsai, Hydra and Psara. He also improved drastically the condition of the Navy by promoting better training and establishing many naval academies and schools. Later Trikoupis appointed him Minister of Ecclesiastical Affairs and Public Education. With the aid of professor Papamarkos, Theotokis prepared and submitted to Parliament progressive legislation for the improvement of education in Greece. However, the legislation was never passed due to the opposition of Theodoros Deligiannis.

From mid-1903 to 1909 Theotokis became three more times Prime Minister of Greece, the third time being the longest at the prime minister's post. Among his achievements are the organisation and strengthening of the army, including the adoption of modern khaki uniforms. He provided assistance for the Macedonian Struggle and is noted for his calm and deliberate foreign policy in the tense period just prior to the Balkan Wars (1912–1913).

His grandson Georgios Rallis, who also became prime minister, has criticized him for two, in his opinion, important mistakes. Namely because in the days leading to the disastrous Greco-Turkish War of 1897, Theotokis did not oppose sending the Hellenic Army to Crete, that led to the outbreak of the war. The second mistake was Theotokis's refusal to mediate between King Constantine I of Greece and Prime Minister Eleftherios Venizelos during 1915–1916, a disagreement that eventually grew to become the National Schism.

Georgios Theotokis, however, is considered by many to be a politician distinguished for his high ethics, calm demeanor and controlled temper, qualities not often found among politicians of his era.

As a mayor of Corfu, Georgios Theotokis approved construction for the Municipal Theatre of Corfu in 1885.

== Sources ==
- Georgios Rallis: "Georgios Theotokis: Politician of the measured response" (In Greek), Ελληνική Ευρωεκδοτική, Αθήνα 1986, 355 p. ISBN 960-241-017-5.

Political offices
Preceded by Alexandros Zaimis	Prime Minister of Greece; 1899–1901	Succeeded by Alexandros Zaimis
Preceded by Theodoros Deligiannis	Prime Minister of Greece; 1903	Succeeded by Dimitrios Rallis
Preceded by Dimitrios Rallis	Prime Minister of Greece; 1903–1904	Succeeded by Theodoros Deligiannis
Preceded by Dimitrios Rallis	Prime Minister of Greece; 1905–1909	Succeeded by Dimitrios Rallis
