= Alexandros Zaimis =

Prime Minister of Greece (1855–1936)

- Αλέξανδρος Ζαΐμης
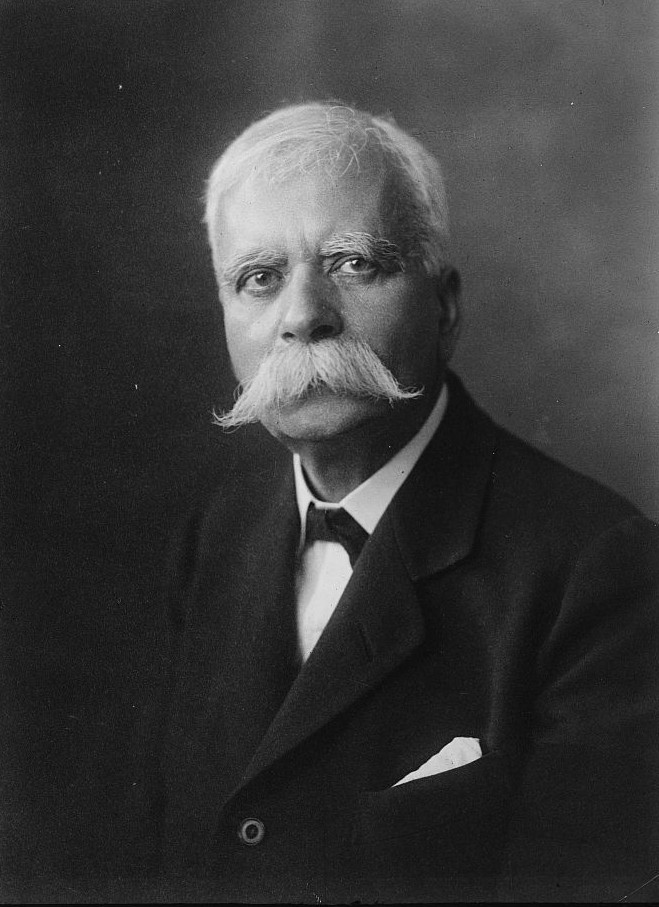

President of Greece
- In office 10 December 1929 – 10 October 1935
- Prime Minister: Eleftherios Venizelos; Alexandros Papanastasiou; Panagis Tsaldaris; Alexandros Othonaios
- Preceded by: Pavlos Kountouriotis
- Succeeded by: Georgios Kondylis (as Regent)

Prime Minister of Greece
- In office 4 December 1926 – 4 July 1928
- President: Pavlos Kountouriotis
- Preceded by: Georgios Kondylis
- Succeeded by: Eleftherios Venizelos
- In office 21 April 1917 – 14 June 1917
- Monarchs: Constantine I Alexander
- Preceded by: Spyridon Lambros
- Succeeded by: Eleftherios Venizelos
- In office 9 June 1916 – 3 September 1916
- Monarch: Constantine I
- Preceded by: Stefanos Skouloudis
- Succeeded by: Nikolaos Kalogeropoulos
- In office 24 September 1915 – 25 October 1915
- Monarch: Constantine I
- Preceded by: Eleftherios Venizelos
- Succeeded by: Stefanos Skouloudis
- In office 12 November 1901 – 18 November 1902
- Monarch: George I
- Preceded by: Georgios Theotokis
- Succeeded by: Theodoros Deligiannis
- In office 21 September 1897 – 2 April 1899
- Monarch: George I
- Preceded by: Dimitrios Rallis
- Succeeded by: Georgios Theotokis

High Commissioner of Crete
- In office 18 September 1906 – 24 September 1908
- Monarch: George I
- Preceded by: Prince George of Greece
- Succeeded by: (Unification with Greece unilaterally declared)

Personal details
- Born: 28 October 1855 Athens, Kingdom of Greece
- Died: 15 September 1936 (aged 80) Vienna, Federal State of Austria
- Party: National Party (1887–1902); Neohellenic Party (1902–1924); Independent (1924–1935)
- Occupation: Politician

Alexandros Zaimis (Greek: Αλέξανδρος Ζαΐμης, romanized: Aléxandros Zaḯmis; 28 October 1855 – 15 September 1936) was a Greek politician who served as Greece's Prime Minister, Minister of the Interior, Minister of Justice, and High Commissioner of Crete. He served as prime minister six times. Although he was a leader of the monarchist faction, Zaimis was the third and last President of the Second Hellenic Republic.

== Early life and family ==
Zaimis was born in Athens, a son of Thrasyvoulos Zaimis, a former Prime Minister of Greece, and Eleni Mourouzi. His brother was Asimakis Zaimis.

On his father's side he was the grandson of Andreas Zaimis, another former prime minister of Greece, and related to the great Kalavrytan family with notable participation in the Greek War of Independence from 1821. From his mother's side he was a descendant of an important Fanariote family of the Mourozidon. His family lived in Kerpini, Kalavryta in the Achaia prefecture.

He studied law at the University of Athens and at the University of Heidelberg. He also attended the universities of Leipzig, Paris and Berlin.

== Political career ==
Alexandros became involved in politics after the death of his father who was the elected member of parliament for Kalavryta. He became a Member of Parliament in 1885. He served as Minister of the Interior and Justice Minister in Theodoros Deligiannis's government (1890–1892) and Speaker of the Hellenic Parliament (1895–1897). He became prime minister for the first time in 1897.

=== Appointment as High Commissioner ===
In 1906, he was appointed as High Commissioner of Crete and presided over a critical period of the island's history up to the de facto union of Crete with Greece in 1908.

=== Re-election as Prime Minister ===
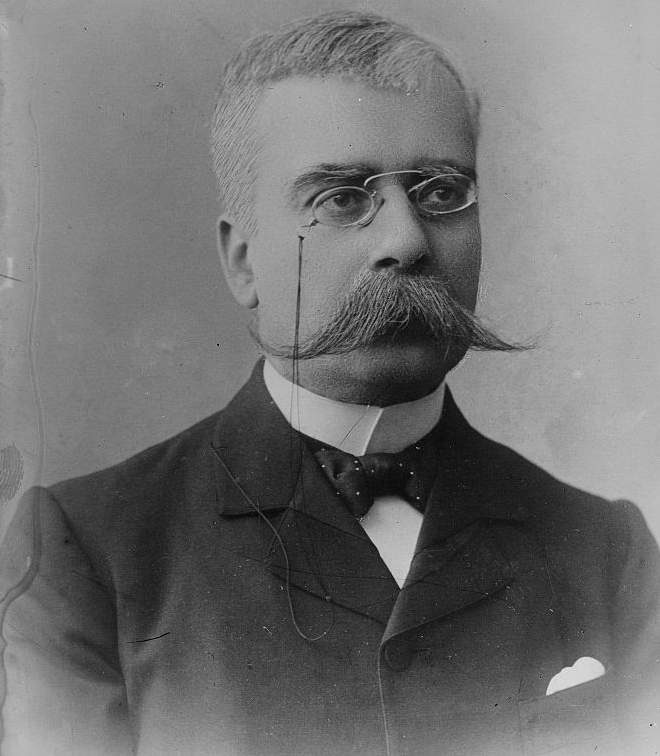
Zaimis between c. 1910 and 1915

Alexandros Zaimis was re-elected as prime minister a further five times. He was appointed prime minister under King Constantine I to succeed Venizelos in October 1915, but resigned a month later when his government failed to receive a vote of confidence. In 1917, Zaimis served again as prime minister under King Constantine I, while Eleftherios Venizelos led a rival government controlling northern Greece. Under Entente pressure, he resigned in favor of Venizelos in June of the same year. During World War I, he was generally supposed to favour neutrality for Greece, but to be personally in favor of the Allies.

A moderate conservative, he served again as prime minister in the Second Hellenic Republic, from 1926 to 1928, in a coalition government of Venizelist and moderate conservatives.

Zaimis was elected the third and last President of the Second Hellenic Republic in 1929. He was reelected in 1934. However, only one year into his second term, he was thrown out of office by Georgios Kondylis, who abolished the Republic and proclaimed himself regent pending the results of a referendum on restoring the monarchy. This referendum resulted in George II being recalled to the throne by almost 98% of the vote, a high total that was obtained because no-monarchist supported the abstension to vote for protest (there was no secrecy of vote).

== Death and legacy ==
He died on 15 September 1936 in Vienna, Austria and was buried in the First Cemetery of Athens. He was married without children. The political legacy of his family was continued by his siblings and cousins.

== Sources ==
- Svolopoulos, Konstantinos (1988). "Η Περίοδος της Αυτονομίας ("The Period of Autonomy")". In Panagiotakis, Nikolaos M. (ed.). Crete, History and Civilization (in Greek). Vol. II. Vikelea Library, Association of Regional Associations of Regional Municipalities. pp. 459–492.
- Rines, George Edwin, ed. (1920). "Zaimis, Alexander" . Encyclopedia Americana.

Political offices
Preceded by Dimitrios Rallis	Prime Minister of Greece; 21 September 1897 - 2 April 1899	Succeeded by Georgios Theotokis
Preceded by Georgios Theotokis	Prime Minister of Greece; 12 November 1901 - 18 November 1902	Succeeded by Theodoros Deligiannis
Preceded by Prince George of Greece	High Commissioner of Crete; 18 September 1906 – 24 September 1908	Succeeded by (Unification with Greece); Antonios Michelidakis^{1}
Preceded by Eleftherios Venizelos	Prime Minister of Greece; 24 September - 25 October 1915	Succeeded by Stephanos Skouloudis
Preceded by Stephanos Skouloudis	Prime Minister of Greece; 9 June - 3 September 1916	Succeeded by Nikolaos Kalogeropoulos
Preceded by Spyridon Lambros	Prime Minister of Greece; 21 April - 21 June 1917	Succeeded by Eleftherios Venizelos
Preceded by Georgios Kondilis	Prime Minister of Greece; 4 December 1926 – 4 July 1928	Succeeded by Eleftherios Venizelos
Preceded by Pavlos Kountouriotis	President of Greece; 1929–1935	Succeeded by Georgios Kondylis (as Regent)
Notes and references
1. Kitromilides, Paschalis (2006). Eleftherios Venizelos: The Trials of Statesmanship, p 88, ISBN 0-7486-2478-3
