= New Party (Greece, 1873) =

New Party Νεωτεριστικόν Κόμμα
- Founder: Charilaos Trikoupis
- Founded: 1873; 153 years ago
- Dissolved: 1910; 116 years ago
- Preceded by: English Party; French Party
- Succeeded by: Liberal Party
- Ideology: Modernization; Liberalism (Greek); Greek nationalism

The New Party or the Modernist Party (Greek: Νεωτεριστικόν Κόμμα, Neoteristikon Komma) was a reformist Greek political party.

== Political background ==
During the First Hellenic Republic (1828–1832) and the reign of King Otto (1833–1863), the early Greek parties were essentially based on clientage of the Great Powers: the Russian Party, the English Party, and the French Party.

During the first years of the reign of King George I, the political life of the country did not differ considerably from the previous Othonian period. Moreover, the new Constitution of 1864 was directed toward the modernization of the political system. However, the crown's political interventions were undiminished, and "court governments" succeeded one another. The dissolution of the old political parties led to the creation of modern parties based on explicit and enduring parliamentary principles.

Until the 1870s, loose parties continued to prevail without principles or a political program, instead based they were organized around the personality of a more or less charismatic leader. This situation changed with the dynamic intervention of Charilaos Trikoupis, when he converted his Fifth Party into a new philosophically-based party. A supporter of the British two-party parliamentary system; in 1873, he created the New Party (Neoteristiko Komma) according to the model of western democracies.

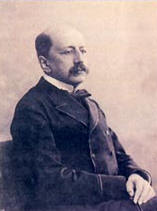
Charilaos Trikoupis, father of the New Party

After Trikoupis published his critical diatribe in the Athens daily Kairoi entitled "Who's to Blame" and clearly pointed the finger at royal favoritism in the selection of prime ministers, he was, after a brief time in prison, asked to form a government to lead the country into the 1875 general election. These were among the cleanest elections in Greek history, but the New Party was defeated by the Nationalist Party of Alexandros Koumoundouros.

== Philosophy of the party ==
The New Party was organized around the principles of modernization (defined as emulating Western European culture) of the political, social and economic life of the country. Specifically, the priority of the New Party was the development of the private economic sphere and the consequent restriction of state intervention in the economy.

This political program was supported by the emerging middle class in the Greek state, the business activities of the Greeks living abroad and the western European investors who sought new investment opportunities partially because of the great decline of the traditional European economies. Thus, the program of the New Party introduced systematically into the Greek state the new ideas and principles of British liberalism.

However, the program is not adequate enough to characterize it as a modern party. The absence of established governance procedures and organs within the party with responsibility for policy planning and decision-making rendered this party dependent on the leader like most historical political groupings throughout Greek history. Consequently, it might be more exact to characterize Neoteristiko as a "transitional" party since it made demands for the modernization of the parties rather than inaugurating new institutions and procedures by its actions.

== Electoral history ==
The Nationalist Party remained in power most of the time until March 15, 1882. During this time, he was able to push through an aggressive program of reforms. Trikoupis was a strong believer in the need to create an infrastructure to support the economy, and to attract foreign investment. A progressive program of road and railroad construction significantly improved internal communications. The most important of the works he campaigned for was the digging of the Corinth Canal.

In the 1885 general election, voters elected only 56 New Party deputies against 184 deputies for the Nationalist Party led by Theodoros Deligiannis. Despite the mandate, however, the Deligiannis government fell a year later and Trikoupis was again Prime Minister until 1890.

Trikoupis led New Party governments again from June 22, 1892 to May 15, 1893 in which Trikoupis stood before parliament and made the most famous statement of his career: "Regretfully, we are broke". This was due to massive overspending as Greece sought to modernize its military forces on land and sea and each government struggled to outdo the previous. The servicing of foreign loans was suspended, and all non-essential spending was cut.

The New Party was again in power from November 11, 1893 to January 24, 1895. It was during that time that the planning for the 1896 Summer Olympics was begun. Trikoupis was skeptical about the games and feared that the country could not burden the cost. He was convinced, eventually, to host them and made the needed arrangements. This would be his last term in office.

Trikoupis tried to make terms with the creditors of his nation, but he failed there too. The first taxation which he proposed aroused great hostility, and in January, 1895 he resigned. At the 1895 general election, four months later, he and his New Party were defeated and, within a year, the only leader the New Party had ever known was dead.

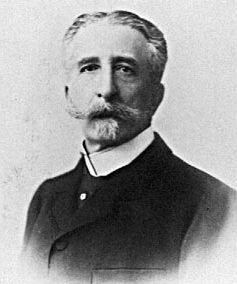
Georgios Theotokis, the second and final leader of the New Party

Corfiot Georgios Theotokis led the party and was prime minister from April 14, 1899 to November 25, 1901, from June 27, 1903 to July 11, 1903, and from December 19, 1903 to December 29, 1904, before winning the 1905 general election and serving as Prime Minister from December 21, 1905 – July 29, 1909.

Ousted by the military as a result of the Goudi Pronunciamento, Theotokis was the last leader of the New Party. With the arrival of Eleftherios Venizelos in Greece in 1910, most liberal supporters gravitated to the new Komma Fileleftheron.

== Leaders ==
- Charilaos Trikoupis (1873–1895)
- Georgios Theotokis (1898–1910)

== Sources ==
- Clogg, Richard; A Short History of Modern Greece; Cambridge University Press, 1979; ISBN 0-521-32837-3
- John A. Petropulos; Politics and Statecraft in the Kingdom of Greece; Princeton University Press, 1968
