= Dimitrios Rallis =

Greek politician (1844–1921)

- Δημήτριος Ράλλης
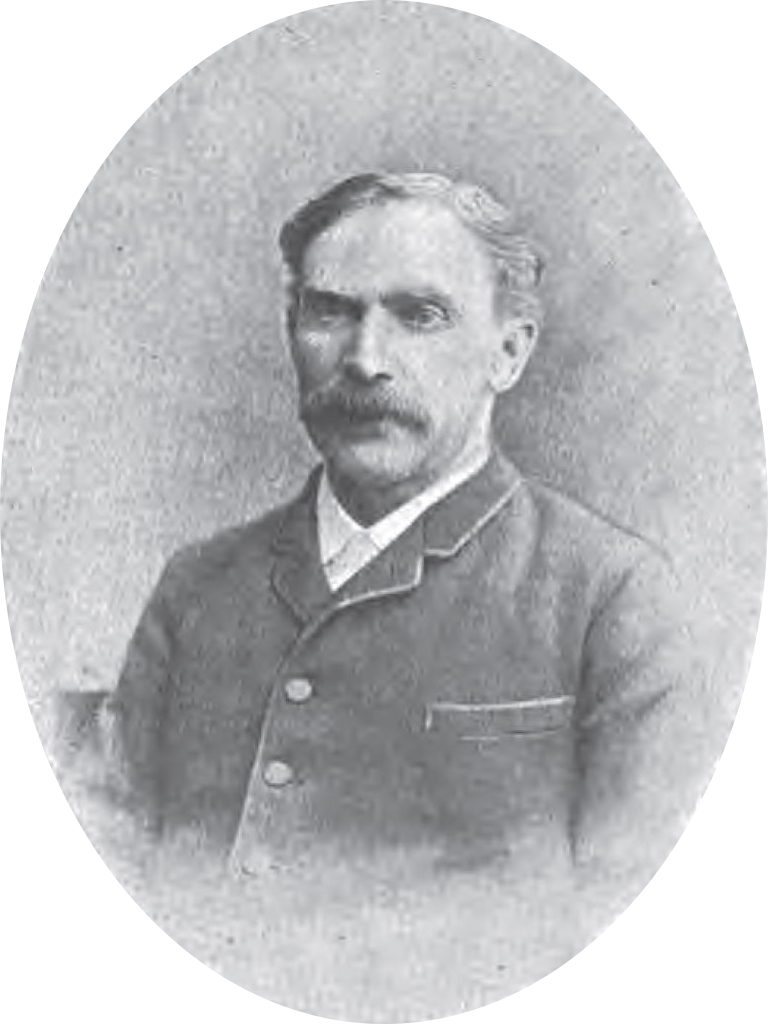

Prime Minister of Greece
- In office 4 November 1920 – 24 January 1921
- Monarch: Constantine I (from Dec 1920)
- Regent: Queen Mother Olga (until Dec 1920)
- Preceded by: Eleftherios Venizelos
- Succeeded by: Nikolaos Kalogeropoulos
- In office 7 July 1909 – 15 August 1909
- Monarch: George I
- Preceded by: Georgios Theotokis
- Succeeded by: Kyriakoulis Mavromichalis
- In office 9 June 1905 – 8 December 1905
- Monarch: George I
- Preceded by: Theodoros Deligiannis
- Succeeded by: Georgios Theotokis
- In office 28 June 1903 – 6 December 1903
- Monarch: George I
- Preceded by: Georgios Theotokis
- Succeeded by: Georgios Theotokis
- In office 18 April 1897 – 21 September 1897
- Monarch: George I
- Preceded by: Theodoros Deligiannis
- Succeeded by: Alexandros Zaimis

Personal details
- Born: 1844 Athens, Greece
- Died: 6 August 1921 (aged 76–77) Dionysos, Attika
- Resting place: First Cemetery of Athens
- Party: Neohellenic Party (1891 – c. 1910)
- Spouse: Loukia Mavrou-Ralli
- Children: Ioannis Rallis; Georgios D. Rallis
- Parent: Georgios A. Rallis (father)
- Education: National and Kapodistrian University of Athens
- Occupation: Politician
- Awards: Grand Cross of the Order of the Redeemer

Dimitrios Rallis (Greek: Δημήτριος Ράλλης; 1844^{a}–1921) was a Greek politician, founder and leader of the Neohellenic or "Third Party".

== Family ==
Rallis was born in Athens in 1844. He was descended from an old Greek political family. Before Greek independence, his grandfather, Alexander Rallis, was a prominent Phanariote. His father, Georgios A. Rallis, was a minister in Athanasios Miaoulis's government, and later served as the Chief Justice of the Greek Supreme Court.

== Political career ==
Rallis was elected to Parliament in 1872 and always represented the same Athenian constituency. He became Minister in several governments and served as Prime Minister five times. He last formed a government after the 1920 election and it was his cabinet that authorised the plebiscite that saw King Constantine's return to the throne.

== Death and legacy ==
Rallis died of cancer in Athens on 5 August 1921 at the age of 77. His son, Ioannis Rallis, was a collaborationist prime minister during the Axis occupation of Greece. His grandson, George Rallis, served as prime minister in the early 1980s.

== Notes ==
- ^a In the family tomb the date of birth is given as 14 April 1842.

Political offices
Preceded by Theodoros Deligiannis	Prime Minister of Greece; 18 April – 21 September 1897	Succeeded by Alexandros Zaimis
Preceded by Georgios Theotokis	Prime Minister of Greece; 28 June 1903 – 6 December 1903	Succeeded by Georgios Theotokis
Preceded by Theodoros Deligiannis	Prime Minister of Greece; 9 June – 8 December 1905	Succeeded by Georgios Theotokis
Preceded by Georgios Theotokis	Prime Minister of Greece; 7 July – 15 August 1909	Succeeded by Kyriakoulis Mavromichalis
Preceded by Eleftherios Venizelos	Prime Minister of Greece; 4 November 1920 – 24 January 1921	Succeeded by Nikolaos Kalogeropoulos
