= National Party (Greece) =

Defunct political party in Greece

National Party Εθνικόν Κόμμα
- Leader: Theodoros Deligiannis (1883–1905); Kyriakoulis Mavromichalis (1905–1916)
- Founded: circa 1883
- Dissolved: 1916
- Preceded by: Russian Party
- Succeeded by: People's Party
- Headquarters: Athens
- Ideology: Nationalism; Megali Idea; Conservatism; Monarchism (faction)
- Political position: Right-wing

The National Party (Greek: Εθνικόν Κόμμα, Ethnikon Komma;) or Deligiannis' Komma^{a} was a conservative Greek political party from 1883 to 1916 founded by Theodoros Deligiannis It was opposed primarily by the New Party of Charilaos Trikoupis.

== History ==
The National Party was formed after the previous major-power client political parties, the Russian Party, English Party and the French Party, ceased to be factors after the reign of King Otto in 1865. Upon the death of Alexandros Koumoundouros on 26 February 1883 - the leadership of his large parliamentary group passed to Theodoros Deligiannis. This parliamentary group evolved into a party, the so-called National Party. Theodoros Deligiannis, famously stated that he "was against everything Trikoupis was for". Throughout the 1880s and 1890s, Greece developed a stable two-party system with the premiership alternating between Deligiannis and Trikoupis. Since 1885, bipartisanship has been an integral part of the political life of the Greek electorate.

Deligiannis was assassinated in 1905 by a gambler who was outraged at Deligiannis's proposal to curtail gambling. In 1905, after the assassination of Theodore Deligiannis, Kyriakoulis Mavromichalis became the leader of the party. After his death in 1916, the party was dissolved.

== Notes ==
- ^a The Greek parties of the period were more like coalitions centred a political leader than parties in the present sense. This is why they are most often referred to by the name of their leaders, e.g. Deligianniko Komma. "At a time when parties are more or less identified with their parliamentary group and have virtually no other symbols or party apparatus, the symbolic figure of the leader offers a constant point of reference for members."
