= Theodoros Deligiannis =

Greek politician (1826–1905)

- Θεόδωρος Δηλιγιάννης
- Deligiannis in 1896

Prime Minister of Greece
- In office 17 December 1904 – 9 June 1905
- Monarch: George I
- Preceded by: Georgios Theotokis
- Succeeded by: Dimitrios Rallis
- In office 24 November 1902 – 14 June 1903
- Monarch: George I
- Preceded by: Alexandros Zaimis
- Succeeded by: Georgios Theotokis
- In office 31 May 1895 – 18 April 1897
- Monarch: George I
- Preceded by: Nikolaos Deligiannis
- Succeeded by: Dimitrios Rallis
- In office 24 October 1890 – 18 February 1892
- Monarch: George I
- Preceded by: Charilaos Trikoupis
- Succeeded by: Konstantinos Konstantopoulos
- In office 19 April 1885 – 30 April 1886
- Monarch: George I
- Preceded by: Charilaos Trikoupis
- Succeeded by: Dimitrios Valvis

Personal details
- Born: April 1826 Kalavryta, Greece
- Died: 13 June 1905 (aged 79) Athens, Greece
- Party: National
- Parent: Panagos Deligiannis (father)
- Relatives: Nikolaos Deligiannis (cousin once removed)

Theodoros Deligiannis (also transliterated as Diligiannis; Greek: Θεόδωρος Δηλιγιάννης; April 1826 – 13 June 1905) was a Greek politician, minister and member of the Greek Parliament, who served as Prime Minister of Greece five times from 1885 until his assassination in 1905.

He led the National Party, which, alongside the New Party led by his primary political opponent, Charilaos Trikoupis, formed the two-party system of the time.

== Early life and career ==
He was born in Kalavryta.^{a} He studied law in Athens, and in 1843 entered the Ministry of the Interior, of which department he became permanent secretary in 1859. In 1862, on the deposition of King Otto, he became minister for foreign affairs in the provisional government. In 1867, he was Greek Minister at Paris. On his return to Athens he became a member of successive cabinets in various capacities, and rapidly collected a party around him consisting of those who opposed his great rival, Charilaos Trikoupis. He eventually became the leader of the National Party.

In the so-called Oecumenical Ministry of 1877 he voted for war with Turkey. On that ministry's fall, Deligiannis entered the cabinet of Koumoundouros as minister for foreign affairs. He was a representative of Greece at the Berlin Congress in 1878. From this time forward, and particularly after 1882, when Trikoupis again came into power at the head of a strong party, the duel between these two statesmen was the leading feature of Greek politics.

Deligiannis first formed a cabinet in 1885; but his warlike policy, the aim of which was, by threatening Turkey, to force the Great Powers to make concessions in order to avoid the risk of a European war, ended in failure. For the powers, in order to stop his excessive armaments, eventually blockaded the Piraeus and other ports, and this brought about his downfall. He returned to power in 1890, with a radical programme, but his failure to deal with the financial crisis produced a conflict between him and the king, and his disrespectful attitude resulted in his summary dismissal in 1892. Deligiannis evidently expected the public to side with him; but at the elections he was badly beaten.

In 1895, however, he again became prime minister, and was at the head of affairs during the Cretan Revolt (1897–1898) and the opening of the Greco-Turkish War (1897). The easy defeat which ensued caused his fall from power in April 1897. Deligiannis himself had been led into the disastrous war policy to some extent against his will. The king again dismissed him from office when he declined to resign. Deligiannis kept his own seat at the election of 1899, but his following dwindled to small dimensions. He quickly recovered his influence, however, and he was again president of the council and minister of the interior.

== Death ==
On 13 June 1905, he was assassinated in revenge for the rigorous measures taken by him against gambling houses. His attacker, a professional gambler named Antonios Gherakaris, stabbed him with a dagger in the abdomen as he was entering the parliament. The incident took place at 5pm; an emergency operation failed to stop his internal bleeding and Deligiannis died at 7.30pm.

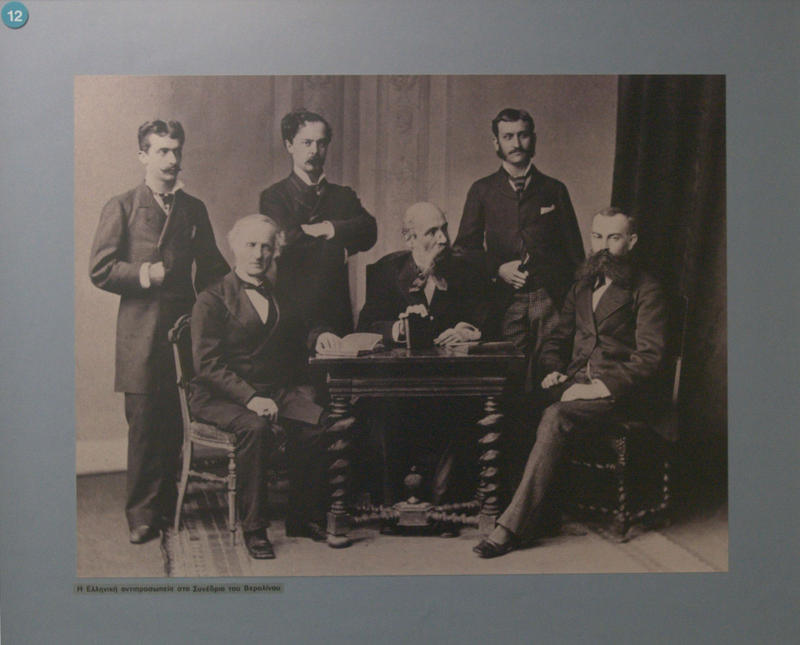
Deligiannis and the Greek delegation at the 1878 Berlin Congress

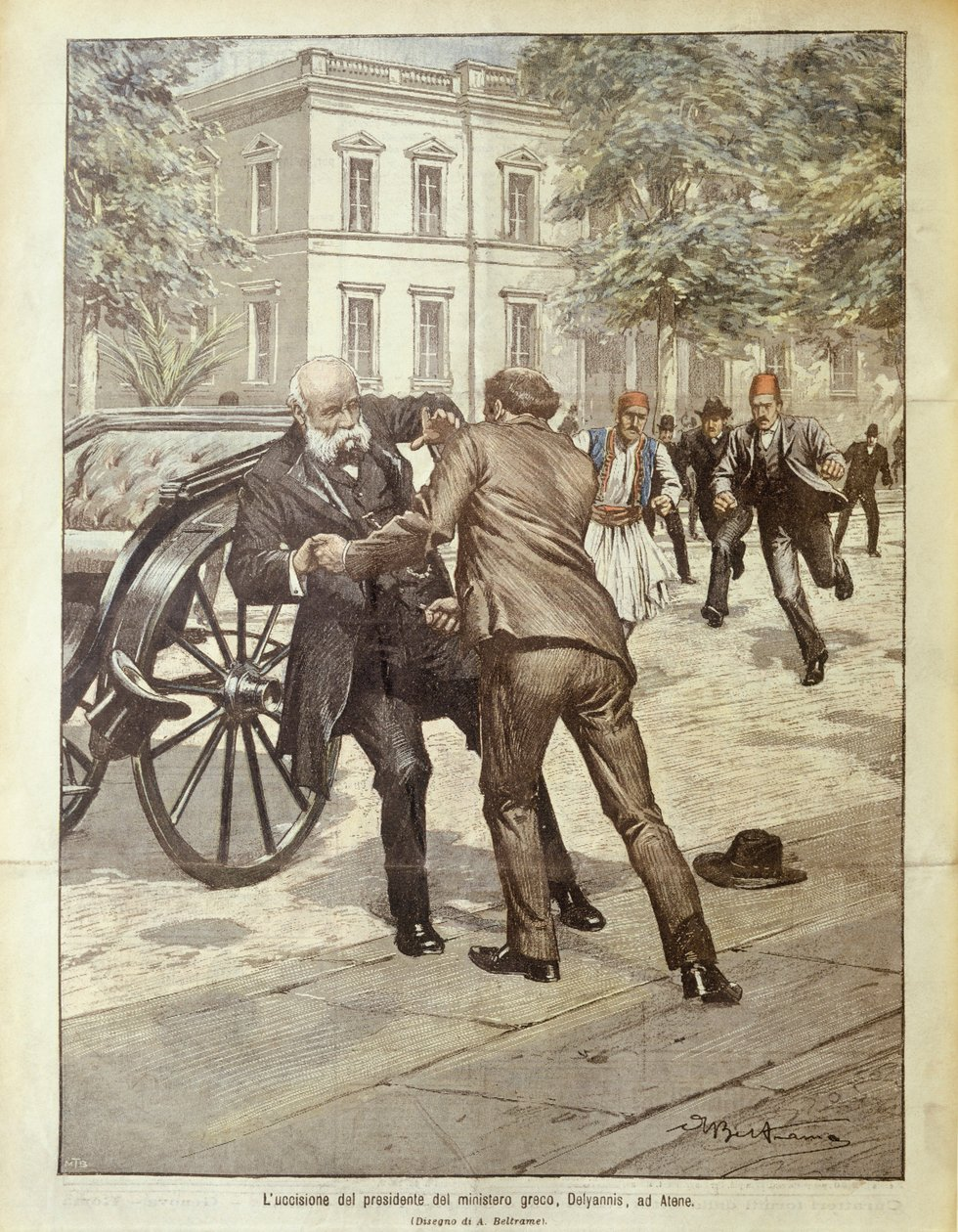
The assassination of Deligiannis, by Achille Beltrame

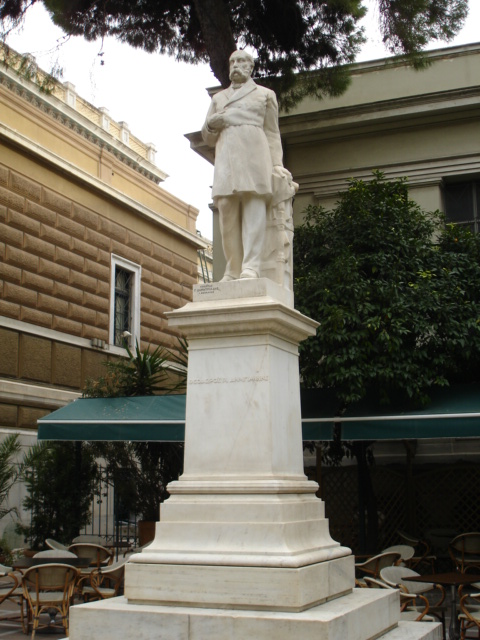
Statue near the old parliament (sculp. Georgios Dimitriades)

== Notes ==
- ^a It is not clear in which town was born. According to his first biographer, Geogrios Stefanou, Tripoli, Nafplio, Kalavryta or Pyrgos are the possible cities of birth.

== Sources ==
- Phantis

Political offices
Preceded by Charilaos Trikoupis	Prime Minister of Greece; 19 April 1885 - 30 April 1886	Succeeded by Dimitrios Valvis
Preceded by Charilaos Trikoupis	Prime Minister of Greece; 24 October 1890 - 18 February 1892	Succeeded by Konstantinos Konstantopoulos
Preceded by Nikolaos Deligiannis	Prime Minister of Greece; 31 May 1895 - 18 April 1897	Succeeded by Dimitrios Rallis
Preceded by Alexandros Zaimis	Prime Minister of Greece; 24 November 1902 - 14 June 1903	Succeeded by Georgios Theotokis
Preceded by Georgios Theotokis	Prime Minister of Greece; 17 December 1904 - 9 June 1905	Succeeded by Dimitrios Rallis
