= Charilaos Trikoupis =

Greek politician; Prime Minister intermittently between 1875 and 1895

- Χαρίλαος Τρικούπης
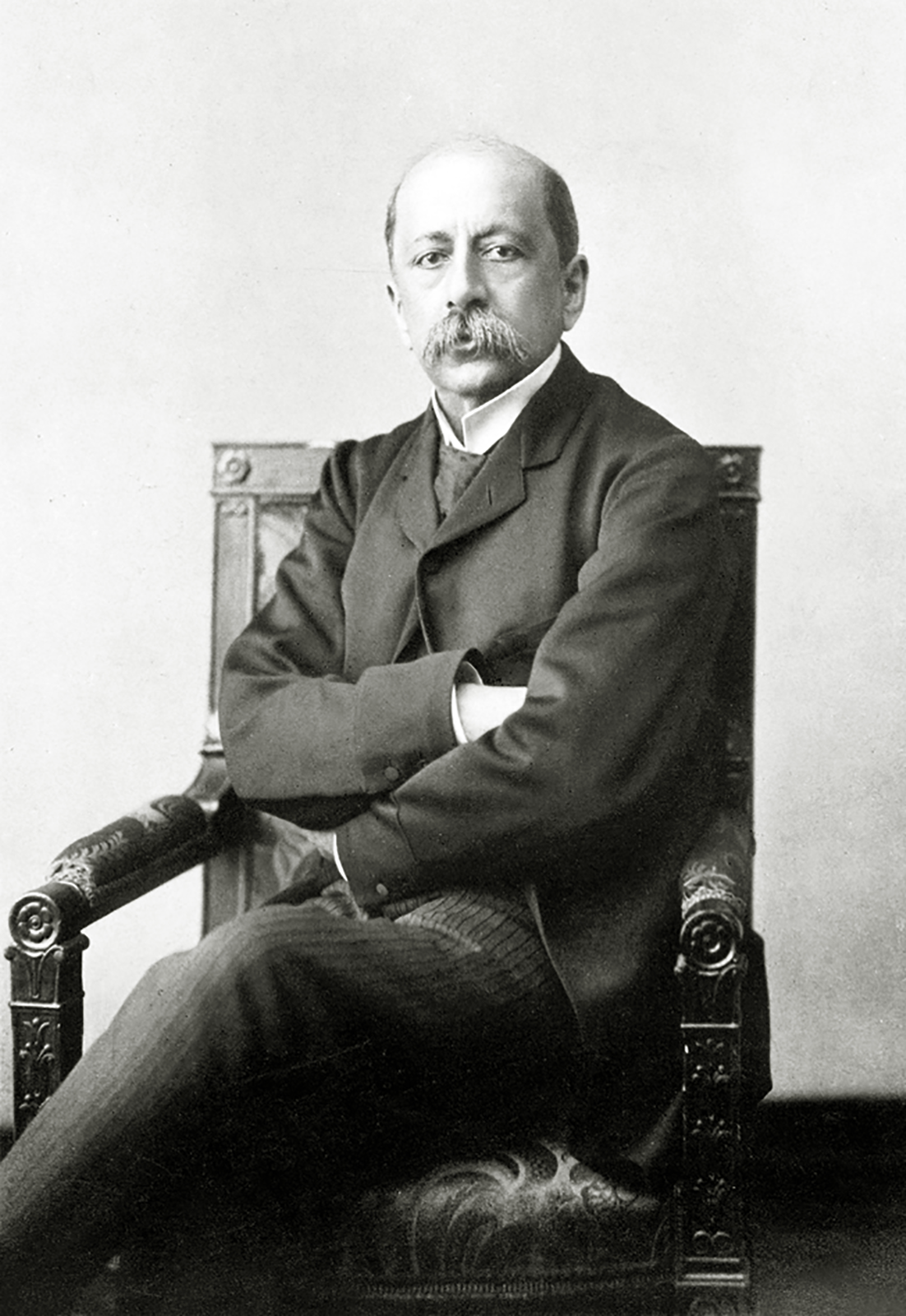
- Charilaos Trikoupis (1880 photograph)

Prime Minister of Greece
- In office 30 October 1893 – 12 January 1895
- Monarch: George I
- Preceded by: Sotirios Sotiropoulos
- Succeeded by: Nikolaos Deligiannis
- In office 10 June 1892 – 3 May 1893
- Monarch: George I
- Preceded by: Konstantinos Konstantopoulos
- Succeeded by: Sotirios Sotiropoulos
- In office 9 May 1886 – 24 October 1890
- Monarch: George I
- Preceded by: Dimitrios Valvis
- Succeeded by: Theodoros Deligiannis
- In office 3 March 1882 – 19 April 1885
- Monarch: George I
- Preceded by: Alexandros Koumoundouros
- Succeeded by: Theodoros Deligiannis
- In office 10 March 1880 – 13 October 1880
- Monarch: George I
- Preceded by: Alexandros Koumoundouros
- Succeeded by: Alexandros Koumoundouros
- In office 21 October 1878 – 26 October 1878
- Monarch: George I
- Preceded by: Alexandros Koumoundouros
- Succeeded by: Alexandros Koumoundouros
- In office 27 April 1875 – 15 October 1875
- Monarch: George I
- Preceded by: Dimitrios Voulgaris
- Succeeded by: Alexandros Koumoundouros

Personal details
- Born: 11 June 1832 Nafplio, Greece
- Died: 30 March 1896 (aged 63) Cannes, France
- Resting place: Athens, Greece
- Party: Modernist Party
- Parent: Spyridon Trikoupis (father)
- Relatives: Alexandros Mavrokordatos (uncle)

Charilaos Trikoupis (Greek: Χαρίλαος Τρικούπης; 11 July 1832 – 30 March 1896) was a Greek politician who served as a Prime Minister of Greece seven times from 1875 until 1895.

He is best remembered for introducing the vote of confidence in the Greek constitution, proposing and funding such ambitious and modern projects as the construction of the Corinth Canal, but also eventually leading the country to bankruptcy. Nowadays, he is considered the founder of modern Greece.

== Background ==
Born in Nafplio in 1832, with family ties to Messolonghi, he was the son of Spyridon Trikoupis, a politician who was Prime Minister of Greece briefly in 1833, and Ekaterini Mavrokordatou, sister of Alexandros Mavrokordatos, who also served as a Prime Minister.

After studying law and literature in University of Athens and in Paris, where he obtained his doctorate, he was sent to London in 1852 as an attaché of the Greek legation. By 1863, he had risen to be chargé d'affaires, but he aimed rather at a political not a diplomatic career. Trikoupis's family had been original supporters of the English Party; that and his reserved nature bestowed on him the nickname "Ο Άγγλος, the Englishman".

In 1865, after he had concluded the negotiations for the cession by United Kingdom to Greece of the Ionian Islands, he returned to Athens and in 1865 he was elected to the Hellenic Parliament, and in the following year was made Minister for Foreign Affairs, at the young age of thirty-four.

== "Who's to Blame?" ==
In 1872 he created his own party, called the Fifth Party (Πέμπτο Κόμμα) on a reformist agenda. On June 29, 1874 (Julian calendar) he published a manifesto in the Athens daily Kairoi entitled "Who's to blame?" (Greek: Τις Πταίει;) for people's lack of trust in the system, naming George I of Greece as the answer. Specifically, he criticized George for bypassing public opinion expressed in elections in his selection of Prime Ministers. Trikoupis wrote that the political instability, which characterized public life was due to the privilege of the Crown, as far as the appointment and ousting of governments was concerned. This privilege may have derived from the Greek Constitution of 1864, but it resulted in the formation of weak minority governments, which were based exclusively on the royal favor.

Moreover, the manifesto underlined that if "remedy is not applied", the country will revolt. In order to prevent this, the writer suggested the restriction of the royal privileges with the introduction of the principle of "declared confidence" (confidence vote) which, as he supported, would bring about the harmonization of the political life via the formation of a basically two-party parliamentary system: "As long as the King offers power [...] to the parliamentary minority, the suitors of the authority will multiply indefinitely. However, if he sincerely decides to invite to power only the majority, [...] the minorities will agree making concessions and will merge into a majority. [...] Therefore, it is not the fault of the regime, it is not the fault of the representatives of the Nation, it is not the fault of the Nation, if the Parliament is divided in many parties and has no majority when demanded. [...] The vice lies elsewhere and it is there that a remedy should be sought".

The article landed him briefly in jail but also boosted his popularity significantly. A year later, on May 8, 1875 he mustered a parliamentary majority and King George I reluctantly named him as Prime Minister as the leader of a new Reformist party called the New (or Modernist) Party (Νεωτεριστικόν Κόμμα).

== Political power and struggles ==
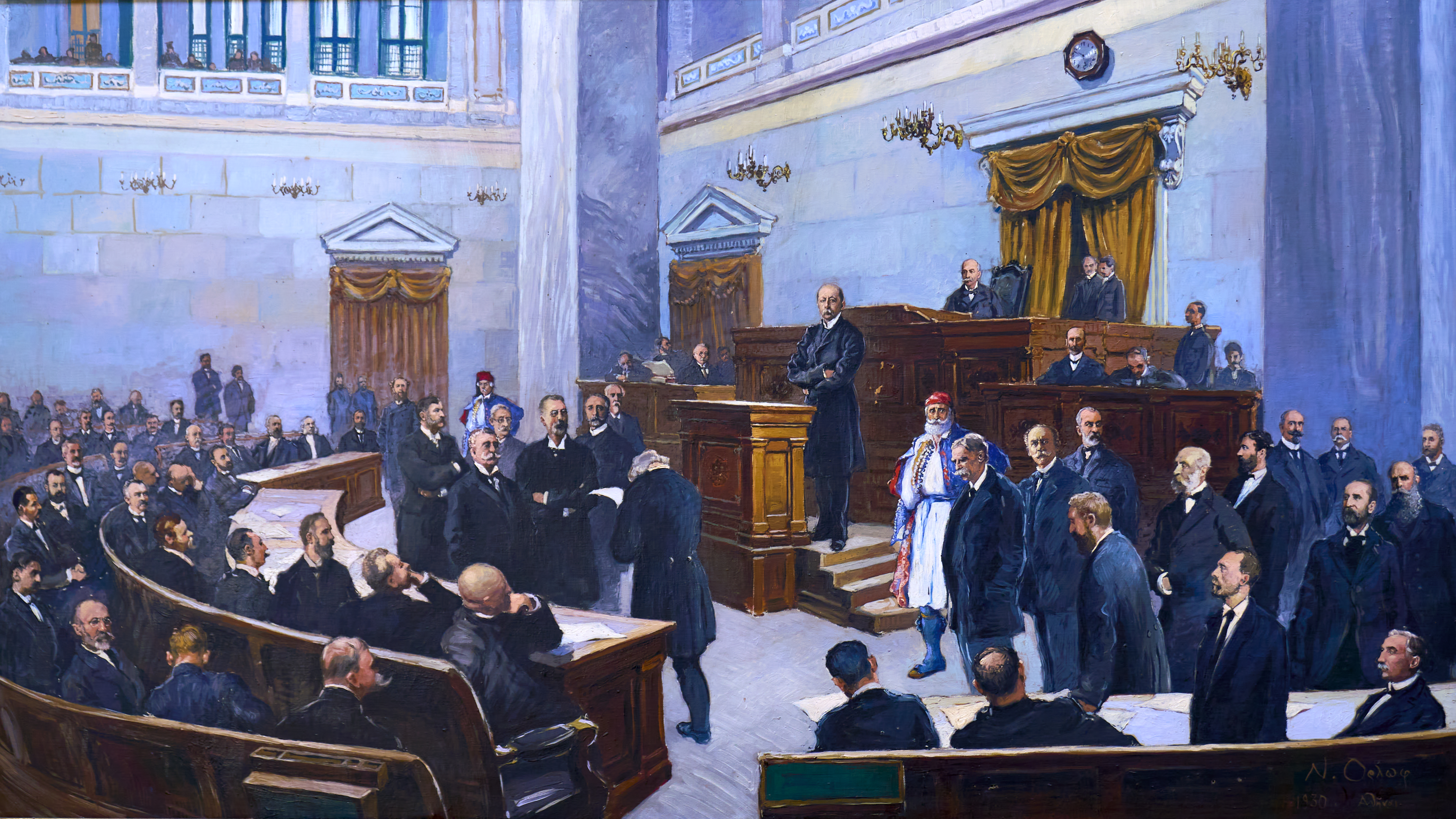
Trikoupis at the podium of the Hellenic Parliament.

Among his first acts was the reform of election law and the establishment of the "Dedilomeni principle" (Αρχή της Δεδηλωμένης), the "principle of declared confidence", or confidence vote, obliging the King to appoint the leader of the party with the majority of parliamentary votes as the Prime Minister. The dedilomeni principle may have contributed to Greece quickly becoming a two-party state as smaller parties merged in an effort to form majorities. Initially observed by convention, the dedilomeni has been incorporated into all subsequent Greek constitutions and ushered Greece into modern parliamentary politics. The opposing party to Trikoupis's Modernist Party was the conservative party led by Alexandros Koumoundouros.

With ever-changing alliances in parliament and fluctuating election results, Greece changed twelve prime ministers in the next six years. Trikoupis headed three of these short-lived governments. His short period in office meant he had no opportunity to begin carrying out the aggressive reform program which he had in mind. His foreign policy was to develop the resources of his country so as to create an army and a fleet and thus to give Greece the power to acquire a leading place among the nations of Southeastern Europe.

It was not until 1882 that he was able to take measures to this end. On March 15, 1882, he became prime minister for the third time (his second period of office, two years earlier, had lasted only for a few months), and at once set about the task of putting Greek finance upon a firmer basis, and of increasing the prosperity of the country by making roads, railways and harbours. Despite his vision of a progressive nation with modern infrastructure, Greece was a poor and backwards country in the latter part of the 19th century.

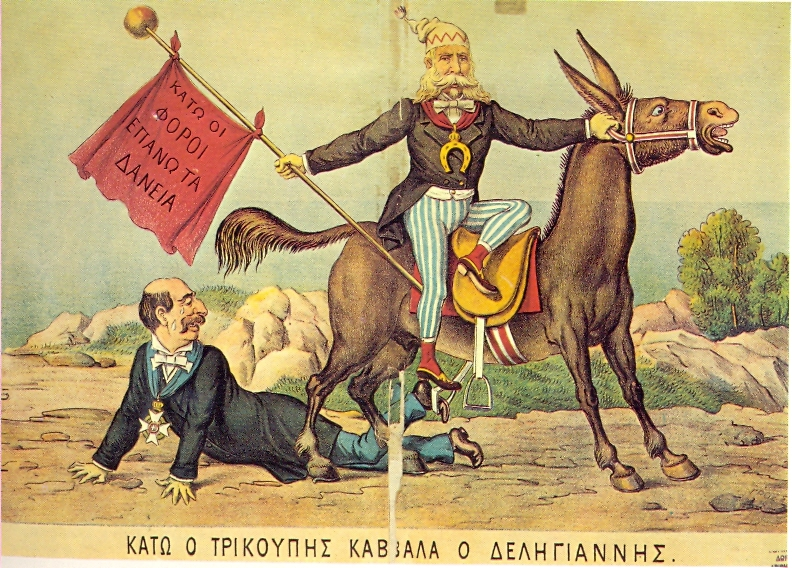
Greek satirical poster of 1895 depicting Trikoupis and his main political opponent Theodoros Deligiannis. The flag reads: "down with the taxes, up with the loans!"

His government was relatively stable and lasted for more than three years. During that time, he was able to push through an aggressive program of reforms. Trikoupis was a strong believer in the need to create an infrastructure to support the economy, and to attract foreign investment. A progressive program of road and railroad construction significantly improved internal communications. The most important of the works he campaigned for was the digging of the Corinth Canal. Another project that Trikoupis envisioned during that period was a bridge to connect the cities of Rio and Antirrio across the Gulf of Corinth. The bridge was beyond the technical and financial abilities of the young Kingdom at that time; construction began more than a century later. The bridge, officially named the Charilaos Trikoupis Bridge in his honour, was completed in 2004.

His difficulties, however, were now increased by the large expenditure that had been incurred for military preparations while he had been out of office as the result of the union effected between Bulgaria and Eastern Rumelia. The Greeks had demanded a compensation for this shifting of the balance of power from the Ottoman Empire and had prepared to enforce their demand by an appeal to arms. The Great Powers, however, interfered by blockading Piraeus to keep Greece quiet. Trikoupis nevertheless believed that he could raise the value of Greek paper currency to par in a short time, and all his calculations were based upon that assumption which he was not able to make happen.

He was defeated at the 1885 general election, but in the following year he resumed office and again took up the cause of economic and financial reform.

== Anti-athletic Olympic Games ==
Despite the Greek government receiving more than generous funding from Evangelis Zappas, back in 1856, for Athens to host athletic Olympic Games at the Panathinaiko Stadium, in perpetuity, members of the Greek government, notably Trikoupis and Stephanos Dragoumis, were resoundingly against them being athletic games. Trikoupis preferred an agro-industrial Olympics instead. The Zappeion, built to honor Zappas, was intended, by Trikoupis, to host agro-industrial competitions. Despite Trikoupis's anti-athletic politics, the Zappeion not only was the first indoor Olympic arena, hosting fencing in 1896, it also became the first Olympic Village in 1906. Coincidentally, Trikoupis died during the first week of the Athens 1896 Olympics.

== "Unfortunately, we are bankrupt" ==
His sixth turn in office (June 22, 1892 – May 15, 1893) was a dramatic one. The country's treasury had been depleted by overspending and systemic corruption often caused by political campaigns in which parties promised massive spending programs. Trikoupis stood before parliament and made the most famous statement of his career: "Unfortunately, we are bankrupt" (Greek: "Δυστυχώς επτωχεύσαμεν"). The servicing of foreign loans was suspended, and all non-essential spending was cut.

Trikoupis was again in power from November 11, 1893 until January 24, 1895. It was during that time that the planning for the 1896 Summer Olympics was begun. Trikoupis was skeptical about the games as he feared that the country could not shoulder the cost. He was convinced, eventually, to host them and made the needed arrangements. This would be his last term in office.

== Resignation and death ==
Trikoupis tried to make terms with the creditors of his nation, but he failed in that too. The taxation measures he proposed to combat the country's bankruptcy aroused great hostility, and in January, 1895 he resigned. At the general election, four months later, he and his Modernist Party were astoundingly defeated by his main political rival, Theodoros Deligiannis, and Trikoupis did not even manage to win a seat in the parliament. This led to him resigning from politics and moving to Cannes.

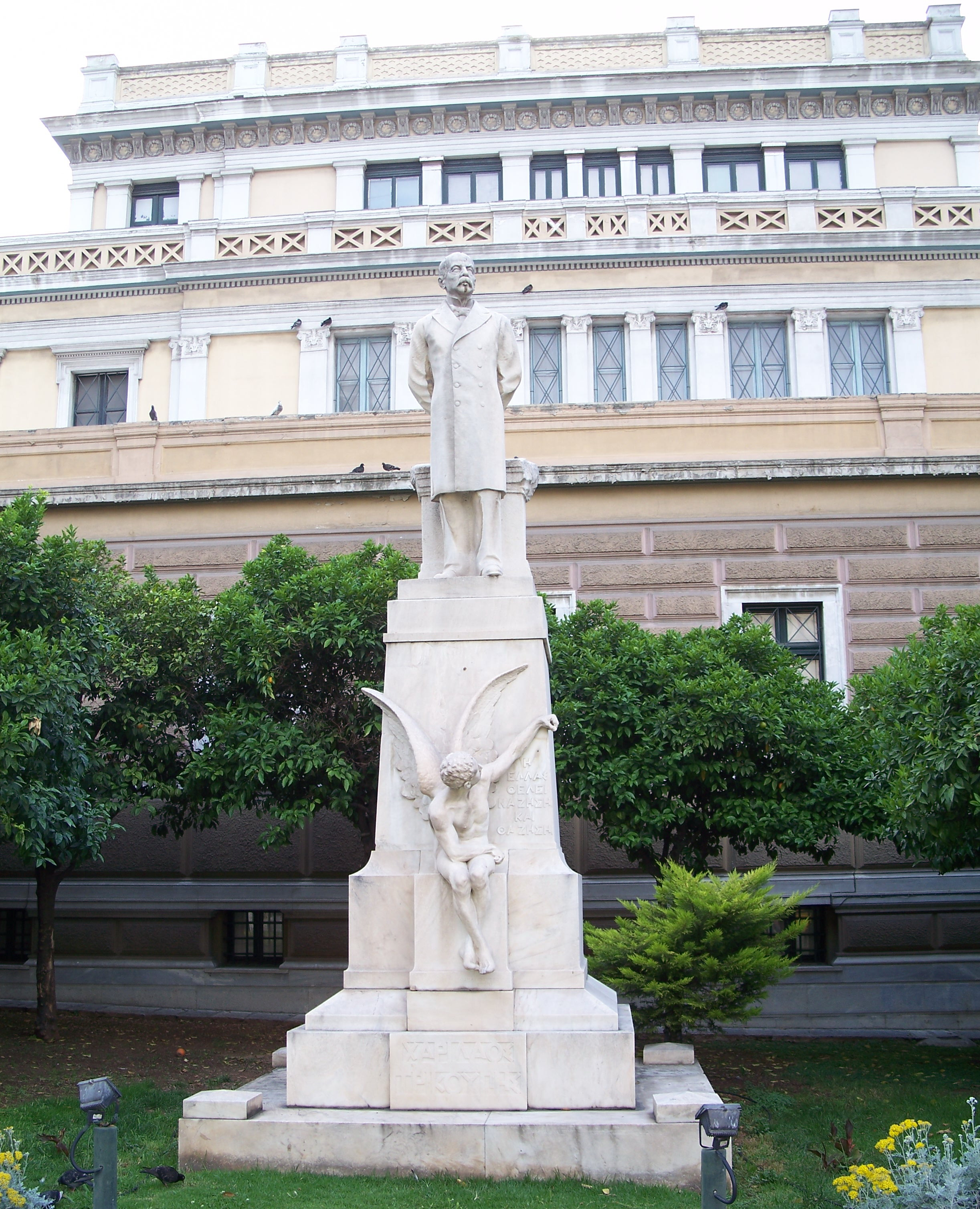
Statue to Trikoupis outside the Old Parliament in Athens.

In the 17 March 1896 elections, he was involuntarily nominated as an MP, and was elected back into Parliament, but Trikoupis never returned to Greece to assume his seat; he died in Cannes on 30 March 1896. He was buried in Athens.

== Legacy ==
Trikoupis is considered one of the greatest modern Greek politicians for his reformist and modernising programs as well as for the introduction of the dedilomeni principle. Roads in all major Greek cities, as well as the Rio–Antirrio Bridge, have been named after him.

== Sources ==
- Tsokapoulos, Βιογραφία Χαριλάου Τρικούπη, Athens, 1896.

Political offices
Preceded by Dimitrios Voulgaris	Prime Minister of Greece; 27 April - 15 October 1875	Succeeded by Alexandros Koumoundouros
Preceded by Alexandros Koumoundouros	Prime Minister of Greece; 21–26 October 1878	Succeeded by Alexandros Koumoundouros
Preceded by Alexandros Koumoundouros	Prime Minister of Greece; 10 March - 13 October 1880	Succeeded by Alexandros Koumoundouros
Preceded by Alexandros Koumoundouros	Prime Minister of Greece; 3 March 1882 - 19 April 1885	Succeeded by Theodoros Deligiannis
Preceded by Dimitrios Valvis	Prime Minister of Greece; 9 May 1886 - 24 October 1890	Succeeded by Theodoros Deligiannis
Preceded by Konstantinos Konstantopoulos	Prime Minister of Greece; 10 June 1892 - 3 May 1893	Succeeded by Sotirios Sotiropoulos
Preceded by Sotirios Sotiropoulos	Prime Minister of Greece; 30 October 1893 - 12 January 1895	Succeeded by Nikolaos Deligiannis
