= President of the Hellenic Parliament =

- Πρόεδρος της Βουλής των Ελλήνων
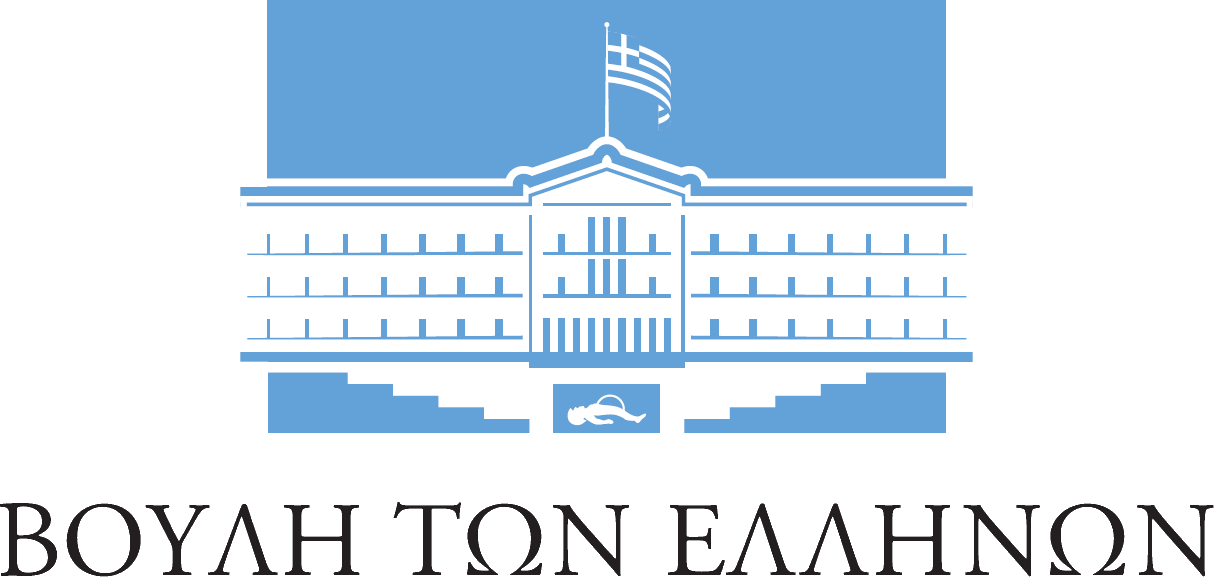

- Incumbent; Nikitas Kaklamanis since 22 January 2025
- Style: The Honourable
- Appointer: Hellenic Parliament
- Term length: Four years, renewable
- Inaugural holder: Alexandros Mavrokordatos
- Formation: 1844; 182 years ago Current Constitution: 11 June 1975; 51 years ago
- Website: Official Website

The president of the Hellenic Parliament is the presiding officer of the Parliament of Greece. The president's term coincides with the term of the assembly, and is chosen by a vote during the opening session, after each legislative election. Following is a list of speakers of the Hellenic Parliament or other national legislative bodies such as the Greek Senate, from the time of the Greek War of Independence till present. The official order of precedence ranks the speaker of the Hellenic Parliament in the 3rd position, after the President of the Republic and the Prime Minister.

The incumbent President is Nikitas Kaklamanis of New Democracy.

== Constitutional powers ==
According to the Constitution of Greece, in the event of a temporary absence of the president of the Hellenic Republic on account of illness, travel abroad or similar circumstances, the speaker of the parliament serves as acting president, and exercises the powers of the state president until the president resumes his functions, and in the event that the presidency falls vacant as a result of death or resignation or for any other reason, until the election of a new president.

The election of the Speaker of the Parliament is one of the most important moments in the operation of the Parliament, not only because the office of the Speaker of the Parliament is significant in itself, but also because the vote for the election of the Speaker constitutes the first opportunity for the assessment of the cohesiveness of the majority in Parliament. The Speaker is elected by the absolute majority of the total number of the MPs (i.e. by 151 votes). If this majority is not attained, the vote is repeated, and the candidate who gets the most votes is elected.

== Role ==
The Speaker of the Parliament directs the business of the Parliament, represents the Parliament, is responsible for the enforcement of disciplinary measures against parliamentarians, and generally, is the head of all the services of the Parliament and possesses all the responsibilities bestowed on him or her by the Constitution, the Standing Orders, or stemming from the principle of independence of Parliament. In other words, the Speaker has the final say on all matters that concern the inner workings of Parliament.

The Speaker is third in line in the Order of Precedence of the State, so the following of the President of the Republic and the Prime Minister and preceding the leader of the Opposition, is the president. Additionally, the Speaker stands in pro tempore for the President of the Republic when the latter is abroad for a prolonged period of time, passes away, resigns, is deposed, or is hindered from performing his or her duties for any reason whatsoever.

== Presidium ==
The Presidium of Parliament is the group of individuals elected by the Hellenic Parliament to deal with the business of organizing and running the Parliament. This is provided for by Article 65 of the Constitution of Greece.

The Presidium is:

- The President of Parliament
- Seven Deputy speakers
- Three Deans
- Six Secretaries

It is mandatory that the fourth Deputy Speaker, one dean and one secretary belong to the major opposition party, and that the fifth Deputy Speaker and one secretary belong to the second-in-power opposition party, and that the sixth Deputy Speaker belong to the third-in-power opposition party, and that the seventh Deputy Speaker belong to the fourth-in-power opposition party. A member of the Presidium, who of course must be a parliamentarian, cannot be a member of the Cabinet or an Under-Secretary.

The Deputy Speakers perform their duties as assigned to them by the Speaker or as provided in the Standing Orders. The Deans assist the Speaker in organizational and executive matters of the Parliament, while the Secretaries assist the Speaker in the Parliamentary sessions and are responsible for whatever else the Speaker assigns to them.

== List of presidents ==
=== Provisional government of the War of Independence, 1821–1827 ===
This includes the presidents of the various Greek National Assemblies and the Legislative Corps (Βουλευτικό) during the Greek War of Independence.

Note: all dates are Old Style

Name	Entered office	Left office	Office	Comments
Alexandros Mavrokordatos	December 20, 1821	January 15, 1822	President of the First National Assembly at Epidaurus	
Dimitrios Ypsilantis	January 15, 1822	March 17, 1823	President of the Legislative Corps	
Petrobey Mavromichalis	March 30, 1823	April 18, 1823	President of the Second National Assembly at Astros	
Ioannis Orlandos	April 26, 1823	May 22, 1823	President of the Legislative Corps	
Alexandros Mavrokordatos	July 12, 1823	July 14, 1823	President of the Legislative Corps	
Panoutsos Notaras	October 11, 1824	April 6, 1826	President of the Legislative Corps	
Georgios Sisinis	March 19, 1827	May 5, 1827	President of the Third National Assembly at Troezen	

=== First Hellenic Republic, 1827–1832 ===
This includes the presidents of the National Assemblies and the various legislative bodies under Governor Ioannis Kapodistrias and his successors.

Note: all dates are Old Style

Presidents of the National Assemblies and the Parliament (Βουλή)

Name	Entered office	Left office	Office	Comments
Nikolaos Renieris	July 20, 1827	January, 1828	President of the Parliament	
Georgios Sisinis	July 11, 1829	August 6, 1829	President of the Fourth National Assembly at Argos	
Dimitrios Tsamados	December 5, 1831	December 8, 1831	President of the Fifth National Assembly at Argos	
Dimitrios Tsamados	December 15, 1831	March 17, 1832	President of the Fifth National Assembly at Nafplion	
Panoutsos Notaras	June 11, 1832	August 20, 1832	President of the Fifth National Assembly at Nafplion	

Presidents of the Senate (Γερουσία)

Name	Entered office	Left office	Comments
Georgios Sisinis	September 12, 1829	June 15, 1830	
Dimitrios Tsamados	June 16, 1830	December 1831	

=== Reign of King Otto, 1843–1862 ===
When King Otto arrived in Greece, he was still a minor, and until 1835 the country was governed by a regency council. The regents ignored the so-called "Hegemonic Constitution" voted by the Fifth National Assembly, and when Otto assumed full powers, he ruled as an absolute monarch. The only "parliamentary" body was the 20-member Council of State (Συμβούλιο της Επικρατείας), but its role was purely consultative and it was strictly controlled by the King.

The 3 September 1843 Revolution forced Otto to grant a constitution, which was promulgated by the "3rd of September" National Assembly. The new constitution provided for a constitutional monarchy with a bicameral parliament composed of the Senate (Γερουσία) and the Parliament (Βουλή).

==== Presidents of the Parliament ====
The Parliament was to have no less than 80 members (in practice the number was between 127 and 142) with a three-year tenure (in practice some 2,5 years).

Note: all dates are Old Style

Name	Entered office	Left office	Party	Comments
Nikitas Stamatelopoulos	September 7, 1844	December 20, 1844	Russian Party	honorary president pro tempore
Kanellos Deligiannis	December 20, 1844	October 31, 1845	French Party	
Rigas Palamidis	December 19, 1845	April 14, 1847	French Party	
Dimitrios Kallifronas	September 2, 1847	September 10, 1848	French Party	
Dimitrios Chatziskos	November 13, 1848	October 5, 1849	French Party	
Antonios Georgantas	December 21, 1849	July 27, 1850	English Party	
Lazaros Giourdis	December 20, 1850	October 30, 1852		
Efstratios Parisis	November 6, 1852	October 27, 1853		
Panagiotis Varvoglis	December 30, 1853	April 20, 1854		Parliament dismissed by King Otto and not reconvened for 8 months
Thrasyvoulos Zaimis	February 2, 1855	October 25, 1855		
Alexandros Koumoundouros	November 9, 1855	June 27, 1856		Resigned
Ioannis Zarkos	June 28, 1856	October 1856		
Alexandros Kontostavlos	December 7, 1856	June 6, 1857		Initially president pro tempore, he was formally elected on 28 January 1857
Dimitrios Boudouris	October 30, 1857	1858		
Andreas Avgerinos	November 23, 1858	May 24, 1859		
Andreas Londos	December 17, 1859	May 18, 1860		
Thrasyvoulos Zaimis	October 30, 1860	November 16, 1860		Opposition candidate, his election led to the dismissal of parliament by the King
Anargyros Chatzianargyrou	March 22, 1861	August 11, 1861		
Filon Filonos	October 4, 1861	May 1862		
Leonidas Petimezas	May 10, 1862	September 11, 1862		Last president of the Ottonian period, following Otto's ouster in a revolution on October 10, 1862

==== Presidents of the Senate ====
The Senate had a minimum of 27 members and could reach 39. Senators had to be over 40 years old, were named by the King and served for life. As a clearly monarchical instrument, it was abolished after 1862.

Note: all dates are Old Style

Name	Entered office	Left office	Party	Comments
Georgios Kountouriotis	September 26, 1844	April 8, 1847	French Party	
Anagnostis Deligiannis	September 17, 1847	October 17, 1853		
Anagnostis Monarchidis	November 23, 1853	August 11, 1861		

=== First period of the Constitutional monarchy, 1863–1924 ===
After the ousting of King Otto, elections were held to form the Second National Assembly, which effectively ran the country until the arrival of King George I in October 1863. The Assembly thereafter promulgated the Constitution of 1864 and dissolved itself on 16 November 1864. The new constitution was liberal, established the principle of popular sovereignty and defined the country's new form of government as a Constitutional monarchy with parliamentary democracy (βασιλευομένη δημοκρατία), but retained considerable executive powers for the king. The Senate was abolished, and a unicameral parliament (Βουλή) of 181 members with a four-year term was proclaimed as the country's sole legislative body.

The first decade was marked by frequent changes of government, especially due to the king's interference. A landmark was the adoption of the "dedilomeni principle", championed by Charilaos Trikoupis, in 1875, which forced the king to appoint only governments that commanded a parliamentary majority and had the "declared (dedilomeni) confidence of the parliament". The 1880s and 1890s were also marked by political instability. The Goudi coup of 1909 resulted in the arrival of Eleftherios Venizelos and the August 1910 elections for a Revisoniary Parliament. New elections for a new Revisoniary Parliament were held in November, and the Constitution of 1911 was promulgated in June 1911. Political upheaval in the form of the National Schism dominated Greek politics from 1915 on, resulting in the Asia Minor Disaster and the abolition of the monarchy in 1924.

Note: all dates are Old Style

Name	Entered office	Left office	Party	Comments
Dimitrios Kriezis	December 10, 1862	January 17, 1863		President pro tempore of the Second National Assembly
Zinovios Valvis	January 17, 1863	February 17, 1863		President of the Second National Assembly along with four vice-presidents; it was agreed that each of the vice-presidents would in turn occupy the post of president. Valvis headed a provisional government composed of Assembly members from 13 February to 25 March.
Aristidis Moraitinis	February 17, 1863	May 20, 1863		One of the original four vice-presidents of the Second National Assembly
Diomidis Kyriakos	May 20, 1863	July 20, 1863		One of the original four vice-presidents of the Second National Assembly
Aristidis Moraitinis	July 20, 1863	October 28, 1863		President of the Second National Assembly
Ioannis Messinezis	October 28, 1863	April 11, 1864		President of the Second National Assembly
Epameinondas Deligeorgis	April 11, 1864	August 13, 1864		President of the Second National Assembly
Ioannis Messinezis	August 13, 1864	November 16, 1864		President of the Second National Assembly until its dissolution
Efthymios Kechagias	July 8, 1865	January 5, 1866		President of the parliament resulting from the 1865 elections
Efthymios Kechagias	January 10, 1866	December 14, 1866		
Lykourgos Krestenitis	December 14, 1866	September 25, 1867		
Iakovos Paximadis	September 25, 1867	December 21, 1867		
Triandafyllos Lazaretos	June 24, 1868	November 18, 1868		President of the parliament resulting from the 1868 elections
Dimitrios Drosos	November 18, 1868	March 17, 1869		
Dimitrios Christidis	July 12, 1869	December 17, 1870		President of the parliament resulting from the 1869 elections
Konstantinos Lomvardos	December 17, 1870	October 25, 1871		
Dimitrios Chatziskos	October 25, 1871	December 28, 1871		
Spyridon Milios	June 7, 1872	November 28, 1872		President of the parliament resulting from the 1872 elections
Ioannis Deligiannis	May 11, 1873	January 30, 1874		President of the parliament resulting from the 1873 elections
Thrasyvoulos Zaimis	January 20, 1874	April 24, 1874		
Ioannis Zarkos	November 14, 1874	December 3, 1874		President of the parliament resulting from the 1874 elections
Stylianos Kasimatis	March 20, 1875	May 19, 1875		
Alexandros Koumoundouros	October 9, 1875	October 15, 1875		President of the parliament resulting from the 1875 elections
Thrasyvoulos Zaimis	October 4, 1876	March 18, 1877		
Andreas Avgerinos	May 16, 1877	October 18, 1878		
Sotirios Sotiropoulos	October 18, 1878	July 6, 1879		
Nikolaos Papamichalopoulos	July 6, 1879	July 14, 1879		
Sotirios Sotiropoulos	November 29, 1879	October 10, 1880		President of the parliament resulting from the 1879 elections
Andreas Avgerinos	October 10, 1880	October 22, 1881		
Spyridon Valaoritis	February 26, 1882	November 4, 1883		President of the parliament resulting from the 1881 elections
Pavlos Kalligas	November 4, 1883	February 11, 1885		
Dimitrios Kallifronas	June 26, 1885	October 12, 1885		President of the parliament resulting from the 1885 elections
Antonios Rikakis	October 12, 1885	May 8, 1886		
Stefanos Stefanopoulos	May 8, 1886	November 5, 1886		
Andreas Avgerinos	February 22, 1887	August 17, 1890		President of the parliament resulting from the 1887 elections
Konstantinos Konstantopoulos	December 15, 1890	February 18, 1891		President of the parliament resulting from the 1890 elections
Nikolaos Georgiadis	November 15, 1891	March 12, 1892		
Vasilios Voudouris	June 8, 1892	February 20, 1895		President of the parliament resulting from the 1892 elections
Alexandros Zaimis	May 29, 1895	November 3, 1897		President of the parliament resulting from the 1895 elections
Alexandros Romas	November 3, 1897	December 9, 1898		
Nikolaos Tsamados	April 2, 1899	November 6, 1900		President of the parliament resulting from the 1899 elections
Nikolaos Boufidis	November 6, 1900	November 8, 1901		
Theodoros Retsinas	November 8, 1901	September 19, 1902		
Dimitrios Rallis	February 5, 1903	June 18, 1903		President of the parliament resulting from the 1902 elections
Nikolaos Leonidas	June 18, 1903	December 15, 1903		
Nikolaos Chatziskos	December 15, 1903	December 12, 1904		
Alexandros Romas	April 7, 1905	November 28, 1905		President of the parliament resulting from the 1905 elections
Nikolaos Boufidis	November 28, 1905	February 1, 1906		
Nikolaos Boufidis	May 8, 1906	November 18, 1906		President of the parliament resulting from the 1906 elections
Nikolaos Levidis	November 18, 1906	October 12, 1908		
Konstantinos Koumoundouros	October 12, 1908	September 24, 1909		
Alexandros Romas	September 24, 1909	February 4, 1910		
Nikolaos Tsamados	February 4, 1910	July 1, 1910		
Konstantinos Esslin (von Hößlin)	September 27, 1910	October 12, 1910		President of the First Revisionary Parliament, resulting from the August 1910 elections
Nikolaos Stratos	January 24, 1911	July 7, 1911		President of the Second Revisionary Parliament, resulting from the November 1910 elections
Ioannis Tsirimokos	July 7, 1911	December 21, 1911		President of the Second Revisionary Parliament
Ioannis Tsirimokos	August 19, 1912	October 2, 1912		President of the parliament resulting from the 1912 elections
Konstantinos Zavitsianos	October 2, 1912	February 25, 1915	Liberal Party	
Konstantinos Zavitsianos	August 3, 1915	October 25, 1915	Liberal Party	President of the parliament resulting from the May 1915 elections
Michail Theotokis	January 22, 1916	June 9, 1916		President of the parliament resulting from the December 1915 elections
Themistoklis Sophoulis	July 20, 1917	September 10, 1920	Liberal Party	President of the restored 1915 parliament ("Lazarus Parliament")
Konstantinos Argasaris–Lomvardos	January 18, 1921	September 15, 1922		President of the Third National Assembly, resulting from the 1920 elections
Eleftherios Venizelos	January 5, 1924	January 11, 1924	Liberal Party	President of the Fourth National Assembly, resulting from the 1923 elections

=== Second Hellenic Republic, 1924–1935 ===
The Fourth National Assembly of the Greece, resulting from the December 1923 elections, declared the abolition of the monarchy and constituted itself as the Fourth Constitutional Assembly on 25 March 1924. On 30 September 1925, the Parliament was abolished after the 25 June coup d'état led by Theodoros Pangalos. The first regular parliament, after the coup, of the Second Hellenic Republic came about only after Pangalos' fall, with the 1926 elections. The new parliament voted the Constitution of 1927, which also re-established the Senate, for which the first elections were held in 1929.

==== Presidents of the Parliament ====
Name	Entered office	Left office	Party	Comments
Konstantinos Raktivan	January 21, 1924	September 30, 1925	Liberal Party	President of the Fourth National Assembly
Themistoklis Sofoulis	December 6, 1926	July 9, 1928	Liberal Party	President of the parliament resulting from the 1926 elections
Ioannis Tsirimokos	October 19, 1928	July 3, 1930	Liberal Party	President of the parliament resulting from the 1928 elections
Themistoklis Sofoulis	November 17, 1930	August 20, 1932	Liberal Party	
Themistoklis Sofoulis	November 2, 1932	January 24, 1933	Liberal Party	President of the parliament resulting from the 1932 elections
Charalambos Vozikis	March 30, 1933	April 1, 1935	People's Party	President of the parliament resulting from the 1933 elections
Charalambos Vozikis	July 1, 1935	October 10, 1935	People's Party	President of the Fifth National Assembly, resulting from the 1935 elections. Dissolved by General Georgios Kondylis following his coup d'état on 10 October
Themistoklis Sofoulis	March 6, 1936	August 4, 1936	Liberal Party	President of the parliament resulting from the 1936 elections (Third Revisionary). Dissolved by Prime Minister Ioannis Metaxas, establishment of the 4th of August Regime

==== Presidents of the Senate ====
Name	Entered office	Left office	Party	Comments
Alexandros Zaimis	May 22, 1929	December 14, 1929	None	Resigned after his election as President of the Republic
Leonidas Paraskevopoulos	March 18, 1930	August 19, 1932	None, but pro-Liberal Party	
Stylianos Gonatas	November 4, 1932	April 1, 1935	Liberal Party	Senate abolished by the Panagis Tsaldaris government, following the suppression of a pro-Venizelist and pro-Republican coup attempt

=== Second period of the Constitutional monarchy, 1946–1967 ===
This includes the post-World War II period up to the establishment of the Greek military junta of 1967–1974.

Name	Entered office	Left office	Party	Comments
Ioannis Theotokis	April 4, 1946	November 30, 1949	People's Party	
Praxitelis Moutzouridis	December 1, 1949	January 8, 1950	People's Party	
Dimitrios Gontikas	April 4, 1950	October 10, 1952	Liberal Party	
Ioannis Makropoulos	December 15, 1952	November 16, 1953	Greek Rally	
Konstantinos Rodopoulos	November 16, 1953	September 26, 1963	Greek Rally	
Konstantinos Rodopoulos	November 16, 1953	September 26, 1963	National Radical Union	
Ilias Tsirimokos	December 17, 1963	January 8, 1964	Center Union	
Georgios Athanasiadis-Novas	March 19, 1964	July 15, 1965	Center Union	Resigned after being nominated for PM by King Constantine II, beginning the Iouliana
Emmanouil Baklantzis	April 30, 1965	September 25, 1965	Center Union	President pro tempore
Dimitrios Papaspyrou	November 15, 1965	April 14, 1967	National Radical Union	Parliament dissolved following coup d'état

=== Third Hellenic Republic, 1974 to the present ===
The fall of the junta brought about a major regime change (metapolitefsi), which included the abolition of the monarchy by referendum. The strong two-party system of PASOK and New Democracy made the parliamentary life of the Third Hellenic Republic the most regular in Greek political history, with the exception of the 1989–90 political crisis. After 2011, the prevailing political system was shattered through the effects of the prolonged Greek debt crisis, leading to the marginalization of PASOK and the election, for the first time, of a left-wing party, the Coalition of the Radical Left, to power in the January 2015 elections.

Portrait	Name	Entered office	Left office	Party	Comments
	Konstantinos Papakonstantinou	December 9, 1974	December 12, 1977	New Democracy	Parliament (Fifth Revisionary) resulting from the 1974 elections
	Dimitrios Papaspyrou	December 12, 1977	November 17, 1981	New Democracy	Parliament resulting from the 1977 elections
	Ioannis Alevras	November 17, 1981	June 18, 1985	Panhellenic Socialist Movement	Parliament resulting from the 1981 elections
	Ioannis Alevras	June 18, 1985	July 4, 1989	Panhellenic Socialist Movement	Parliament (Sixth Revisionary) resulting from the 1985 elections
	Athanasios Tsaldaris	July 4, 1989	November 21, 1989	New Democracy	Parliament resulting from the June 1989 elections
	Athanasios Tsaldaris	November 21, 1989	April 22, 1990	New Democracy	Parliament resulting from the November 1989 elections
	Athanasios Tsaldaris	April 22, 1990	October 22, 1993	New Democracy	Parliament resulting from the 1990 elections
	Apostolos Kaklamanis	October 22, 1993	October 8, 1996	Panhellenic Socialist Movement	Parliament resulting from the 1993 elections
	Apostolos Kaklamanis	October 8, 1996	April 21, 2000	Panhellenic Socialist Movement	Parliament resulting from the 1996 elections
	Apostolos Kaklamanis	April 21, 2000	March 19, 2004	Panhellenic Socialist Movement	Parliament (Seventh Revisionary) resulting from the 2000 elections
	Anna Benaki-Psarouda	March 19, 2004	September 27, 2007	New Democracy	Parliament resulting from the 2004 elections, first female speaker
	Dimitris Sioufas	September 27, 2007	October 15, 2009	New Democracy	Parliament (Eighth Revisionary) resulting from the 2007 elections
	Philippos Petsalnikos	October 15, 2009	May 18, 2012	Panhellenic Socialist Movement	Parliament resulting from the 2009 elections
	Vyron Polydoras	May 18, 2012	June 29, 2012	New Democracy	Parliament resulting from the May 2012 elections
	Vangelis Meimarakis	June 29, 2012	February 6, 2015	New Democracy	Parliament resulting from the June 2012 elections
	Zoi Konstantopoulou	February 6, 2015	October 4, 2015	Coalition of the Radical Left	Parliament resulting from the January 2015 elections
	Nikos Voutsis	October 4, 2015	July 18, 2019	Coalition of the Radical Left	Parliament resulting from the September 2015 elections
	Konstantinos Tasoulas	July 18, 2019	May 29, 2023	New Democracy	Parliament resulting from the 2019 elections
	Konstantinos Tasoulas	May 29, 2023		New Democracy	Parliament resulting from May 2023 elections
	Konstantinos Tasoulas	July 3, 2023	16 January 2025	New Democracy	Parliament resulting from the June 2023 elections
	Nikitas Kaklamanis	22 January 2025	Incumbent	New Democracy	Following the resignation of Tasoulas after being nominated for President of Greece

== See also ==
- History of modern Greece
- Politics of Greece

== Sources ==
- Πρόεδροι της Βουλής και των Εθνοσυνελεύσεων, 1821–2008 [Presidents of Parliament and the National Assemblies, 1821–2008] (PDF) (in Greek). foundation.parliament.gr. 2009. ISBN 978-960-6757-16-7.
