= Antonios Georgantas =

Greek politician (1799–1884)

- Αντώνιος Γεωργαντάς
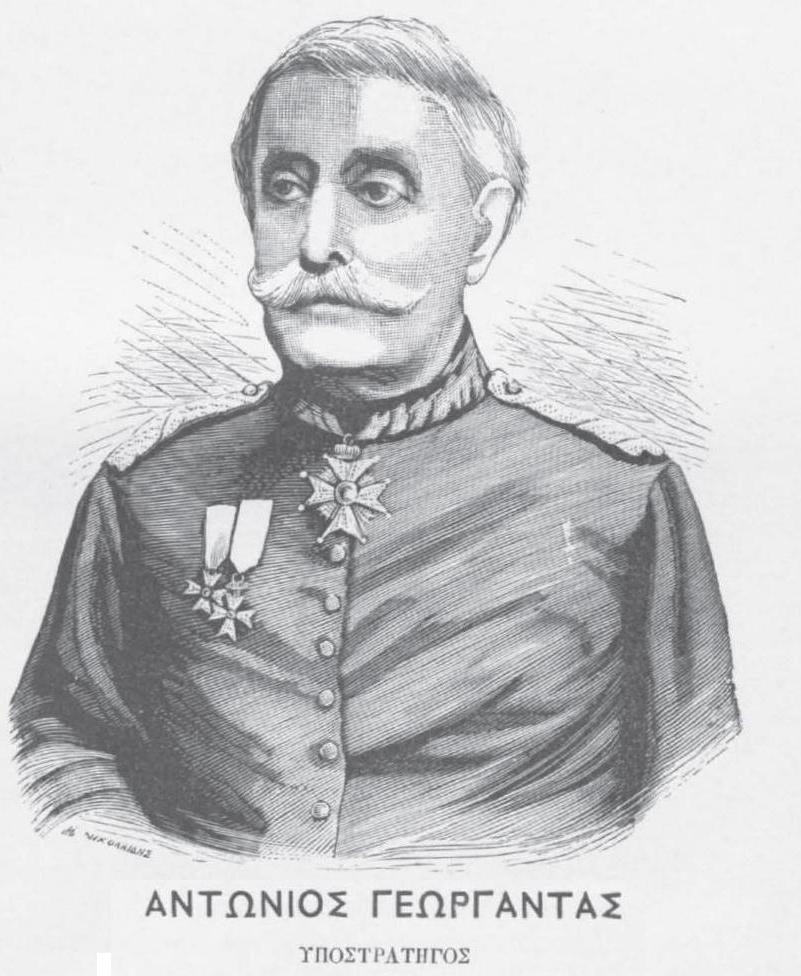
- A portrait of Antonios Georgantas

Speaker of the Hellenic Parliament
- In office 21 December 1849 – 27 July 1850
- Monarch: Otto
- Prime Minister: Antonios Kriezis

Senator
- In office 1860–1864
- Monarchs: Otto; George I

Personal details
- Born: 1799 Livadeia, Sanjak of Eğriboz, Ottoman Empire (now Greece)
- Died: 15 January 1884 (aged 84–85) Athens, Kingdom of Greece
- Awards: Commander of the Order of the Redeemer

Military service
- Allegiance: First Hellenic Republic; Kingdom of Greece
- Branch/service: Hellenic Army
- Unit: Royal Phalanx
- Battles/wars: Greek War of Independence; Battle of Phaleron; Battle of Petra; 3 September 1843 Revolution

Antonios Georgantas (Greek: Αντώνιος Γεωργαντάς; 1799 – 15 January 1884) was a Greek Major General and revolutionary of the Greek War of Independence.

== Biography ==
He was born in Livadeia in March 1799. With the start of the Greek War of Independence, he volunteered and served as an adjutant of Odysseas Androutsos and secretary of Georgios Karaiskakis. He fought in the battles of Phaleron, Petra, Karystos, Distomo, where he was distinguished, in result him being assigned several missions as a chieftain.

He later resigned from office as he said there were other chieftains who were equally worthy of the rank, and that just the rank of the soldier was a sufficient honour for him.

When in 1835 the Royal Phalanx was established, in which "honourable" fighters of the revolution were ranked, he was honored as a colonel of the phalanx. Since 1836 he began his political career, becoming mayor of his native Livadeia, and later chairman of the provincial council. He took on an important role in the 3 September 1843 Revolution and in the elections that followed he was elected deputy of Levadia at the First National Assembly of 1843. He was elected again a member of the council of Leivadia in the elections of 1847 and during the cabinet of Antonios Kriezis he was elected Speaker of the Hellenic Parliament on 21 December 1849. He remained in the position until 27 July 1850. He was re-elected again in the elections of 1850, but also in the years 1859-1862 and 1872–1874. In 1860 he was appointed to the Greek Senate, where he stayed until its abolition in 1864. In 1861 he was appointed prefect of Livadeia.

He died in Athens on 15 January 1884.
