= Konstantinos Papakyritsis =

Greek politician

Konstantinos Papakyritsis (Greek: Κωνσταντίνος Παπακυρίτσης; 1877 – ?) was a Greek politician.

== Biography ==
He was born in Palamas, Karditsa, whose community he became president. He studied in the University of Athens. He was elected MP for Trikala for the first time in the August 1910 Greek legislative election and again in November 1910.
