= Ioannis Deligiannis (1738–1816) =

Ioannis Papagiannopoulos or Ioannis Moragiannis-Deligiannis (1738–1816) was one of the most powerful Proestos (Kodjabashis) of the Peloponnese. He received the nickname "Deligiannis" because of his lively character (Deli= crazy).

== Life ==
He was born in Lagadia, Arcadia. He was the son of Kanellos Papagiannopoulos and Golfo Sintichou. His grandfather, priest Ioannis Litinos, was one of the first settlers of the Pano Mahala of Lagadia.

In 1790, the Turkish nobleman Haseki Aliaga Laliotis, paid a Turk Lagadian to assassinate Ioannis Deligiannis. The Turk was lurking in a Christian house and shot Deligiannis, who happened to be accompanied by only one servant. The bullet hit in the right shoulder blade. His servant managed to kill the Turk, but Deligiannis was seriously injured, as a result of which his right hand was permanently disabled.

Ioannis Deligiannis carried out several projects during his rule. He built two churches in Lagadia (the Church of the Archangels and the Church of Agios Ioannis - both completed in 1808 within 40 days) and a school in 1795. He also built a church in the village of Anaziri.

His attitude is generally characterized by friendly feelings towards the Turks, who often favored the proestoi. He hunted fiercely, together with the Turks, the rest of the Kodjabashi, the thieves and the armatoloi (such as Theodoros Kolokotronis and Athanasios Petimezas), who were now becoming dangerous for the Ottoman power, but also for the interests of the proestoi.

== Death ==
In January 1815, Ioannis Deligiannis fell seriously ill and remained bedridden in his house in Lagadia. He transferred his power to his son Theodorakis. The other proestoi, and especially the son of Sotirakis Londos, Andreas, took advantage of this situation and began to denounce him to the Turks. Thus, on February 12, 1816, by a sultan's firman, Ioannis Deligiannis was beheaded in his house by the Turks. His body was thrown into the garden of the house and his head was taken as a trophy to Siakir Pasha. The blood on the walls of the room where he was murdered was visible until quite recently.

== Family ==
He married Smyrnean Maria Petropoulou and they had the following 11 children: Anagnostis, Georgios, Theodorakis, Anastos, Kanellos, Thanasso, Dimitrakis, Konstantakis, Panagos, Eleni and Nikolakis.
