= Greek legislative election, 1910 =

The term Greek legislative election, 1910 may refer to:

- Greek legislative election, August 1910
- Greek legislative election, November 1910
