= Sotirios Sotiropoulos =

Greek economist and politician (1831–1898)

- Σωτήριος Σωτηρόπουλος
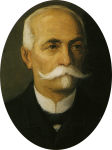

Prime Minister of Greece
- In office 3 May 1893 – 30 October 1893
- Monarch: George I
- Preceded by: Charilaos Trikoupis
- Succeeded by: Charilaos Trikoupis

Personal details
- Born: 1831 Nafplio, Greece
- Died: 1898 (aged 66–67) Athens, Greece
- Party: Independent

Sotirios Sotiropoulos (Greek: Σωτήριος Σωτηρόπουλος; 1831–1898) was a Greek economist and politician who briefly served as Prime Minister of Greece.

== Biography ==
Sotiropoulos was born in Nafplio in 1831. He went to Athens to study law at the University of Athens, but was forced to interrupt his studies due to illness. Instead he turned to his other passion, Economics. In 1853 he was accepted as a tax inspector in the Ministry of Finances, and served in this capacity in various provincial towns. His rise was quick: by 1856 he was department head and soon after general secretary of the Customs Department. From this position he reformed the Customs service and wrote a new set of regulations for it, and suggested other reforms such as the abolition of the tithe. For his services, King Otto awarded him the Silver Cross of the Order of the Redeemer.

Following the ousting of Otto in 1862, Sotiropoulos entered politics, and was elected as a representative for Triphylia in the II National Assembly of 1862–64. He served as Finance Minister in the 1864–65 Konstantinos Kanaris cabinet, and was then nominated for president of the Court of Audit, but refused the post and instead focused on his parliamentary career: he was almost repeatedly re-elected from 1865 to 1895. A supporter of Alexandros Koumoundouros, after the latter's death in 1883, Sotiropoulos served as an independent, criticizing both Charilaos Trikoupis and Theodoros Deligiannis, the two dominant and rival figures of Greek politics after Koumoundouros' death. In the 1887 elections he even led his own group of nine MPs. During this time, he was elected twice Speaker of the Hellenic Parliament, in 1878–79 and 1879–80, and served as Finance Minister in virtually all of Koumoundouros' cabinets (1865, 1870–71, 1875–76, 1880–82) as well as Justice Minister in 1880. His tenure in the Finance Ministry was marked by his personal integrity, a fight against corruption and mismanagement, and an effort to reduce spending and increase revenue.

In May 1893, after the resignation of Trikoupis due to the country's impending default, Sotiropoulos was tapped by King George I to form a government as Prime Minister in co-operation with Dimitrios Rallis. Sotiropoulos held the Finance Ministry as well in this cabinet, but it proved shot-lived as he was forced to resign a few months later. Sotiropoulos died in Athens in 1898.

== Writings ==
In 1866, Sotiropoulos was kidnapped and held by brigands for 36 days before he was ransomed for 60,000 drachmas. He recounted his time with the brigands in his memoir Τριάκοντα εξ ημερών αιχμαλωσία και διαβίωσις μετά των ληστών ("Thirty-six days captivity and life with the brigands"), translated into English as The Brigands of the Morea: A Narrative of the Captivity of Mr. S. Soteropoulos (Saunders, Otley, and Company, 1868).

Political offices
Preceded by Charilaos Trikoupis	Prime Minister of Greece; 3 May - 30 October 1893	Succeeded by Charilaos Trikoupis
Preceded by Nikolaos Papamichalopoulos	Speaker of the Hellenic Parliament; 29 November 1879 – 10 October 1880	Succeeded by Andreas Avgerinos
Preceded by Andreas Avgerinos	Speaker of the Hellenic Parliament; 18 October 1878 – 6 July 1879	Succeeded by Nikolaos Papamichalopoulos
