= 1868 Greek parliamentary election =

- 21 March 1868
Party	Seats
Koumoundouros and Voulgaris supporters	114
Epameinondas Deligiorgis supporters	70
This lists parties that won seats. See the complete results below.
Prime Minister before	Prime Minister after
Dimitrios Voulgaris; French Party	Dimitrios Voulgaris; French Party

Parliamentary elections were held in Greece on 21 March 1868. Supporters of Alexandros Koumoundouros and Dimitrios Voulgaris won a majority of the 184 seats. Voulgaris remained Prime Minister, having assumed office on 6 February.

== Results ==
Party	Seats
Supporters of Koumoundouros and Voulgaris	114
Supporters of Epameinondas Deligiorgis	70
Total	184
Source: Nohlen & Stöver

== Elected Deputies ==
Constituency	Deputies	Faction	Notes
Aegina	Georgios Logiotatidis	Voulgaris	
Aigialeia	Konstantinos Theodorou	Koumoundouros	
Aigialeia	Andreas Michalopoulos		
Andros	Anagnostis Giannoulidis	Deligeorgis	
Andros	Lorentzos Kairis	Voulgaris	
Andros	Petros Kambanis	Voulgaris	
Argos	Andreas Danopoulos	Voulgaris	
Argos	Leonidas Zografos	Voulgaris	
Argos	Nikolaos Tsokris		
Attica	Athanasios Katsandris		
Attica	Panos Koronaios		
Attica	Efstathios Simos	Voulgaris	
Attica	Skarlatos Soutsos		
Attica	Timoleon Filimon		
Chalcis	Avgerinos Averof	Voulgaris	
Chalcis	Vasilios Boudouris	Voulgaris	
Chalcis	Georgios Thomas	Voulgaris	
Chalcis	Konstantinos Petsalis	Zaimis	
Corfu	Dimitrios Kourkoumelis	Voulgaris	
Corfu	Andreas Papadatos	Voulgaris	
Corfu	Athanasios Paramythiotis	Voulgaris	
Corfu Middle	Theodoros Zervos	Koumoundouros	
Corfu Middle	Nikolaos Karydis	Deligeorgis	
Corfu Middle	Nikolaos Pangratis		
Corfu Mountains	Polychronis Konstantas	Deligeorgis	
Corfu Mountains	Nikolaos Louvros	Koumoundouros	
Corfu Mountains	Theodoros Romaios	Koumoundouros	
Corinthia	Sotirios Ioannou	Voulgaris	
Corinthia	Georgios Koustas	Voulgaris	
Corinthia	Andreas Notaras	Koumoundouros	
Corinthia	Spyridon Notaras		
Corinthia	Efstathios Ikonomopoulos	Koumoundouros	
Dorida	Ioannis Andritsou	Voulgaris	
Dorida	Nikolaos Katsikapis		
Dorida	Georgios Papathanasiou		
Elis	Andreas Avgerinos	Zaimis	
Elis	Themistoklis Daralexis		
Elis	Epaminondas Krestenitis	Koumoundouros	
Elis	Lykourgos Krestenitis	Koumoundouros	
Elis	Antonios Petralias	Voulgaris	
Epidavros Limira	Nikolaos Papamichalopoulos	Voulgaris	
Epidavros Limira	Nikolaos Ritsos		
Ermionida	Kyriakos Goulemas	Voulgaris	
Ermionida	Andreas Zervas	Voulgaris	
Evrytania	Efthymios Gouvelis	Voulgaris	
Evrytania	Panos Manolidis		
Evrytania	Ioannis Blatsis	Voulgaris	
Evrytania	Dimitrios Tsitsaras	Voulgaris	
Gortynia	Petros Deligiannis	Voulgaris	
Gortynia	Athanasios Kalpakidis	Voulgaris	
Gortynia	Theodoros Kolokotronis		
Gortynia	Efst. Malliaropoulos	Voulgaris	
Gortynia	Vasilios Nikolopoulos	Voulgaris	
Gortynia	Georgios Plapoutas	Koumoundouros	
Gytheio	Konstantinos Kosonakos		
Gytheio	Leonidas Petropoulakis	Voulgaris	
Hydra	Dimitrios Voulgaris	Voulgaris	
Hydra	Theodoros Gikas	Voulgaris	
Hydra	Ioannis Kalogiannis	Voulgaris	
Ithaca	Panagiotis Kokkinis		
Ithaca	Markos Paizis	Voulgaris	
Kalamai	Konstantinos Dagres	Zaimis	
Kalamai	Periklis Mavromichalis	Voulgaris	
Kalamai	Ioannis Flessas	Voulgaris	
Kalavryta	Thrasyvoulos Zaimis	Zaimis	
Kalavryta	Athanasios G. Petimezas		
Kalavryta	Leonidas Petimezas	Voulgaris	
Kalavryta	Sotirios N. Petimezas	Voulgaris	
Kalavryta	Ioannis Sofianopoulos		
Karystia	Konstantinos Dimitriadis	Voulgaris	
Karystia	Georgios Karavas	Voulgaris	
Karystia	Dimitrios Lenosis		
Karystia	Georgios Papageorgiou	Voulgaris	
Kea	Triantafyllos Lazaretos	Voulgaris	
Kea	Dimitrios Stathopoulos	Voulgaris	
Kranaia	Dimitrios Davis		
Kranaia	Dimitrios Karousos	Voulgaris	
Kranaia	Agamemnon Metaxas		
Kranaia	Iosif Momferatos		
Kynouria	Dimitrios Apostolidis		
Kynouria	Georgios Vakalopoulos		
Kynouria	Theodoros Thermogiannis		
Kynouria	Nikolaos Chatzipanagiotou	Voulgaris	
Kythira	Georgios Aronis-Panagiotopoulos	Koumoundouros	
Kythira	Th. Kasimatis-Aloizos	Voulgaris	
Kythira	Kosmas Panaretos		
Lacedaemon	Ioannis Valassopoulos		
Lacedaemon	Dimitrios Dimitrakakis		
Lacedaemon	Spyridon Kopanitsas		
Lacedaemon	Nikolaos Leopoulos		
Lacedaemon	Meletios Meletopoulos		
Lefkada	Aristotelis Valaoritis		
Lefkada	Spyridon Valaoritis	Voulgaris	
Lefkada	Gerasimos Servos		
Livadeia	Antonios Georgantas	Voulgaris	
Livadeia	Vasilios Spyropoulos		
Locris	Alexandros Dosios		
Locris	Aristidis Roukis	Voulgaris	
Mantineia	Panagiotis Varvoglis	Voulgaris	
Mantineia	Vasilios Dimitrakopoulos	Voulgaris	
Mantineia	Dimitrios Zengelis	Voulgaris	
Mantineia	Ioannis Papazafiropoulos	Voulgaris	
Mantineia	Ioannis Tambakopoulos	Voulgaris	
Megalopoli	Athanasios Katrivanos		
Megalopoli	Ilias Flessas	Voulgaris	
Megaris	Alexandros Vassos	Voulgaris	
Megaris	Georgios Maleas		
Messini	Spilios Antonopoulos		
Messini	Konstantinos Lymberopoulos	Voulgaris	
Messini	Anagnostis Nikolaidis	Voulgaris	
Milos	Lambros Apergis	Voulgaris	
Milos	Ioannis Provelengios		
Missolonghi	Epaminondas Deligeorgis	Deligeorgis	
Missolonghi	Stamos Makris		
Nafpaktia	Nikolaos Kalantzopoulos	Voulgaris	
Nafpaktia	Efthymios Plastiras	Voulgaris	
Nafpaktia	Athanasios Rontiris		
Nafplia	Konstantinos Efthymiopoulos	Voulgaris	
Nafplia	Georgios Iatros		
Naxos	Konstantinos Krispis	Voulgaris	
Naxos	Emmanouil Nafpliotis	Voulgaris	
Naxos	Nikolaos Chatzopoulos		
Oitylo	Ioannis Katsakos		
Oitylo	Antonis A. Mavromichalis	Deligeorgis	
Oitylo	Xanthos Pikoulakis		
Oitylo	Dimitrios Saravas	Zaimis	
Olympia	Zarifis Zarifopoulos	Voulgaris	
Olympia	Charalambos Kanellopoulos		
Olympia	Konstantinos Ikonomopoulos	Voulgaris	
Pali	Georgios Typaldos-Iakovatos		
Pali	Charalambos Typaldos-Iakovatos		
Pali	Marinos Charitatos		
Parnassida	Loukas Karalivanos		
Parnassida	Efthymios Kechagias	Koumoundouros	
Parnassida	P. Papakostas-Tzamalas		
Patron	Ioannis Antonopoulos	Voulgaris	
Patron	Efstathios Iliopoulos		
Patron	Athanasios Kanakaris-Roufos	Zaimis	
Patron	Dimitrios Patrinos	Voulgaris	
Paxoi	Georgios Kangas	Voulgaris	
Phthiotis	Alexandros Valatsos	Voulgaris	
Phthiotis	Georgios Velentzas	Voulgaris	
Phthiotis	Konstantinos Diovouniotis	Voulgaris	
Phthiotis	Themistoklis Papakostas		
Nea Psara	Nikolaos Angelikaras		
Nea Psara	Nikolaos Kanaris	Voulgaris	
Pylia	Dimitrios Tringetas		
Pylia	Nikolaos Tsiklitiras	Voulgaris	
Sami	Georgios Dellaportas	Voulgaris	
Sami	Ioannis Destounis	Voulgaris	
Sami	Evangelos Rodotheatos	Voulgaris	
Skopelos	Konstantinos Epifaniou		
Skopelos	Nikolaos Nikolaidis	Voulgaris	
Spetses	Anargyros Chatzianargyrou		
Spetses	Nikolaos Goudis		
Syros	Ioannis Veakis	Voulgaris	
Syros	Aristidis Glarakis	Voulgaris	
Syros	Miltiadis Kanaris	Deligeorgis	
Syros	Konstantinos Platys	Deligeorgis	
Thebes	Ioannis Klimakas	Voulgaris	
Thira	Gasparis Delendas	Voulgaris	
Thira	Georgios Diamantis	Voulgaris	
Thira	Petros Zanos	Deligeorgis	
Thira	Antonios Langadas	Voulgaris	
Thira	Spyromilios		
Tinos	Dimitrios Drosos	Voulgaris	
Tinos	Ioannis Zallonis	Voulgaris	
Tinos	Iakovos Paximadis	Koumoundouros	
Trichonida	Vasilios Vasilopoulos	Voulgaris	
Trichonida	Georgios Staikos		
Trifylia	Theodoros Anastasopoulos	Voulgaris	
Trifylia	Dimitrios Poniropoulos		
Trifylia	Sotirios Sotiropoulos	Koumoundouros	
Troizinia	Spyridon Karamanos	Koumoundouros	
Troizinia	Stamatios Korizis	Koumoundouros	
Valtos	Athanasios Iskos		
Valtos	Ioannis Karagiannopoulos		
Vonitsa-Xiromero	Dimitrios Grivas		
Vonitsa-Xiromero	Tatselos Mavrommatis		
Vonitsa-Xiromero	Athanasios Monastiriotis	Voulgaris	
Xirochori	Athanasios Petsalis		
Xirochori	Tilemachos Roukis	Voulgaris	
Zakynthos	Ioannis Varkas-Soulis		election annulled
Zakynthos	A. Gouskos		election annulled
Zakynthos	Spyridon Leontarakis	Koumoundouros	election annulled
Zakynthos	Konstantinos Lomvardos	Koumoundouros	election annulled
Zakynthos	Andreas Foskardis-Gaitas	Koumoundouros	election annulled
