= Panagos Deligiannis =

Greek politician (1788–1839)

- Born: Panagiotis Deligiannis; 1788; Langadia, Arcadia, Greece
- Died: 1839 (aged 50–51); Nafplio, Greece
- Other name: Papagiannopoulos
- Spouse: Eleni Michalopoulou
- Children: 5, including Theodoros
- Father: Ioannis Deligiannis

Panagiotis "Panagos" Deligiannis or Papagiannopoulos (1788-1839), was born in Lagadia, Arcadia and was the ninth child of the proestos, Ioannis Deligiannis.

== Biography ==
He was educated as he studied at the "Academy" of Lagadia. He was solely responsible for managing the family's finances and kept the family correspondence. He took part in the Greek War of Independence as a Filikos.

After the struggle he served in various positions: governor of Gastouni (1832), prefect of Elis (1833) and finally governor of Elis (1836). From 1837 to 1838, he was governor of Corinth. He then fled to Nafplio where he died poor a year later, in 1839.

== Family ==
He married Eleni Michalopoulou and they had five children:

- Maria Deligianni (1822-?)
- Theodoros Deligiannis (1826-1905), Prime Minister of Greece
- Nikolaos Deligiannis (1831-1890), Supreme judge
- Konstantinos Deligiannis (1833-1898), Medical scientist and university professor
- Kalliroi Deligianni (1834-?)
