= Filippos Petsalnikos =

Greek politician (1950–2020)

- Φίλιππος Πετσάλνικος
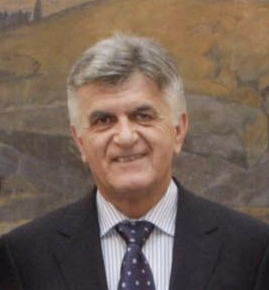
- Petsalnikos in 2010

8th Speaker of the Hellenic Parliament
- In office 15 October 2009 – 11 April 2012
- President: Karolos Papoulias
- Preceded by: Dimitris Sioufas
- Succeeded by: Vyron Polydoras

Deputy Speaker of the Hellenic Parliament
- In office 19 March 2004 – 14 October 2009
- Speaker: Anna Psarouda-Benaki; Dimitris Sioufas

Minister of Justice
- In office 24 October 2001 – 10 March 2004
- Prime Minister: Costas Simitis
- Preceded by: Michael Stathopoulos
- Succeeded by: Anastasios Papaligouras

Minister of Public Order
- In office 30 October 1998 – 19 February 1999
- Prime Minister: Costas Simitis
- Preceded by: Georgios Romeos
- Succeeded by: Michalis Chrysohoidis

Minister of Macedonia-Thrace
- In office 22 October 1996 – 30 October 1998
- Prime Minister: Costas Simitis
- Preceded by: Constantinos Triaridis
- Succeeded by: Giannis Magriotis

Personal details
- Born: 1 December 1950 Mavrochori, Greece
- Died: 13 March 2020 (aged 69)
- Party: Movement of Democratic Socialists (since 2015), PASOK (until 2015)
- Spouse: Mariele Biedendieck
- Children: Alexandros; Danae; Electra
- Education: University of Thessaloniki; University of Bonn
- Profession: Attorney
- Website: www.petsalnikos.gr

Filippos Petsalnikos (Greek: Φίλιππος Πετσάλνικος; 1 December 1950 – 13 March 2020) was a Greek politician of the Movement of Democratic Socialists. From 2009 to 2012, he served as Speaker of the Hellenic Parliament. Before, he was a Member of the Hellenic Parliament from 1985 to 2012.

== Life ==
Born in Mavrochori, Kastoria, Petsalnikos studied law in Greece and Germany.

=== Political career ===
In 1985, he was elected for the first time as an MP for the Panhellenic Socialist Movement (PASOK).

He served as the Minister for Macedonia-Thrace between 22 October 1996 and 30 October 1998, the Minister of Public Order between 30 October 1998 and 19 February 1999. Petsalnikos resigned in the aftermath of the Abdullah Öcalan's capture. Later he acted as the Minister of Justice between 24 October 2001 and 10 March 2004. He was elected to the position of Speaker on 15 October 2009 by 168 of the Parliament's 300 MPs.

On 3 January 2015, it was announced that Petsalnikos would join former prime minister Papandreou in leaving PASOK to found the new Movement of Democratic Socialists.

=== Personal life ===
He was married and had three children. Petsalnikos spoke Greek, English and German. His wife is an attorney and supports (2005) DKIZ, which is (2011) a selfhelp-organisation run by and for German speaking women in Greece.

Political offices
Preceded by Constantinos Triaridis	Minister of Macedonia-Thrace; 1996–1998	Succeeded by Giannis Magriotis
Preceded by Georgios Romeos	Minister of Public Order; 1998–1999	Succeeded by Michalis Chrysohoidis
Preceded by Michael Stathopoulos	Minister of Justice; 2001–2004	Succeeded by Anastasios Papaligouras
Preceded by Dimitris Sioufas	Speaker of the Hellenic Parliament; 2009–2012	Succeeded by Vyron Polydoras
