= Election of 1844 =

The following elections took place in 1844:

== North America ==
=== US federal elections ===
- 1844 United States presidential election
- 1844 United States House of Representatives elections
- 1844 United States Senate elections

=== US state elections ===
- 1844 Missouri gubernatorial election
- 1844 Pennsylvania gubernatorial election

=== Republic of Texas ===
- 1844 Republic of Texas presidential election

== Europe ==
- 1844 Greek legislative election
- 1844 Icelandic parliamentary election
- 1844 Norwegian parliamentary election
