= 1850 Greek parliamentary election =

← 1847	20 October 1850	1853 →
Party	Leader	Seats
Kriezis supporters	Antonios Kriezis	100
Independents	–	31
This lists parties that won seats. See the complete results below.
Prime Minister before	Prime Minister after
Konstantinos Kanaris	Antonios Kriezis

Parliamentary elections were held in Greece on 20 October 1850. Supporters of Antonios Kriezis won a majority of the 131 seats. Kriezis remained Prime Minister.

== Results ==
Party	Seats
Supporters of Antonios Kriezis	100
Independents	31
Total	131
Source: Nohlen & Stöver
