= Konstantinos Triaridis =

Greek politician

Konstantinos Triaridis Κωνσταντίνος Τριαρίδης

Minister for Macedonia-Thrace
- In office 13 October 1993 – 22 October 1996
- Preceded by: Panayiotis Chatzinikolaou
- Succeeded by: Philippos Petsalnikos

Personal details
- Born: 15 May 1937 Kilkis, Greece
- Died: 27 June 2012 (aged 75) Thessaloniki, Greece
- Party: Panhellenic Socialist Movement
- Profession: Academic (Professor of Surgery)

Konstantinos Triaridis (Greek: Κωνσταντίνος Τριαρίδης; 15 May 1937 – 27 June 2012) was a Greek politician who served as Minister for Macedonia-Thrace from 1993 to 1996.

Political offices
Preceded by Panayiotis Chatzinikolaou	Minister of Macedonia-Thrace; 1993–1996	Succeeded by Philippos Petsalnikos
