= Lefkochori, Arcadia =

Mountain village and community in southern Greece

Lefkochori Λευκοχώρι
- Community
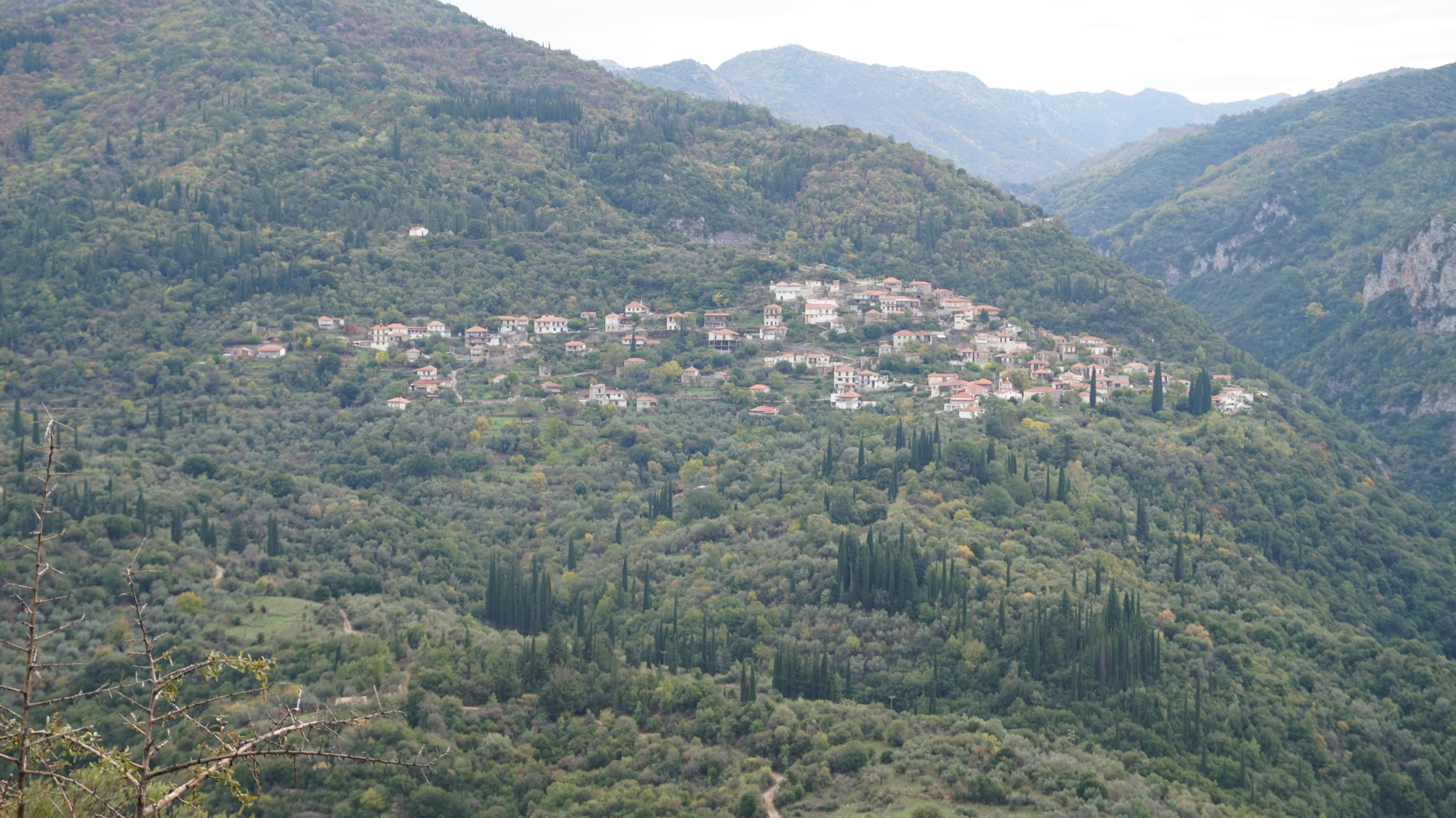

- Location within Greece
- Coordinates: 37°41′31″N 21°58′37″E
- Country: Greece
- Administrative region: Peloponnese
- Regional unit: Arcadia
- Municipality: Gortynia
- Municipal unit: Lagkadia

Population (2021)
  - Community: 96
- Time zone: UTC+2 (EET)
  - Summer (DST): UTC+3 (EEST)

Lefkochori (Greek: Λευκοχώρι) is a mountain village and community in the municipal unit of Lagkadia in the municipality of Gortynia, in Arcadia, southern Greece. It is 5 km west of the village Lagkadia. It is considered a traditional settlement.

== See also ==
- List of settlements in Arcadia
- List of traditional settlements of Greece
