= Anagnostis Deligiannis =

Greek politician (1771–1857)

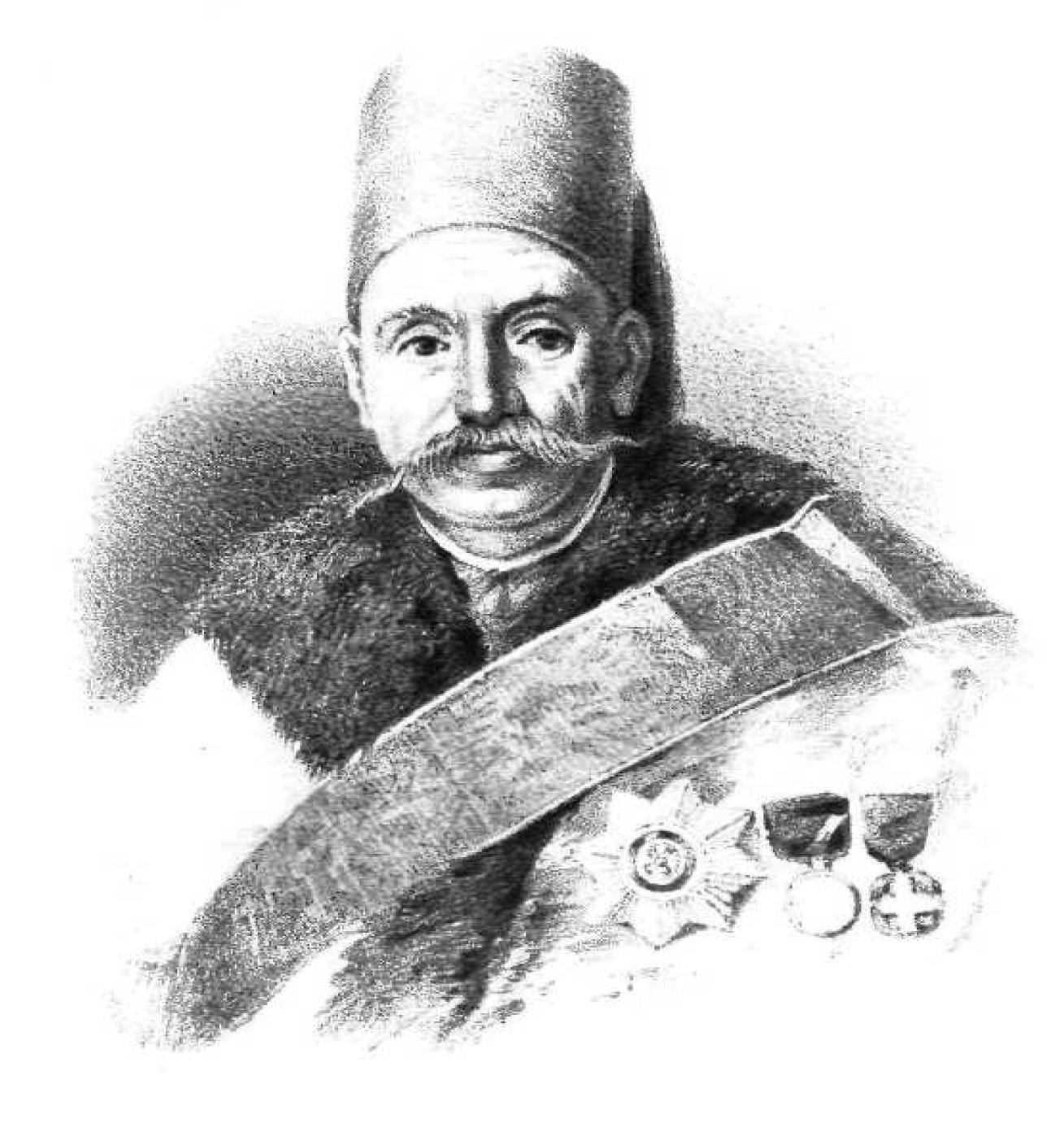
- Born: 1771; Langadia, Arcadia, Peloponnese, Ottoman Empire
- Died: 1857 (~ aged 86); Athens, Attica, Kingdom of Greece
- Occupations: Landowner, income earner, politician

Anagnostis (Sofianos) Deligiannis-Papagiannopoulos (1771-1857) was the firstborn son of the Proestos of the Peloponnese, Ioannis Deligiannis.

== Biography ==
In 1800 he was appointed vekilis (representative) in Constantinople, where he acquired enormous power. However, with the beginning of the Greek War of Independence, he went down to the Peloponnese. He became a member of the Senate in the Kaltetzes Act and opposed, along with the other candidates, the plan of Demetrios Ypsilantis to place the Revolution under a single military and political leadership, provoking the beginning of the Civil War.

During the First National Assembly he was appointed a member of the Executive and later became involved in the civil conflicts. With the dominance of the government faction, he was imprisoned together with his brothers in Hydra.

With the end of the civil war, he was elected a member of the "Administrative Committee of Greece" by the Third National Assembly and later, after settling in Nafplio, he opposed the Kapodistrian government. Then, he went to Athens where he became president of the Senate in 1851.

== Family ==
He married Smaragda Tabakopoulou with whom he had 4 children included:

- Petros Deligiannis (1812-1872), politician
  - Nikolaos Deligiannis (1845-1910), Prime Minister of Greece
