= Dimitris Sioufas =

Greek lawyer and politician (1944–2019)

- Δημήτρης Σιούφας
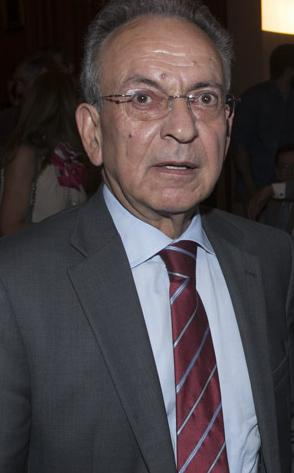
- Sioufas in 2016

7th Speaker of the Hellenic Parliament
- In office 27 September 2007 – 15 October 2009
- President: Karolos Papoulias
- Preceded by: Anna Benaki-Psarouda
- Succeeded by: Philippos Petsalnikos

Personal details
- Born: 15 August 1944 Ellinopyrgos, Karditsa, Greece
- Died: 11 January 2019 (aged 74) Athens, Greece
- Party: New Democracy

Dimitris Sioufas (Greek: Δημήτρης Σιούφας; 15 August 1944 – 11 January 2019) was a Greek lawyer and New Democracy politician.

== Early life ==
Born in Ellinopyrgos, Karditsa, Sioufas received a degree in political science and public administration at the Panteion University of Athens as well as in law from the University of Thessaloniki.

He was first elected to the Greek Parliament for the Karditsa constituency in the 1981 general election, and has been reelected at every election since. He was Deputy Minister of Social Security from August 1991 to December 1992 and Minister of Health, Welfare and Social Services from December 1992 to October 1993. Following the 2004 parliamentary election, which was won by New Democracy, Sioufas became Minister for Development in the government of Prime Minister Kostas Karamanlis on 10 March 2004. He left this position when a new government was sworn in on 19 September 2007 and was instead nominated as Speaker of Parliament.

Sioufas has been a member of New Democracy's Central Committee since 1997; previously he was a member of the Central Committee from 1979 to 1985 and from 1994 to 1997. He was also a member of the party's Executive Committee from 1997 to 2001 and a member of its Political Council from 2001 to March 2004. From April 2000 to March 2004, he was Secretary General of the New Democracy Parliamentary Group.

Sioufas married Kaity Anagnostaki and had two sons and a daughter.

Political offices
| Preceded by Giorgios Souflias | Minister of Health, Welfare and Social Services; 1992–1993 | Succeeded by Dimitris Kremastinos |
| Preceded by Akis Tsochatzopoulos | Minister for Development; 2004–2007 | Succeeded by Christos Folias |
| Preceded by Anna Benaki-Psarouda | Speaker of the Hellenic Parliament; 2007–2009 | Succeeded by Filippos Petsalnikos |
