= Georgios Romeos =

Greek writer and politician (1934–2023)

Member of the European Parliament
- In office 24 July 1984 – 13 October 1993
- Constituency: Greece

Minister of Public Order
- In office 25 September 1996 – 30 October 1998
- Preceded by: Kostas Mpeis
- Succeeded by: Filippos Petsalnikos

Personal details
- Born: 14 April 1934 Pagoi, Greece
- Died: 24 February 2023 (aged 88) Athens, Greece
- Party: PASOK
- Education: Supreme School of Economics and Business
- Occupation: Writer

Georgios Romeos (Greek: Γεώργιος Ρωμαίος; 14 April 1934 – 24 February 2023) was a Greek writer and politician. A member of PASOK, he served as a Member of the European Parliament from 1984 to 1993.

Romeos died in Athens on 24 February 2023, at the age of 88.
