= 1844 Greek parliamentary election =

← 1843	June–August 1844	1847 →
Party	Leader	Seats
Russian Party	Andreas Metaxas	55
English Party	Alexandros Mavrokordatos	28
French Party	Ioannis Kolettis	20
Independents	–	24
This lists parties that won seats. See the complete results below.
Prime Minister before	Prime Minister after
Alexandros Mavrokordatos; English Party	Ioannis Kolettis; French Party

Parliamentary elections were held in Greece between June and August 1844. Supporters of Andreas Metaxas emerged as the largest block in Parliament. However, Ioannis Kolettis became Prime Minister on 18 August.

== Background ==
During and after the Greek War of Independence (1821–29), a series of elections for national assemblies had taken place, and promulgated a series of liberal constitutions that enshrined democratic principles. Nevertheless, the Kingdom of Greece, established in 1832 under the Bavarian prince Otto, disregarded the existence of the 1832 Constitution passed by the Fifth National Assembly. From 1832 until 1835, the kingdom was ruled by a Bavarian regency, and after that by Otto as an absolute monarchy.

This situation lasted until the 3 September 1843 Revolution, when an uprising by the garrison and populace of Athens forced King Otto to concede elections for a constitutional assembly. The election was held on 17 September for the "Third of September National Assembly of the Greeks at Athens", and the new assembly promulgated the Greek Constitution of 1844 in February, after which it was dissolved and new elections proclaimed.

== Electoral system ==
The 1844 election was held by the Electoral Law of 18 March 1844, stipulating universal male suffrage over 25 years of age. Each of the Provinces of Greece was a separate constituency, and MPs were allocated by population: provinces with up to 10,000 inhabitants elected one MP, with up to 20,000 two, with up to 30,000 three, and over that four. In addition, the three islands that played a major role in the War of Independence, Hydra, Spetses and Psara—the latter still part of the Ottoman Empire and represented by the inhabitants who had fled to mainland Greece after the Destruction of Psara—exceptionally received the right to send MPs of their own, three for Hydra, and two for the other two islands. The professors of the University of Athens also elected one MP.

The electoral process lasted for six months, with various constituencies voting at different times from May (Old Calendar) until August. The whole process was dominated by bribery, violence and efforts to falsify the results. Ioannis Kolettis and his French Party came third, but formed the new government in coalition with the Russian Party. The new parliament convened for the first time in January 1845.

== Results ==
Party	Seats
Russian Party	55
English Party	28
French Party	20
Independents	24
Total	127
Source: Nohlen & Stöver
