= Linos Benakis =

Greek university professor (1928–2022)

Linos G. Benakis (Greek: Λίνος Γ. Μπενάκης; 31 January 1928 – 12 October 2022) was a Greek historian of philosophy, professor and researcher. He was married to the law professor, politician and academician Anna Psarouda-Benaki.

== Early life and education ==
Benakis was born in Corfu on 31 January 1928. He received general education in the First Gymnasium of Thessaloniki. Then he studied at the University of Thessaloniki (1946–1950), and with a scholarship from the Greek National Scholarships Foundation, at the university of Cologne (1957–1960), where he was nominated Doctor of Philosophy. He was a student of professors Ioannis Kakridis, Stylianos Kapsomenos, Nicos Andriotis, Agapitos Tsopanakis, Charalambos Gieros and Linos Politis; at the University of Cologne he attended the courses and seminars in the history of philosophy by Paul Wilpert, who was his thesis supervisor. His supervisor of studies from Greece was Basil Tatakis. Yet, he received a scholarship from the Alexander von Humboldt Foundation, and remained four years in Preveza and Athens as secondary school teacher. The subject of his thesis was "Studies on the Commentaries of Michael Psellos" from which his first publications in German were influenced.

== Research activity ==
From 1966, he was an associate of the "Centre for the Research of Greek Philosophy of the Academy of Athens", of which he became director in 1971. He was responsible for the edition of the volumes of the scientific journal "Philosophy", where he published some of his most important studies. When the journal launched, an innovative, dynamic and competent philosophical thought appeared in Greece. In the early volumes of this journal, the Generation of the 1930s, including Ioannis Theodorakopoulos, Panagiotis Kanellopoulos and Konstantinos Tsatsos, also involved in the editorial board of the magazine, met with the new generation of Greek philosophers of the 1960s. A later view of Linos Benakis as regards that era, is that if the Generation of the 1930s had completed its course, it could have the opportunity, due to the political and social conditions, as well as the international developments, to proceed in a Greek renaissance of the real and scientific life. In his books and articles Linos Benakis deals with subjects relating to ancient Greek, postclassical, Byzantine and modern Greek philosophy. In the 1970s he continued the research activities and prepared a bibliography of works on the Byzantine philosophy, which he added to the Greek translation of Basil Tatakis's major work “Byzantine Philosophy”, of which he was the editor. He continued the research activity ever since. From 1983, as a Research Fellow of the Academy of Athens, he took over the direction of both series of critical editions, the "Byzantine Philosophy" and the "Byzantine Commentaries on Aristotle", issued by the Academy of Athens under the auspices of the International Society of Academies. In the latter series, in 2009 (Vol. 5) he published the work "Michael Psellos’ Comments on Aristotle’s Physics", with an extensive introduction in German, standard ancient text and extensive bibliography.

== His work ==
=== Continuation and foundation of the study of Byzantine philosophy ===
The influence of Tatakis’ and Wilpert's works exists in the beginning of Linos Benakis’ journey. The initial interest in the philosophy of Aristotle and its continuity in Byzantine philosophy is included in his effort to continue the study of Byzantine philosophy, and led to its foundation and the recognition of its autonomy as a discipline. He gave much emphasis to its particular characteristics, which are linked to the historical conditions of its development, in order to establish a longitudinal corpus of knowledge. To accomplish this task it was necessary to launch a critical edition and publication of unpublished and unknown texts of Byzantine philosophy. Benakis' ultimate goal is the canonical texts of Byzantine Philosophy to be shaped, as is the case for the other Western scientific disciplines. Thus, under the supervision of Linos Benakis a variety of researchers worked, so that the literary and philosophical work of Byzantine philosophers to emerge, such as: Michael Psellos, Nicholaos Methonis, Nikephoros Blemmydes, George Pachymeres, Manuel Olovolos, Prochoros Cydones, Barlaam of Seminara, Theophanes of Nicaea, Demetrios Kydones, Gemistus Pletho. Along with this project, the works of Byzantine commentators of Aristotle, such as Arethas of Caesarea, Michael Psellos, and George Pachymeres were presented. Both these series, in addition to the critical edition of texts, contain introduction and translation into European languages, with interpretive and philosophical commentaries. So, gradually, the missing link of Greek philosophy, as appeared in the Byzantine period, restored, and some overlooked works and forms of Greek spirituality of the past came to light.

The great contribution of Linos Benakis in the founding of the study of Byzantine philosophy revolves around three axes: a) the presentation of the research of the issues to be examined, b) the analysis and highlighting of important points of the Byzantine worldview, and c) a thorough historical-philosophical approach, with a summary of its results. In this way, the Byzantine philosophical thinking that emerged, at the same time it was included in a broader field of spiritual production. Benakis introduced the intertextuality in the study of Byzantine philosophy, by establishing a network of references, and revealing its structural reality in a long-term historical development. The aim was to distinguish the common sense and the conventions of the texts, and by their interpretation to find their internal connotations. In other words, he provided a basis for raising a solid edifice of knowledge and defined its future course.

=== Historical-critical method ===
The method which Linos Benakis employs was characterized as historical-critical, backed by scrupulous textual verification and examination of the content of other scholars’ findings, arriving eventually at a consistent interpretation of philosophical thought, in direct or indirect relation to the question arises every time. Thus, he opened up a new prospect of delving into history, making this later accessible by placing it at the proper distance so as to be considered as objectively and rationally as possible. The historical-critical method was used both for the critical edition or reedition of texts and for highlighting the peculiarity that the Byzantine philosophical thought was in the long tradition of Greece.

== Academic teaching, organizations, conferences, and awards ==
In 1984 Linos Benakis taught at the Princeton University in the United States, while in 1987-88 he was a visiting professor at the University of Crete (Rethymnon), in which he will teach again in the 2000s (decade). Also, during the period 1990–1994, he was vice president of the Ionian University in Corfu. The important contribution of Linos Benakis’ work in the History of Philosophy quickly gained wide recognition and acceptance by the scientific community. So he was elected member of the Board of the "International Society for the Study of Medieval Philosophy" for ten years (1982–1992) and he was chairman of the "Byzantine Philosophy Committee" of the same Society. In 1983 as a fellow of the Academy of Athens he became in charge of the "Elli Lambridi Philosophical Library". He participated in many symposia and conferences, and he has been a key organizer of several of them. Among the latter, the Symposium on "The Neoplatonism and Medieval Philosophy" in October 1995 in Corfu and the "Symposium on Byzantine Philosophy" held in 1997 on the occasion of the celebration of Thessaloniki as the cultural capital of Europe were very significant. On December 13, 1995, he was awarded the title of Honorary Doctor of the Department of Psychology, Education and Philosophy at the University of Ioannina, and the same year he founded the "Working Group for the Study of Byzantine philosophy in Greece", which brings together many research scholars from all the Greek territory. He is a member of numerous organizations with scientific and humanitarian purposes, and participates in the editorial boards of international journals, such as the "Medieval Philosophy and Theology", "European Journal of Science and Theology" etc. In a speech in the Meeting of the Academy of Athens on December 7, 2010, on the "Cultural roots of Europe", on the occasion of the book by the French Professor Sylvain Gouguenheim, "Aristotle at Mont-Saint-Michel: The Greek roots of Christian Europe", he endorsed the author's views, which received negative criticism by islamophiles, and referred to the contribution of Greek Byzantium in the spread of Aristotelianism in the West.

The Hellenic Ministry of Culture and Sports awarded Linos Benakis the State Prize for Literary Translation 2013, Translation from the Ancient Greek into Modern Greek Literature, for the book "Iamblichus, the Exhortation to Philosophy" published by the Academy of Athens.

The Society of Friends of Panayiotis Kanellopoulos at its event on February 22, 2017, in the Athens Club declared its former chairman, Linos Benakis, Honorary President to honor his long-term contribution. The main speaker of the banquet was Nikos Dendias, former minister and member of parliament Athens B.

== Personal life and death ==
Benakis died in Athens on 12 October 2022, at the age of 94.

== Bibliography ==
- Post-Byzantine philosophy of the 17th–19th centuries. Research in the sources. Ed. Parousia, Athens 2001, 255 pp.
- Texts and Studies on Byzantine Philosophy. Ed. Parousia, Athens 2002, 717 pp.
- Ancient Greek Philosophy. Historiography and Research Publications. Ed. Parousia, Athens 2004, 334 pp.
- Memory of Five Philosophers. I.N.Theodorakopoulos (1900-1981), P. K. Kanellopoulos (1902-1986), K. D. Tsatsos (1899-1987), E. P. Papanoutsos (1900-1982), B. N. Tatakis (1987-1986). Texts for the Five Philosophers. Biographical Notes and Complete List of their Works. Ed. Parousia, Athens 2006, 231 pp.
- Michael Psellos: Kommentar zur Physik des Aristoteles. Editio princeps. Einleitung, Text, Indices. Corpus Philosophorum Medii Aevi, Commentaria in Aristotelem Byzantina 5. Academy of Athens, Athens 2008, ΙΧ-94-450 pp.
- Iamblichus, the Exhortation to Philosophy. Including also the Protreptic of Aristotle the Pythagorean Symbols and the Anonymous Sophist of the 5th Century. Introduction, ancient text, translation in Greek and interpretative notes. Centre for the Research of Greek Philosophy, Academy of Athens, Athens 2012, 296 pp.
- Byzantine Philosophy B. Ed. Parousia, Athens 2013, 544 pp.
- Theodore of Smyrna: Epitome of Nature and Natural Principles According to the Ancients. Editio princeps. Introduction - Text - Indices. Corpus Philosophorum Medii Aevi, Βυζαντινοί Φιλόσοφοι - Philosophi Byzantini 12. Academy of Athens, Athens 2013, 33*+77 pp.
- Byzantine Philosophy - An Introductory Approach, Lambert Academic Publishing (LAP), Saarbrücken 2017, 104 pp. ISBN 978-3-330-03021-3.
- Filosofia bizantina. Una visión introductoria, trad. Ana María Martín Vico - Ricardo Rodríguez-Parejo, Centro de Estudios Bizantinos, Neogriegos y Chipriotas, Granada 2020, 128 pp. ISBN 978-84-121502-0-9.
