= Dimitrakis Deligiannis =

Greek soldier (1783–1848)

Dimitrakis Deligiannis (Greek: Δημητράκης Δεληγιάννης; c. 1783 – 1848) was a fighter of the Greek War of Independence of 1821 from Arcadia, Greece.

== Biography ==
Dimitrakis Deligiannis was born in about 1783 in Lagadia in Arcadia in the Peloponnese, and was the son of the important provost Ioannis Deligiannis who was killed before the revolution by the Ottoman authorities with the sultan's firman. He was a member of Filiki Eteria and at the beginning of the Greek revolution, he actively participated along with the rest of his brothers. He took part in the general massacre of the Ottoman inhabitants of Lagadia who had been disarmed a long time earlier by the forces of his brother Kanellos and in the expedition that led to the downfall of the strong Ottoman stronghold of Lalas. He was then actively involved in the decisive battle during the siege of Tripolitsa, the battle of Grana, and a few days later he proceeded with 500 men to occupy the village of Mantzagra, near Tripolitsa. During the fall of the city, Deligiannis entered it from the parapet of Seragio before heading to Patras where he participated in the siege of the city.

In 1822, he participated in the attempt to repel the expedition of Dramalis, fighting, among other places, in Agionori. For his contribution, he was promoted to the rank of lieutenant general on January 22, 1823. During the civil war, Dimitrakis Deligiannis sided with the Koundouriotis government. After the defeat of the side he supported, he surrendered together with the rest of his brothers at the beginning of February 1825 in Nafplio and was imprisoned in Ydra. He was later released and took part in operations against Ibrahim Pasha's Egyptian army. In 1825 Deligiannis fought as a commander in the unsuccessful battle of Trambala, and in July he carried out various ambushes against the enemy forces in Dervenia Leontari. He fought in Piana and at the beginning of 1826 in a victorious battle between the villages of Zevgolatio and Agiannis.

Deligiannis was promoted to the rank of general and after the liberation, he settled in Lagadia where he died in 1848.

Deligiannis and his wife Stathoula had a son Ioannis, who became a politician and served as a government minister in 1874–76.

== Bibliography ==
- Apostolos E. Vakalopoulos, Ιστορία του Νέου Ελληνισμού, τόμος ΣΤ, Thessaloniki 1982
- Photios Chrysanthopoulos, Βίοι Πελοποννησίων ανδρών και των εξώθεν εις την Πελοπόννησον ελθόντων κληρικών, στρατιωτικών και πολιτικών των αγωνισαμένων τον αγώνα της επαναστάσεως. Athens: Stavros Andropoulos, 1888
- Dionysios Kokkinos, Η Ελληνική Επανάστασις. Athens: Editions Melissa, 1974
- Eftychia Liata, Αρχείο της Οικογένειας Δεληγιάννη, Εταιρεία των Φίλων του Λαού- Ιστορικόν Αρχείον, Athens 1992
