= Anna Benaki-Psarouda =

Greek lawyer and politician (1934–2026)

- Άννα Μπενάκη-Ψαρούδα
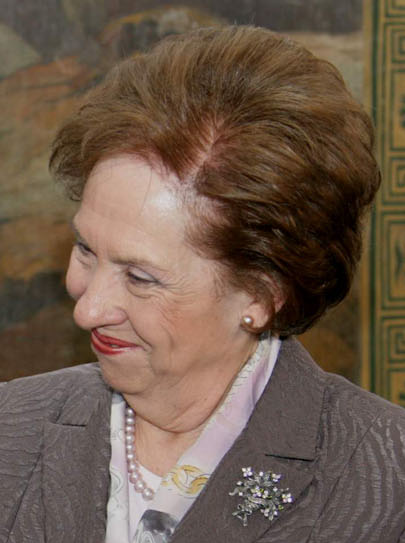
- Benaki-Psarouda in 2007

6th Speaker of the Hellenic Parliament
- In office 19 March 2004 – 28 September 2007
- President: Konstantinos Stephanopoulos; Karolos Papoulias
- Preceded by: Apostolos Kaklamanis
- Succeeded by: Dimitris Sioufas

Minister of Justice
- In office 3 December 1992 – 14 September 1993
- Prime Minister: Konstantinos Mitsotakis
- Preceded by: Ioannis Varvitsiotis
- Succeeded by: Georgios Plagianakos

Minister of Culture
- In office 8 August 1991 – 3 December 1992
- Prime Minister: Konstantinos Mitsotakis
- Preceded by: Tzannis Tzannetakis
- Succeeded by: Dora Bakoyannis
- In office 2 July 1989 – 7 July 1989
- Prime Minister: Tzannis Tzannetakis
- Preceded by: Melina Mercouri
- Succeeded by: Georgios Mylonas

Personal details
- Born: Anna Psarouda; 12 December 1934 Athens, Greece
- Died: 15 February 2026 (aged 91) Athens, Greece
- Party: New Democracy
- Spouse: Linos Benakis (?–2022)
- Education: University of Athens; University of Bonn; University of Freiburg

Anna Benaki-Psarouda (Greek: Άννα Μπενάκη-Ψαρούδα; 12 December 1934 – 15 February 2026) was a Greek lawyer, New Democracy politician and academician.

== Life and career ==
Anna Psarouda was born in Exarcheia, Athens, and obtained her PhD from the University of Bonn. She joined the Athens Bar Association and taught law. In 1981 she entered into politics and in 1985 she was the New Democracy's rapporteur to argue against the constitutional amendments of Andreas Papandreou that had caused a constitutional crisis. In the 1990s, she became culture minister then Minister of Justice. From 2004 to 2007 she served as Speaker of the Hellenic Parliament. She was the first-ever woman to hold that office.

In 2010 she was elected Member of the Academy of Athens. On 7 December 2018 she was elected to serve as vice-president of the Academy of Athens for the year 2019, and president for the year 2020, succeeding Stephanos Imellos in both offices.

Benaki-Psarouda died on 15 February 2026, at the age of 91.

Political offices
Preceded by Melina Mercouri	Minister of Culture; 1989	Succeeded by Georgios Mylonas
Preceded by Tzannis Tzannetakis	Minister of Culture; 1991–1992	Succeeded by Dora Bakoyannis
Preceded by Ioannis Varvitsiotis	Minister of Justice; 1992–1993	Succeeded by Georgios Plagianakos
Preceded by Apostolos Kaklamanis	Speaker of the Hellenic Parliament; 2004–2007	Succeeded by Dimitris Sioufas
Academic offices
Preceded by Stephanos Imellos	Vice-President of the Academy of Athens; 2019	Succeeded by Loucas Christophorou
Preceded by Stephanos Imellos	President of the Academy of Athens; 2020	Succeeded by Loucas Christophorou
