= 1853 Greek parliamentary election =

- 23 September 1853
| Prime Minister before | Prime Minister after |
|---|---|
| Antonios Kriezis | Antonios Kriezis |

Parliamentary elections were held in Greece on 23 September 1853. Supporters of Antonios Kriezis won a majority of the 138 seats. Kriezis remained Prime Minister.
