= 1843 Greek parliamentary election =

← 1829	16 December 1843	1844 →
Party	Leader	Seats
Three-Party Coalition	Andreas Metaxas	120
Makriyannis faction	Yannis Makriyannis	60
Palamidis faction	Rigas Palamidis	30
Independents	–	33
This lists parties that won seats. See the complete results below.
Prime Minister after
Andreas Metaxas; Russian Party

Parliamentary elections were held in Greece on 16 December 1843. The elected body was also tasked with drawing up a constitution, following the 3 September 1843 Revolution. The Three-Party Coalition won almost half the seats in the 243-seat Chamber.

== Background ==
During and after the Greek War of Independence (1821–29), a series of elections for national assemblies had taken place, and promulgated a series of liberal constitutions that enshrined democratic principles. Nevertheless, the Kingdom of Greece, established in 1832 under the Bavarian prince Otto, disregarded the existence of the 1832 Constitution passed by the Fifth National Assembly. From 1832 until 1835, the kingdom was ruled by a Bavarian regency, and after that by Otto as an absolute monarchy.

This situation lasted until the 3 September 1843 Revolution, when an uprising by the garrison and populace of Athens forced King Otto to concede elections for a constitutional assembly. The election resulted in the "Third of September National Assembly of the Greeks at Athens". The new assembly promulgated the Greek Constitution of 1844 in February, which was ratified by Otto in March. After this the National assembly was dissolved and elections proclaimed for the first regular parliament.

== Results ==
Party	Seats
Three-Party coalition	120
Supporters of Yannis Makriyannis	60
Supporters of Rigas Palamidis	30
Independents	33
Total	243
Source: Nohlen & Stöver
