= 1887 Greek parliamentary election =

- 4 January 1887

All 150 seats in the Hellenic Parliament 76 seats needed for a majority
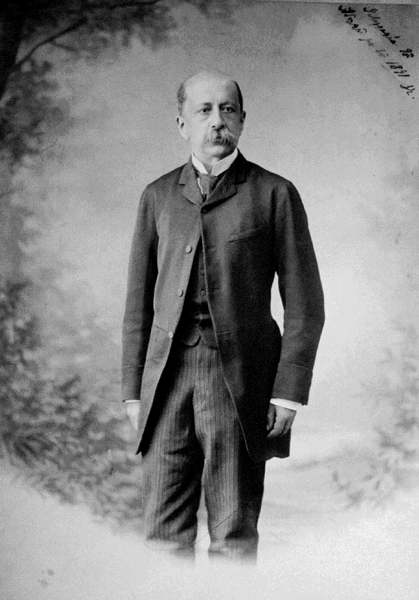

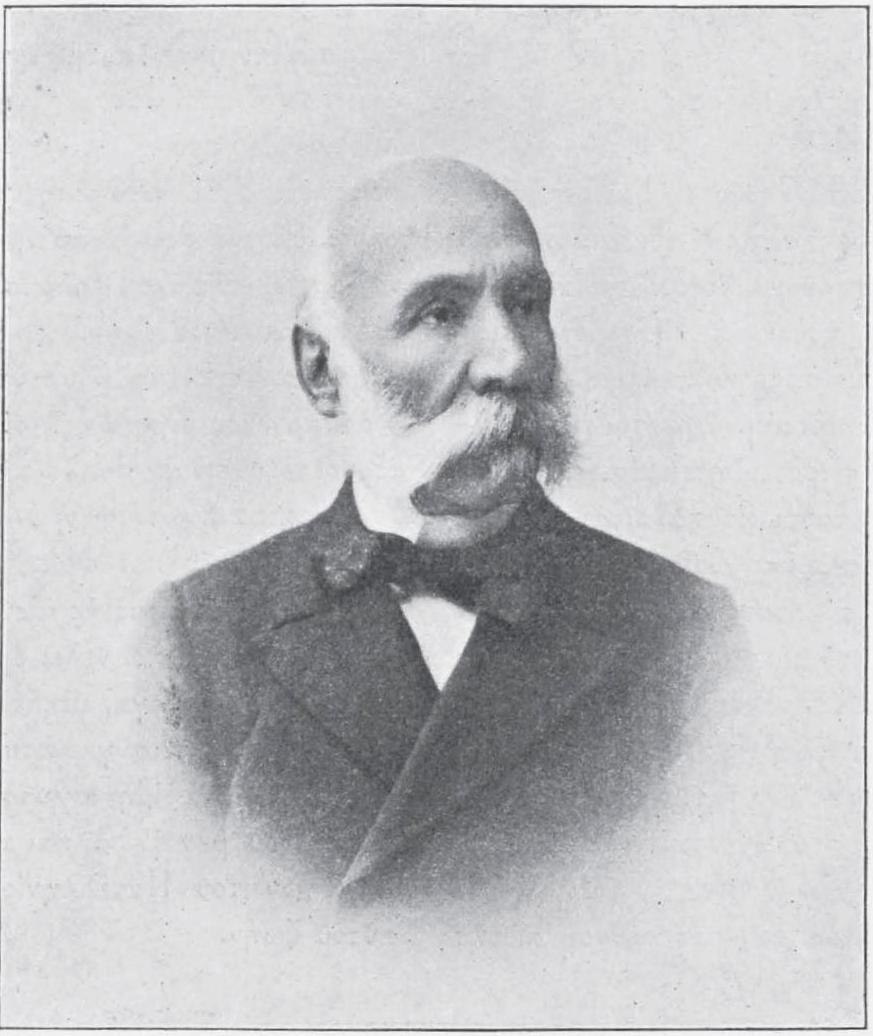
	First party	Second party
Leader	Charilaos Trikoupis	Theodoros Deligiannis
Party	New Party	Nationalist
Leader since	1873	1882
Seats won	90	60
Prime Minister before election
Charilaos Trikoupis
New Party
Prime Minister after election
Charilaos Trikoupis
New Party

Parliamentary elections were held in Greece on 4 January 1887. Supporters of Charilaos Trikoupis emerged as the largest bloc in Parliament, with 90 of the 150 seats. Following the election Trikoupis remained Prime Minister, having assumed office on 21 May 1886.

== Results ==
Party	Seats
Supporters of Charilaos Trikoupis	90
United Opposition	60
Total	150
Source: Nohlen & Stöver
