= Andreas Avgerinos =

Greek politician

Andreas Avgerinos Ανδρέας Αυγερινός
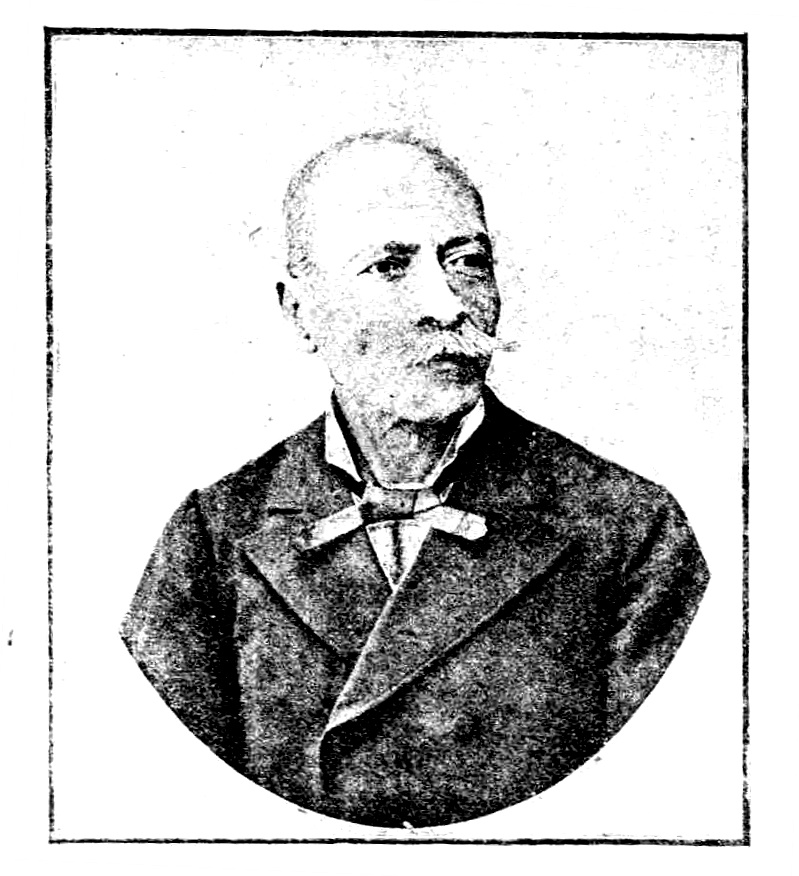
- Born: 1820; Pyrgos, Ottoman Empire in present-day Elis, Greece
- Died: 1895 (aged 74–75); Athens, Kingdom of Greece
- Occupation: politician

Andreas Avgerinos (Greek: Ανδρέας Αυγερινός) (1820–1895) was a Greek politician from Elis.

He was born in Pyrgos, now in Elis, one year before the start of the Greek War of Independence. His father was Dimitrios Avgerinos who studied Pyrgioti families. He was a prefectural leader of Attica and chief of the police in Athens. He became MP for Elis and interior minister, economy and the navy (1876–1879). Avgerinos was Speaker of the Hellenic Parliament from 1877 until 1879, again in 1881 and his third and last from 1887 to 1890.

He was awarded the Commander's Cross of the Order of the Redeemer and awarded distinction from the kings of Italy and Spain. He was a member of the Athens Odeum and president of the District Council of the Pyrgos-Katakolo Railway Company. He has a great interest in nature, demonstrated by his concern for his tree planting on Lycabettus and the parliamentary gardens. In his villa in Patisia he preserved a large flower garden with over 60 kinds of roses. He died in 1895.
