= Ioannis Deligiannis (politician) =

Greek politician

Ioannis Deligiannis (c. 1815–1876) was a Greek politician. He was foreign minister (1874–1875) and minister of the interior (1876) in the Government of Greece.

Preceded by Ioannis Spiliotakis	Foreign minister of Greece; 1874–1875	Succeeded by Charilaos Trikoupis
Preceded by Alexandros Koumoundouros	Ministers of the Interior of Greece; 1876	Succeeded by Alexandros Koumoundouros
