= 1847 Greek parliamentary election =

- June 1847
Prime Minister before	Prime Minister after
Ioannis Kolettis; French Party	Kitsos Tzavelas; French Party

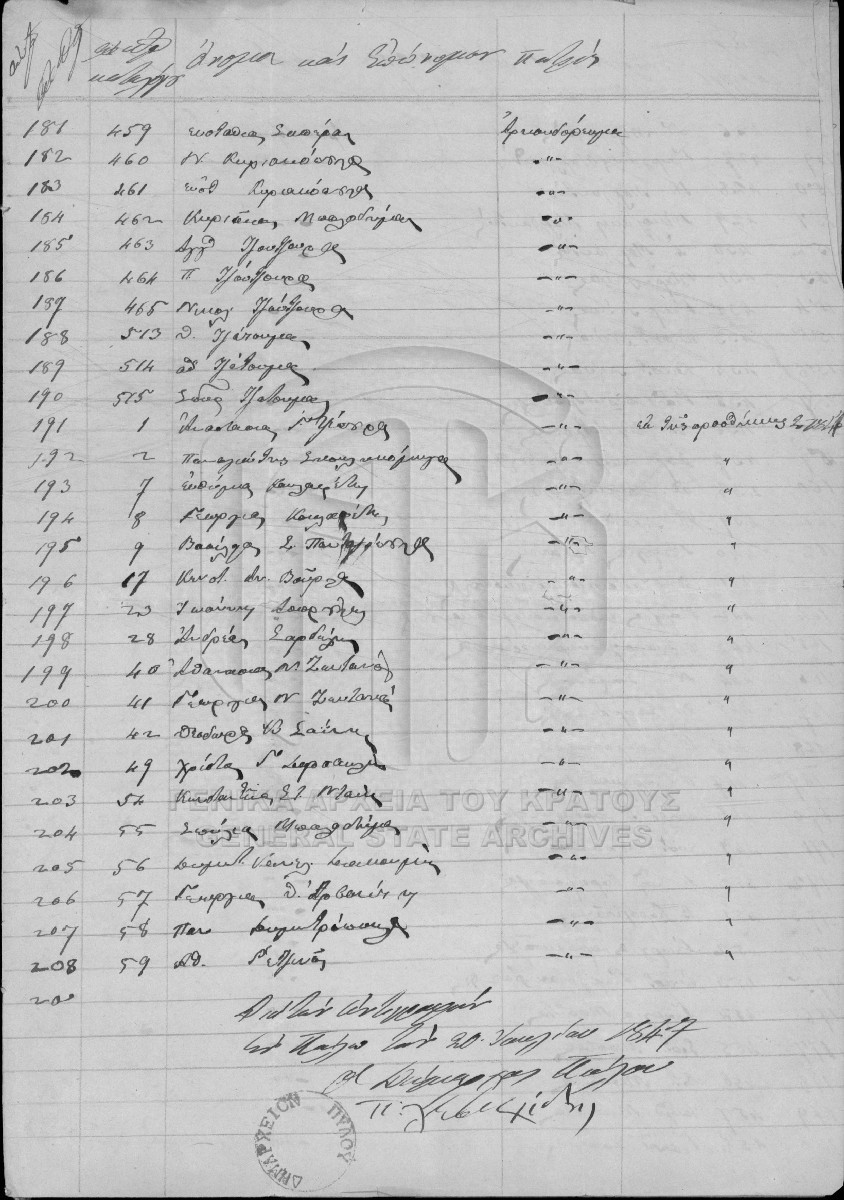
Greek elections 1847: Voters list from Municipality of Pylos

Parliamentary elections were held in Greece in June 1847. Supporters of Ioannis Kolettis won a majority of the 127 seats. However, he remained Prime Minister only until his death on 17 September, after which Kitsos Tzavelas assumed office.
