= Langadia, Arcadia =

Village in the Peloponnese, Greece

Lagadia Λαγκάδια
- Municipal unit
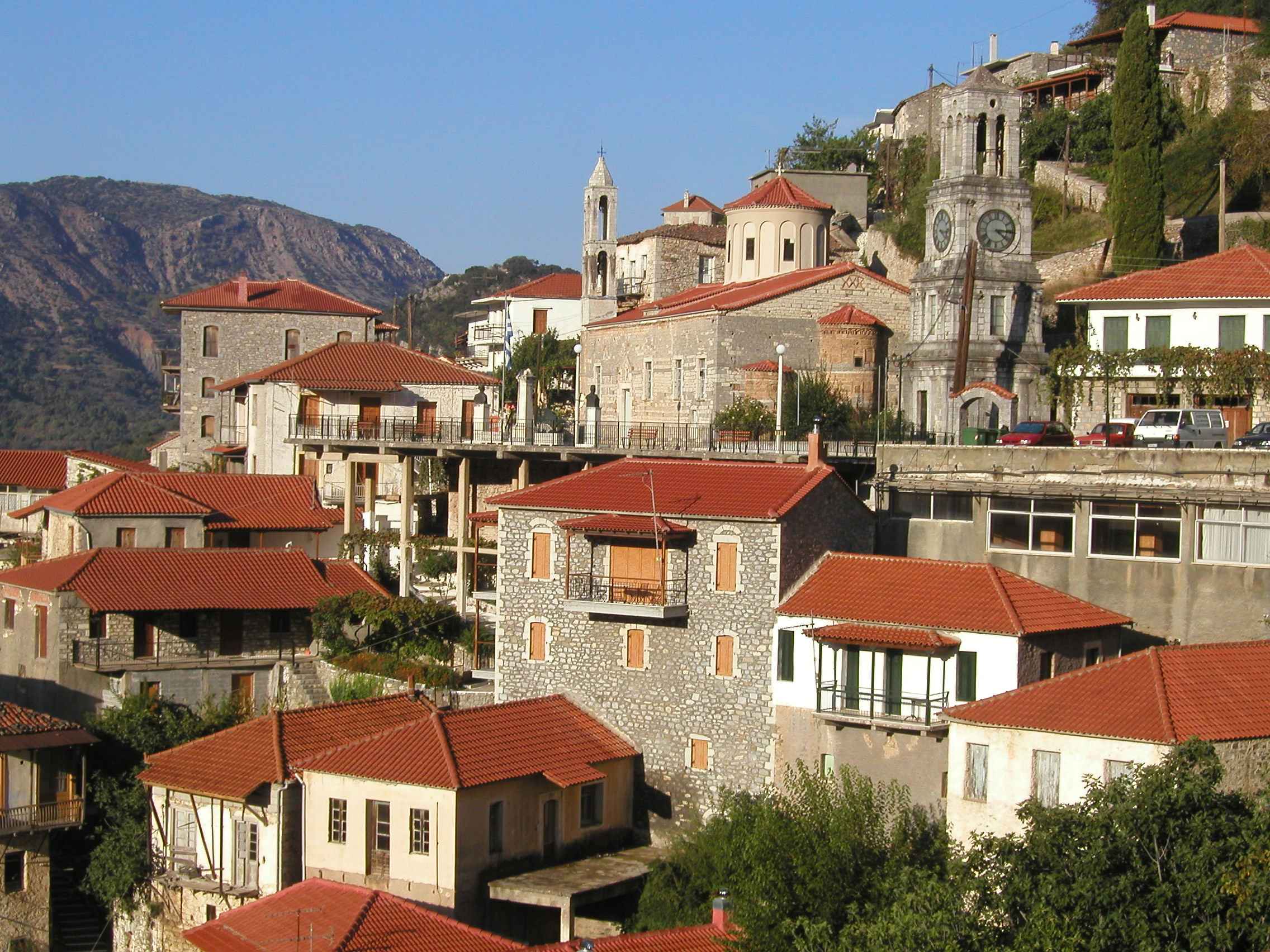

- Location within the regional unit

- Location within Greece
- Coordinates: 37°41′N 22°2′E
- Country: Greece
- Administrative region: Peloponnese
- Regional unit: Arcadia
- Municipality: Gortynia

Area
  - Municipal unit: 79.48 km^{2} (30.69 sq mi)
- Elevation: 976 m (3,202 ft)

Population (2021)
  - Municipal unit: 490
  - Municipal unit density: 6.2/km^{2} (16/sq mi)
  - Community: 394
- Time zone: UTC+2 (EET)
  - Summer (DST): UTC+3 (EEST)
- Postal code: 220 03
- Area code: 27950
- Vehicle registration: TP

Lagadia (Greek: Λαγκάδια) is a mountain village and a former municipality in Arcadia, Peloponnese, Greece. Since the 2011 local government reform it is part of the municipality Gortynia, of which it is a municipal unit. The municipal unit has an area of 79.475 km^{2}. The seat of the municipality was the village Lagadia. It is considered a traditional settlement and is situated on a mountain slope, at about 1000 m elevation. It is 5 km east of Lefkochori, 10 km north of Dimitsana and 36 km northwest of Tripoli. The Greek National Road 74 (Pyrgos - Olympia - Tripoli) passes through the village.

The village has a school, a church, a post office, and a square. Kanellos Deligiannis and his brother Dimitrakis Deligiannis, two of the many heroes of the Greek War of Independence against the Turks in 1821, were born here.

== Subdivisions ==
The municipal unit Langadia is subdivided into the following communities (constituent villages in brackets):

- Lagadia (Lagadia, Agios Athanasios, Agios Nikolaos, Kaloneri, Pteria, Xerovouni)
- Lefkochori (Lefkochori, Fouskari, Touthoa)

== Population history ==
- 1949: 3,333
- 1981: 1,188 (village)
- 1991: 671 (village), 1,993 (municipality)
- 2001: 704 (village), 1,363 (municipality)
- 2011: 355 (village), 504 (community), 636 (municipal unit)

== Geography ==
=== Climate ===
Lagadia is located in central Peloponnese and has a Mediterranean climate with hot and dry summers and milder winters.

Climate data for Lagadia, Greece
Month	Jan	Feb	Mar	Apr	May	Jun	Jul	Aug	Sep	Oct	Nov	Dec	Year
Mean daily maximum °F (°C)	58.46 (14.70)	58.82 (14.90)	62.06 (16.70)	67.64 (19.80)	76.1 (24.5)	84.38 (29.10)	88.16 (31.20)	88.16 (31.20)	83.3 (28.5)	75.74 (24.30)	67.1 (19.5)	60.62 (15.90)	72.545 (22.53)
Mean daily minimum °F (°C)	41.36 (5.20)	41.54 (5.30)	42.98 (6.10)	47.3 (8.5)	53.96 (12.20)	60.26 (15.70)	64.22 (17.90)	64.4 (18.0)	60.44 (15.80)	54.86 (12.70)	48.74 (9.30)	43.88 (6.60)	51.995 (11.11)
Source: <yr.no >"Weather statistics for Lagadia". Weather statistics for Lagadia, Peloponnese (Greece). yr.no. 2016.

== Photo gallery ==
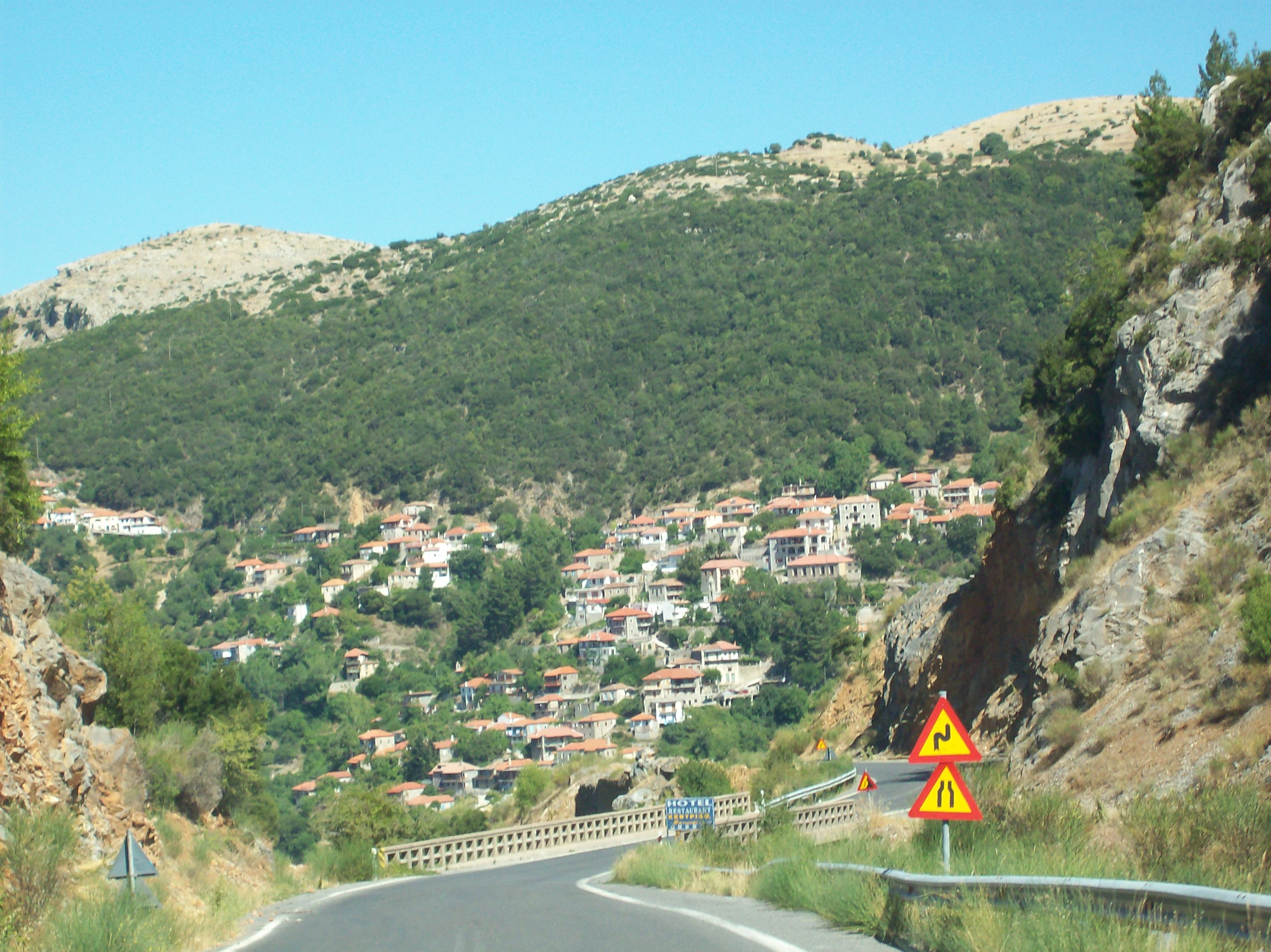
View of Lagadia village in Arcadia from roadway.

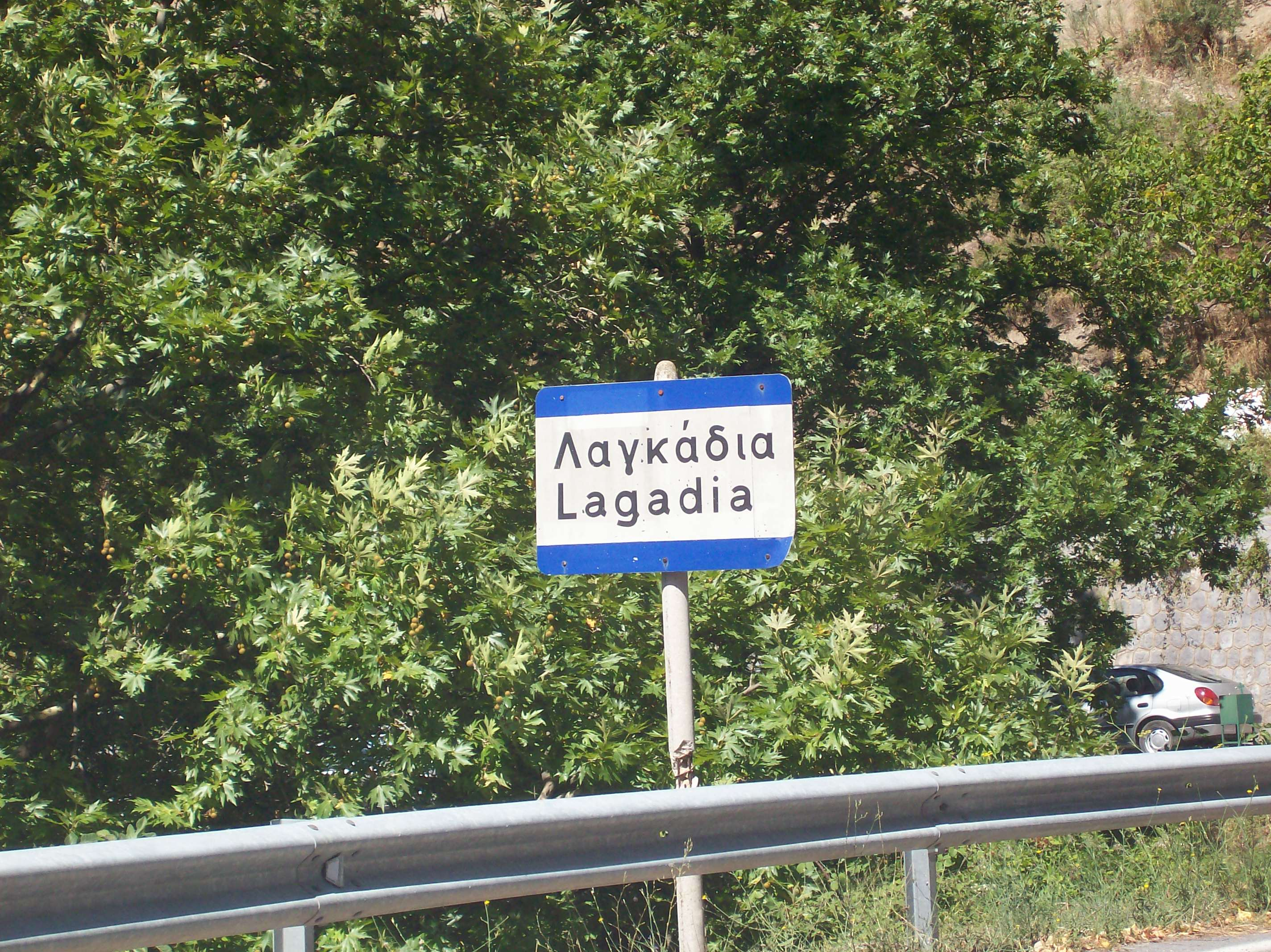
Lagadia village road sign.

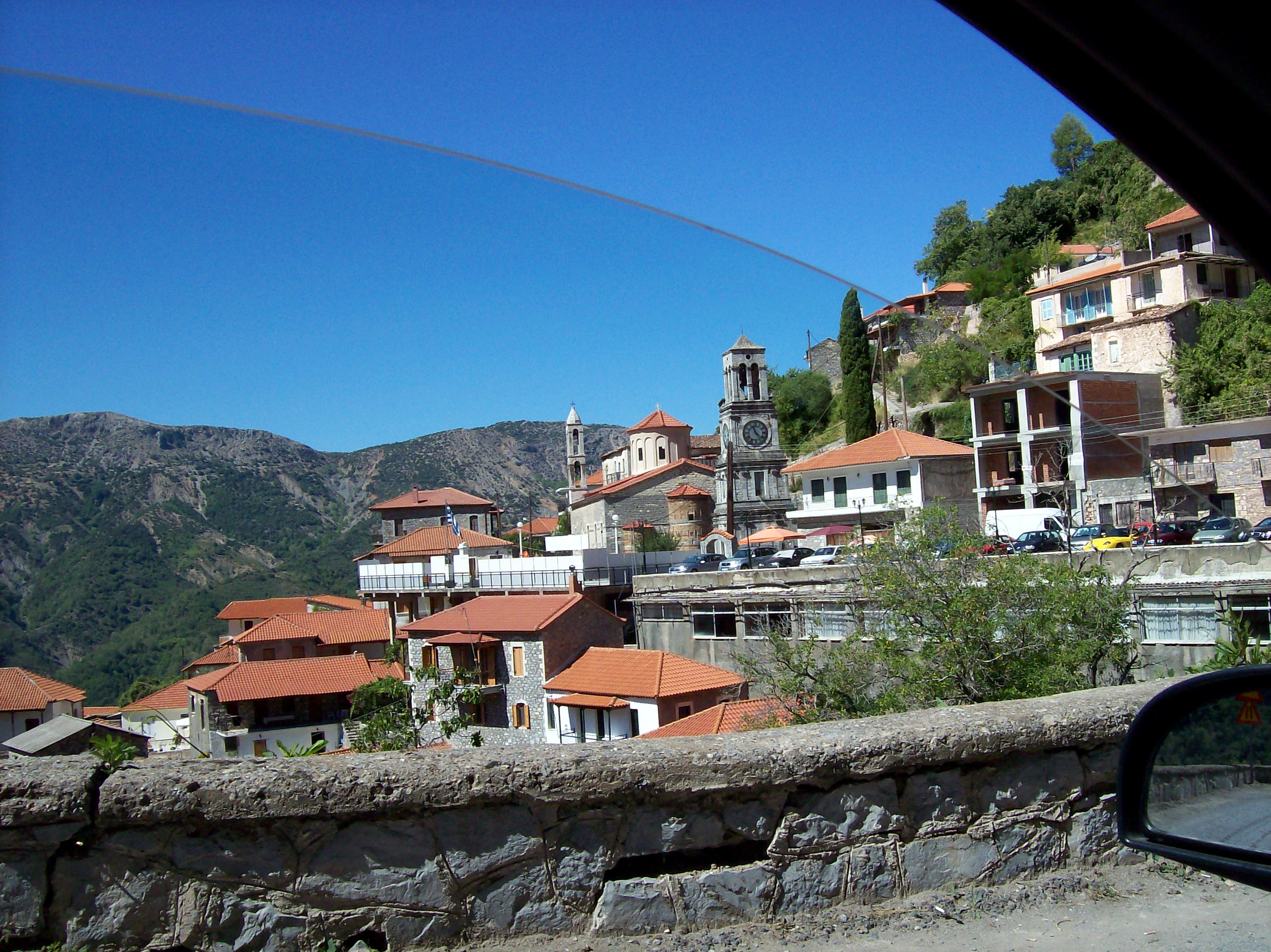
View of Lagadia.

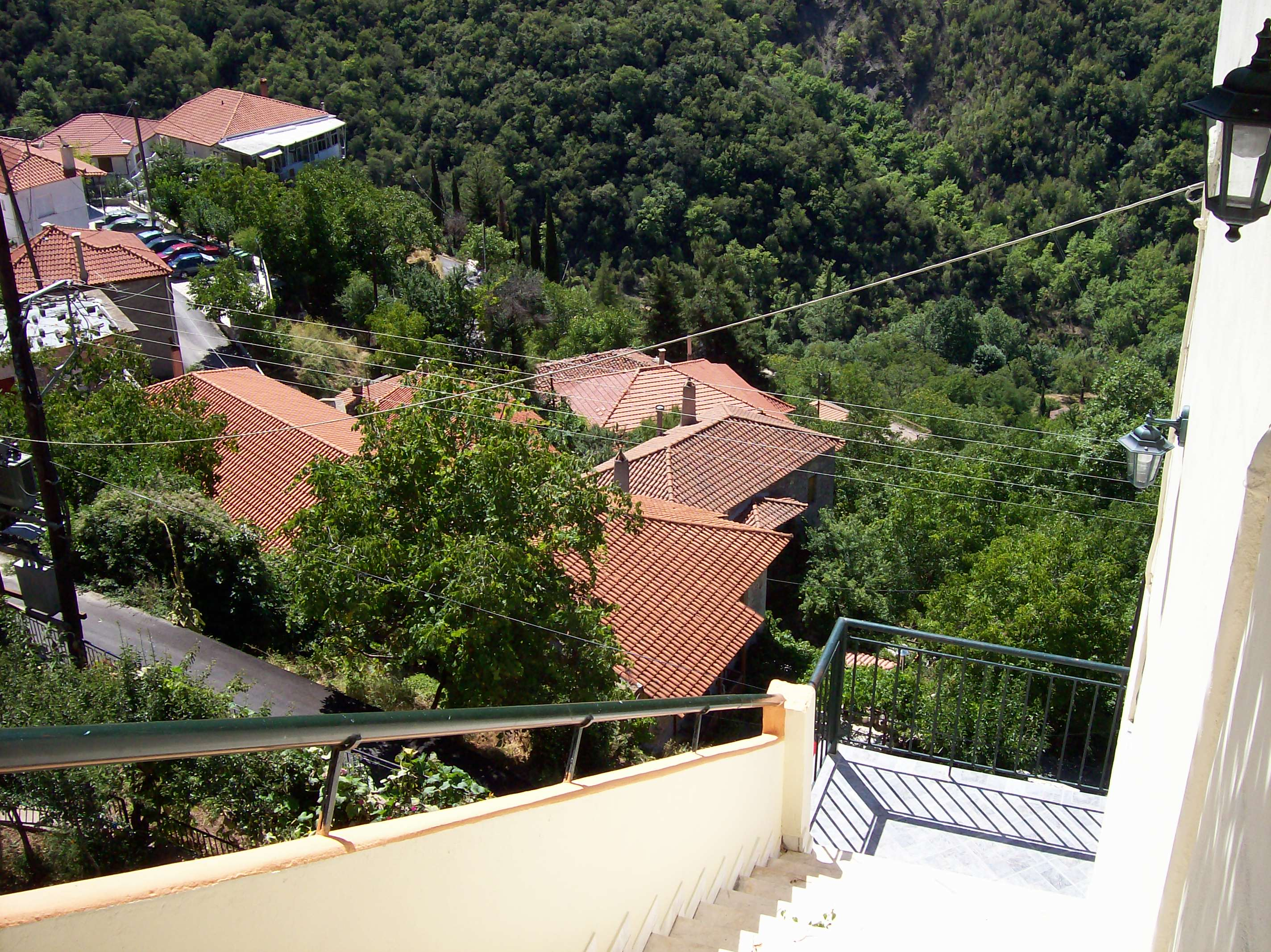
Looking down from roadway at Lagadia village buildings.

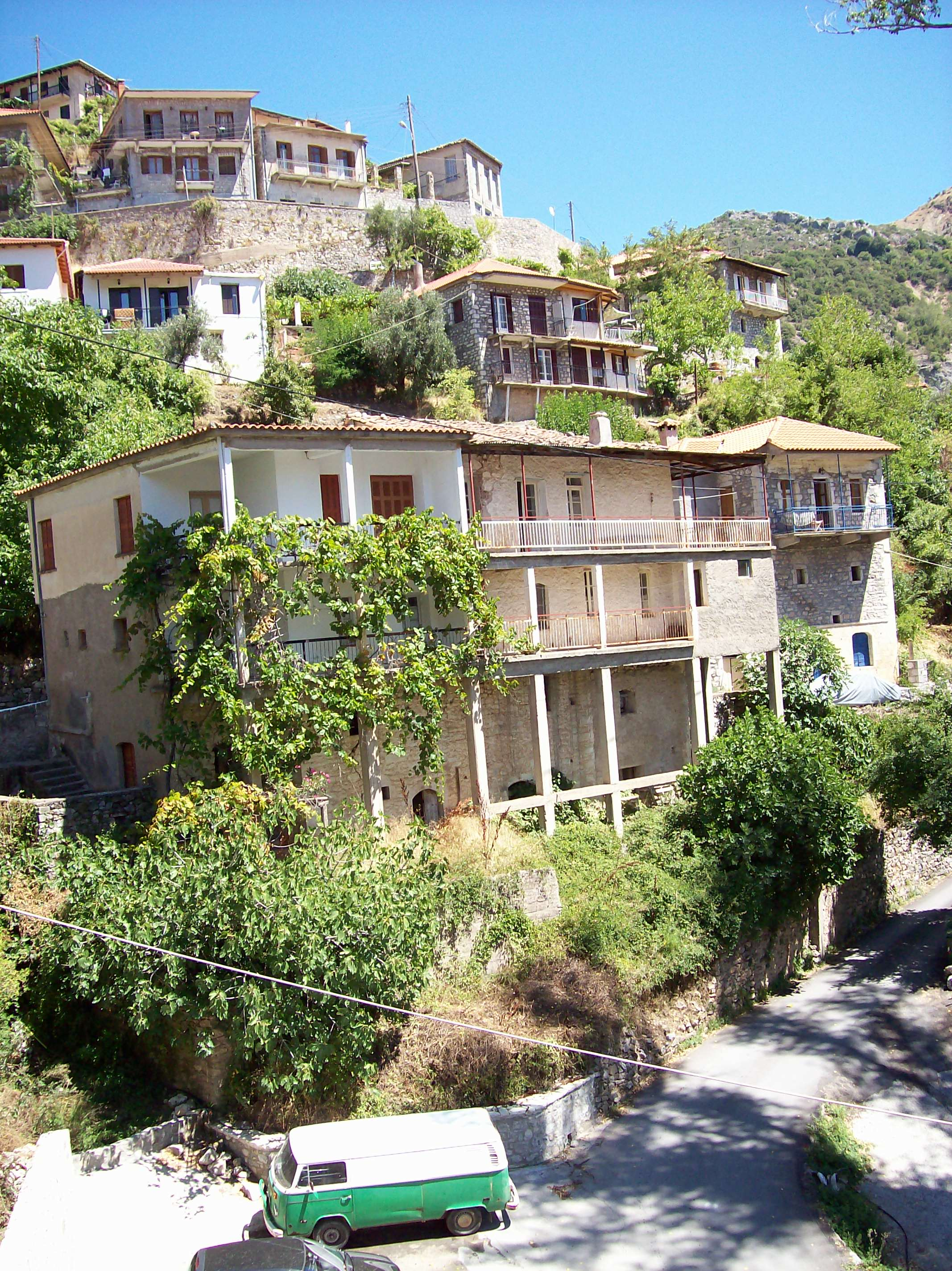
Scene of buildings in Langadia village.

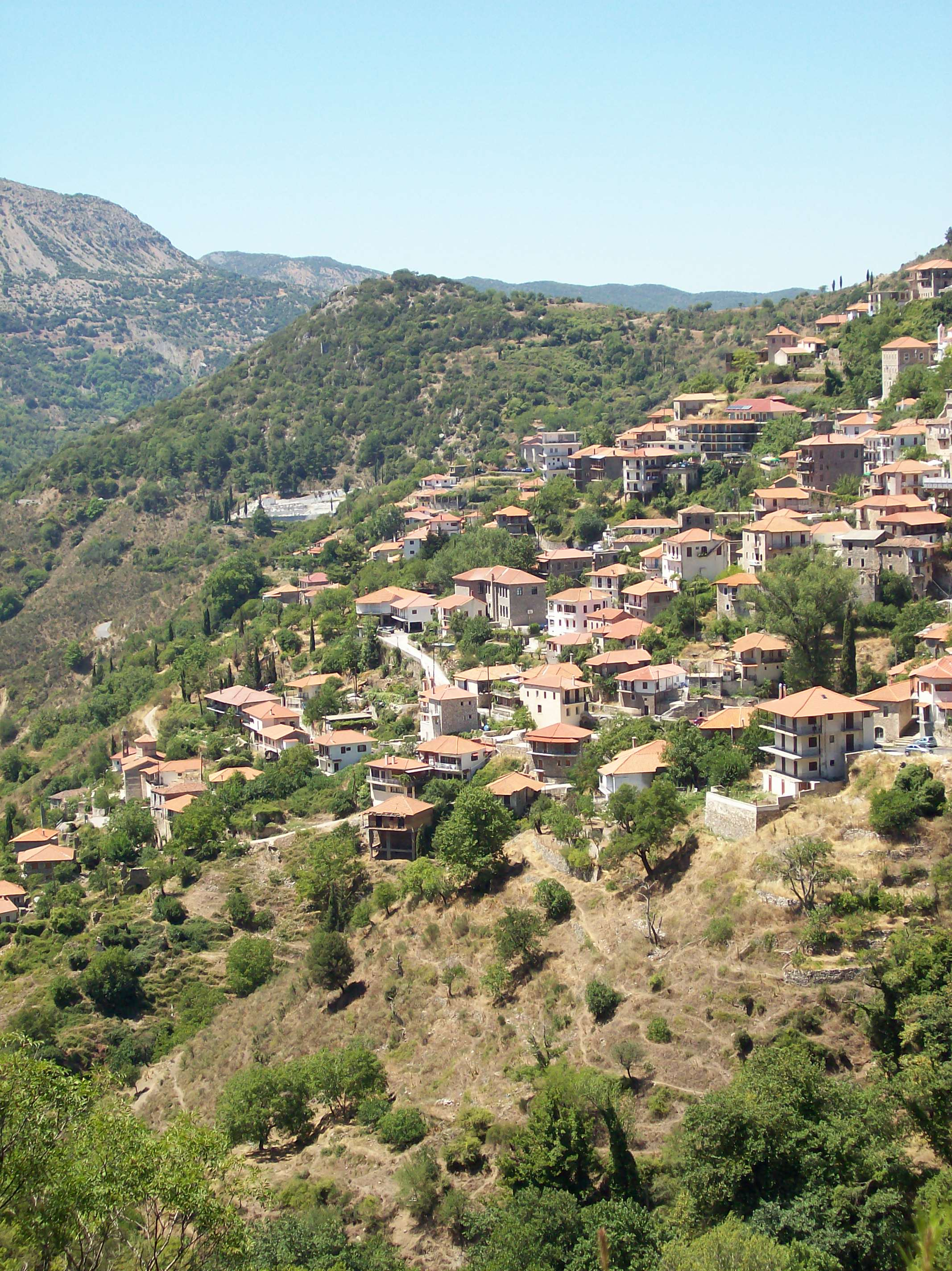
Another view of Lagadia village from afar.

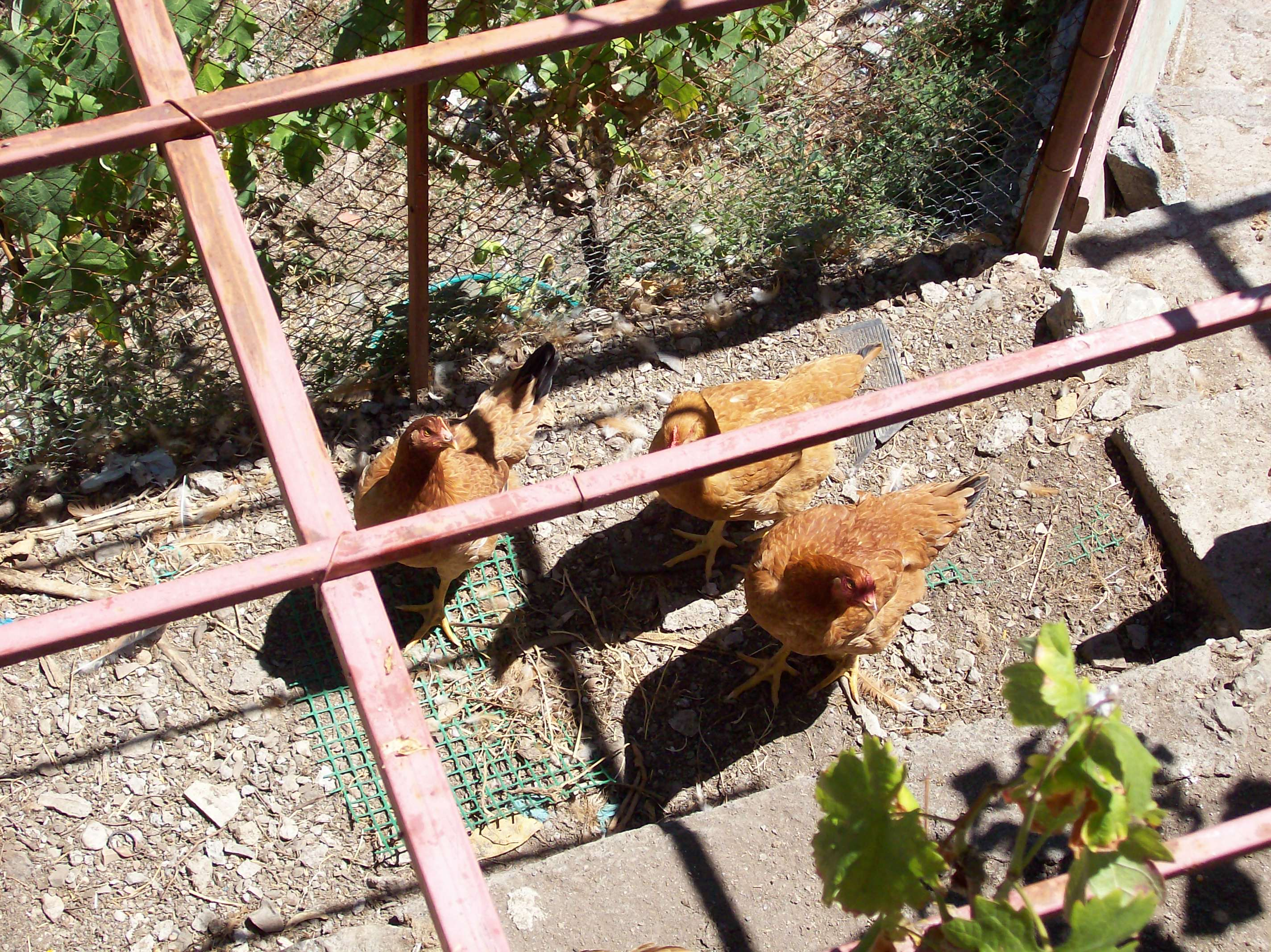
Chickens in Lagadia village.

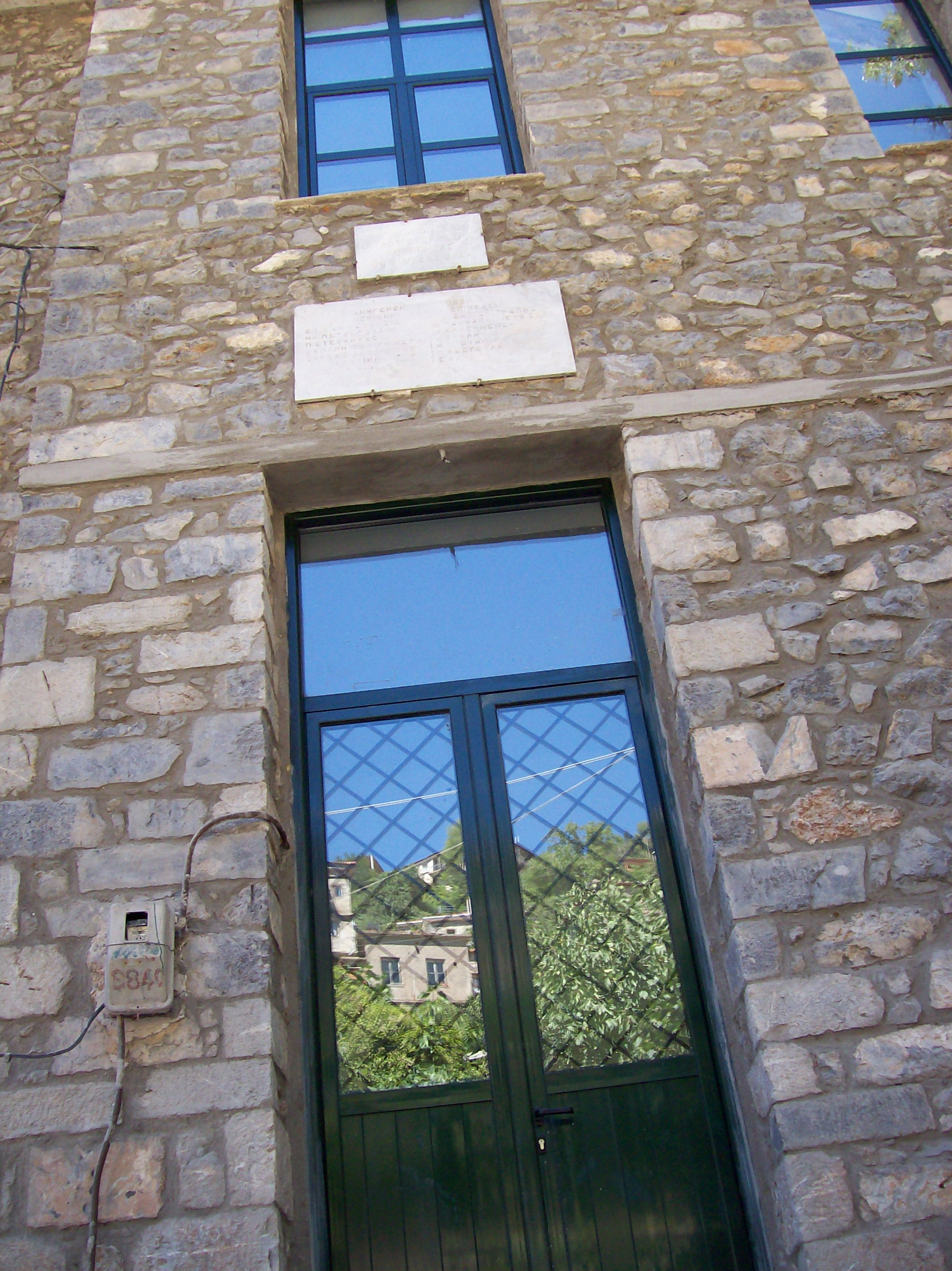
School building in Lagadia village.

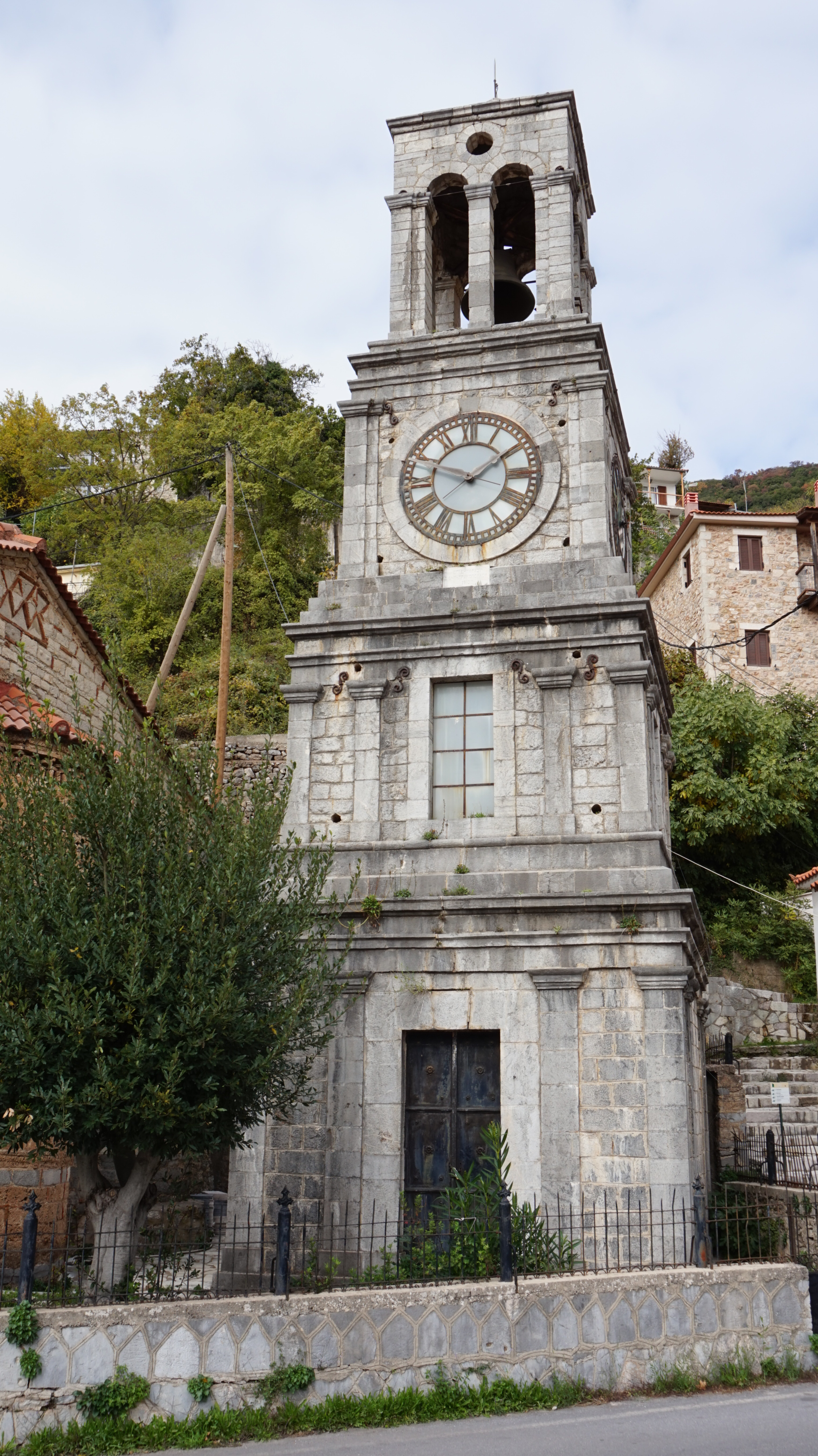
The clock tower of the Taxiarches Church.

== See also ==
- List of settlements in Arcadia
- List of traditional settlements of Greece
