= November 1910 Greek parliamentary election =

- 11 December [O.S. 28 November] 1910

All 362 seats in the Hellenic Parliament 182 seats needed for a majority
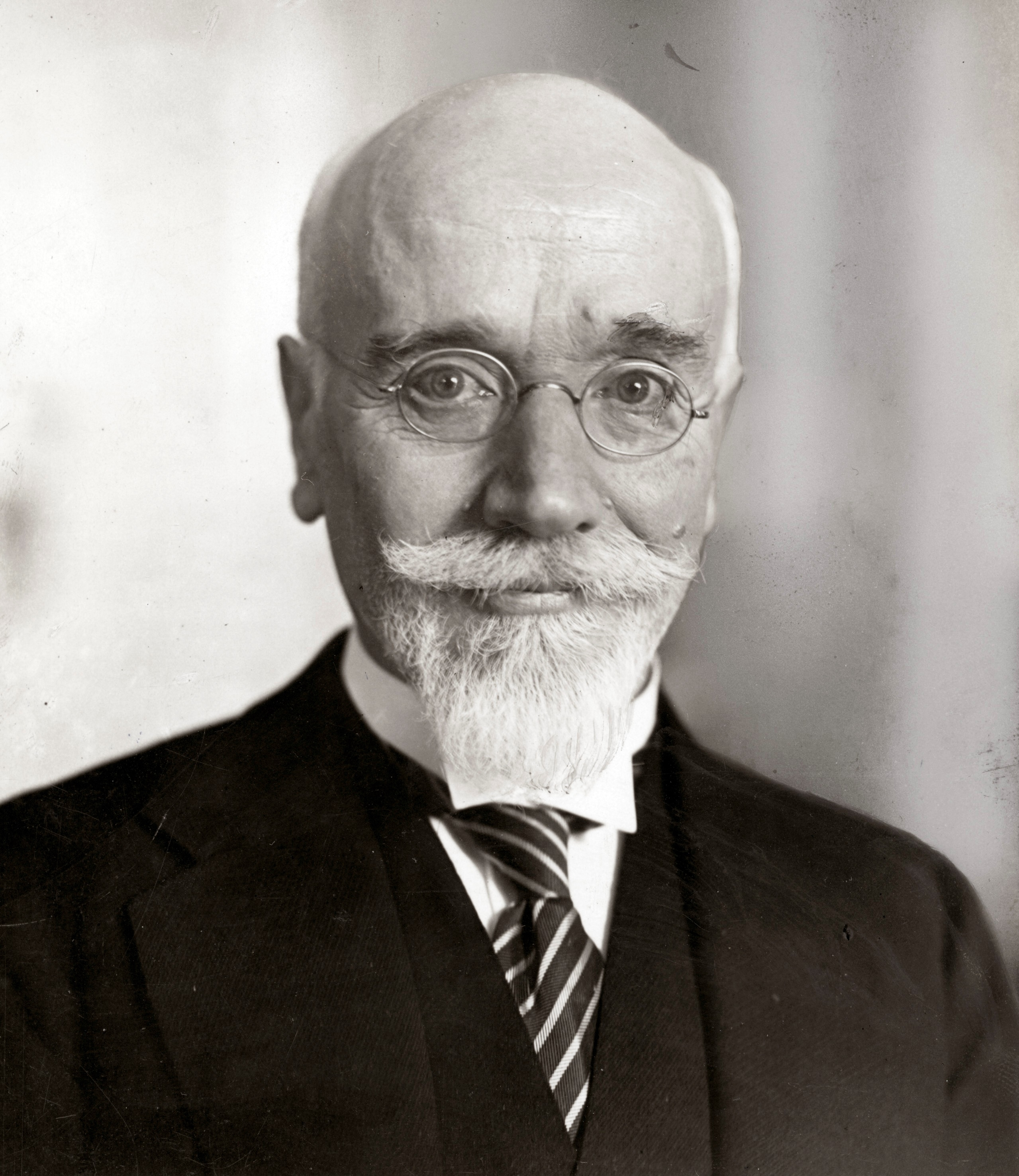

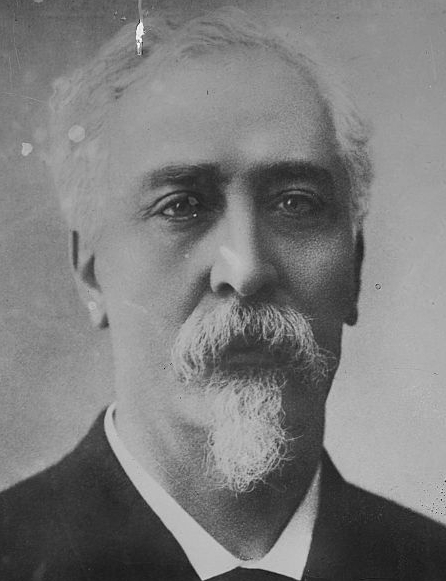
| | First party | Second party |
|---|---|---|
| Leader | Eleftherios Venizelos | Stefanos Dragoumis |
| Party | Liberal | MA |
| Seats won | 307 | 42 |
Prime Minister before election
Eleftherios Venizelos
Liberal
Prime Minister after election
Eleftherios Venizelos
Liberal

Parliamentary elections were held in Greece on 11 December [O.S. 28 November] 1910, following elections in August. The Liberal Party won 307 of the 362 seats. Eleftherios Venizelos remained Prime Minister, having assumed office on 18 October.

== Results ==
| Party | Seats |
|---|---|
| Liberal Party | 307 |
| Small opposition | 42 |
| Supporters of Dimitrios Rallis | 0 |
| Independents | 13 |
| Total | 362 |
Source: Nohlen & Stöver
