= August 1910 Greek parliamentary election =

- 21 August [O.S. 8 August] 1910

All 362 seats in the Hellenic Parliament 182 seats needed for a majority
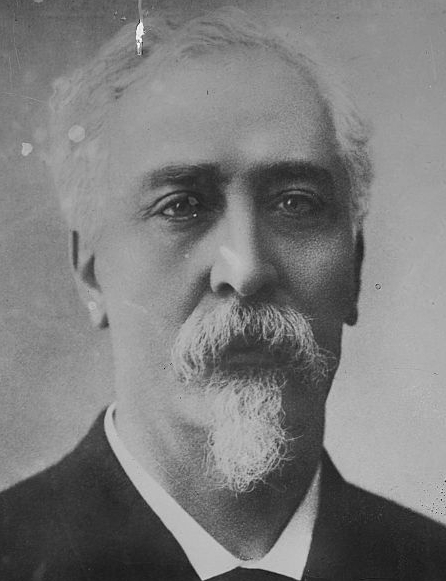

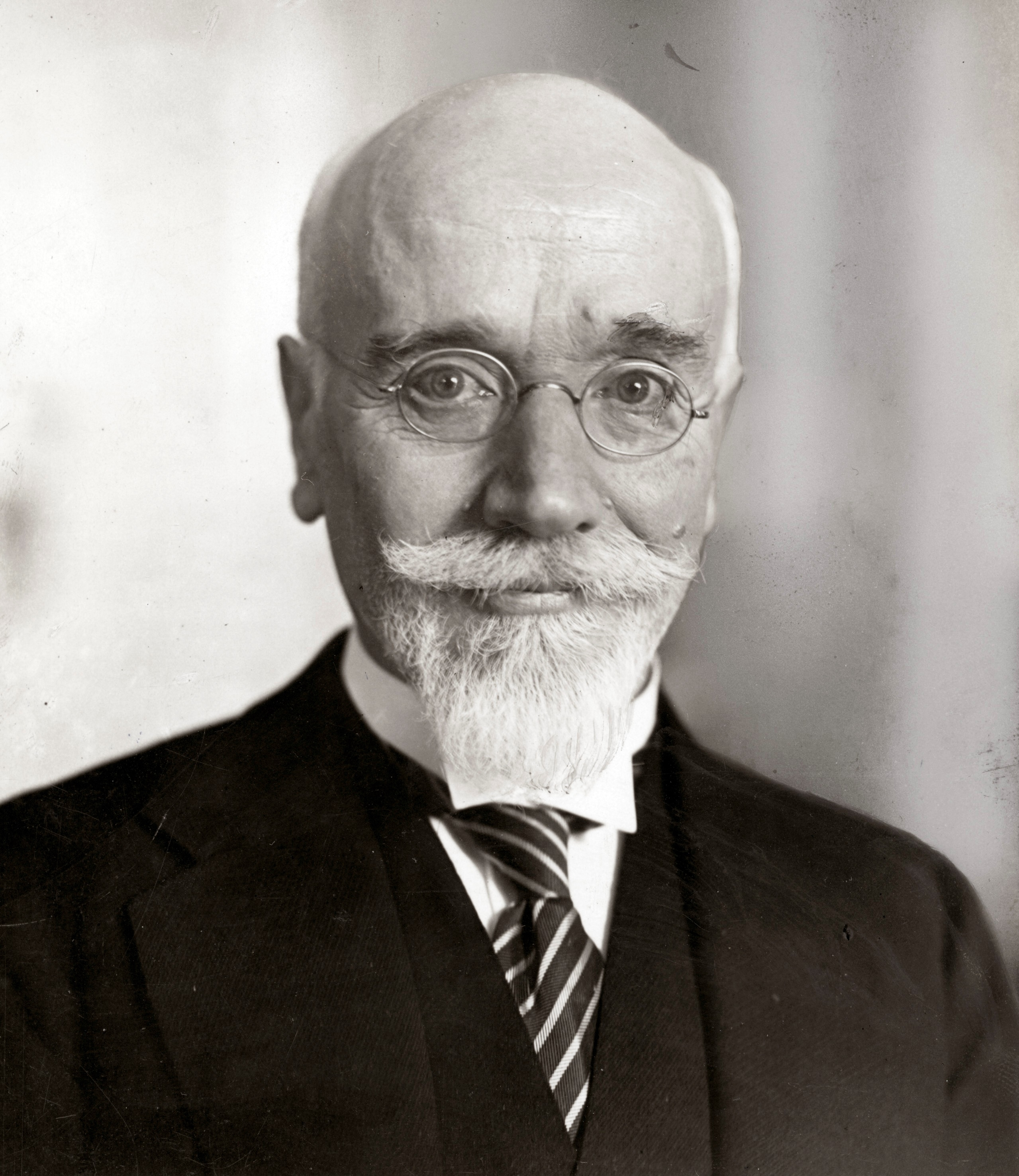

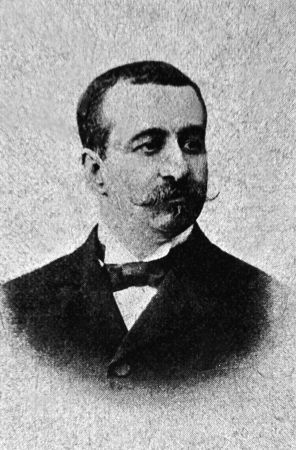
	First party	Second party	Third party
Leader	Stefanos Dragoumis	Eleftherios Venizelos	Kyriakoulis Mavromichalis
Party	UP	ISC	National Party
Seats won	210	45	34
Prime Minister before election
Stefanos Dragoumis
Independent
Prime Minister after election
Stefanos Dragoumis
Independent

Parliamentary elections were held in Greece on 21 August [O.S. 8 August] 1910. Eleftherios Venizelos had begun to dominate the political life of the country. He was listed as a candidate by his followers and was elected with the most votes at the Attica-Boeotia constituency. The United Parties won 210 of the 362 seats. Stefanos Dragoumis remained prime minister until his resignation on 18 October [O.S. 6 October] 1910, when Venizelos became prime minister. Because Venizelos did not have the confidence of Parliament, he agreed with King George to dissolve parliament. Fresh elections were held in November.

== Results ==
Party	Seats
United Parties	210
Theotokis supporters	94
Rallis supporters	64
Zaimis supporters	13
Independents	39
Agrarians of Thessaly	46
Independent Supporters for Change	45
National party	34
Dimitrakopoulos supporters	21
Socialists	4
Sociologists	2
Total	362
Source: Hellenic Parliament
