= Dragoumis =

Dragoumis (Greek: Δραγούμης) is a Greek surname. It may refer to:

- Ion Dragoumis (1878–1920), Greek diplomat, philosopher, writer and revolutionary
- Nikolaos Dragoumis (1874–1933), Greek painter, son of Stephanos Dragoumis
- Stefanos Dragoumis (1842–1923), Prime Minister of Greece
