= Lachanokipoi =

- Settlement
- Location within Greece
- Coordinates: 40°26′50″N 21°12′52″E
- Country: Greece
- Geographic region: Macedonia
- Administrative region: Western Macedonia
- Regional unit: Kastoria
- Municipality: Argos Orestiko
- Municipal unit: Argos Orestiko
- Community: Lakkomata

Population (2021)
  - Total: 86
- Time zone: UTC+2 (EET)
  - Summer (DST): UTC+3 (EEST)

Lachanokipoi (Greek: Λαχανόκηποι, before 1926: Γκόσινον – Gkosinon) is a village in Kastoria Regional Unit, Macedonia, Greece. It is part of the community of Lakkomata.

In 1945, Greek Foreign Minister Ioannis Politis ordered the compilation of demographic data regarding the Prefecture of Kastoria. The village Lachanokipoi had a total of 273 inhabitants, and was populated by 140 Slavophones without a Bulgarian national consciousness.
