= Krya Nera =

- Settlement
- Location within Greece
- Coordinates: 40°25′9″N 21°10′36″E
- Country: Greece
- Geographic region: Macedonia
- Administrative region: Western Macedonia
- Regional unit: Kastoria
- Municipality: Argos Orestiko
- Municipal unit: Argos Orestiko
- Community: Lakkomata

Population (2021)
  - Total: 5
- Time zone: UTC+2 (EET)
  - Summer (DST): UTC+3 (EEST)

Krya Nera (Greek: Κρύα Νερά, before 1926: Λούδοβον – Loudovon) is a village in Kastoria Regional Unit, Macedonia, Greece. It is part of the community of Lakkomata.

In 1945, Greek Foreign Minister Ioannis Politis ordered the compilation of demographic data regarding the Prefecture of Kastoria. The village Krya Nera had a total of 124 inhabitants, and was populated by 65 Slavophones without a Bulgarian national consciousness.
