= Velos, Kastoria =

Village in Western Macedonia, Greece

Velos
- Settlement
- Location within Greece
- Coordinates: 40°22′47″N 21°17′41″E
- Country: Greece
- Geographic region: Macedonia
- Administrative region: Western Macedonia
- Regional unit: Kastoria
- Municipality: Argos Orestiko
- Municipal unit: Argos Orestiko
- Community: Dialekto

Population (2021)
  - Total: 32
- Time zone: UTC+2 (EET)
  - Summer (DST): UTC+3 (EEST)

Velos (Greek: Βέλος, before 1928: Ρεσούλιανη – Resouliani, between 1928 and 1959: Καλονέριον – Kaloneri), is a village in Kastoria Regional Unit, Western Macedonia, Greece. It is part of the community of Dialekto.

Resouliani was a mixed village and a part of its population were Greek speaking Muslim Vallahades.
