= Ampelochori, Kastoria =

Village in Western Macedonia, Greece

Ampelochori Αμπελοχώρι
- Settlement
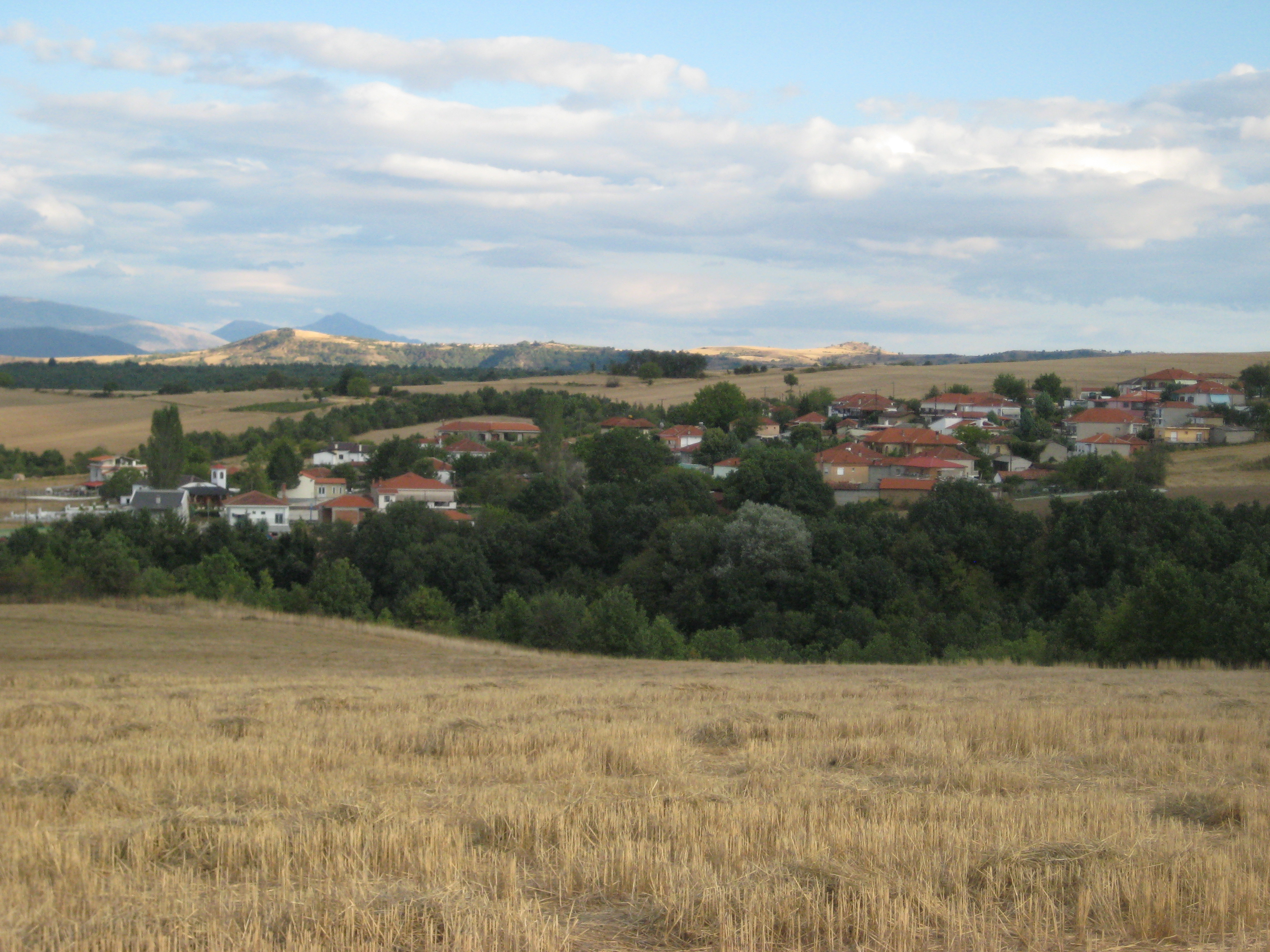
- Ampelochori village

- Location within Greece
- Coordinates: 40°25′48″N 21°15′39″E
- Country: Greece
- Geographic region: Macedonia
- Administrative region: Western Macedonia
- Regional unit: Kastoria
- Municipality: Argos Orestiko
- Municipal unit: Argos Orestiko
- Community: Ammoudara

Population (2021)
  - Total: 106
- Time zone: UTC+2 (EET)
  - Summer (DST): UTC+3 (EEST)

Ampelochori (Greek: Αμπελοχώρι, before 1927: Μαρκόβιανη – Markoviani, renamed until 1950: Μαρκοχώρι – Markochori) is a village in Kastoria Regional Unit, Western Macedonia, Greece. It is part of the community of Ammoudara.

The 1920 Greek census recorded 119 people in the village, and 120 inhabitants (15 families) were Muslim in 1923. Following the Greek–Turkish population exchange, Greek refugee families in Markoviani were from Pontus (11) in 1926. The 1928 Greek census recorded 135 village inhabitants. In 1928, the refugee families numbered 11 (51 people).
