= YMCA Park (Thessaloniki) =

Park in Thessaloniki, Greece

- Interactive map of YMCA Park
- Type: Municipal public park
- Coordinates: 40°37′31″N 22°57′06″E
- Status: Open
- Public transit: Bus

YMCA Park Thessaloniki is a 11.52-acre (46,627 m2) public park in the municipality of Thessaloniki, Greece. One of the best known of Thessaloniki's public parks, it is a center for cultural activity.

The park is an open space with the fountain area being one of the city's popular spots.

== Location and features ==
Located in downtown Thessaloniki, the park is bordered by the Thessaloniki International Trade Fair (north and east of the park) and the White Tower of Thessaloniki (south and west of the park). The prominent features of the Park are the Fountain facing the city's seafront, the Statue of Philip II of Macedon and the Municipal Open theatre. It includes children's play areas, trees and gardens, park benches, outdoor gyms and commemorative statuary. The park used to include a Skatepark that was demolished in 2015.

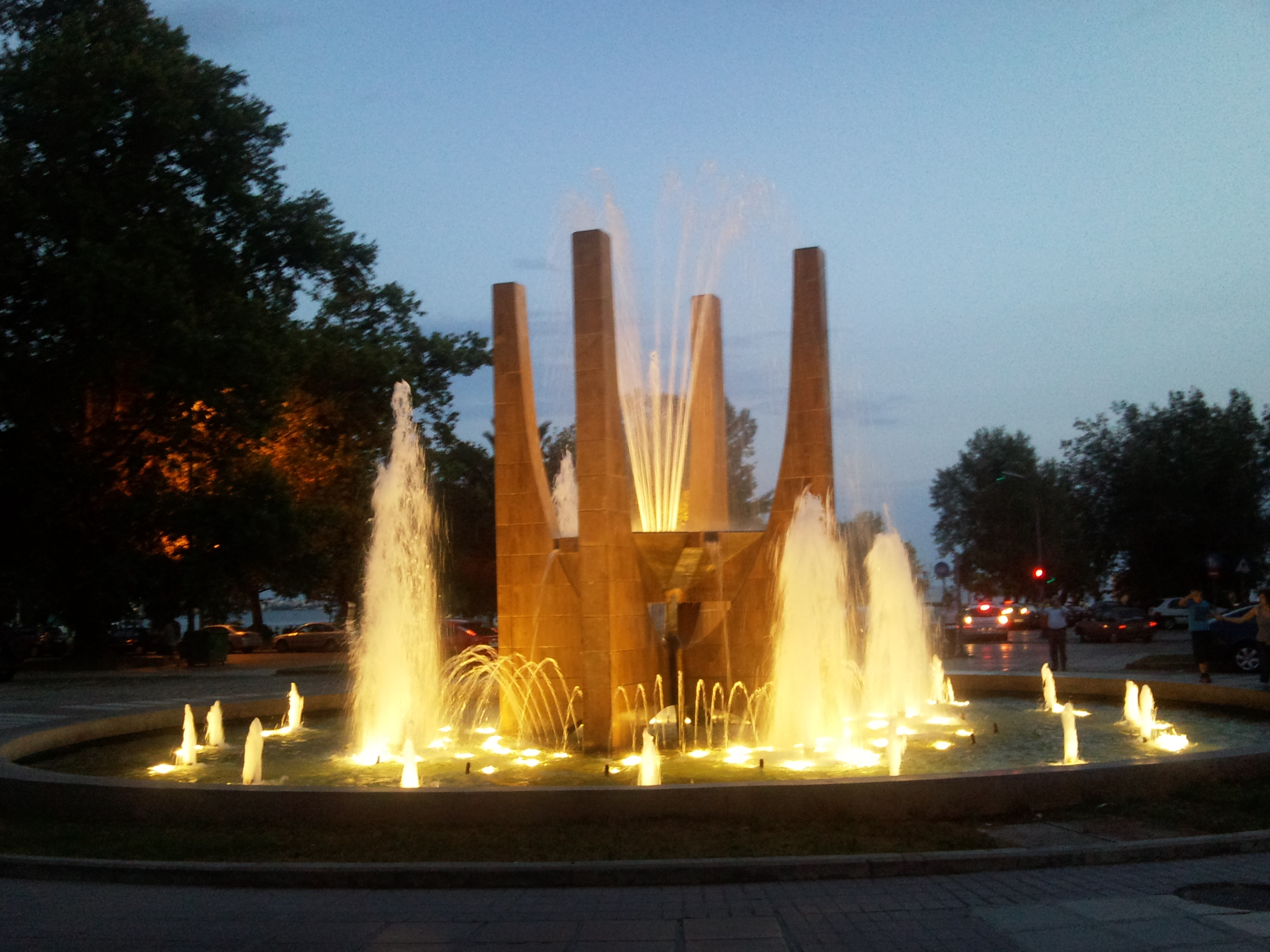
The Parks fountain

Those commemorated by statues and monuments include Philip King of Macedon, Emmanouel Pappas leader of the Greek War of Independence in Macedonia, Manolis Andronikos archeologist and Ion Dragoumis Greek Diplomat.

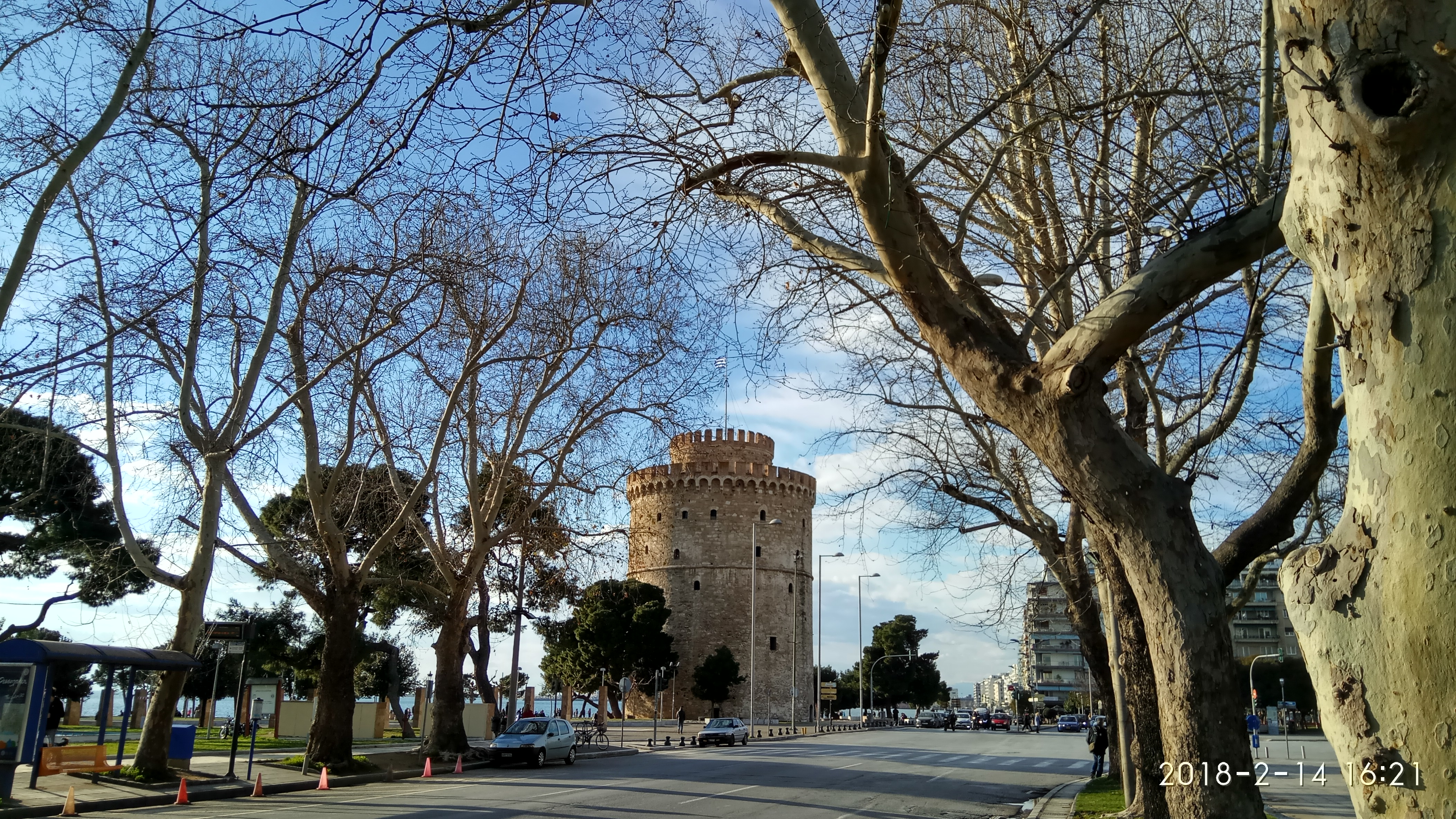
The White Tower of Thessaloniki as seen from the Park

=== 21st-century renovation ===
In 2011 the Park underwent renovation work which saw the addition of a Skatepark, a Paintball field and a climbing wall and was rebranded to What's up park.

In 2019 the Statue of Ion Dragoumis was placed in the Park. In 2020 there was renovation work on the parks trails.

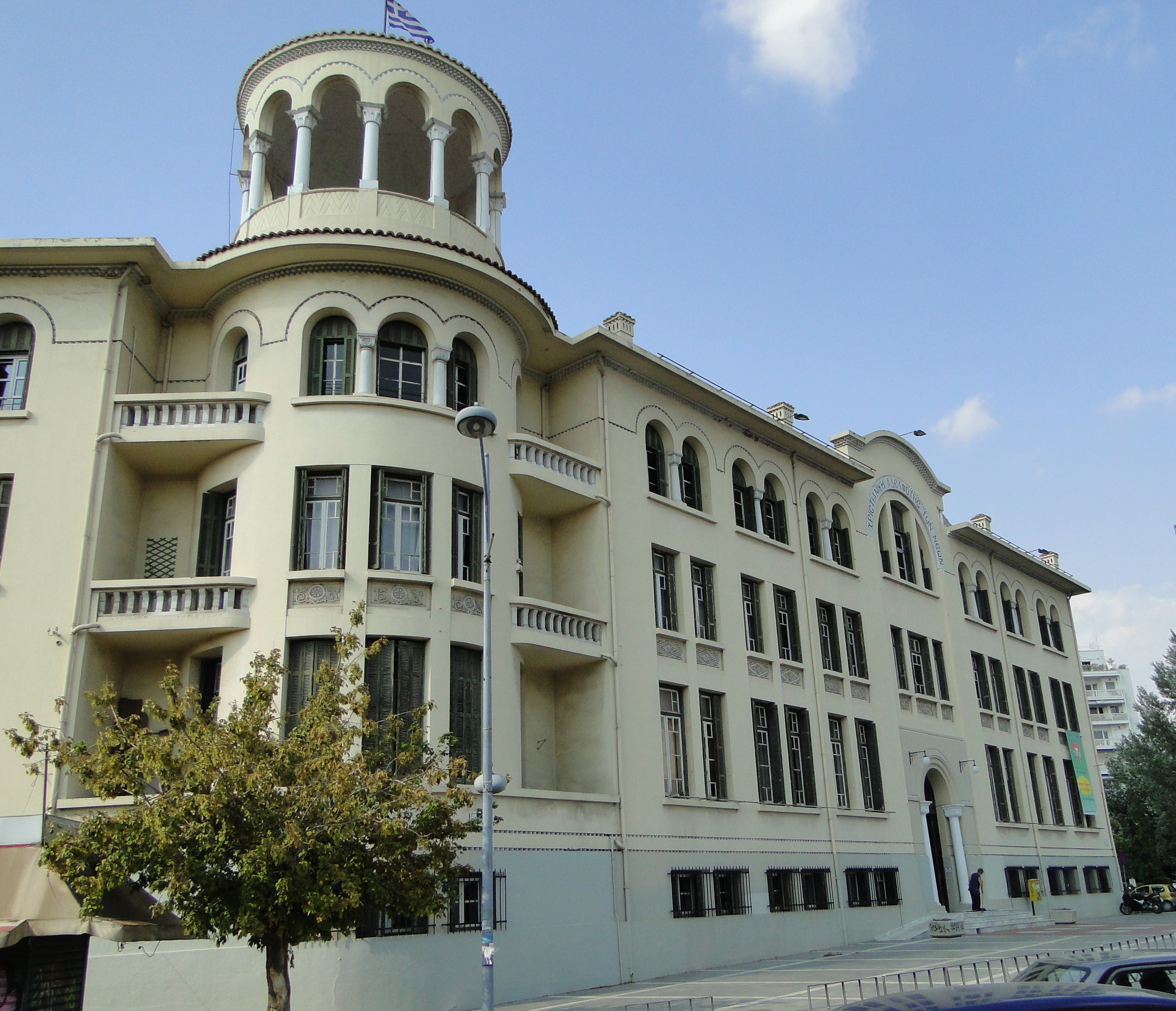
The YMCA building as seen from the park

=== Cultural Importance ===
The gym area is a popular meeting place among gym enthusiasts and parkour athletes. Many events and demonstrations mainly regarding the environment have taken place in the park.

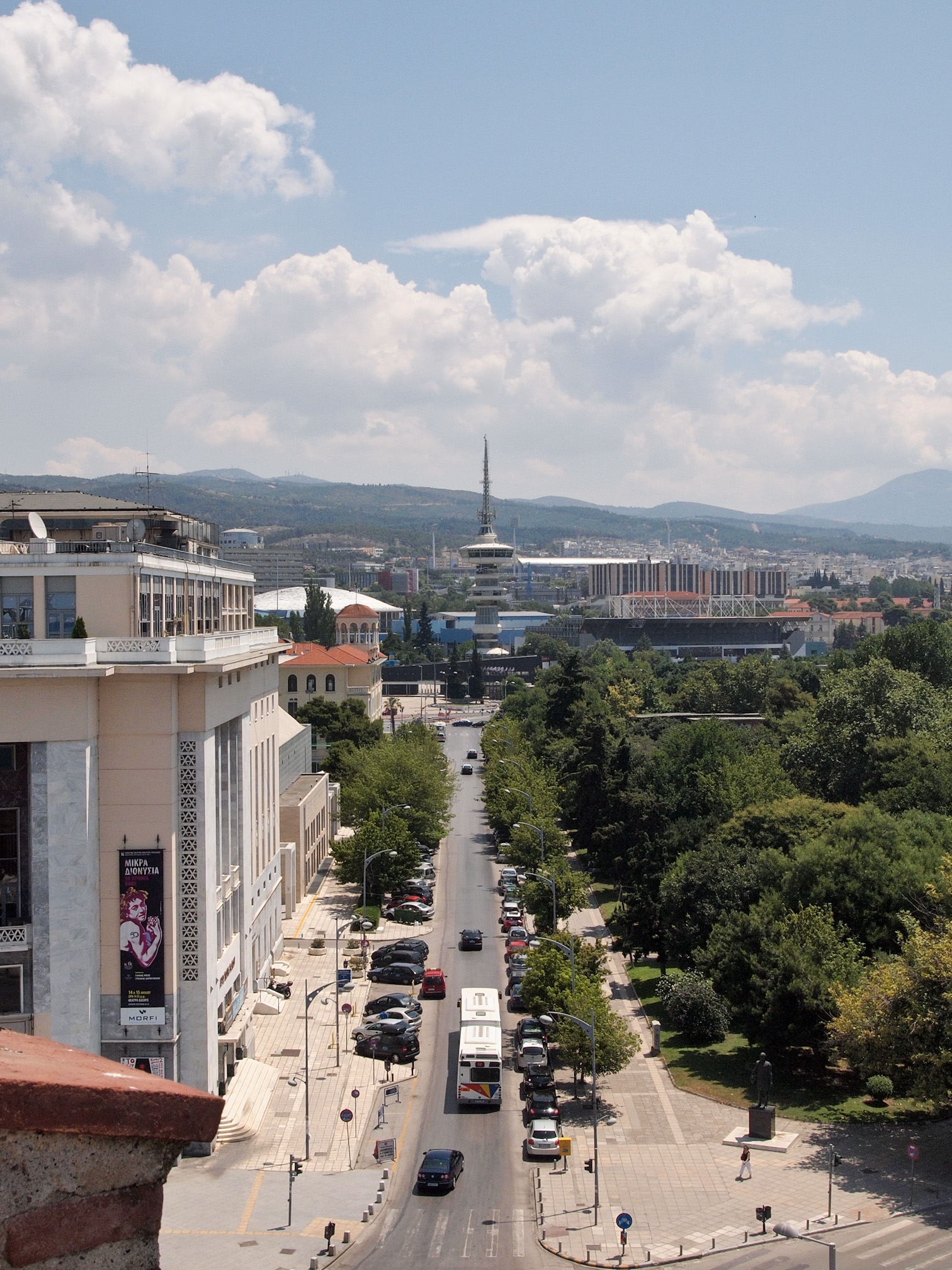
The Park with the International Trade Fair in the background
