= Petropoulaki =

- Settlement
- Location within Greece
- Coordinates: 40°21′58″N 21°7′17″E
- Country: Greece
- Geographic region: Macedonia
- Administrative region: Western Macedonia
- Regional unit: Kastoria
- Municipality: Argos Orestiko
- Municipal unit: Argos Orestiko
- Community: Melanthio

Population (2021)
  - Total: 12
- Time zone: UTC+2 (EET)
  - Summer (DST): UTC+3 (EEST)

Petropoulaki (Greek: Πετροπουλάκι, before 1926: Έζερετς – Ezerets) is a village in Kastoria Regional Unit, Macedonia, Greece. It is part of the community of Melanthio.

In 1945, Greek Foreign Minister Ioannis Politis ordered the compilation of demographic data regarding the Prefecture of Kastoria. The village Petropoulaki had a total of 313 inhabitants, and was populated by 300 Slavophones with 30 percent having a Bulgarian national consciousness.
