= Militsa, Kastoria =

Militsa
- Community
- Location within Greece
- Coordinates: 40°27′12″N 21°19′49″E
- Country: Greece
- Geographic region: Macedonia
- Administrative region: Western Macedonia
- Regional unit: Kastoria
- Municipality: Argos Orestiko
- Municipal unit: Ion Dragoumis

Population (2021)
  - Community: 286
- Time zone: UTC+2 (EET)
  - Summer (DST): UTC+3 (EEST)

Militsa (Greek: Μηλίτσα, before 1926: Σλήμιτσα – Slimitsa) is a village and a community in Kastoria Regional Unit, Western Macedonia, Greece. The village has an altitude of 650 m (2,130 ft).

The population of Militsa was 406 in 1940, 390 in 1951 and 396 in 1961.
