= Zevgostasi =

- Settlement
- Location within Greece
- Coordinates: 40°22′59.9″N 21°10′0.1″E
- Country: Greece
- Geographic region: Macedonia
- Administrative region: Western Macedonia
- Regional unit: Kastoria
- Municipality: Argos Orestiko
- Municipal unit: Argos Orestiko
- Community: Spilaia

Population (2011)
  - Total: 6
- Time zone: UTC+2 (EET)
  - Summer (DST): UTC+3 (EEST)

Zevgostasi (Greek: Ζευγοστάσι, before 1927: Δόλιανη – Doliani) is a village in Kastoria Regional Unit, Macedonia, Greece. It is part of the community of Spilaia.

In 1945, Greek Foreign Minister Ioannis Politis ordered the compilation of demographic data regarding the Prefecture of Kastoria. The village Zevgostasi had a total of 170 inhabitants, all Slavophones without a Bulgarian national consciousness.
