= Folklore Museum (Kastanofyto) =

Museum in Kastanofyto, Greece

- Established: 1972
- Location: Megalou Alexandrou St., Kastanofyto, Kastoria
- Coordinates: 40.3628°N 21.1558°E
- Website: www.museumsofmacedonia.gr/Folklore/Laografiko_Kastanofyto.html

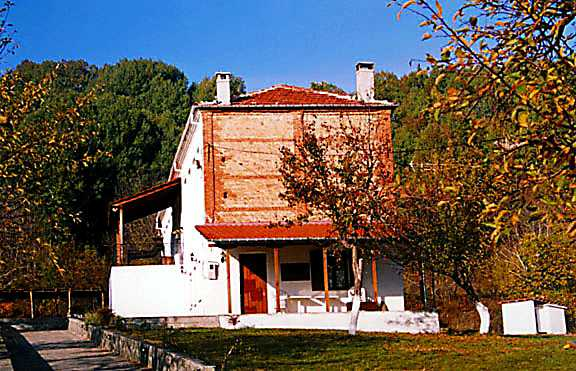
Outside view of the Museum

The folklore museum in Kastanofyto was set up in 1994 by the Kastanofyto Cultural Association in the building that used to house the primary school. The museum was established to preserve objects associated with the folk tradition so that generations to come will be able to learn about folk culture. All the exhibits come from the village itself.

== Location ==
The museum is based in Kastanofyto - a small traditional mountain village approximately 30 km from Kastoria, Greece in the direction of Argos Orestiko.

== Holdings ==
The first room has a display of photographs illustrating aspects of the villagers everyday life and such major social events as weddings, baptisms, national holidays, and school rallies. There are also quite a number of photographs of officers and soldiers of the Republican Army of Greece (DSE), because the village was the DSEs base in 1946–7.

The second room houses genuine traditional womens costumes of the late 19th century (everyday wear and bridal outfits), woven textiles, embroidery, a number of objects for everyday domestic use (cauldrons, baking trays, cooking-pots, and plates), agricultural implements (most notably a hand plough), millstones, a wooden barrel for collecting grain at the mill, and jars for the pickles and cereals that were stored in the cellars in winter.

The ground floor has been converted into a guest-house for visitors to the area.

== Gallery ==
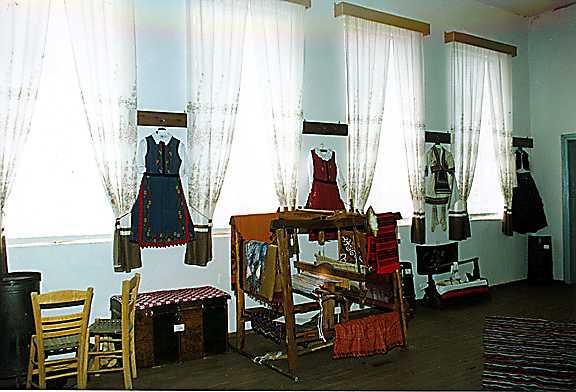
A classic loom and traditional costumes

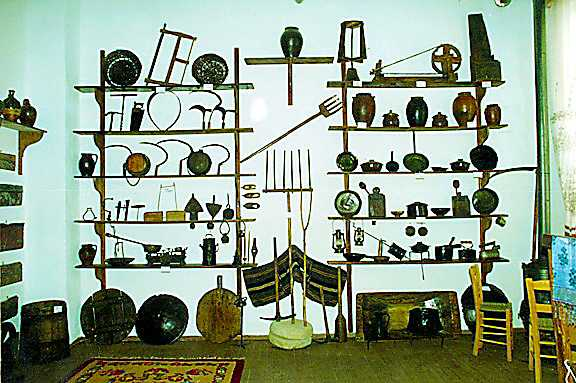
Household and agricultural implements

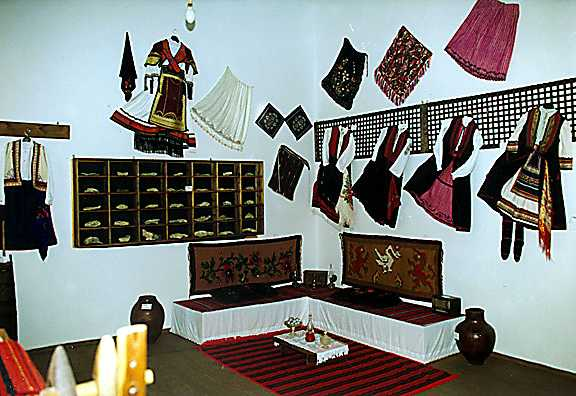
Traditional womens costumes (19th century)

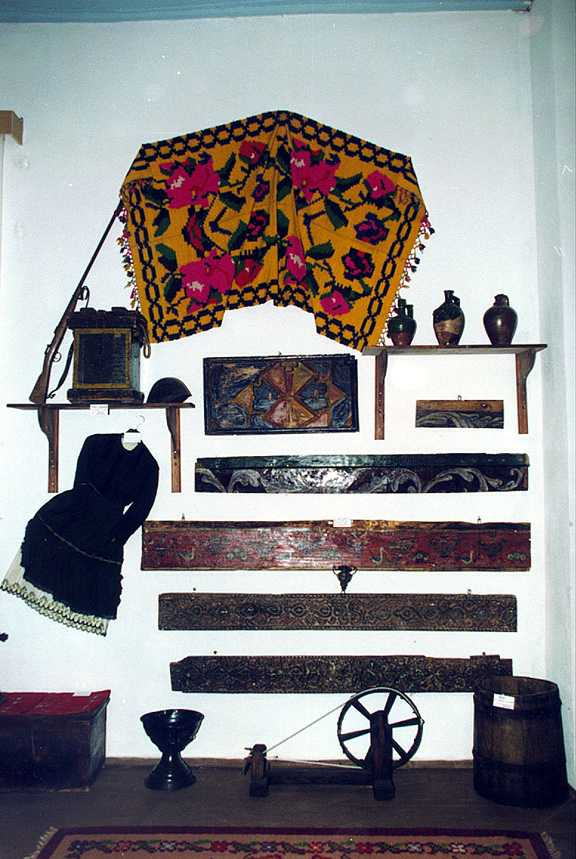
Woodcut exhibits

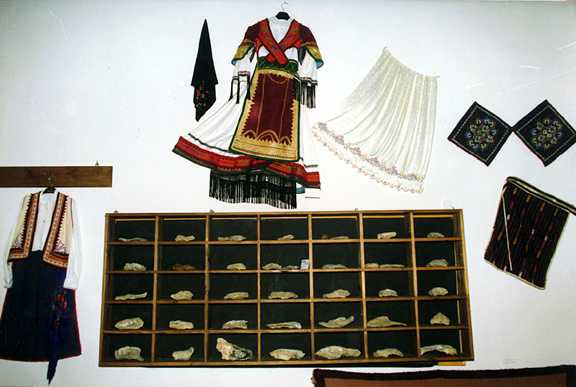
Palaeontological Exhibits
