= Nikolaos Zorbas =

Hellanic Army officer (1844–1920)

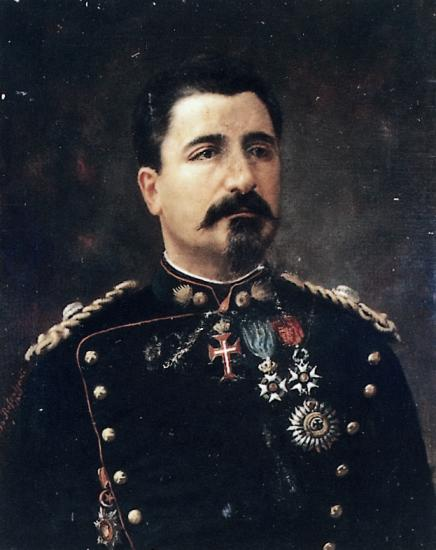
- Zorbas as an artillery major. Portrait by Spyridon Prosalentis.

Minister of Military Affairs
- In office 31 January 1910 – 18 October 1910
- Monarch: George I
- Prime Minister: Stefanos Dragoumis

Personal details
- Born: 27 September 1844 Athens, Kingdom of Greece
- Died: 11 June 1920 (aged 75) Athens, Kingdom of Greece
- Education: Hellenic Army Academy
- Awards: Order of the Redeemer; Legion of Honour

Military service
- Allegiance: Kingdom of Greece
- Branch/service: Hellenic Army
- Years of service: ?–1911
- Rank: Major General
- Battles/wars: Greco-Turkish War (1897); Goudi Coup

Nikolaos Zorbas (Greek: Νικόλαος Ζορμπάς; 1844–1920) was a Greek soldier, most notable as the nominal leader of the Military League which organized the Goudi coup in 1909.

== Life ==
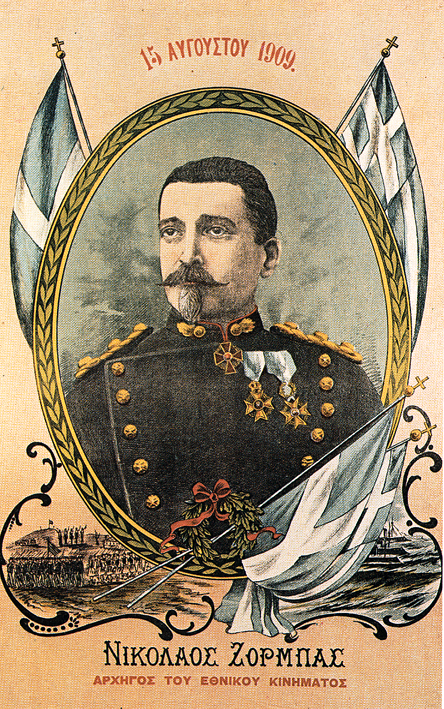
A portrait of Zorbas commemorating the Goudi coup.

His family was from Magnesia in Asia Minor and he was born in Athens. After studying at the Hellenic Army Academy, he finished his studies in France and Belgium. He fought during the Greco-Turkish War (1897), and in 1909, as a colonel, he was chosen as the leader of the clandestine Military League. After the league organized the Goudi coup in August 1909, he was appointed Minister of Military Affairs in the Stephanos Dragoumis government and retired in 1911 as a Major General.

Zorbas died in Athens.
