= Niki, Kastoria =

Niki
- Settlement
- Location within Greece
- Coordinates: 40°22′44″N 21°6′19″E
- Country: Greece
- Geographic region: Macedonia
- Administrative region: Western Macedonia
- Regional unit: Kastoria
- Municipality: Argos Orestiko
- Municipal unit: Argos Orestiko
- Community: Melanthio

Population (2021)
  - Total: 20
- Time zone: UTC+2 (EET)
  - Summer (DST): UTC+3 (EEST)

Niki (Greek: Νίκη, before 1954: Βύτσιστα – Vytsista) is a village in Kastoria Regional Unit, Macedonia, Greece. It is part of the community of Melanthio.

Vytsista was populated by Muslim Albanians of the Bektashi Order. The 1920 Greek census recorded 318 people in the village and 250 inhabitants (35 families) were Muslim in 1923. Following the Greek–Turkish population exchange, Greek refugee families in Vytsista were from Asia Minor (1) and Pontus (39) in 1926. The 1928 Greek census recorded 123 inhabitants. In 1928, the refugee families numbered 38 (131 people). After the population exchange, the Pontian refugees converted the small tekke in the village into a church.
