= Melanthio, Kastoria =

Melanthio
- Community
- Location within Greece
- Coordinates: 40°23′45″N 21°7′45″E
- Country: Greece
- Geographic region: Macedonia
- Administrative region: Western Macedonia
- Regional unit: Kastoria
- Municipality: Argos Orestiko
- Municipal unit: Argos Orestiko

Population (2021)
  - Community: 104
- Time zone: UTC+2 (EET)
  - Summer (DST): UTC+3 (EEST)

Melanthio (Greek: Μελάνθιο, before 1927: Ζαμπύρδενη – Zampyrdeni) is a village and a community in Kastoria Regional Unit, Macedonia, Greece. The community consists of the villages Melanthio, Niki and Petropoulaki.

The 1920 Greek census recorded 592 people in the village, and 600 inhabitants (70 families) were Muslim in 1923. Following the Greek–Turkish population exchange, Greek refugee families in Zampyrdeni were from Pontus (69) in 1926. The 1928 Greek census recorded 320 village inhabitants. In 1928, the refugee families numbered 72 (309 people).
