= Dialekto, Kastoria =

Dialekto
- Community
- Location within Greece
- Coordinates: 40°23′39″N 21°18′25″E
- Country: Greece
- Geographic region: Macedonia
- Administrative region: Western Macedonia
- Regional unit: Kastoria
- Municipality: Argos Orestiko
- Municipal unit: Argos Orestiko

Population (2021)
  - Community: 25
- Time zone: UTC+2 (EET)
  - Summer (DST): UTC+3 (EEST)

Dialekto (Greek: Διαλεκτό, before 1955: Μόλαση – Molasi) is a village and a community in Kastoria Regional Unit, Macedonia, Greece. The community consists of the villages Dialekto and Velos.
