= Paleontological and Paleobotanical Museum (Nostimo) =

Fossil exhibition in Greece

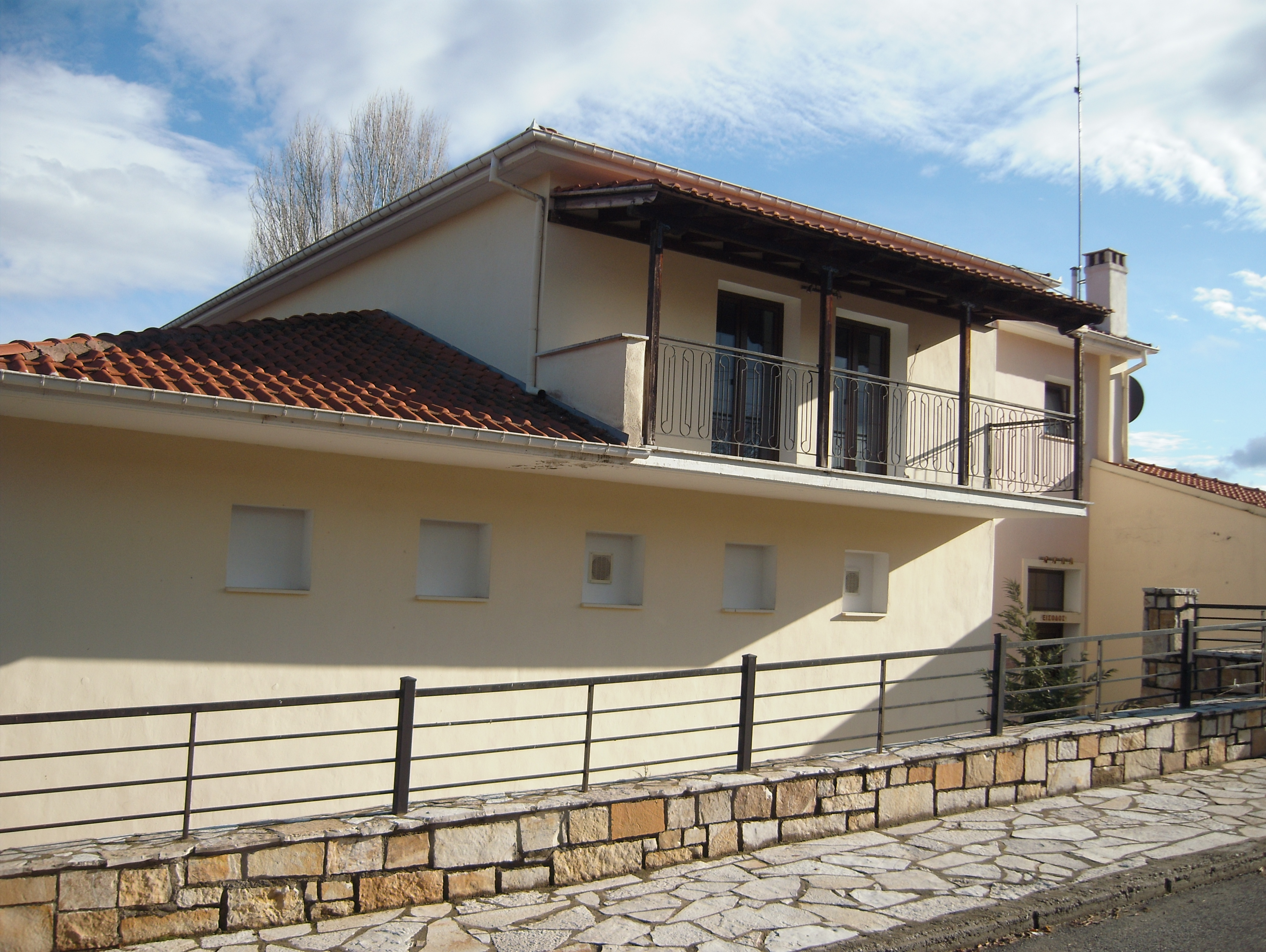
Outside view of the museum

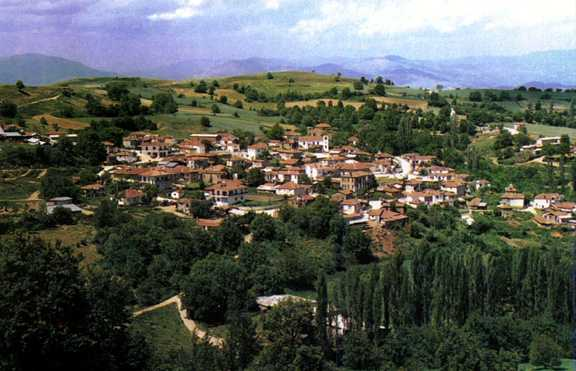
Nostimo village

The Paleontological and Paleobotanical Museum (Greek: Μουσείο Παλαιοντολογίας και Παλαιοβοτανικής Νόστιμου) at Nostimo is an exhibition of fossils in a village in Western Macedonia, Greece. The village of Nostimo is 25 km from the city of Kastoria and 14 km from the town of Argos Orestiko.

Since 2010, fossils and artifacts from the nearby petrified forest have been displayed in the village junior school. The playground has been converted into a park of petrified tree trunks. A relatively spacious room inside the school has on display fossils of marine invertebrates, fish, and mammals, as well as some ancient artifacts.

== The fossils ==
The tree trunks, 5–10 m long and 40–80 cm in diameter, come from the Nostimo Petrified Forest, which consists chiefly of tropical and subtropical plants. The forest grew in deltaic alluvial deposits of the prehistoric Tethys Ocean, which washed the wider area of Kastoria. The fossilised trees are of Early Miocene age (15 to 20 million years old), and are in excellent condition; most of them are palm trees.

The marine fossils consist of starfish, sea urchins, conches, whelks, scallops, mussels, other seashells, and other marine invertebrate fossils that are in near perfect condition. The vertebrate fossils include a jaw and teeth of a shark that was 20–25 m long, and a Late Pliocene (3.5 million years old) tooth of an Anancus arvenensis, a mastodon, an ancient relative of the elephant, which has been recognised here for the first time in the wider area of Western Macedonia. The mastodon which lived in this area was about the same size as a modern elephant, but with longer tusks.

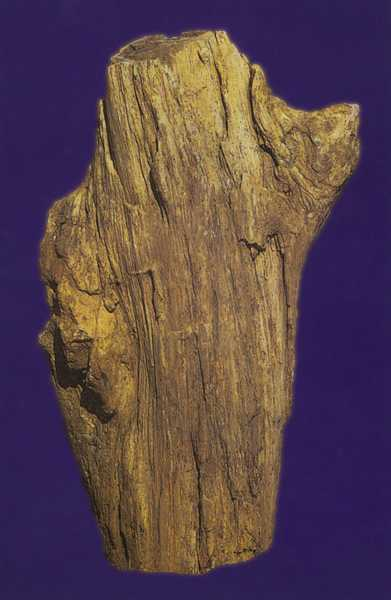
Fossil tree trunk

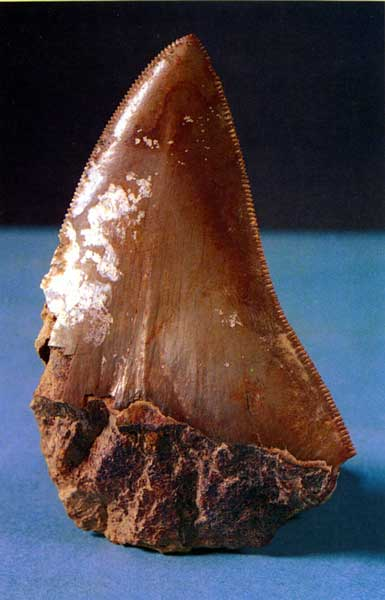
A tooth of a large shark

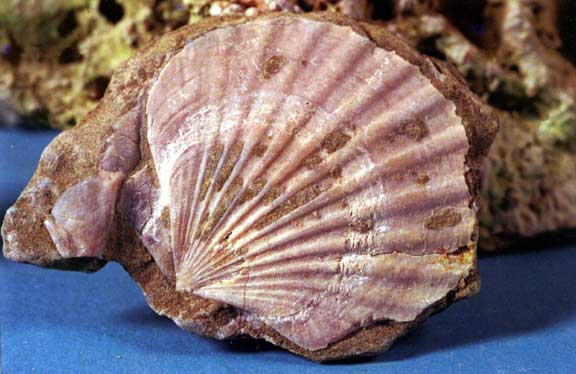
Fossil scallop

== The artifacts ==
Also displayed are some Neolithic tools (from the 4th millennium BC): a fishing weight, and a blade for harvesting crops.
