= Ammoudara, Kastoria =

Ammoudara
- Community
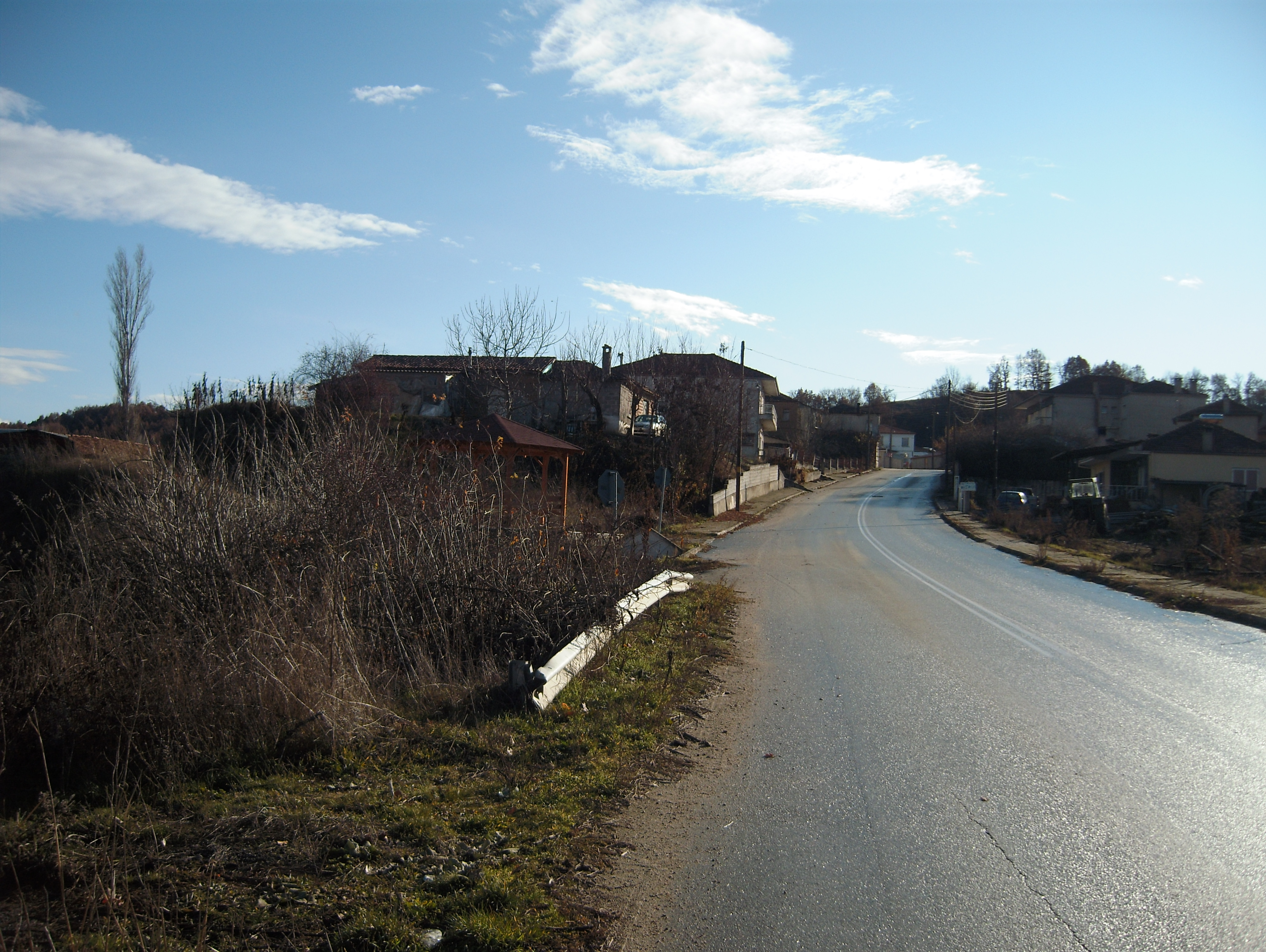

- Location within Greece
- Coordinates: 40°25′24″N 21°16′44″E
- Country: Greece
- Geographic region: Macedonia
- Administrative region: Western Macedonia
- Regional unit: Kastoria
- Municipality: Argos Orestiko
- Municipal unit: Argos Orestiko

Population (2021)
  - Community: 203
- Time zone: UTC+2 (EET)
  - Summer (DST): UTC+3 (EEST)

Ammoudara (Greek: Αμμουδάρα, before 1926: Πισιάκοι – Pisiakoi; Bulgarian: Песяк) is a village and a community in Kastoria Regional Unit, Macedonia, Greece. The community consists of the villages Ammoudara, Ampelochori and Votani.

In 1945, Greek Foreign Minister Ioannis Politis ordered the compilation of demographic data regarding the Prefecture of Kastoria. The village Ammoudara had a total of 240 inhabitants, populated by 120 Slavophones without a Bulgarian national consciousness.
