= Hellas (personification) =

Personification of Greece

Hellas or Ellada is the personification of the nation of Greece, dating back to Ancient Greece. There was a desire for unification in Greece, and Hellas is the only national personification known from that period. She is mentioned frequently in literature but only appears once in the arts of late classical Athens.

== Description ==
Hellas is usually depicted as a woman who wears simple clothes similar to ancient Greek clothes. On her head, she wears a crown or an olive wreath.

Pictures of Greece
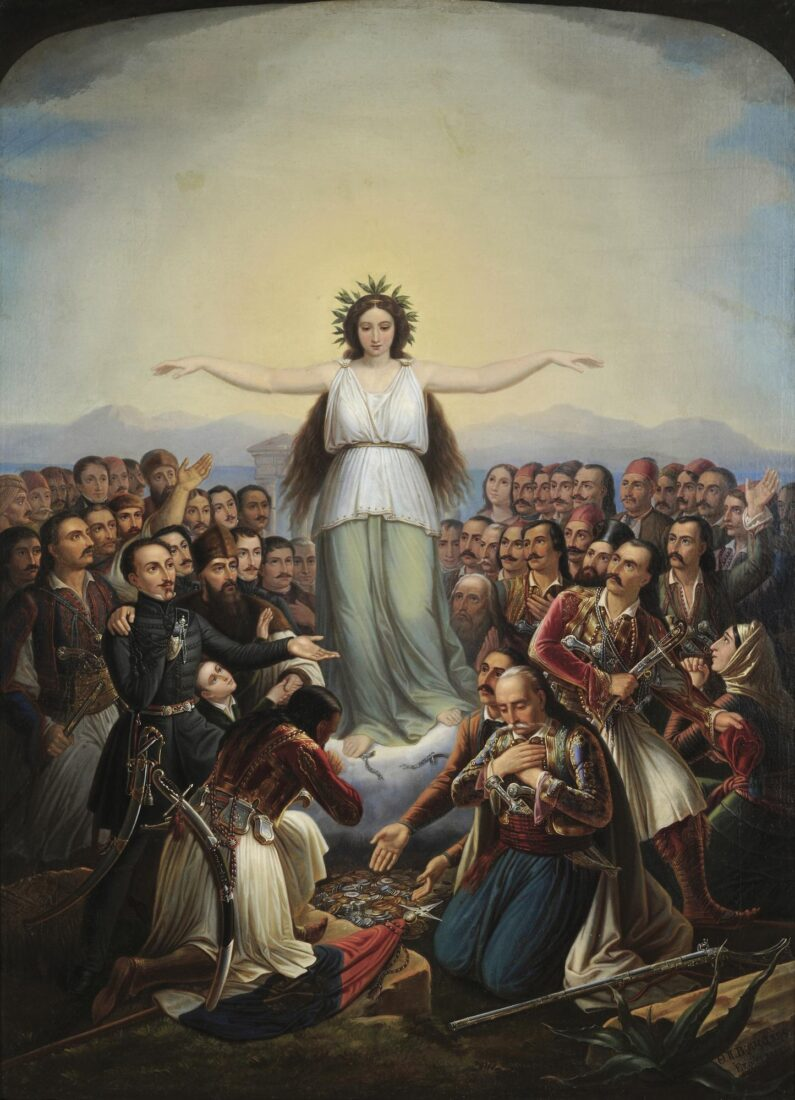
Greece personified as a woman, with revolutionaries participating in the Greek War of Independence.

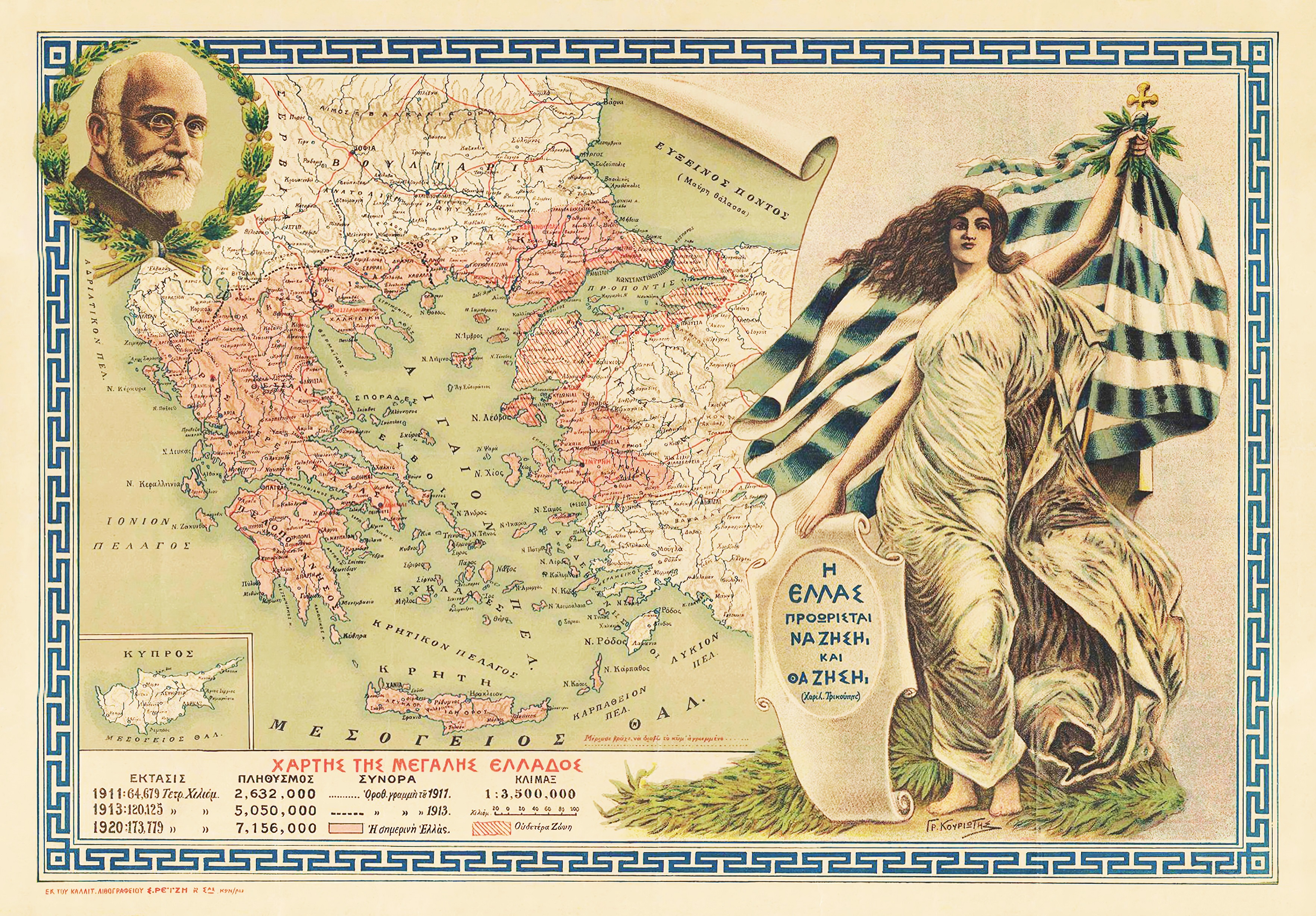
Great Greece under Eleftherios Venizelos

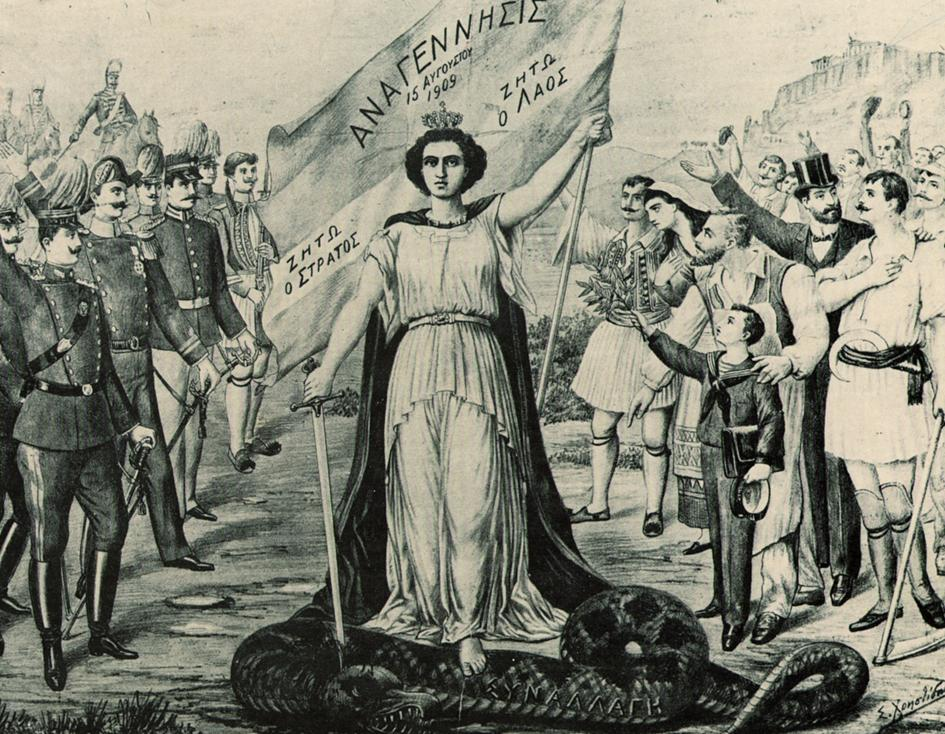
Rebirth of Greece after Goudi coup

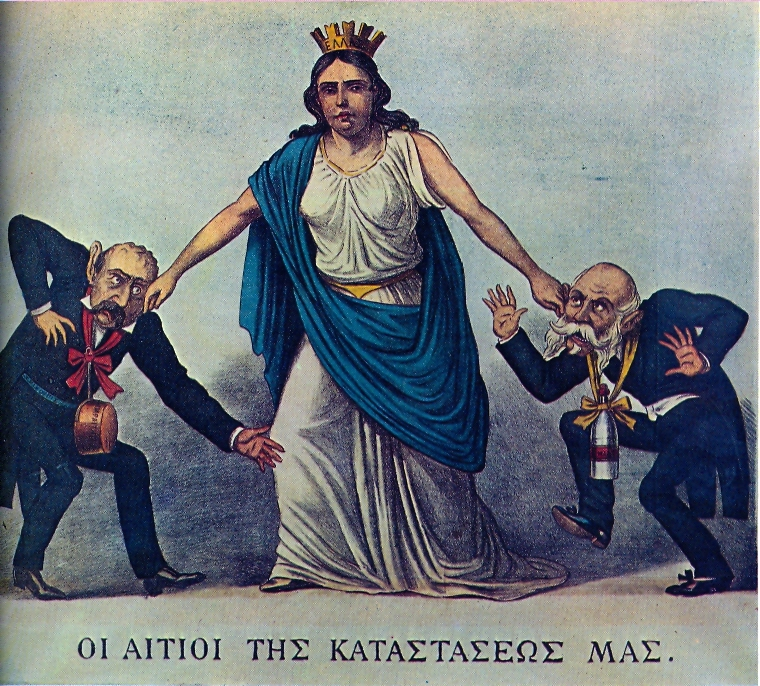
Greece pulling the ears of Charilaos Trikoupis and Theodoros Deligiannis

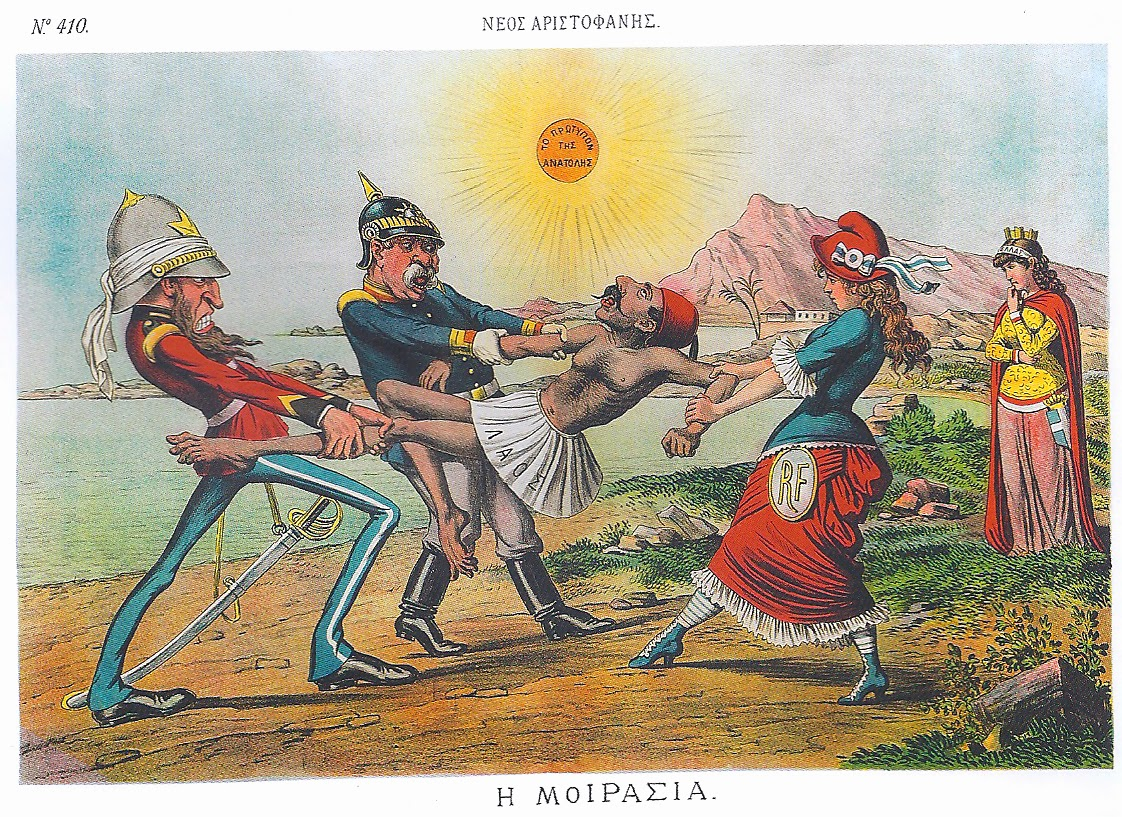
Greece watches how Germany, England, and France pull the Greek people.
