= Kastanofyto =

- Community
- Location within Greece
- Coordinates: 40°21′43″N 21°9′22″E
- Country: Greece
- Geographic region: Macedonia
- Administrative region: Western Macedonia
- Regional unit: Kastoria
- Municipality: Argos Orestiko
- Municipal unit: Argos Orestiko

Population (2021)
  - Community: 22
- Time zone: UTC+2 (EET)
  - Summer (DST): UTC+3 (EEST)

Kastanofyto (Greek: Καστανόφυτο, before 1927: Οσνίτσανη – Osnitsani) is a village and a community in Kastoria Regional Unit, Macedonia, Greece. The village has a folklore museum.

In 1945, Greek Foreign Minister Ioannis Politis ordered the compilation of demographic data regarding the Prefecture of Kastoria. The village Kastanofyto had a total of 482 inhabitants, and was populated by 241 Slavophones without a Bulgarian national consciousness.

By 2011, the population had dropped to only 44 permanent inhabitants and dropped further to 12 inhabitants by 2021. The village is in a major chestnut growing region and hosts a chestnut festival every October.
