= Spilaia =

- Community
- Location within Greece
- Coordinates: 40°24′16″N 21°10′39″E
- Country: Greece
- Geographic region: Macedonia
- Administrative region: Western Macedonia
- Regional unit: Kastoria
- Municipality: Argos Orestiko
- Municipal unit: Argos Orestiko

Population (2021)
  - Community: 27
- Time zone: UTC+2 (EET)
  - Summer (DST): UTC+3 (EEST)

Spilaia (Greek: Σπήλαια, before 1928: Ζούζιλτσα – Zouziltsa) is a village and a community in Kastoria Regional Unit, Macedonia, Greece. The community consists of the villages Spilaia and Zevgostasi.

In 1945, Greek Foreign Minister Ioannis Politis ordered the compilation of demographic data regarding the Prefecture of Kastoria. The village Spilaia had a total of 256 inhabitants, and was populated by 240 Slavophones without a Bulgarian national consciousness.
