= Goudi coup =

1909 coup d'état in Greece

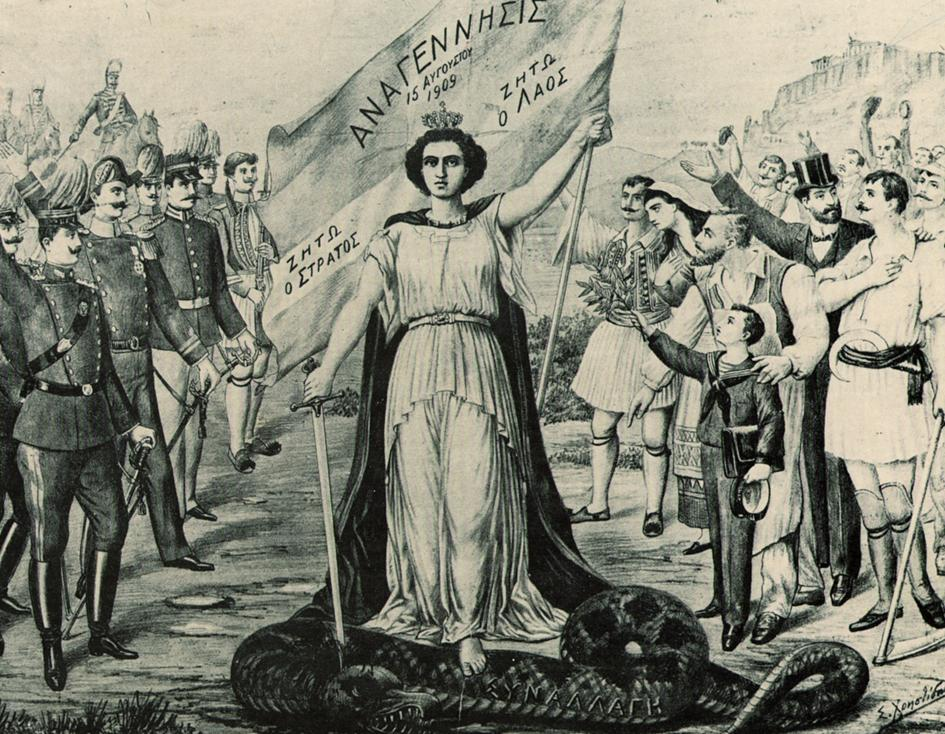
- A well-known lithograph depicting Greece triumphantly stepping over a dead, serpent-like monster symbolizing the old party system, with the army (on the left) and the people (on the right) celebrating.
Date	28 August [O.S. 15 August] 1909
Location	Goudi, Athens 37°59′18″N 23°46′33″E
Result	Coup successful; Prime Minister Dimitrios Rallis resigns, King George I appoints Kyriakoulis Mavromichalis as his replacement; Coup insurgents hold large public demonstration the following month after demands not met; Assembly on constitutional revision called, Military League dissolved, Prime Minister Kyriakoulis Mavromichalis resigns, Stefanos Dragoumis appointed interim prime minister until new elections; Liberal Party led by Eleftherios Venizelos of Crete wins supermajority in elections in November 1910; New reformist constitution promulgated; Rise of Venizelism

Belligerents
Government of Greece	Military League

Commanders and leaders
George I Dimitrios Rallis	Nikolaos Zorbas

The Goudi coup (Greek: κίνημα στο Γουδί, romanized: kinima sto Goudi) was a military coup d'état by a group of military officers that took place on the night of 28 August [O.S. 15 August] 1909, at the barracks in Goudi, located on the eastern outskirts of Athens, Greece. The coup was pivotal in modern Greek history, ending the old political system and ushering in a new period for Greece.

The coup occurred under simmering tensions in Greek society, which reeled under the effects of a lack of necessary reforms and financial troubles that had been exacerbated by the defeat in the Greco-Turkish War of 1897. Emulating the Young Turks, several junior army officers founded a secret society, the Military League. With Colonel Nikolaos Zorbas as their figurehead, on the night of 15 August, the Military League, having gathered its troops in the Goudi barracks, issued a pronunciamiento to the government, demanding an immediate turnaround for the country and its armed forces.

King George I gave in and replaced Prime Minister Dimitrios Rallis with Kyriakoulis Mavromichalis. However, this did not satisfy the insurgents, who resorted to a large public demonstration the following month. When a stalemate was reached, the coup leaders appealed to a new figure, Cretan Eleftherios Venizelos, who respected democratic norms in calling for new elections. After his allies' twin victories in the Hellenic Parliament in August and November 1910, Venizelos became prime minister and proceeded to enact numerous social and military reforms, including those demanded by the coup's instigators. In the following years, Venizelos' popular leadership dominated the Greek discourse and eventually challenged the institution of monarchy. For the next several decades, Greek political life was dominated by two opposing forces: Venizelism, characterized by liberal and republican ideals, and its opposite, anti-Venizelism, characterized by conservative and pro-monarchy ideals.

== Greece at the beginning of the 20th century ==
The Congress of Berlin in 1878 and the 1881 Convention of Constantinople had been successes for Greek diplomacy. There, the country had won Thessaly and a part of Epirus. In order to continue achieving the Megali Idea, Greece then turned to Macedonia and Crete, but met with severe setbacks.

=== Military defeats ===
In 1895, following the Hamidian massacres of Armenians in the Ottoman Empire, Cretan Christians—who were still under Ottoman rule—demanded self-government on their island, seeking the protection of the great powers. As massacres of Christians by Muslims escalated, Greece intervened, first by allowing volunteers to depart from its shores and later by increasingly deploying part of its fleet. By early 1897, Greece sent troops to Crete, coinciding with the Cretan declaration of a union with Greece, "Εnosis" (Greek: Ένωσης). The European powers (France, Great Britain, Italy, Russia, Austria-Hungary, and Germany) forced Greece to retreat. The opposition criticized the government's weakness and indecision, especially when Greece declared war on the Ottomans in April. The resulting conflict, known as (the Thirty Days' War), lasted a month and ended in a Greek defeat. Though Greece lost only a small amount of territory along its northern border, it was compelled to pay significant war reparations—4 million Ottoman pounds—to the victorious Ottomans. Coming shortly after Greece's declaration of public insolvency in 1893, this defeat led to the establishment of an International Financial Commission which had access to Greece's key revenue sources, such as state monopolies and port customs tariffs, to repay its public debt. Meanwhile, Crete became an autonomous state under international supervision, though it remained under the suzerainty of the Ottoman sultan.

=== Macedonia ===
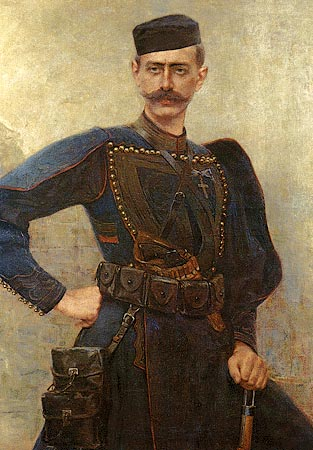
Pavlos Melas in traditional Makedonomakhos costume, by Georgios Jakobides

Macedonia was a region disputed between Greece, the Ottoman Empire and Bulgaria (created at the Congress of Berlin). On 2 August [O.S. 20 July] 1903, the feast day of the prophet Elijah (Bulg. Ilinden), the Ilinden–Preobrazhenie Uprising, sponsored by the Internal Macedonian Revolutionary Organization, began. The uprising failed, and Turkish reprisals were severe, with 2,000 killed and villages and homes razed. Following these events, many Greeks became concerned with the level of Bulgarian activity in Macedonia. The Ethniki Etairia (National Society) was set up, which sent armed bands of Greeks (makedonomakhoi), tacitly aided by the government in Athens, which provided financial support through its consular agents such as Ion Dragoumis and training from military advisers such as Pavlos Melas. This began what is known in Greece as the "Macedonian Struggle", where Greeks clashed with Bulgarian komitadjis, while both sides clashed with the Ottoman army and gendarmerie. Reprisals took many forms, including pillage, arson and assassination. Deeply concerned, the Western powers decided to intervene. The eventual plan was for an administrative reorganisation of the region that would allow for an ethnic-based partition. Thus, each of the ethnic groups concerned sought to strengthen its position so as to gain a maximum of territory when the potential partition came. The successes and sacrifices of young officers such as Melas restored the image of part of the army. In turn, the meddling of the European powers in internal Ottoman affairs contributed to the outbreak of the Young Turk Revolution of July 1908, which put an end to the Greek-Bulgarian clashes in Macedonia.

=== Consequences of the Young Turk revolution ===
Greece, at the time, was still embroiled in the Cretan question. In 1905, Eleftherios Venizelos had led the Theriso revolt against High Commissioner George of Greece, who had been appointed by the European powers, and demanded enosis. In 1906, the Prince resigned, and a new commissioner, the former Greek prime minister Alexandros Zaimis, was installed. The Young Turk Revolution pushed the Cretans to unilaterally proclaim definitive enosis, taking advantage of the absence of the new high commissioner.

Anti-Greek demonstrations took place in Turkey, where the press launched a similar campaign. The European powers displayed hostility toward Greece, while Georgios Theotokis' government was subjected to increasing criticism. His replacement with Rallis had little effect. The new prime minister hastened to show signs of goodwill toward the Turkish ambassador and the Western powers. Wishing to avoid a new Greco-Turkish war, he criticised the "Cretan revolutionaries" and declared his willingness to abide by the Great Powers' decisions. Indignation toward the government's weaknesses and timorous attitude mounted, among the populace as well as in the army, above all among the young officers who had fought in Macedonia. The idea of imitating the Young Turk officers began to spread.

=== Economic and social situation ===
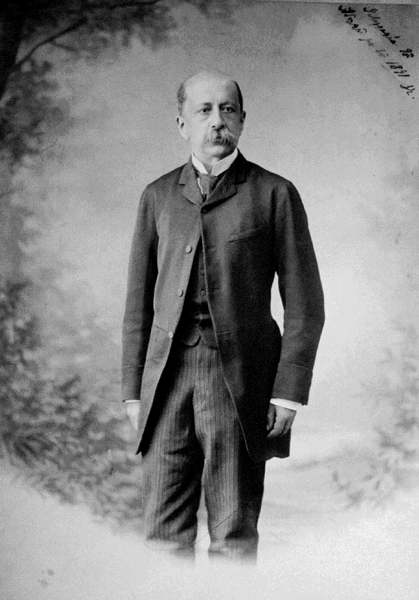
Charilaos Trikoupis

Greece had been in an economic crisis for decades. Public debt (owed above all to the Great Powers) dating back to the war of independence reached new heights in the 1890s. At that point, the government of Charilaos Trikoupis recognised that the country was bankrupt by deciding to lower the public debt to 30% of its value, which angered the creditors, particularly the European powers. At the same time, export of the Zante currant entered a crisis. A new phenomenon then began: emigration of the working population. The number of emigrants (especially to the United States) went from 1,108 in 1890 to 39,135 in 1910 (of 2.8 million inhabitants); significantly, remittances from America and Egypt fell amid the economic slowdown in 1908. Economic growth was too slow for the workers and farmers who left to seek work elsewhere. Until that time, only highlanders and landless island dwellers had left. However, this economic growth did lead to the creation, as elsewhere in Europe in the same period, of a middle class born out of industrial development, of growth in the number of bureaucrats (linked to political clientelism), and to an urban explosion. In the mid-1900s, this middle class could not understand why the country was prosperous while the state's finances were in such poor shape. Politicians, also dissatisfied with government policy, reacted as well. In 1906, a group of young radicals nicknamed the "Japanese Group" (Ομάς Ιαπώνων), in reference to the dynamism of the Meiji period or their aggressive tactics in parliament (calling to mind the Japanese army's performance in the recent Russo-Japanese War), formed around the titular leadership of Stephanos Dragoumis, with Dimitrios Gounaris its moving spirit. It criticised the old oligarchy that was ruining the country and demanded radical reforms. The group of "Sociologists" (Κοινωνιολόγοι), especially influenced by Marxism, also called for modernisation of the state apparatus and the economy.

== Coup ==
=== Military League ===
The Military League (Στρατιωτικός Σύνδεσμος) was formed in October 1908 out of two groups: one of army NCOs (with members including future generals Nikolaos Plastiras and Georgios Kondylis) and one of junior officers around Theodoros Pangalos. They were motivated by a variety of reasons: a desire for reforms that was prevalent in wide parts of society was combined with frustration at the slow rate of promotions and the absence of meritocracy, especially among graduates of the military academy. Other officers from the army, the navy and the gendarmerie joined up later, and by June 1909, had spread out over the Greek military.

At that time the Military League's demands were limited to an increased military budget, its reorganisation and modernisation, as well as the dismissal of the princes from the army. Although the Theotokis government had increased supplies of arms and munitions, he had also reinstated Crown Prince Constantine, who had led the army in the 1897 war, as chief inspector of the army. Also, despite demands, he had authorised only a few officers to pursue further studies in France and Germany.

=== Army action ===
The Military League, now numbering about 1,300, began by engaging in a form of lobbying by putting pressure on those in power. It had already scored a success with the July 1909 resignation of Theotokis, its bête noire and a symbol of the parliamentary clientelism it hated. But his successor, Dimitrios Rallis, immediately alienated the league by paying tribute to Constantine's major role in the war of 1897, by recalling all officers present in Macedonia, by demanding Great Power intervention in Crete and by arresting over a dozen of the league's members for insubordination on 12 August.

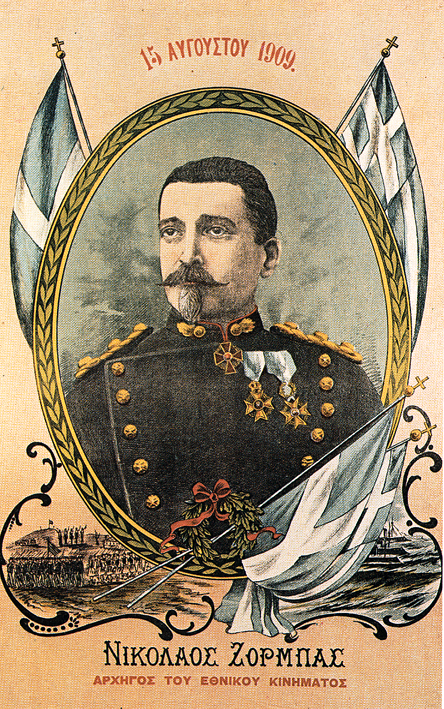
Contemporary lithograph celebrating Colonel Nikolaos Zorbas as leader of the "National Movement"

The arrest of league officers precipitated events: either the league would act now, or it would be dissolved by a government. The league searched for support among the senior officers, and Colonel Nikolaos Zorbas was chosen as its figurehead. On 14 August, Pangalos liberated two of the arrested officers, thereby provoking Rallis into ordering a clampdown and the arrest of all league members.

On the same night, the league set in motion its bloodless coup. The league members were gathered in the Goudi barracks: several hundred junior officers, non-commissioned officers, simple soldiers, gendarmes and civilians threatened to march on Athens if their demands were unmet. The armed forces, in particular the young officers, sent Rallis' government a pronunciamento containing their demands (the previous day, Rallis had declined to receive a deputation seeking to hand over the manifesto). Part of it was purely internal in nature: for instance, the soldiers challenged the promotion system, with its limited prospects for advancement. Another part was political and demanded profound reforms in the country: in its political functioning, as well as social, economic and military. The troops called for naval and land rearmament, and asked that the navy and war ministers belong to the military. The insurgents did not call for the king's abdication or the abolition of the monarchy, remaining loyal subjects. Neither did they announce a military dictatorship or even wish to change the government. They respected the institutions of parliamentary government. However, the officers did demand that the royal princes, chiefly the Crown Prince Constantine, on whom they blamed the defeat of 1897, be relieved of their posts and expelled from the army. Finally, the league called for a lowering of tax burdens.

The prime minister opened pro forma negotiations with the revolutionaries who, in order to speed them up, resorted to the people of Athens.

=== Popular demands ===
A large popular demonstration, organised and supervised by the soldiers, took place in the streets of Athens on 14 September 1909. The demonstrators, who had come from Athens and the Piraeus, demanded the imposition of a revenue tax, protectionism, the granting of tenure to bureaucrats (so they would no longer depend on politicians for their jobs), better working conditions and the condemnation of usury. King George I, unwilling to follow in the footsteps of his predecessor Otto, who had been forced from the throne under similar circumstances in 1862, pushed Prime Minister Rallis to resign and replaced him with Kyriakoulis Mavromichalis.

=== Stalemate ===
The negotiations dragged on, and Colonel Zorbas lacked the political skills to keep up with the seasoned veterans on the government side. Mavromichalis, in securing passage of a large number of mildly reformist bills, implemented part of the programme demanded by the Military League, this time under threat of an actual military takeover. Thus, the general staff was reorganised, and those close to Constantine (such as Ioannis Metaxas) were removed while budget cuts were made in order to finance army modernisation. But his government clearly showed that the old system endured: only Finance Minister Athanasios Eftaxias had reformist ideas. With the revolution running out of steam, the league began to crumble. It was not a real political movement: its ideology and programme lacked coherence; its leaders were popular but unskilled. They were, above all, soldiers ill at ease outside their barracks. The league knew how to link its corporatist demands to public discontent by using populist and nationalist slogans, but it unsettled the bourgeoisie. Although it saw the necessity of modernising the country, the middle classes feared the drift towards a military dictatorship, which was considered deleterious to the regular progress of affairs.

=== Appeal to Venizelos ===
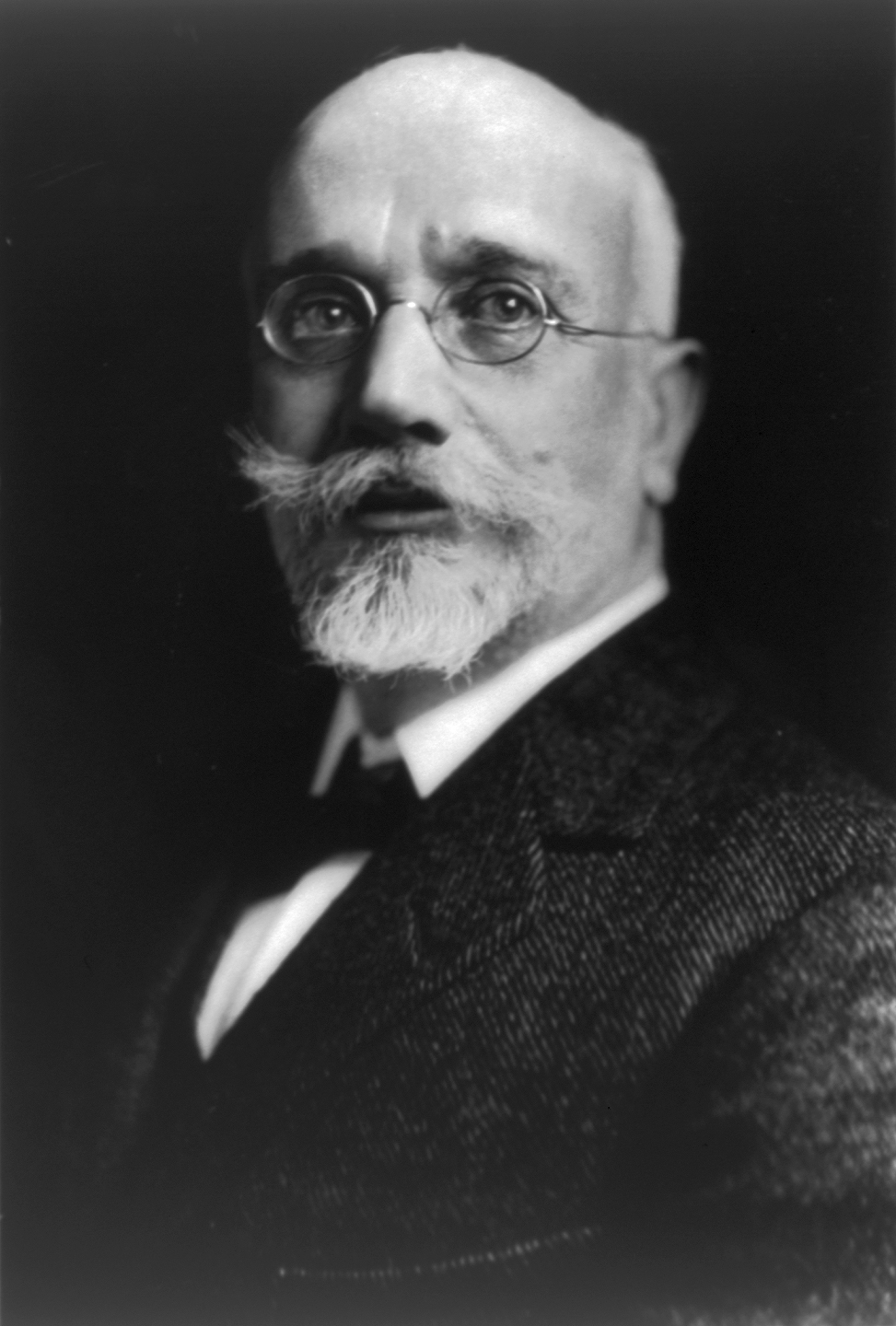
Eleftherios Venizelos

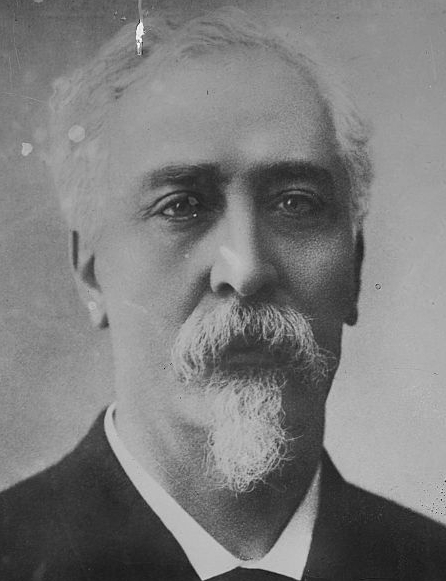
Stephanos Dragoumis

Some of the officers went to Crete, which they knew well, either from having participated in the earlier events or in the formation of its civil guard during the period of autonomy. There, they had also been able to see the political talents of the man who had been Prime Minister of Crete since 9 May 1909: Eleftherios Venizelos. When Prince George of Greece was High Commissioner of Crete, he had found himself in opposition to Venizelos. This gave the latter an anti-dynastic aura that attracted the Goudi insurgents; he was also seen as free from association with the mainland oligarchy's chaos, corruption, and incompetence. Starting in October 1909, they had sent him an emissary to sound out his intentions, also suggested to him that he take the office of Prime Minister of Greece. However, Venizelos did not wish to appear as the soldiers' man, either in Greece or abroad. Neither did he wish to clash head-on with King George I and the "old" political parties. He thus advised them to proceed with legislative elections and entrust implementation of the reform programme to the new assembly. He went to Athens on 28 December [O.S. 15 December] 1909 and was greeted in Piraeus harbour by eager officers. In January, a Crown Council gathered together the main leaders of the political movements under the aegis of the King and of Venizelos. The latter played the role of mediator between the forces present: the King, the government, the parliament, the troops, and the people. The solutions proposed by the Cretan prime minister were adopted: the convocation of an assembly tasked with constitutional revision and the resignation of the Mavromichalis government, to be replaced with a transitional government that would organise legislative elections. The leadership of the transitional government was given to Stephanos Dragoumis, who was considered an "independent". Nikolaos Zorbas was made minister of land forces. In exchange, Venizelos managed to convince the Military League to dissolve itself so as not to hinder the political process. In March 1910, an initially reluctant sovereign called new elections; three days later, the league announced its dissolution. Venizelos went back to Crete.

Using his Cretan citizenship as a pretext (the island had declared union with Greece but Greece had yet to recognise this), Venizelos did not participate in the elections, held in August 1910. His allies nominated him for a seat in Atticoboeotia but he stayed away from the electoral campaign. He was on a diplomatic tour of Western Europe when he learned that he had been elected and that deputies allied to him had obtained a relative majority with 146 of 362 seats. He thus returned to Athens amid rapturous public acclaim; the Dragoumis government resigned and Venizelos became prime minister in October 1910. He surrounded himself with collaborators bent on reform policies and began to apply the programme of the Goudi revolutionaries, strongly backed by public opinion. The Austrian ambassador observed on 28 October 1910: "Venizelos is a sort of popular tribune and almost the dictator of Greece. The enthusiasm of the people, who acclaim him everywhere, is striking". He decided to call immediate new elections in order to strengthen his majority: the assembly elected in August continued to be dominated by the old politicians. These took place on 11 December [O.S. 28 November] 1910. Venizelos was careful to present himself as an adversary of the "old" parties (which boycotted the elections), but also as free from influence by the Military League that had sought him out after the Goudi coup. Thus he did not hesitate to take as an aide-de-camp Ioannis Metaxas, a bête noire of the league whom it had removed. Venizelos' Liberal Party won the elections with an overwhelming majority of 300 out of 362 deputies.

== Reformist policies ==
The reforms of the Venizelos government were numerous, and allowed Greece to modernise and thus be better prepared for the Balkan Wars and World War I. The King supported them, seeing in his prime minister the best hope of stemming the anti-monarchism that had surfaced in 1897 and gained renewed momentum in the 1908–1909 crisis.

To the people who wanted the assembly elected in 1910 to be a constituent assembly, Venizelos replied that he considered it more of a "revisionary assembly". The 50 constitutional amendments of 1911, prepared by a commission directed by Stephanos Dragoumis, led to the frequently expressed opinion that after this date, Greece had an entirely new fundamental law, the Greek Constitution of 1911. This revision reformed the status of property by allowing for expropriation in the national interest, opening up the possibility of land reform; 300,000 arpents (100,000 ha) were distributed to 4,000 farm families in Thessaly. Agricultural education was encouraged, and farming cooperatives, a ministry of agriculture was created and an agronomist named in each region. Bureaucrats were given greater security of tenure, and hiring for civil service posts began to be done by public examination. Judges were protected by a superior magistracy council. Social legislation ameliorated the condition of the working class: child labour was abolished, as was nighttime labour by women, and a minimum wage introduced for both; Sunday was made an obligatory day of rest; primary education was made free and compulsory; and a social insurance system was created. The right of labour unions to function was recognised. Stabilisation of the drachma once again allowed for foreign borrowing. The state budget showed a surplus in 1911 and 1912 after many years of deficit, and tax evasion was curbed. The tax on sugar was cut by 50%, and a progressive income tax was introduced. Taken together, the reforms helped neutralise the development of strong socialist and agrarian movements seen elsewhere in the Balkans in that period. The army and navy were reorganised with help from France, which sent a military mission led by General Eydoux (Germany had reformed the Turkish Army). The navy was reorganised by a British mission that Admiral Tufnell headed. However, Venizelos, anxious to show that he was no military puppet, excluded soldiers from political life, released officers arrested for attempting to thwart the Goudi coup, and restored to Crown Prince Constantine (given the new post of inspector-general of the army), along with his brothers, their army posts. This angered the members of the defunct Military League, who for a time thought of recreating it, indeed of carrying out another coup.

== Additional reading ==
- Mazower, Mark (December 1992). "The Messiah and the Bourgeoisie: Venizelos and Politics in Greece, 1909–1912" (PDF). The Historical Journal. 35 (4): 885–904. doi:10.1017/S0018246X00026200. JSTOR 2639443. S2CID 154495315.
- Papacosma, S. Victor (1977). The Military in Greek Politics: The 1909 Coup D'état. Kent State University Press. ISBN 0-87338-208-0.
