= Vogatsiko =

Village in Western Macedonia, Greece

Vogatsiko Βογατσικό
- Community
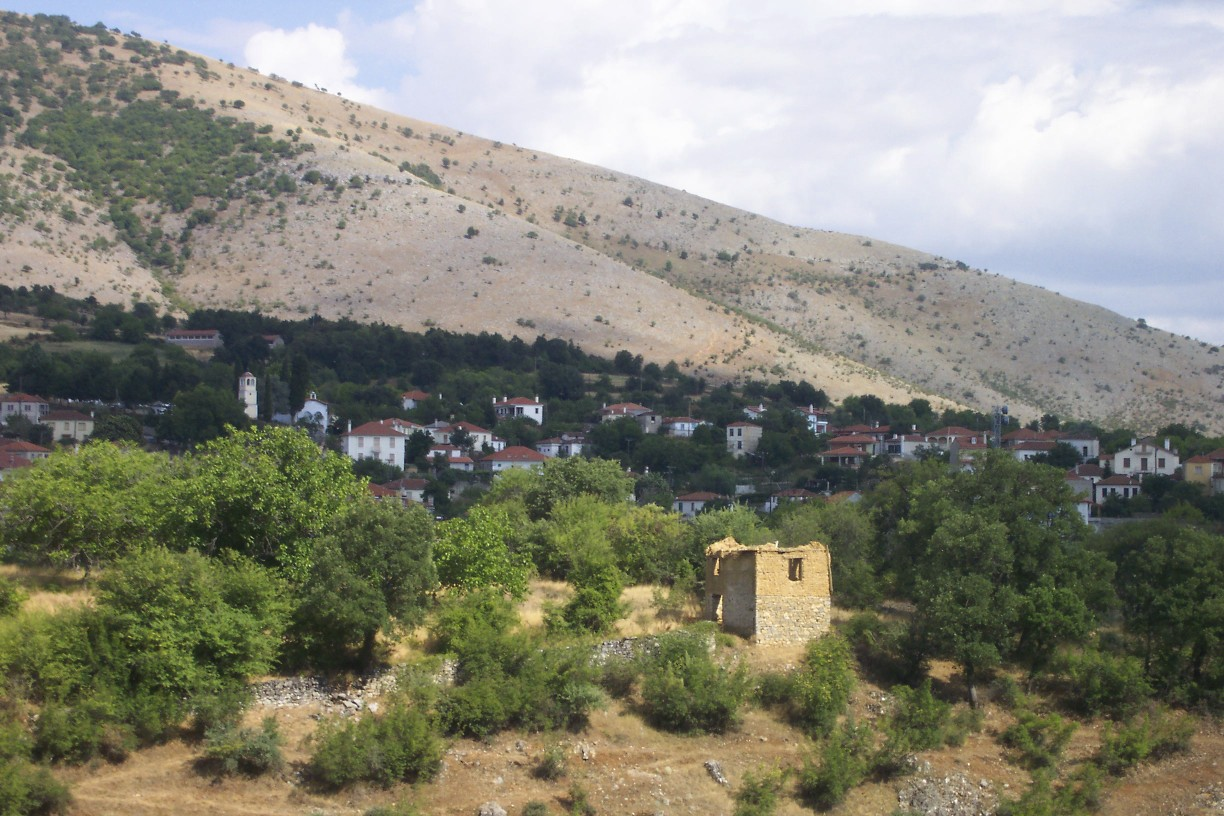
- Vogatsiko, partial view

- Location within Greece
- Coordinates: 40°24′48″N 21°22′53″E
- Country: Greece
- Geographic region: Macedonia
- Administrative region: Western Macedonia
- Regional unit: Kastoria
- Municipality: Argos Orestiko
- Municipal unit: Ion Dragoumis
- Elevation: 800 m (2,600 ft)

Population (2021)
  - Community: 438
- Time zone: UTC+2 (EET)
  - Summer (DST): UTC+3 (EEST)
- Postal code: 52053
- Area code: 24670-95
- Vehicle registration: KT

Vogatsiko (Greek: Βογατσικό) is a village and a community in northern Greece in the geographic region of Macedonia, located at the southeast corner of the Kastoria regional unit. Between 1997 and 2010, it was the seat of the municipality of Ion Dragoumis. The population was 438 at the 2021 census. It is surrounded by mountains on three sides and overlooks a valley through which the Aliakmon river passes.

According to the statistics of Vasil Kanchov ("Macedonia, Ethnography and Statistics"), 1.750 Greek Christians lived in the village in 1900.

The village has a rich history, including being the origin of the Dragoumis family and its most notable member, Ion Dragoumis.
