= Nostimo, Kastoria =

Village in Western Macedonia, Greece

Nostimo
- Community
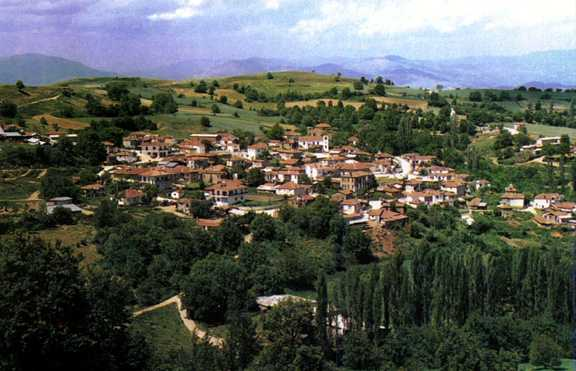

- Location within Greece
- Coordinates: 40°23′17″N 21°12′15″E
- Country: Greece
- Geographic region: Macedonia
- Administrative region: Western Macedonia
- Regional unit: Kastoria
- Municipality: Argos Orestiko
- Municipal unit: Argos Orestiko

Population (2021)
  - Community: 73
- Time zone: UTC+2 (EET)
  - Summer (DST): UTC+3 (EEST)

Nostimo (Greek: Νόστιμο, before 1927: Νιστήμιον – Nistimion, between 1927 and 1928: Κουφοξυλιά – Koufoxylia) is a village and a community in Kastoria Regional Unit, Macedonia, Greece. The Paleontological and Paleobotanical Museum is located in Nostimo.

The 1920 Greek census recorded 498 people in the village, and 170 inhabitants (30 families) were Muslim in 1923. Following the Greek–Turkish population exchange, Greek refugee families in Nistimion were from Pontus (9) in 1926. The 1928 Greek census recorded 410 village inhabitants. In 1928, the refugee families numbered 9 (32 people).
