= Nikolaos Dragoumis =

Greek painter (1874–1933)

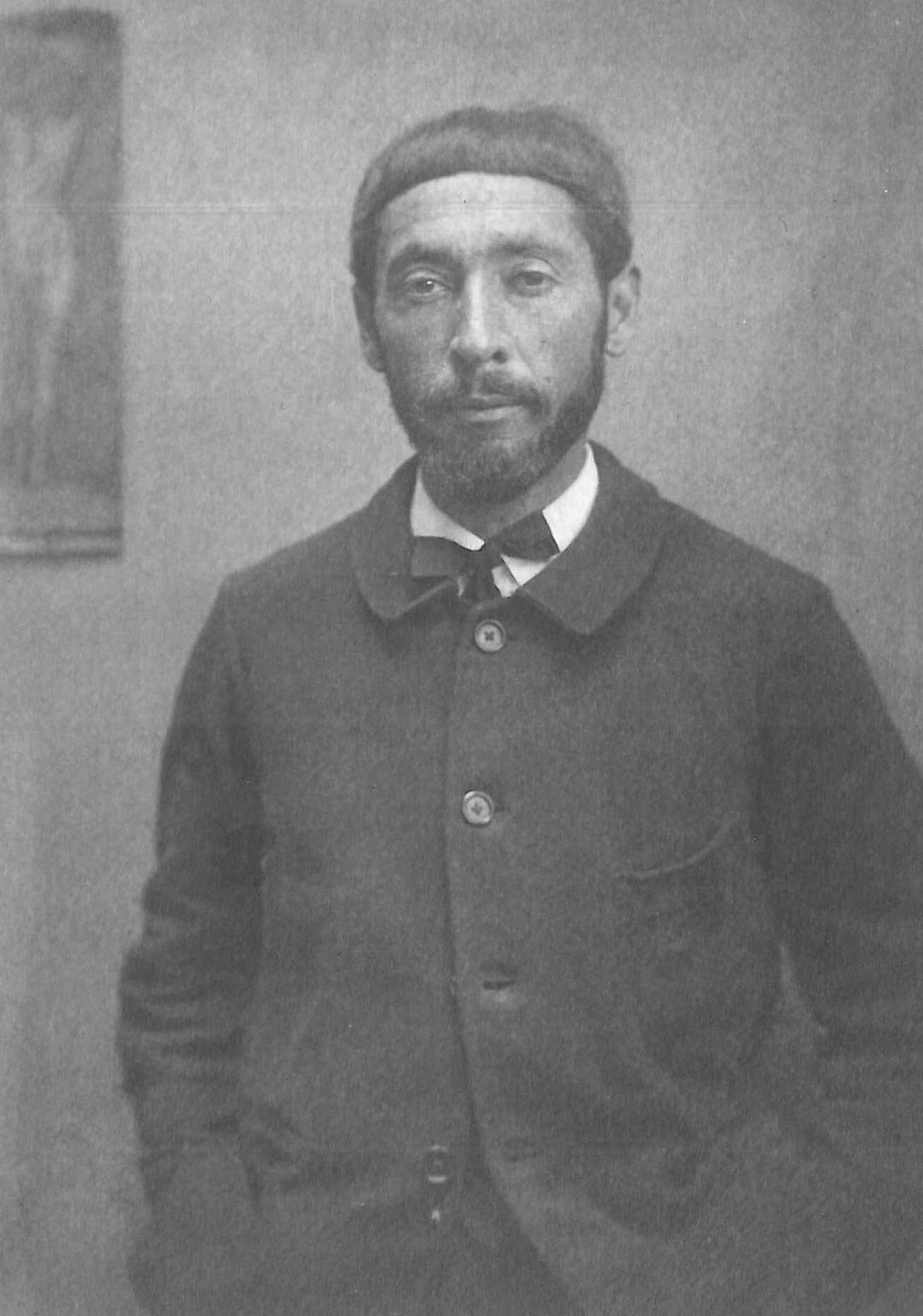
- Born: 29 August 1874; Athens, Greece
- Died: 6 January 1933 (aged 58); Athens, Greece
- Resting place: First Cemetery of Athens
- Movement: Post Impressionism

Nikolaos (Nikos) Dragoumis (29 August 1874 – 6 January 1933) was a Greek painter and the firstborn son of Stephanos Dragoumis and Elizabeth Kontogiannakis. He has been described by Dimitris Pikionis as "the van Gogh of Greece" because he was an exceptional post-Impressionist, and one of the forerunners of post-Impressionism in Greece.

== Life ==
He was born on 29 August 1874 in Athens, where he spent his childhood. In September 1891 he went to Paris for the first time to study at Lycee Janson-de-Sailly, preparing for the French Naval School and pursuing a military career. His guardian during that time was the Greek writer Dimitrios Vikelas. However, in June 1893 he failed the Naval School exams and in October of the same year he enrolled at the Sorbonne Law School. In the summer of 1896 he was in Munich to study law at the University of Ludwig-Maximilans, while at the same time he became friend with the Greek painter Dimitrios Geraniotis, who studied at the Munich Academy. In November 1897, Nikos Dragoumis obtained his degree from the University of Sorbonne and returned to Greece to pursue a career in the Foreign Ministry. However, he broke up with his family and his father, Stephanos, sent him to Volos to work as an assistant manager of the Thessaly Railway Company. But Nikos Dragoumis secretly left Volos in May 1899 and returned to Paris this time to study painting.

Nikos Dragoumis, Marika Dragoumis, Sister of the Painter, 1909, ink and gouache on paper, private collection

He was enrolled in the Julian Free Academy in October 1900 and studied there until December 1902 in the workshop of William Bouguereau (1825-1905). At the same time, in the years 1900, 1901, 1902 he was enrolled in the entrance examinations of the Ecole des Beaux-Arts but seems to have failed in all three of his attempts. During these years he befriended Dimitris Galanis, who portrayed Dragoumis in one of his first works in Paris, the painting by Trovadouros (1900, today at the National Gallery and the Museum of Alexandros Soutsos). In June 1903 Dragoumis went to the village of Graveson for the first time in Provence, where he spent a long period of his life painting. In August 1904 he visited Greece and his family in Kifissia. It is noteworthy that Nikos was the last member of the Dragoumis family to see Pavlos Melas alive: he stayed with him on the night of August 29 and accompanied him the next morning to the train station, from where Melas left for his last trip to Macedonia. Dragoumis returned to Paris in June 1905, although he remained in Graveson. In 1908 he began his relationship with the Russian painter Lydia Borzek. He was again found in Greece from October 1909 until July 1910 before returning to Paris. In October 1911, while in Graveson, his mental illness developed. On 2 November he left Marseille for Piraeus. Accompanied by his brother Ion, a few days later, he entered a private clinic for the mentally ill in Naples, Italy. Dragoumis did not stay in Naples for a long time. Shortly afterwards the family moved him to Corfu and in the summer of 1913 he and Borzek visited Andros. In August 1913 he settled in Kifissia, but in May of the following year, accompanied by Ion Dragoumis, he traveled to the village of Sent, near Geneva, and entered a private psychiatric clinic. He stayed there for 18 years until 1932, when his family brought him back to Greece due to financial difficulties. He entered the Dromokaitio Institute in Chaidari in August, where he died a few months later, on 6 January 1933, possibly from a stroke.

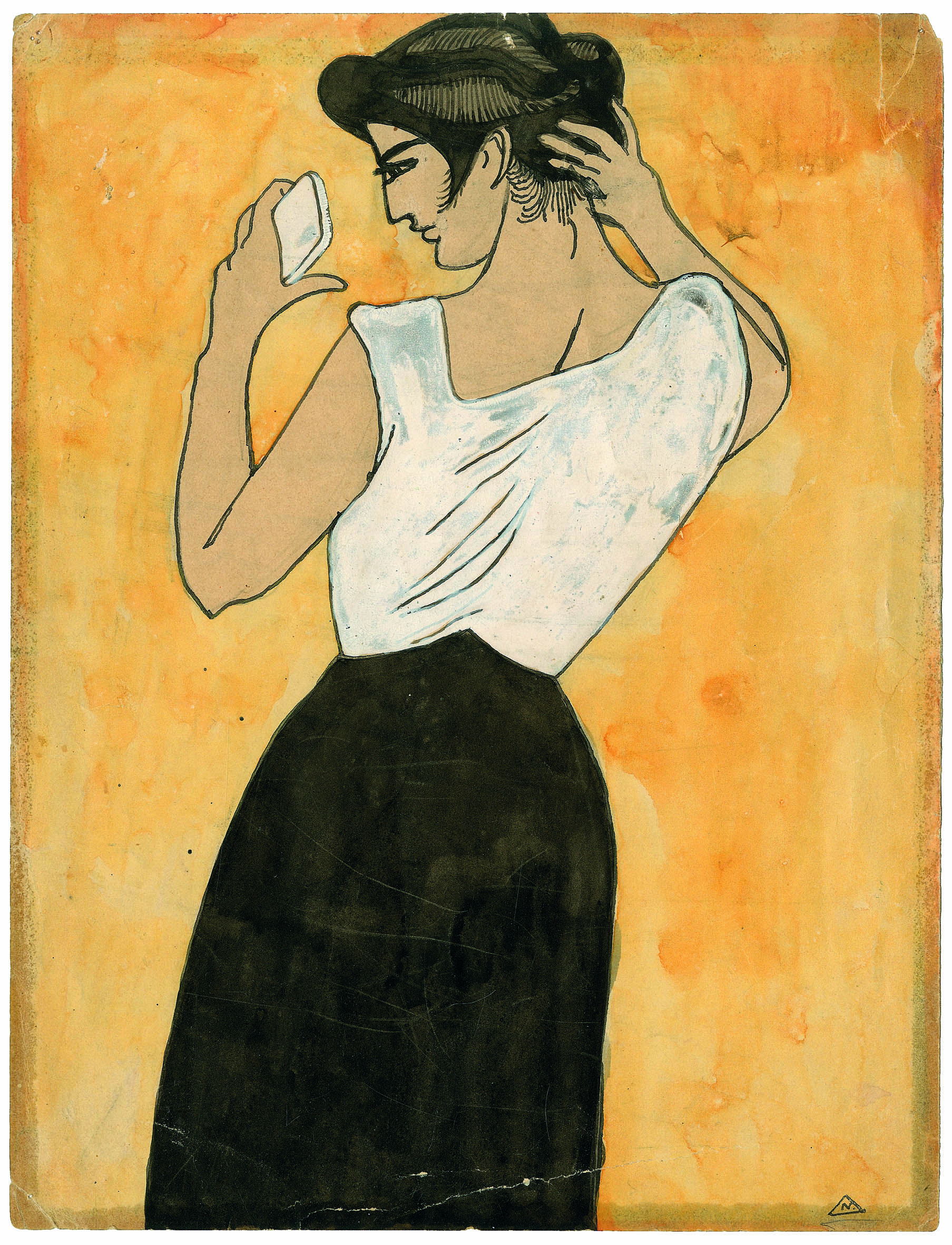
"Marika Dragoumi", the artist's sister, 1909, Indian ink and gouache on paper, private collection

== Works ==
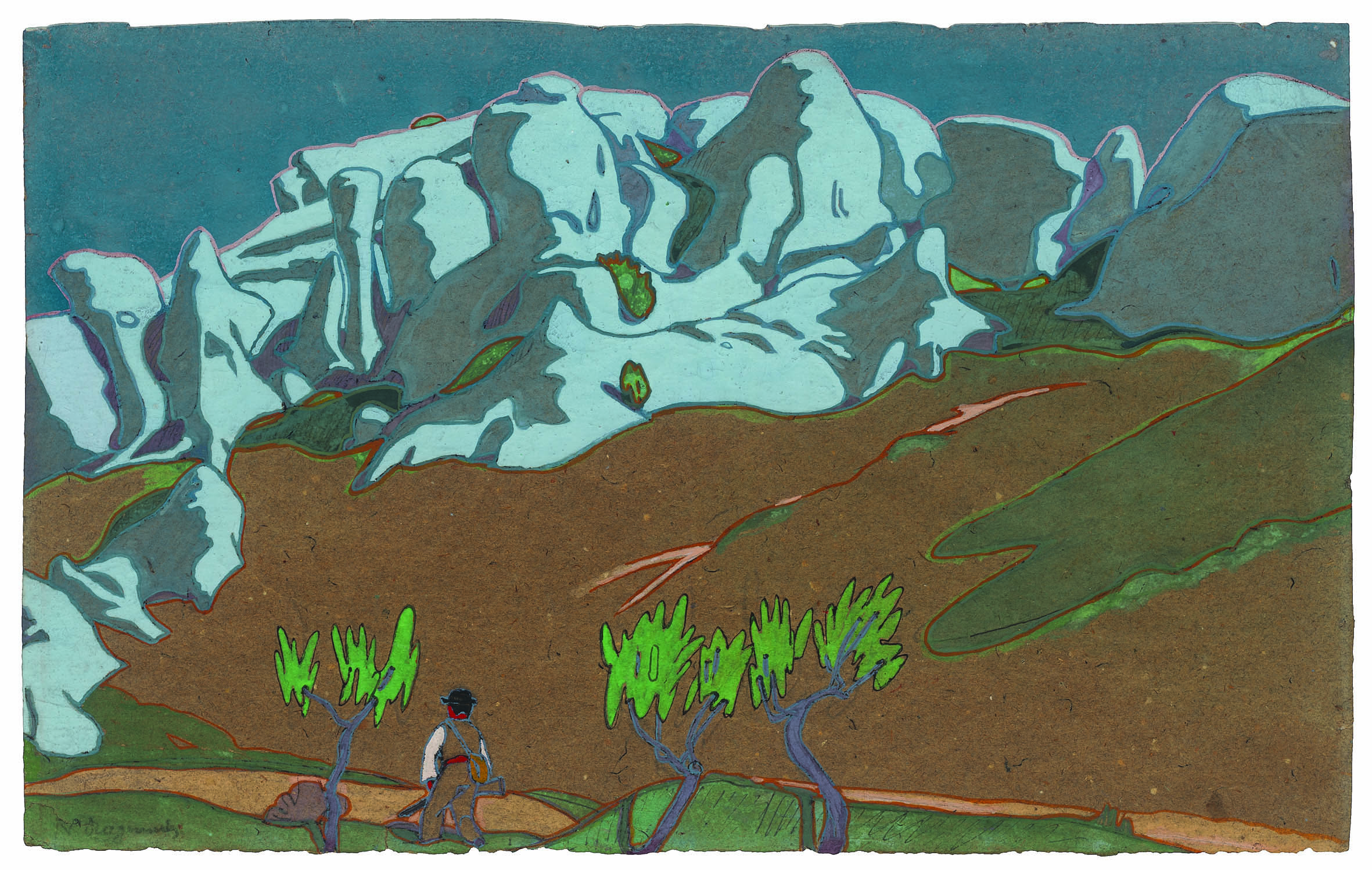
"Chaîne des Alpilles, Saint-Rémy-de-Provence", gouache on paper, private collection

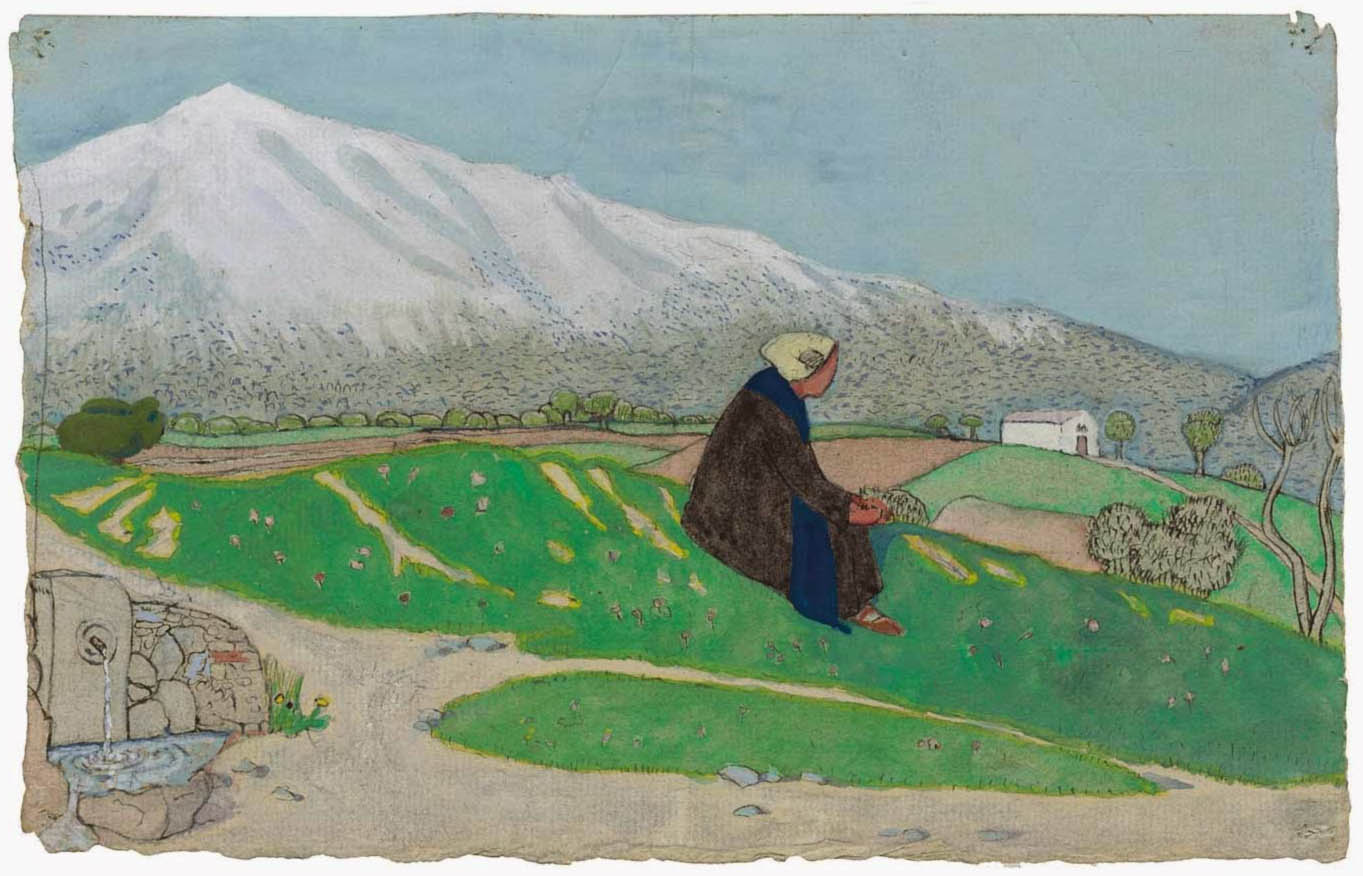
"Lydia in Kokkinaras", 1913, pencil and gouache on paper, private collection

The first time that Nikos Dragoumi's works were presented to the public was after his death, in 1936, at the 6th Exhibition of the Avignon Group of Independent Painters (March 20–30, at the Town Hall), under the responsibility of the painter and his friend Jean Baltus. In Greece, the first reference to the painter Dragoumi was made by Dimitris Pikionis in 1963 in an article in the Zigos magazine: "I had met him in the spring of 1911 in Paris, in the Luxembourg gardens. Breton costume, cap and wooden footwear. […] He gave me a sketch of his sister combing her hair. The next day he would start early in the morning to go to Provence, hiking under the fiery rays of Apollo, to show the vintage, this Greek Van Gogh!" Essentially, the Greek public first came into contact with Dragoumis' paintings through an exhibition organized by the National Bank Education Foundation in 2015 (May 7-July 18).

In an unpublished text, his brother, Philippos Dragoumis, remarked: "Nikos never wanted to sell any of the paintings because he believed that true art was sacred and non-marketable. [...] He was a follower of the principle of L'art pour l'art (= Art for art), that art is simply an expression of the artist's mental aesthetic world and nothing more. "

Since Dragoumis himself burned several of his paintings in 1911, with the onset of his mental illness, today the family archive preserves basically lightweight designs (pencil, charcoal, watercolors) on paper. These reveal his intentions and aspirations, his stylistic influences and the spirit in which his artistic creation was shaped. Dragoumis, who did not systematically study painting, was nurtured as a painter in Paris at the beginning of the 20th century, at a time when Impressionism and post-Impressionist movements dominated French art, while in the Salons of the avant-garde the cubists were presented for the first time. Dragoumis was rather indifferent to Modernism and the experiments of Matisse, Braque and Picasso, focusing his attention essentially on the Nabian circle and more broadly on Symbolism. He was also greatly influenced by Van Gogh's painting, both thematically and stylistically, and secondarily by Gauguin and the Pont Aven School (Provence). He was interested in depicting the (French and, to a lesser extent, Greek) countryside [cf. the project: Chaîne des Alpilles, Saint-Rémy-de-Provence], the relationship between the human form and the landscape (especially the woman in the landscape), but also the lives of the people of labor (farmers, workers). In his work, of course, one does not identify the social concerns that characterized Courbet, but rather the symbolic extensions that distinguish Gauguin, Van Gogh and Les Nabis. Similar observations can also be made at the level of style: Dragoumis is not part of Impressionism but rather of post-Impressionist quests. His works are not shaken by the strong light, but are characterized by hard outlines, love of the line, tough forms [cf. the work: Marika Dragoumi, sister of the painter]. Finally, some exposures to expressionism should also be understood as loans by Van Gogh. On the other hand, Dragoumis stayed away from the problems faced by Greek visual artists in the early 20th century. It is noteworthy that even the few works he created in Greece exude a clear French aura [cf. the work: Lydia in Kokkinaras] with the possible exception of his plans from Andros (summer 1913).
