= Lakkomata, Kastoria =

Lakkomata
- Community
- Location within Greece
- Coordinates: 40°25′46″N 21°12′4″E
- Country: Greece
- Geographic region: Macedonia
- Administrative region: Western Macedonia
- Regional unit: Kastoria
- Municipality: Argos Orestiko
- Municipal unit: Argos Orestiko

Population (2021)
  - Community: 169
- Time zone: UTC+2 (EET)
  - Summer (DST): UTC+3 (EEST)

Lakkomata (Greek: Λακκώματα, before 1927: Σταρίτσανη – Staritsani) is a village and a community in Kastoria Regional Unit, Macedonia, Greece. The community consists of the villages Lakkomata, Krya Nera and Lachanokipoi.

In 1945, Greek Foreign Minister Ioannis Politis ordered the compilation of demographic data regarding the Prefecture of Kastoria. The village Lakkomata had a total of 300 inhabitants, and was populated by 250 Slavophones without a Bulgarian national consciousness.
