= Ion Dragoumis =

Greek diplomat and philosopher (1878–1920)

- Ίων Δραγούμης
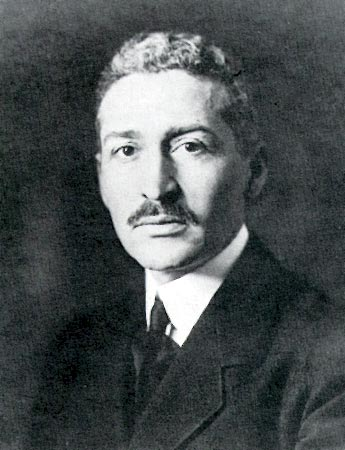
- Ion Dragoumis, early 20th century.
- Born: 14 September 1878; Athens, Kingdom of Greece
- Died: 31 July 1920 (aged 41); Athens, Kingdom of Greece
- Cause of death: Assassination
- Occupations: Soldier; Diplomat; Philosopher; Writer; Revolutionary
- Partner(s): Penelope Delta; Marika Kotopouli
- Relatives: Nikolaos Dragoumis (grandfather); Markos Dragoumis (great-grandfather)
- Family: Stephanos Dragoumis (father); Elisavet Kontogiannaki (mother); Philippos Dragoumis (brother); Natalia Dragoumi (sister); Nikolaos Dragoumis (brother); Alexandros Dragoumis (brother); Alexandra Dragoumi (sister); Marika Dragoumi (sister)

Education
- Education: University of Athens

Philosophical work
- Era: 20th-century philosophy
- Region: Western philosophy
- School: Continental philosophy Romanticism
- Main interests: History, politics, religion
- Notable ideas: Greek nationalism Romantic nationalism Eastern Party; Greek tradition Demoticism; Communitarianism; Panhellenism; Pacifism under a Pax Hellenica in the Middle East; Role of the Greek Orthodox tradition (despite his agnostic thought)
- Military career
- Allegiance: Kingdom of Greece
- Branch: Hellenic Army; HMC
- Conflicts: Greco-Turkish War (1897); Macedonian Struggle

Ion Dragoumis (Greek: Ίων Δραγούμης; 14 September 1878 – 31 July 1920) was a Greek diplomat, writer, and political thinker who played an important role in shaping Greek political thought and ideas of national identity in the early 20th century. He is best known for his prominent role in the Macedonian Struggle, as well as for his advocacy of Demotic during the Greek language question.

== Biography ==
Born in Athens, Dragoumis was the son of Stephanos Dragoumis who was foreign minister under Charilaos Trikoupis. The Dragoumis family was a prominent Greek family, which originated from Vogatsiko in Kastoria regional unit. Ion's great-grandfather, Markos Dragoumis (1770–1854), was a member of the Filiki Eteria revolutionary organisation.

Ion Dragoumis studied law at Athens University and, in 1899, entered the diplomatic branch of the Greek Foreign Ministry. In 1897, he enlisted in the Hellenic Army and fought in the Greco-Turkish War of 1897.

In 1902, Dragoumis was made deputy consul in the Greek consulate at Monastir (present-day Bitola). In 1903, he became head of the consulate at Serres and later went on to serve in Plovdiv, Burgas, Alexandria and Alexandroupolis. In 1907, he was assigned to the embassy in Constantinople.

In 1905, during his time as the Vice-Consul of Greece in Alexandria, Dragoumis met and started a love affair with the writer Penelope Delta, who was married to the businessman Stephanos Delta. Out of respect for her husband and children, Dragoumis and Delta eventually decided to separate, but continued to correspond passionately until 1912, when Dragoumis started a relationship with the famous stage actress Marika Kotopouli.

Dragoumis became instrumental in the Macedonian Struggle. In Macedonia, a new Filiki Eteria was founded, under the leadership of Anastasios Pichion from Ohrid, whilst in Athens, the Macedonian Committee was formed in 1904 by Dragoumis' father, Stephanos Dragoumis.

In 1907, he published the book Martyron kai Iroon Aima (Martyrs’ and Heroes’ Blood), which presented his views on the situation in Macedonia and on what the Greek government should do to more properly defend the Greek element there. During this period, he also toyed with the idea of a Greek-Ottoman Empire, believing that Greeks, already having control of commerce and finance, would also gain political power in such an arrangement.

In 1909, the Goudi Revolt broke out and his father, Stephanos Dragoumis became Prime Minister of Greece. However, the Military League decided later to invite Eleftherios Venizelos to become prime minister.

In 1910, he founded, collaborating with philologists and writers (Vlasis Gavriilidis, Nikos Kazantzakis, Alexandros Delmouzos, Alexandros Papanastasiou, Manolis Triantafyllidis, Lorentzos Mavilis), the Educational Club (Εκπαιδευτικός Όμιλος), an organization for the promotion of Demotic Greek language, while he was writing also articles in the philological magazine "Noumas" (with the nickname Idas).

When the First Balkan War broke out, Dragoumis travelled to Thessaloniki as an attaché to Crown Prince (later King) Constantine.

In 1914, he is accredited Ambassador of Greece to Russia.

In 1915, he resigned from the diplomatic corps; having entered Greek politics as an independent, he was elected to the Greek Parliament for constituency of Florina.

With the outbreak of the First World War, he was in favour of Greece joining the Entente, but gradually and during the National Schism he disagreed with Venizelos' policy and became hostile towards Venizelists. In 1917, he was exiled to Corsica by the French and Venizelists, from where he returned in 1919.

On 30 July 1920, an attempt was made by two royalists to assassinate Venizelos at the Gare de Lyon railway station in Paris. The next day, 31 July, Dragoumis was stopped by a Venizelist Democratic Security Battalion (Δημοκρατικά Τάγματα Ασφαλείας) in Athens and was executed as a form of payback.

Though her relationship with him ended many years before, Penelope Delta (herself a supporter of Venizelos) deeply mourned Dragoumis, and after he was killed wore nothing but black until her own death two decades later. In the late 1930s she received Dragoumis' diaries and archives, entrusted to her by his brother Philippos. She managed to dictate 1,000 pages of manuscripted comments on Dragoumis' work, before deciding to take her own life in 1941.

== Ideas and legacy ==
Dragoumis's thought was a mix of communitarianism and Romantic nationalism. He considered that the nation is superior than the state, which must serve the nation. He was a supporter of Greek irredentism, to include as many Greek lands and population as possible in the Greek state, but did not embrace the Megali Idea, with the capture of Constantinople, which he regarded as an anachronistic concept.

He believed that Hellenism was a power of civilization in the East and so would predominate. He supported preserving the Greek communities in Asia Minor and the Middle East.

Dragoumis is now honoured for his patriotism and significant contribution during the Macedonian Struggle. However, during the National Schism, he disagreed with the Venizelist policy and later did not believe in the success of the Asia Minor Campaign.

In 1986, the journalist Freddy Germanos (1934–1999) wrote the novel I Ektelesi (The Execution) about his murder. A stele with an epigram of Kostis Palamas stands on the site of his murder, while the Ion Dragoumis municipality was named after him.

== Works ==
- The Path (Το Μονοπάτι), 1902
- Martyrs and Heroes Blood, 1907
- Samothrace, 1908
- All Those Alive (Όσοι Ζωντανοί), 1911
- Hellenic civilization, 1914
- Stop (Σταμάτημα), 1918
- My Hellenism and the Hellenes, 1927

== Sources ==
- Dimitri Kitsikis, Synkritike Historia Hellados kai Tourkias ston 20o aoiona ("A Comparative History of Greece and Turkey in the 20th Century"), Athens, Hestia, 3rd ed., 1998. ISBN 960-05-0072-X
