= Ion Dragoumis (municipal unit) =

Ion Dragoumis Ίων Δραγούμης
- Municipal unit
- Location within the regional unit

- Location within Greece
- Coordinates: 40°25′N 21°22′E
- Country: Greece
- Geographic region: Macedonia
- Administrative region: Western Macedonia
- Regional unit: Kastoria
- Municipality: Argos Orestiko

Area
  - Municipal unit: 134.3 km^{2} (51.9 sq mi)

Population (2021)
  - Municipal unit: 2,357
  - Municipal unit density: 17.55/km^{2} (45.45/sq mi)
- Time zone: UTC+2 (EET)
  - Summer (DST): UTC+3 (EEST)
- Vehicle registration: KT

Ion Dragoumis (Greek: Ίων Δραγούμης) is a municipal unit of Argos Orestiko municipality in the Kastoria regional unit, Western Macedonia, Greece. Until the 2011 local government reform it was a separate municipality. It was named after the Greek diplomat and protagonist of the Macedonian Struggle, Ion Dragoumis. The municipal unit has an area of 134.335 km^{2}, and a population of 2,899 (2011). The seat of the former municipality was in Vogatsiko.
