= Stefanos Dragoumis =

Greek judge, writer and the Prime Minister of Greece (January 1910 – October 1910)

- Στέφανος Δραγούμης
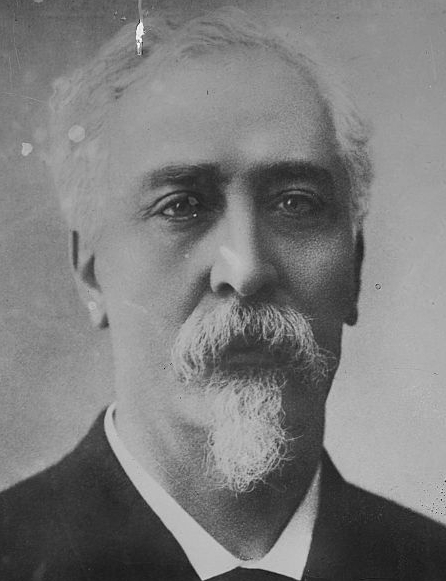

Prime Minister of Greece
- In office 18 January 1910 – 6 October 1910
- Monarch: George I
- Preceded by: Kyriakoulis Mavromichalis
- Succeeded by: Eleftherios Venizelos

Minister of Finance
- In office 24 September 1915 – 27 March 1916
- Prime Minister: Alexandros Zaimis; Stefanos Skouloudis
- Preceded by: Emmanouil Repoulis
- Succeeded by: Dimitrios Rallis

Personal details
- Born: 2 February 1842 Athens, Greece
- Died: 17 September 1923 (aged 81)
- Children: Ion Dragoumis; Natalia Dragoumis, spouse of Pavlos Melas
- Education: University of Paris

Stefanos Dragoumis (Greek: Στέφανος Δραγούμης; 2 February 1842 – 17 September 1923) was a judge, writer and the Prime Minister of Greece from January to October 1910. He was the father of Ion Dragoumis.

== Early years ==
Dragoumis was born in Athens. His grandfather, Markos Dragoumis (1770–1854), who was born in a prominent Greek family from Vogatsiko in the present Kastoria regional unit, had been a member of the 1814–1821 revolutionary Filiki Eteria, while his father Nikolaos Dragoumis was a secretary of Ioannis Kapodistrias. Born in Athens in 1842, Dragoumis studied law at the University of Paris and became a judge.

== Political career ==
He became Secretary-General of the Ministry of Justice and was very active politically. He was later elected a member of Parliament and served as Minister of Foreign Affairs, Minister of Justice and Minister of the Interior. He was also active in the Macedonian Struggle. The organization Macedonian Committee was formed in 1904 by Stephanos Dragoumis in Athens.

== 1909 reform government ==
Following the Goudi Revolt by the Military League in 1909, the political processes in Greece were in a state of turmoil. The issue of Cretan annexation and military reforms loomed large. After Kyriakoulis Mavromichalis resigned as Prime Minister in January 1910, Dragoumis was appointed as part of a reform government and the Military League dissolved. At the same time, Eleftherios Venizelos arrived in Athens from Crete. In March, the Greek Parliament decided to convoke a Revisionary Parliament to revise the Greek Constitution. The Dragoumis government responded positively to the demands of its dual mission: to secure a smooth path towards the process of reform and to complete its legislative programme. By September, Venizelos had arrived in Athens and by drawing large crowds to rallies had established his political strength. King George invited Venizelos to form a government and Dragoumis resigned.

== Later career ==
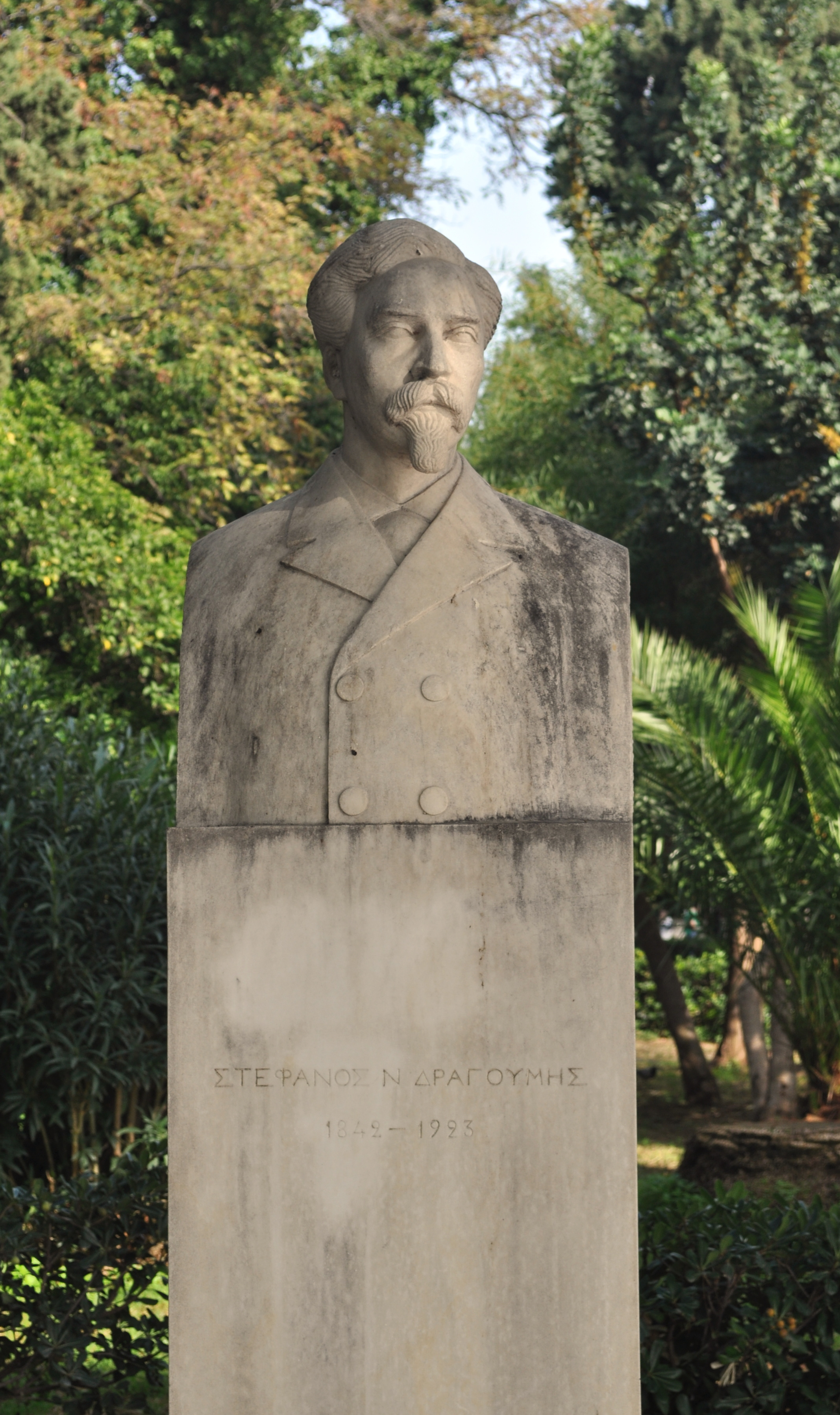
A bust in Athens

During the Balkan Wars, he served as Governor-General of Crete, and later (June 1913) of Macedonia. During the National Schism, he sided with the anti-Venizelist, royalist faction. He was elected to Parliament in the December 1915 elections, which the Venizelists boycotted, and served as Finance Minister in the Alexandros Zaimis and Stephanos Skouloudis cabinets. Dragoumis was dismissed from his seat in 1917, when Venizelos re-instated the May 1915 Parliament ("Lazarus Parliament"), but was re-elected as an MP in the November 1920 elections. He died in Athens.

Political offices
Preceded by Kyriakoulis Mavromichalis	Prime Minister of Greece; 1910	Succeeded by Eleftherios Venizelos
