= Argos Orestiko =

Town in Macedonia, Greece

Argos Orestiko Άργος Ορεστικό
- Municipality
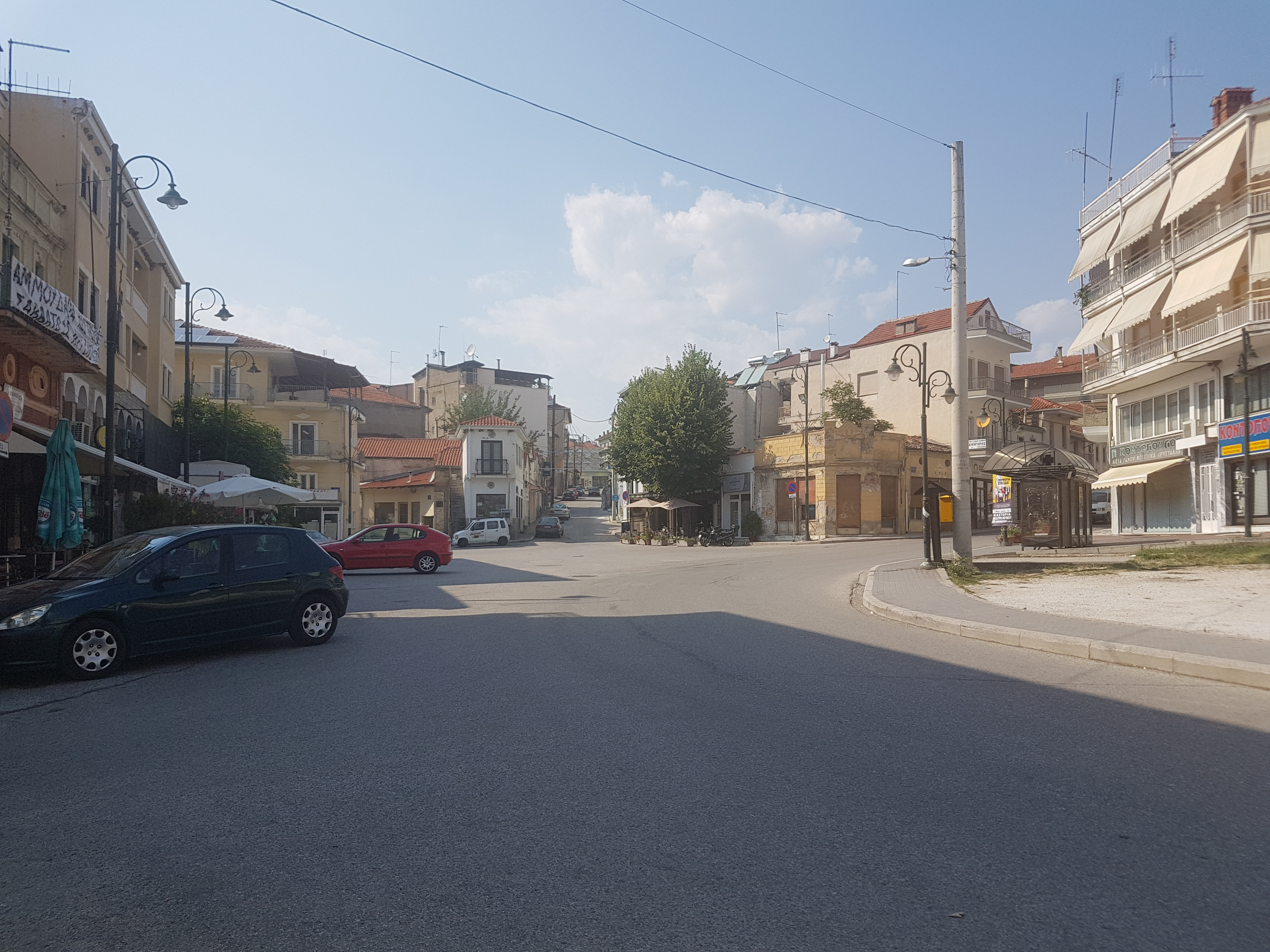
- Central square

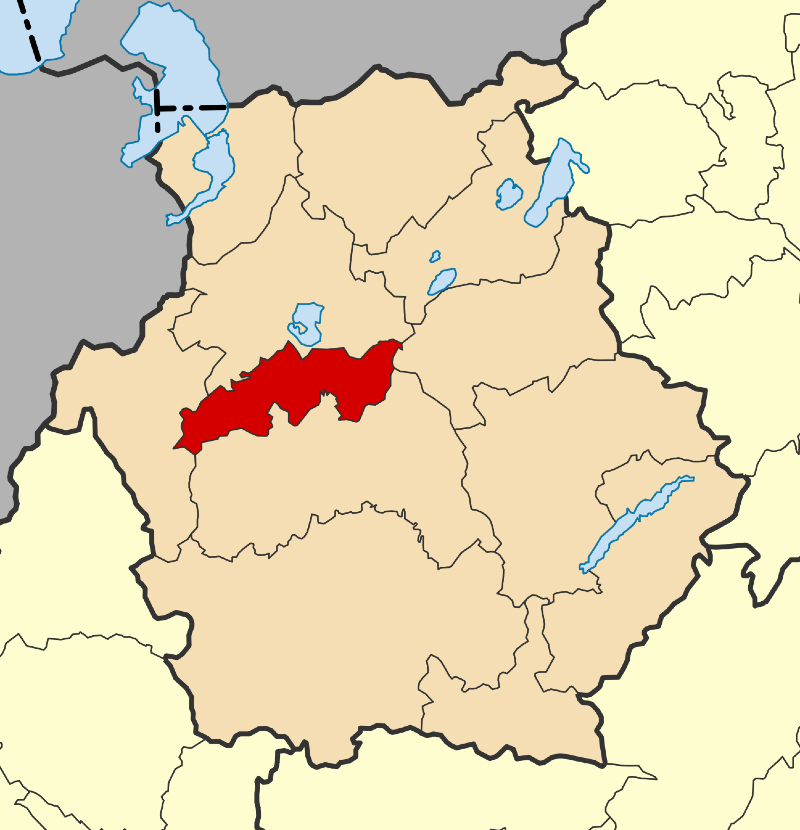
- Location within the region

- Location within Greece
- Coordinates: 40°27′N 21°15′E
- Country: Greece
- Geographic region: Macedonia
- Administrative region: Western Macedonia
- Regional unit: Kastoria

Area
  - Municipality: 340.7 km^{2} (131.5 sq mi)
  - Municipal unit: 206.4 km^{2} (79.7 sq mi)

Population (2021)
  - Municipality: 10,685
  - Density: 31.36/km^{2} (81.23/sq mi)
  - Municipal unit: 8,328
  - Municipal unit density: 40.35/km^{2} (104.5/sq mi)
  - Community: 7,240
- Time zone: UTC+2 (EET)
  - Summer (DST): UTC+3 (EEST)
- Vehicle registration: KT
- Website: www.argosorestiko.gr

Argos Orestiko (Greek: Άργος Ορεστικό, lit. 'Orestean Argos', before 1926: Χρούπιστα, Chroupista; Aromanian: Hrupishte) is a town and a municipality in the Kastoria regional unit of Macedonia, Greece. The Kastoria National Airport (also known as Aristotelis Airport) is located in Argos Orestiko.

== History ==
=== Antiquity ===
In antiquity, Argos Orestikon was the main town of the Orestae, in Upper Macedonia. It was said to have been founded by Orestes, the son of Agamemnon, who fled from Argos in the Peloponnese after the murder of his mother Clytemnestra.

The exact location of classical Argos Orestikon has not been found. Based on epigraphic evidence, the administrative centre of the Orestae lay near the centre of the present town Argos Orestiko, at a site named "Armenochori". During the campaign of Alexander the Great to the East, settlers from the town founded another Argos Orestikon to distant Scythian steppes during the 4th century BCE.

=== Modern period ===
At least since the 16th century, Argos Orestiko has a notable annual trade fair.

Towards the end of the 18th century, Aromanians from Moscopole settled in the town; later more followed from the villages of Gramosta and Samarina. According to a statistical report by British Colonel Henry Synge, dated 12 June 1878, the kaza of Chroupista (Argos Orestiko) had 4,565 Greek and 4,220 Aromanian males who were Orthodox Christians and recognized the Ecumenical Patriarchate of Constantinople (opposing the Bulgarian Exarchate); it also had 2,290 Muslim males. At the turn of the 20th century, the town of Argos Orestiko was inhabited by Greeks, Aromanians, Bulgarians, and Turks. In the late Ottoman period, the town was wealthy, had four mosques and many of its Muslim population were involved in agriculture and trade. During the end of the 19th century, it had a number of Greek schools, but also a Bulgarian and Romanian one; at that time, the Greek language prevailed in the town, even among Aromanians and Bulgarians, and particularly the former had a Greek national consciousness.

The 1920 Greek census recorded 3,603 people in the town, and in 1923, before the Greek–Turkish population exchange, 1,500 of its inhabitants (200 families) were Muslim. Following the population exchange, the Muslims were transferred to Turkey and 212 families of Greek refugees had settled in their place by 1926, out of which 133 were Pontic Greek, including 1 Caucasus Pontic Greek, 69 were from Western Asia Minor and 10 were from East Thrace. In the 1928 Greek census, the number of refugee families was recorded at 214, making up 852 people out of the town's 3,605 inhabitants. After the population exchange, the main mosque of the town was replaced with a church built and dedicated to Saint Paraskevi; the other three mosques were destroyed.

In 1945, Greek Foreign Minister Ioannis Politis ordered the compilation of demographic data regarding the Prefecture of Kastoria. The town Argos Orestiko had a total of 4,100 inhabitants, including 1,370 Slavophones.

== Municipality ==
The Municipality of Argos Orestiko (former Orestida) was formed at the 2011 local government reform by the merger of the former municipalities Argos Orestiko and Ion Dragoumis, that became municipal units. Orestida was renamed to Argos Orestiko in 2013. The municipality of Argos Orestiko has an area of 340.731 km^{2} (131.557 sq mi); the municipal unit of Argos Orestiko (the pre-2011 municipality) has an area of 206.396 km^{2} (79.690 sq mi).

The municipal units are further subdivided into the following communities:

- Argos Orestiko: Agios Ilias, Ammoudara, Argos Orestiko, Asprokklisia, Dialekto, Kastanofyto, Lagka, Lakkomata, Melanthio, Nostimo, Spilaia, Spilios and Vrachos
- Ion Dragoumis: Ampelokipoi, Germas, Kostarazi, Militsa and Vogatsiko

== Notable people ==
- Evangelos Spanos, revolutionary of the Greek War of Independence
- Maria Spanou, revolutionary of the Greek War of Independence
- Naoum Spanos (1872–1955), Makedonomachos during the Macedonian Struggle
- Toma Caragiu (1925–1977)
- Matilda Caragiu Marioțeanu (1927–2009)
- Demetri Dollis (born 1956)
- Mincho Fotev (1922–1987)
- Patrona Halil (1690–1730)
- Tom and John Kiradjieff (1892–1960, 1895–1953)
- Filip Mișea (1873–1944)

== See also ==
- Fossil Exhibition (Nostimo), a village 14 km away from Argos Orestiko
- Aiani
- Aigai
