= Kratero =

Kratero Κρατερό
- Community
- Location within Greece
- Coordinates: 40°51′N 21°19′E
- Country: Greece
- Administrative region: West Macedonia
- Regional unit: Florina
- Municipality: Florina
- Municipal unit: Kato Kleines
- Elevation: 980 m (3,220 ft)

Population (2021)
  - Community: 53
- Time zone: UTC+2 (EET)
  - Summer (DST): UTC+3 (EEST)
- Postal code: 531 00
- Area code: 2385
- Vehicle registration: ΡΑ

Kratero (Greek: Κρατερό, before 1926: Ράκοβο – Rakovo; Macedonian and Bulgarian: Раково, Rakovo) is a village located in the Florina regional unit of northwestern Macedonia, Greece.

== Geography ==
Kratero is located east of the Lake Prespa National Park and is on the slopes of the Eastern Varnous mountain range. The village is at an altitude of 980 metres (3,220 ft). Neighbouring villages include Ethniko, Kato Kleines, Ano Kleines, and Akritas. Kratero is about 20 km (12 mi) north of the town of Florina. It is close to the Greek border with Albania, and within one kilometer of the border with North Macedonia. It is located within the Eastern European Time Zone (GMT+3).

== Origins of the village ==
The village was originally named Rakovo in Slavic. This word comes from Rakoits and means fresh water crayfish, which were plentiful in the nearby streams. The village was named Krateron in 1928 after the Second Balkan War of 1913 when the region became part of Greece according to the Treaty of Bucharest (1913). Many residents migrated from Kratero in the 1950s to start new lives in the United States, Canada and Australia.

== Kratero at the time of the Ilinden Uprising (1903) ==
The village has experienced a turbulent history as a result of its location and the strong patriarchist and Greek national identity of the population. However, according to Borivoje Milojević, a Serbian anthropologist and ethnographer, in 1917–1918, there were 100 houses in the village, all with predominantly a Slavic identity. The village was burnt down three times, once in 1903 by the Ottoman Turkish Army, in 1907 by Bulgarian bands, and in 1947 during the Greek Civil War.

The village of Kratero was heavily affected by the events of the Ilinden Uprising of 1903 due to the village's remote location in the Monastir Vilayet of the Ottoman Empire.The Greek priest, Papa Dimitrios and two notables, K. Traianou and Y. Konstantinou were murdered, and five more members of the community were beaten. Later, a Bulgarian armed band again raided Kratero murdering the Greek Priest Mitanidis, the village President Stavros Maligeorgos, and Vice President Yiorgos Boikovitis. In August 1903, Ottoman troops attacked the village in their attempts to deal with the Ilinden insurrection, burning and destroying 100 out of 120 houses.

== Notable people ==
- Pavlos Rakovitis
