= Nikolaos Kollias =

Greek Macedonian fighter

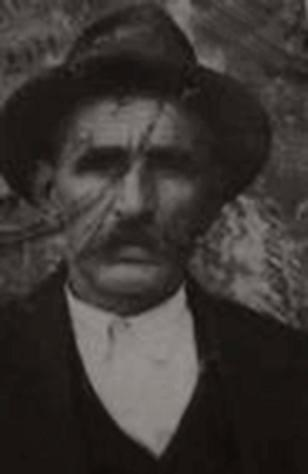
- Photo of Nikolaos Kollias.
- Native name: Νικόλαος Κόλλιας
- Born: c. 1860s Selitsa, Monastir Vilayet, Ottoman Empire (now Eratyra, Greece)
- Allegiance: Kingdom of Greece
- Service / branch: Hellenic Army
- Battles / wars: Macedonian Revolt (1896-1897); Greco-Turkish War (1897); Macedonian Struggle; Balkan Wars; First Balkan War; Second Balkan War

Nikolaos Kollias (Greek: Νικόλαος Κόλλιας; born in Selitsa, Voio) was a Greek revolutionary and soldier.

Nikolaos Kollias took part in the 1896-1897 Greek Macedonian rebellion and enlisted in the Hellenic Army to serve in the Greco-Turkish War of 1897. He took an active part in the Macedonian Struggle and would once again volunteer for army service during the Balkan Wars.
