= Varzi (disambiguation) =

Varzi is a comune in the Province of Pavia, Lombardy, Italy.

Varzi may also refer to:

- Achille Varzi (1904–1948), Italian racecar driver
- Achille Varzi (philosopher) (born 1958), Italian philosopher
- Elena Varzi (1926–2014), Italian actress
- Mortezâ Varzi (1922–2004), Iranian musician
- Roxanne Varzi (born 1971), Iranian-American anthropologist, academic, and filmmaker

== See also ==
- Lazaros Varzis (fl. late-19th/early-20th centuries), Greek chieftain of the Macedonian Struggle
- Varzy, a commune of Nièvre département, France
