= Theofanis Siatisteus =

Greek fighter of the Greek War of Independence

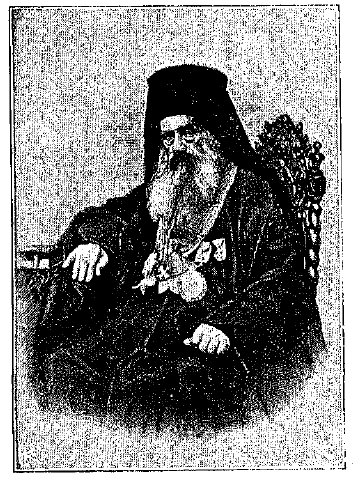
Theofanis Siatisteus

Theofanis Siatisteus (Greek: Θεοφάνης Σιατιστεύς; Selitsa, Voio, died 1868) was a fighter in the Greek War of Independence and a cleric.
