= Akritas =

Akritas or Acritas may refer to:

- Akritas, Kilkis, a village in the Kilkas regional unit of Greece
- Akritas, Florina, a village in the Florina regional unit of Greece
- Cape Akritas in Peloponnese Greece
- Akritas, the Greek name of Tuzla, Istanbul
- Digenes Akritas

== See also ==
- Akitas
- Akrites
