= Pantelis Kandilas =

Greek soldier

Kapetan (Chieftain) Pantelis Kandilas
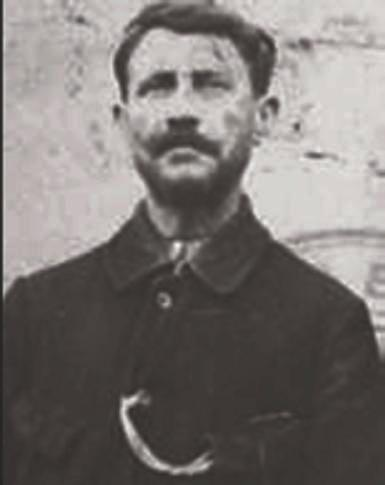
- Kandilas during the Macedonian Struggle.
- Native name: Παντελής Κανδύλας
- Born: c. 1860s Vogatsiko, Monastir Vilayet, Ottoman Empire (now Greece)
- Allegiance: Kingdom of Greece
- Service / branch: Hellenic Army; HMC
- Battles / wars: 1896–1897 Greek Macedonian rebellion Greco-Turkish War (1897); Macedonian Struggle (POW)

Pantelis Kandilas (Greek: Παντελής Κανδύλας) was a Greek chieftain of the Macedonian Struggle.

== Biography ==
Kandilas was born in Vogatsiko of Kastoria in the 1860s. He participated in the 1896–1897 Greek Macedonian rebellion and in the Greco-Turkish War (1897). In 1904 he set up an armed group consisting of 5 men. In the same year he met with Pavlos Melas, whom he accompanied to Lechovo in Florina. He was appointed the leader of an armed group, cooperating with Georgios Tsontos, with whom he participated in many operations in Kastanohoria and Voio. He took part in the operation of the village of Libisovo (now Agios Ilias) in the prefecture of Kastoria, where the komitadji Konstanto Zifkov was killed. In 1905 he was arrested by the Ottoman authorities, with other men of the chieftain Alexandros Karalivanos and was sentenced to three years’ imprisonment.
