= History of modern Greece =

The history of modern Greece covers the history of Greece from the recognition by the Great Powers — the United Kingdom, France and Russia — of its independence from the Ottoman Empire in 1828 to the present day.

== Background ==
The Byzantine Empire had ruled most of the Greek-speaking world since late Antiquity, but experienced a decline as a result of Muslim Arab and Seljuk Turkish invasions and was fatally weakened by the sacking of Constantinople by the Latin Crusaders in 1204. The establishment of Catholic Latin states on Greek soil, and the struggles of the Orthodox Byzantine Greeks against them, led to the emergence of a distinct Greek national identity. The Byzantine Empire was restored by the Palaiologos dynasty in 1261, but it was a shadow of its former self, and constant civil wars and foreign attacks in the 14th century brought about its terminal decline. As a result, most of Greece gradually became part of the Ottoman Empire in the late 14th and early 15th centuries, culminating in the Fall of Constantinople in 1453, the conquest of the Duchy of Athens in 1458, and of the Despotate of the Morea in 1460.

The flag of Filiki Eteria

Ottoman control was largely absent in the mountainous interior of Greece, and many fled there, often becoming brigands. Otherwise, only the islands of the Aegean and a few coastal fortresses on the mainland, under Venetian and Genoese rule, remained free from Ottoman rule, but by the mid-16th century, the Ottomans had conquered most of them as well. Rhodes fell in 1522, Cyprus in 1571, and the Venetians retained Crete until 1670. The Ionian Islands were only briefly ruled by the Ottomans (Kefalonia from 1479 to 1481 and from 1485 to 1500), and remained primarily under the rule of Venice.

The first large-scale insurrection against Ottoman rule was the Orlov Revolt of the early 1770s, but it was brutally repressed. The same time, however, also marks the start of the Modern Greek Enlightenment, as Greeks who studied in Western Europe brought knowledge and ideas back to their homeland, and as Greek merchants and shipowners increased their wealth. As a result, especially in the aftermath of the French Revolution, liberal and nationalist ideas began to spread across the Greek lands.

In 1821, the Greeks rose up against the Ottoman Empire. Initial successes were followed by infighting, which almost caused the Greek struggle to collapse; nevertheless, the prolongation of the fight forced the Great Powers (Britain, Russia and France) to recognize the claims of the Greek rebels to separate statehood (Treaty of London) and intervene against the Ottomans at the Battle of Navarino. Greece was initially to be an autonomous state under Ottoman suzerainty, but by 1832, in the Treaty of Constantinople, it was recognized as a fully independent kingdom. In the meantime, the 3rd National Assembly of the Greek insurgents called upon Ioannis Kapodistrias, a former foreign minister of Russia, to take over the governance of the fledgling state in 1827.

== Administration of Ioannis Kapodistrias ==
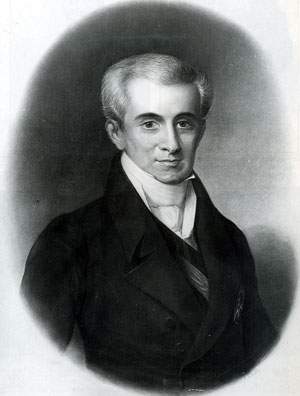
Ioannis Kapodistrias

On his arrival, Kapodistrias launched a major reform and modernisation programme that covered all areas. He re-established military unity by bringing an end to the second phase of the civil war; re-organised the military, which was then able to reconquer territory lost to the Ottoman military during the civil wars; and introduced the first modern quarantine system in Greece, which brought diseases such as typhoid fever, cholera and dysentery under control for the first time since the start of the War of Independence.

Kapodistrias also negotiated with the Great Powers and the Ottoman Empire to establish the borders and degree of independence of the Greek state; signed the peace treaty that ended the War of Independence with the Ottomans; introduced the phoenix, the first modern Greek currency; organised local administration; and, in an effort to raise the living standards of the population, introduced the cultivation of the potato into Greece.

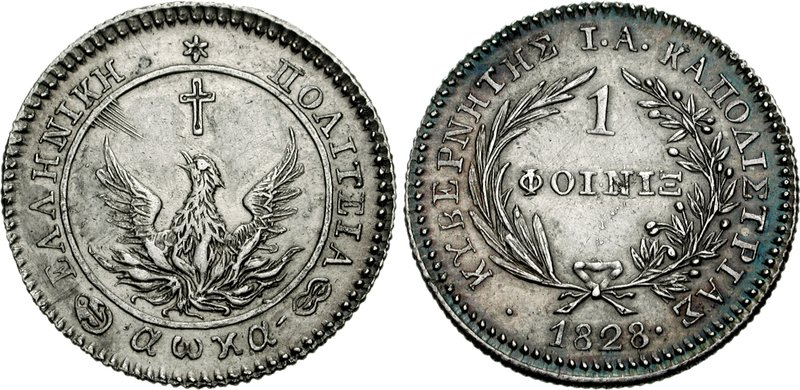
Face and Obverse of a Phoenix coin.

Furthermore, he tried to undermine the authority of the traditional clans (or dynasties) that he considered the useless legacy of a bygone and obsolete era. However, he underestimated the political and military strength of the capetanei (καπεταναίοι – captains) who had led the revolt against Ottoman Empire in 1821, and who had expected a leadership role in the post-revolution Government. When a dispute between the captains of Laconia and the appointed governor of the province escalated into an armed conflict, he called in Russian troops to restore order, because much of the army was controlled by captains who had been part of the rebellion.

George Finlay's 1861 History of Greek Revolution records that by 1831 Kapodistrias's government had become hated, chiefly by the independent Maniots, but also by the Roumeliotes and the rich and influential merchant families of Hydra, Spetses and Psara. The customs dues of the inhabitants of Hydra were the chief source of revenue for these municipalities, and they refused to hand these over to Kapodistrias. It appears that Kapodistrias had refused to convene the National Assembly and was ruling as a despot, possibly influenced by his Russian experiences. The municipality of Hydra instructed Admiral Miaoulis and Alexandros Mavrokordatos to go to Poros and seize the Hellenic Navy's fleet there. This Miaoulis did so with the intention of preventing a blockade of the islands, so for a time it seemed as if the National Assembly would be called.

Kapodistrias called on the British and French residents to support him in putting down the rebellion, but this they refused to do. Nonetheless, an Admiral Rikord (or Ricord) took his ships north to Poros. Colonel (later General) Kallergis took a half-trained force of Greek Army regulars and a force of irregulars in support. With less than 200 men, Miaoulis was unable to make much of a fight; Fort Heidek on Bourtzi Island was overrun by the regulars and the brig Spetses (once Laskarina Bouboulina's Agamemnon) sunk by Ricord's force. Encircled by the Russians in the harbor and Kallergis' force on land, Poros surrendered. Miaoulis was forced to set charges in the flagship Hellas and the corvette Hydra to blow them up when he and his handful of followers returned to Hydra. Kallergis' men were enraged by the loss of the ships and sacked Poros, carrying off plunder to Nafplio.

The loss of the best ships in the fleet crippled the Hellenic Navy for many years, but it also weakened Kapodistrias' position. He did finally call the National Assembly, but his other actions triggered more opposition and that led to his downfall.

== Assassination of Kapodistrias and the creation of the Kingdom of Greece ==
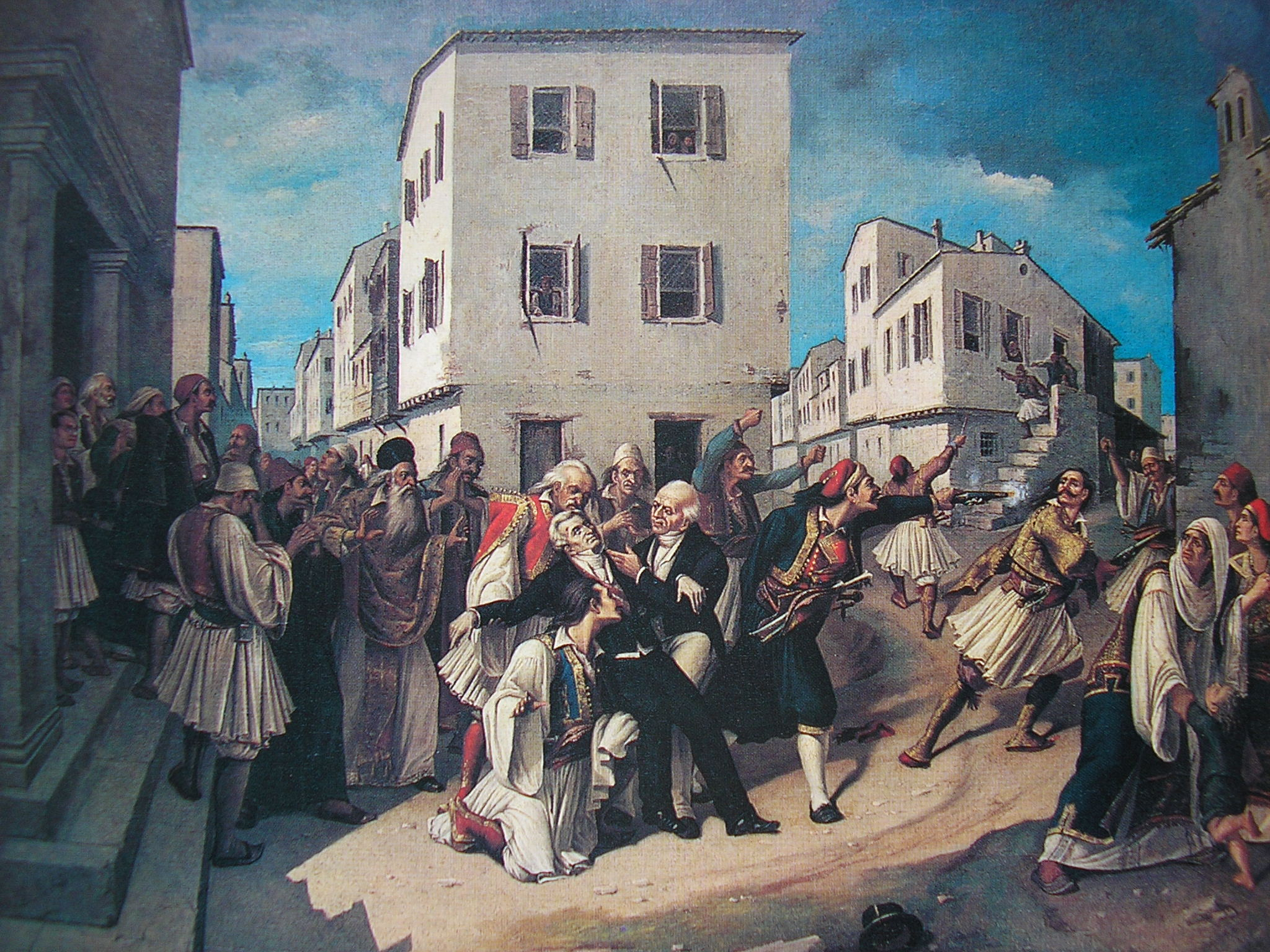
The murder of Ioannis Kapodistrias by Charalambos Pachis.

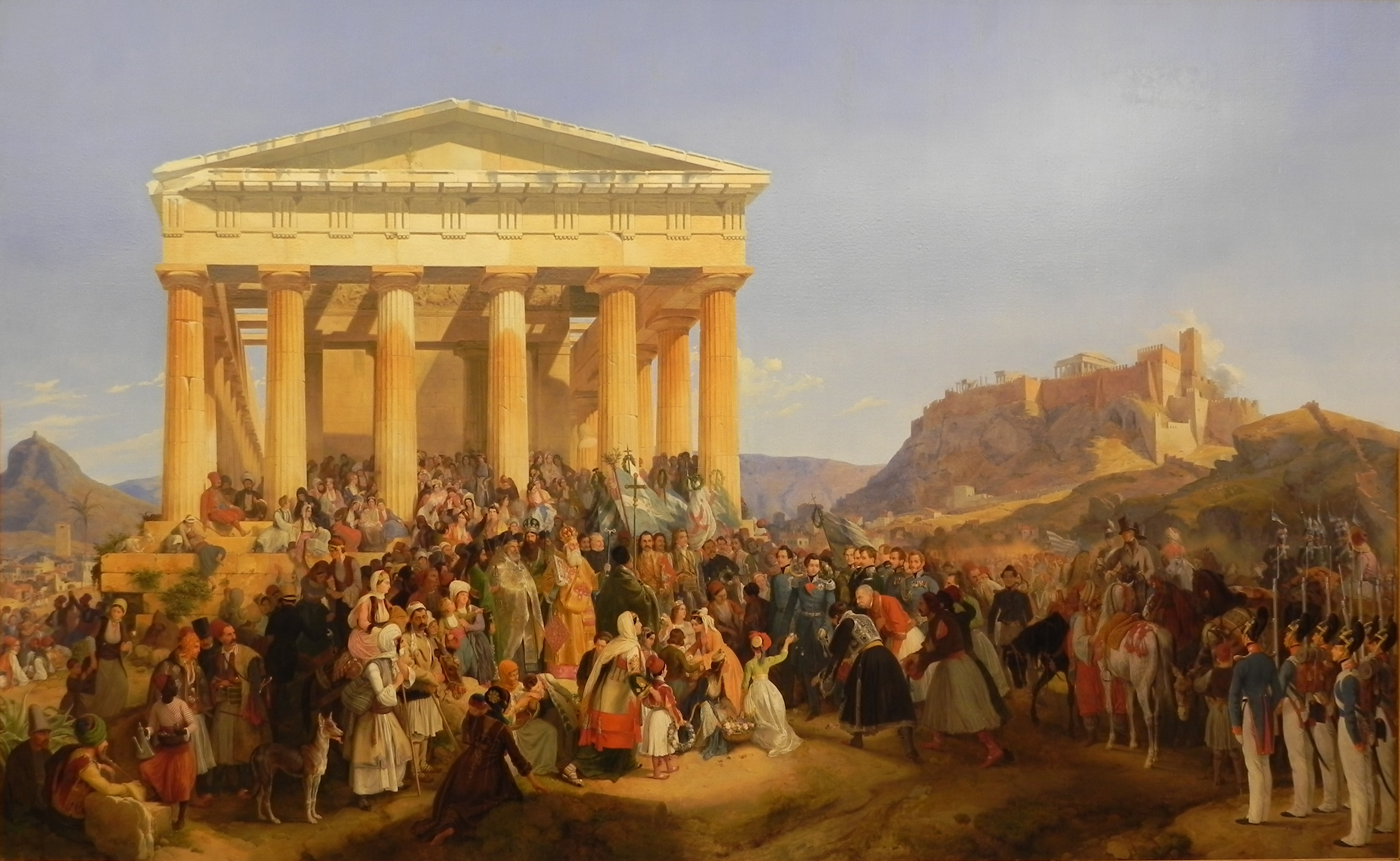
The Entry of King Otto of Greece into Athens by Peter von Hess.

In 1831, Kapodistrias ordered the imprisonment of Petrobey Mavromichalis, the Bey of the Mani Peninsula, one of the wildest and most rebellious parts of Greece. This was a mortal offence to the Mavromichalis family, and on 9 October 1831 (27 September in the Julian Calendar) Kapodistrias was assassinated by Petros' brother Konstantis and son Georgios on the steps of the church of Saint Spyridon in Nafplio.

Ioannis Kapodistrias was succeeded as Governor by his younger brother, Augustinos Kapodistrias. Augustinos ruled only for six months, during which the country was very much plunged into chaos. Under the protocol signed at the London Conference of 1832 on 7 May 1832 between Bavaria and the protecting Powers, Greece was defined as an independent kingdom, free of Ottoman control, with the Arta-Volos line as its northern frontier. The protocol also dealt with the way in which a Regency was to be managed until Otto of Bavaria reached his majority to assume the throne of Greece. The Ottoman Empire was indemnified in the sum of 40,000,000 piastres for the loss of territory in the new kingdom.

== Reign of King Otto, 1833–1863 ==
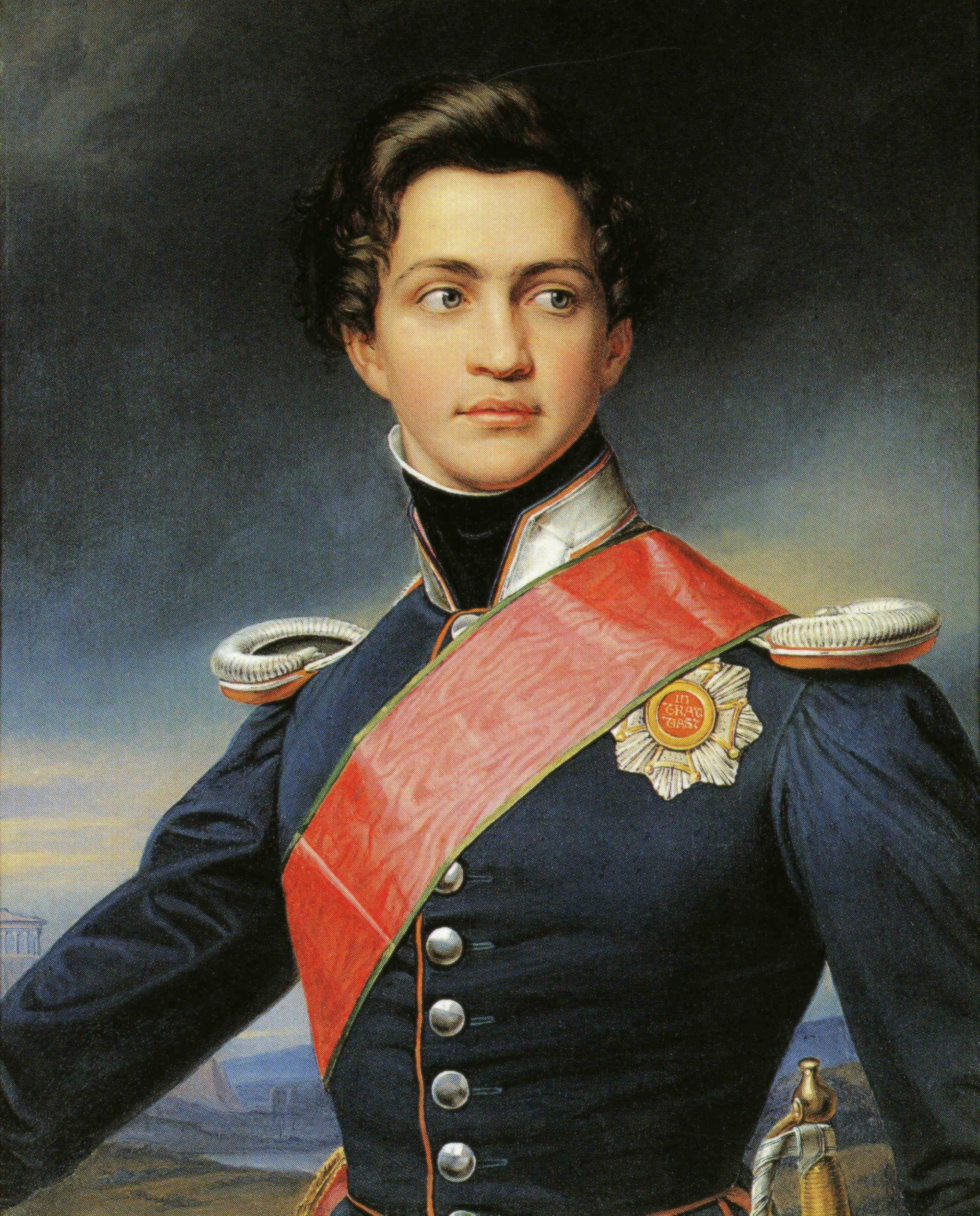
Otto, the first King of modern Greece.

Otto's reign would prove troubled, but he managed to hang on for 30 years before he and his wife, Queen Amalia, left the same way they came, aboard a British warship. During the early years of his reign, a group of Bavarian regents ruled in his name, and they made themselves very unpopular by trying to impose German ideas of rigid hierarchical government on the Greeks, while keeping most significant state offices away from them. Nevertheless, they laid the foundations of a Greek administration, army, justice system and education system. Otto was sincere in his desire to give Greece good government, but he suffered from two great handicaps: his Roman Catholic faith and his childless marriage to Queen Amalia. This meant he could neither be crowned as King of Greece under the Orthodox rite nor establish a dynasty.

Otto came of age in 1835 and assumed the reins of government, but Bavarians remained as heads of the government until 1837. Otto thereafter appointed Greek ministers, although Bavarian officials still ran much of the army. At this time, Greece still had no legislature and no constitution. Discontent at the continued "Bavarocracy" grew until the 3 September 1843 Revolution broke out in Athens. Otto agreed to grant a constitution and convened a National Assembly that met in November of the same year. The Greek Constitution of 1844 then created a bicameral parliament consisting of an Assembly (Vouli) and a Senate (Gerousia). Power then passed into the hands of a group of Greek politicians, most of whom who had been commanders in the War of Independence against the Ottomans.

Greek politics in the 19th century was dominated by the "national question". The majority of Greeks continued to live under Ottoman rule, and Greeks dreamed of liberating them all and reconstituting a state embracing all the Greek lands, with Constantinople as its capital. This was called the Great Idea (Megali Idea), and it was sustained by almost continuous rebellions against Ottoman rule in Greek-speaking territories, particularly Crete, Thessaly and Macedonia.

When the Crimean War broke out in 1854, Greece saw an opportunity to gain Ottoman-controlled territory that had large Greek populations. Greece, an Orthodox nation, had considerable support in Russia, but the Russian government decided it was too dangerous to help Greece expand its holdings. When the Russians attacked the Ottoman forces, Greece invaded Thessaly and Epirus. To block further Greek moves, the British and French occupied the main Greek port at Piraeus from April 1854 to February 1857. The Greeks, gambling on a Russian victory, incited the large-scale Epirus Revolt of 1854 as well as uprisings in Crete. The revolts failed and Greece made no gains during the Crimean War, which Russia lost.

A new generation of Greek politicians was growing increasingly intolerant of King Otto's continuing interference in government. In 1862, the King dismissed his prime minister, the former admiral Konstantinos Kanaris, the most prominent politician of the period. This provoked a military rebellion, forcing Otto to accept the inevitable and leave the country.

The Greeks then asked Britain to send Queen Victoria's son Prince Alfred as their new king, but this was vetoed by the other Powers. Instead, a young Danish Prince became King George I. George was a very popular choice as a constitutional monarch, and he agreed that his sons would be raised in the Greek Orthodox faith. As a reward to the Greeks for adopting a pro-British King, Britain ceded the Ionian Islands to Greece.

== Reign of King George I, 1864–1913 ==
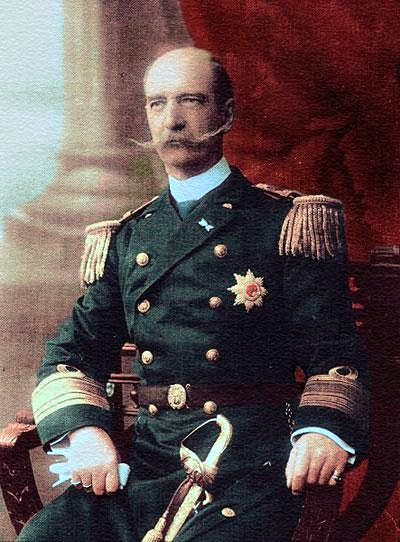
King George I of the Hellenes in Hellenic Navy uniform.

At the urging of Britain and King George, Greece adopted the much more democratic Greek Constitution of 1864. The powers of the King were reduced, the Senate was abolished, and the franchise was extended to all adult males. Approval voting was used in elections, with one urn for each candidate divided into "yes" and "no" portions into which voters dropped lead beads. Nevertheless, Greek politics remained heavily dynastic, as it has always been. Family names such as Zaimis, Rallis and Trikoupis occurred repeatedly as prime ministers.

Although parties were centered around the individual leaders, often bearing their names, two broad political tendencies existed: the liberals, led first by Charilaos Trikoupis and later by Eleftherios Venizelos, and the conservatives, led initially by Theodoros Deligiannis and later by Thrasivoulos Zaimis. Trikoupis and Deligiannis dominated Greek politics in the later 19th century, alternating in office. Trikoupis favoured co-operation with Great Britain in foreign affairs, the creation of infrastructure and an indigenous industry, raising protective tariffs and progressive social legislation, while the more populist Deligiannis depended on the promotion of Greek nationalism and the Megali Idea.

Greece remained a very poor country throughout the 19th century. The country lacked raw materials, infrastructure and capital. Agriculture was mostly at the subsistence level, and the only important export commodities were currants, raisins and tobacco. Some Greeks grew rich as merchants and shipowners, and Piraeus became a major port, but little of this wealth found its way to the Greek peasantry. Greece remained hopelessly in debt to London finance houses.

By the 1890s, Greece was virtually bankrupt. Poverty was rife in the rural areas and the islands, and was eased only by large-scale emigration to the United States. There was little education in the rural areas. Nevertheless, there was progress in building communications and infrastructure, and fine public buildings were erected in Athens. The capital staged the revival of the Olympic Games in 1896, which proved a great success.

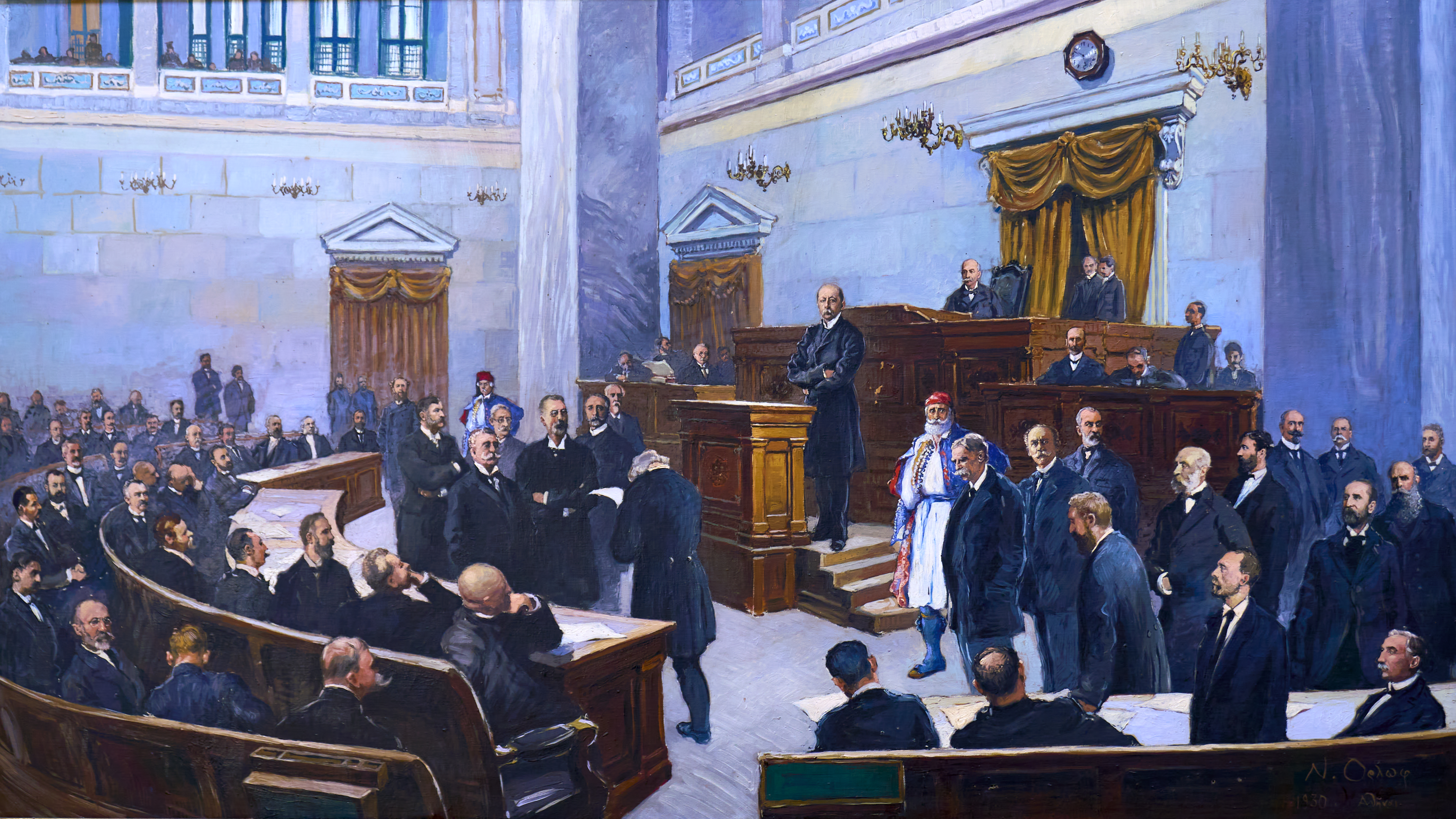
The Hellenic Parliament in the 1880s, with PM Charilaos Trikoupis standing at the podium.

The parliamentary process developed greatly in Greece during the reign of George I. Initially, the royal prerogative in choosing his prime minister remained and contributed to governmental instability, until the introduction of the dedilomeni principle of parliamentary confidence in 1875 by the reformist Charilaos Trikoupis. Clientelism and frequent electoral upheavals however remained the norm in Greek politics, and frustrated the country's development.

Corruption and Trikoupis' increased spending (to create necessary infrastructure such as the Corinth Canal) overtaxed the weak Greek economy, forcing the declaration of public insolvency in 1893 and to accept the imposition of an International Financial Control authority to pay off the country's creditors.

Another political issue in 19th-century Greece was the Greek language question. The Greek people spoke a form of Greek called Demotic. Many of the educated elite saw this as a peasant dialect and were determined to restore the glories of Ancient Greek. Government documents and newspapers were consequently published in Katharevousa (purified) Greek, a form that few ordinary Greeks could read. Liberals favoured recognising Demotic as the national language, but conservatives and the Orthodox Church resisted all such efforts, to the extent that when the New Testament was translated into Demotic in 1901, riots erupted in Athens and the government fell (the Evangeliaka). This issue would continue to plague Greek politics until the 1970s.

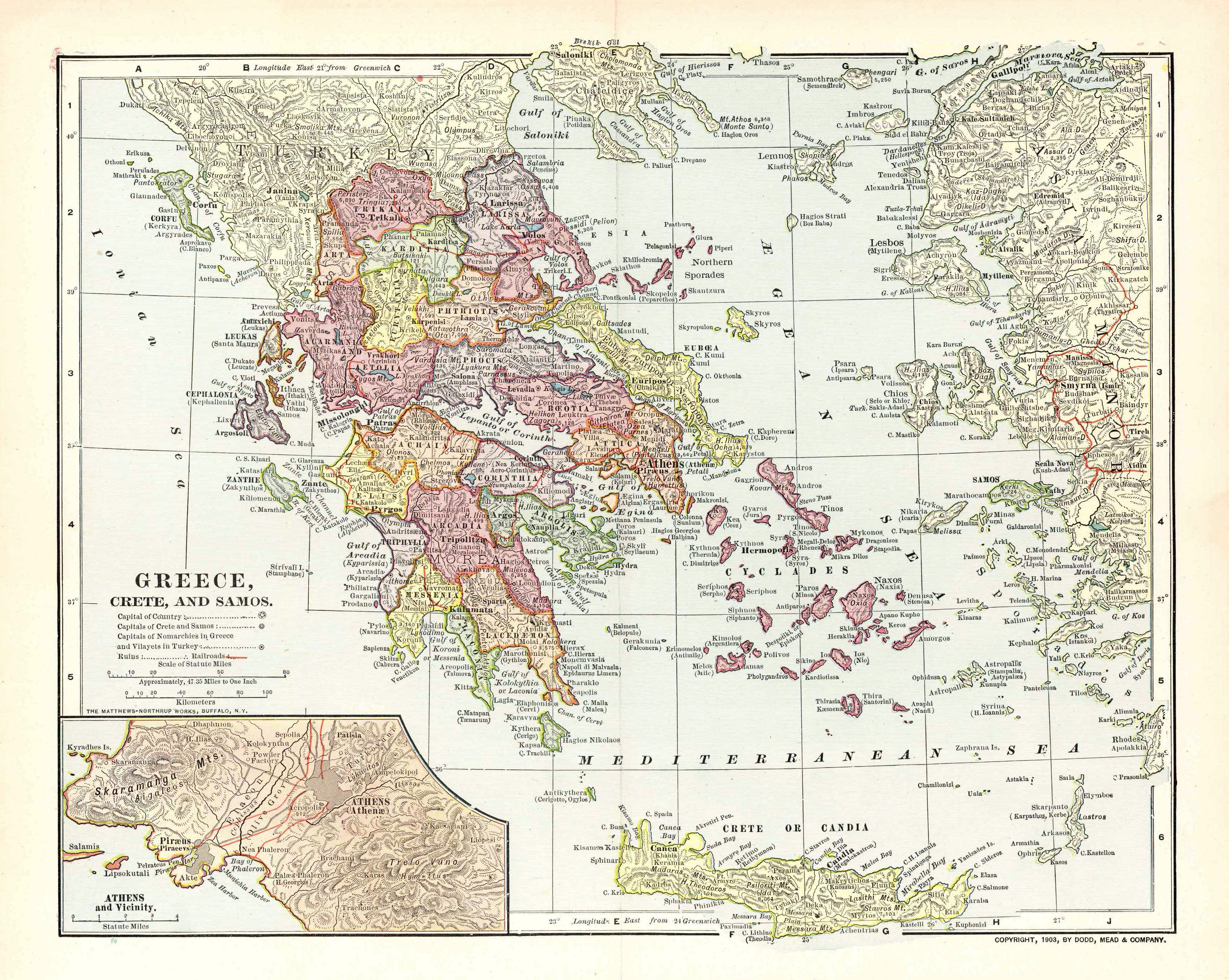
Map of the Kingdom of Greece, the Cretan State and the Principality of Samos in 1903, before the Balkan Wars.

All Greeks were united, however, in their determination to liberate the Greek-speaking provinces of the Ottoman Empire. Especially in Crete, the Cretan Revolt (1866–1869) raised nationalist fervour. When war broke out between Russian and the Ottomans in the Russo-Turkish War (1877–1878), Greek popular sentiment rallied to Russia's side, but Greece was too poor and too concerned about British intervention to enter the war officially. Nevertheless, in 1881, Thessaly and small parts of Epirus were ceded to Greece as part of the Treaty of Berlin.

Greeks in Crete continued to stage regular revolts, and in 1897, the Greek government under Theodoros Deligiannis, bowing to popular pressure, declared war on the Ottomans. In the ensuing Greco-Turkish War of 1897, the badly trained and equipped Greek army was defeated by the Ottomans. Through the intervention of the Great Powers however, Greece lost only a little territory along the border to Turkey, while Crete was established as an autonomous state under Prince George of Greece as the Cretan State.

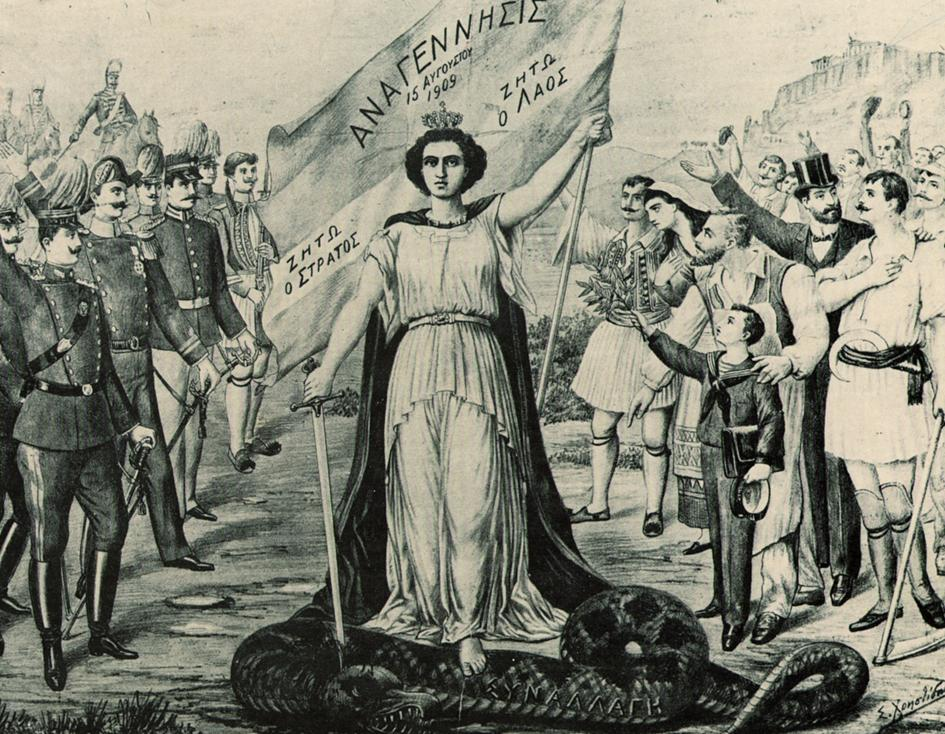
Popular lithograph celebrating the success of the Goudi pronunciamiento of 1909 as a national rebirth.

Nationalist sentiment among Greeks in the Ottoman Empire continued to grow, and by the 1890s there were constant disturbances in Macedonia. Here, the Greeks were in competition not only with the Ottomans, but also with the Bulgarians, in an armed propaganda struggle for the hearts and minds of the ethnically mixed local population, the so-called "Macedonian Struggle".

In July 1908, the Young Turk Revolution broke out in the Ottoman Empire. Taking advantage of the Ottoman internal turmoil, Austria-Hungary annexed Bosnia and Herzegovina and Bulgaria declared its independence from the Ottoman Empire. On Crete, the local population, led by a young politician named Eleftherios Venizelos, declared Enosis, union with Greece, provoking another crisis. The fact that the Greek government, led by Dimitrios Rallis, proved unable to likewise take advantage of the situation and bring Crete into the fold, rankled many Greeks, especially young military officers. These formed a secret society, the "Military League", with the purpose of emulating their Ottoman colleagues to seek governmental reforms.

The resulting Goudi coup on 15 August 1909 marked a watershed in modern Greek history: as the military conspirators were inexperienced in politics, they asked Venizelos, who had impeccable liberal credentials, to come to Greece as their political adviser. Venizelos quickly established himself as a powerful political figure, and his allies won the August 1910 elections. Venizelos became prime minister in October 1910, ushering a period of 25 years where his personality would dominate Greek politics.

Venizelos initiated a major reform program, including a new and more liberal constitution and reforms in the spheres of public administration, education and economy. French and British military missions were invited for the army and navy respectively, and arms purchases were made. In the meantime, the Ottoman Empire's weaknesses were revealed by the ongoing Italo-Turkish War in Libya.

=== Balkan Wars ===
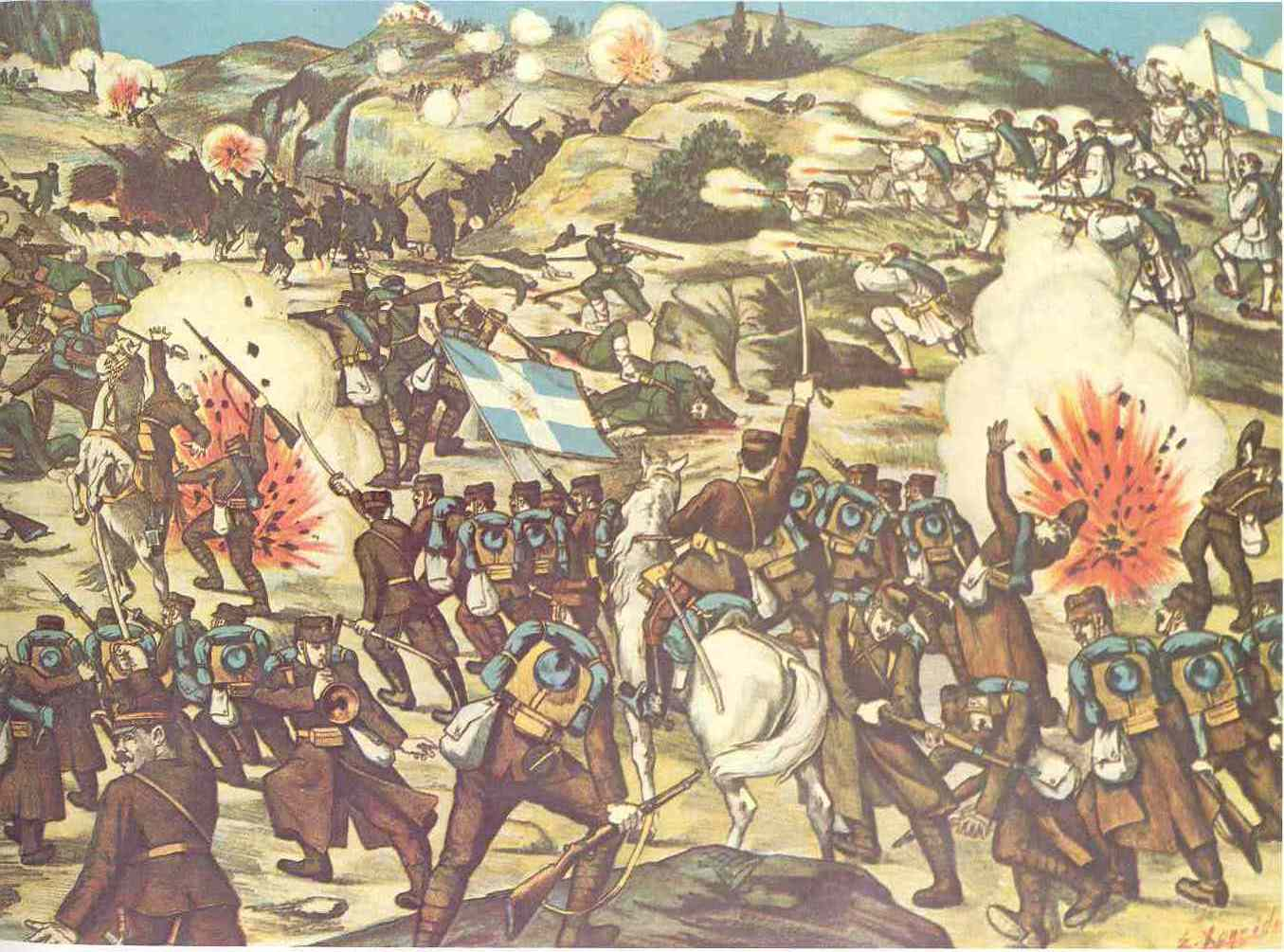
Greek lithograph of the Battle of Kilkis–Lachanas

Through the spring of 1912, a series of bilateral agreements between the Christian Balkan states (Greece, Bulgaria, Montenegro and Serbia) formed the Balkan League, which in October 1912 declared war on the Ottoman Empire. In the First Balkan War, the Ottomans were defeated on all fronts, and the four allies rushed to grab as much territory as they could. The Greeks occupied Thessaloniki just ahead of the Bulgarians, and also took much of Epirus with Ioannina, as well as Crete and the Aegean Islands.

The Treaty of London (1913) ended the war, but no one was left satisfied, and soon, the four allies fell out over the partition of Macedonia. In June 1913, Bulgaria attacked Greece and Serbia, beginning the Second Balkan War, but was beaten back. The Treaty of Bucharest (1913), which concluded the Second Balkan War, left Greece with southern Epirus, the southern half of Macedonia (known as Greek Macedonia), Crete and the Aegean islands, except for the Dodecanese, which had been occupied by Italy since 1911. These gains nearly doubled Greece's area and population.

In March 1913, an anarchist, Alexandros Schinas, assassinated King George in Thessaloniki, and his son came to the throne as Constantine I. Constantine was the first Greek king born in Greece and the first to be Greek Orthodox by birth. His very name had been chosen in the spirit of romantic Greek nationalism (the Megali Idea), evoking the Byzantine emperors of that name. In addition, as the Commander-in-chief of the Greek Army during the Balkan Wars, his popularity was enormous, rivalled only by that of Venizelos, his prime minister.

== World War I and subsequent crises, 1914-1922 ==
When World War I broke out in 1914, the King and his prime minister Venizelos both preferred to maintain a neutral stance, in spite of Greece's treaty of alliance with Serbia, which had been attacked by Austria-Hungary as the first belligerent action of the conflict. But when the Allies asked for Greek help in the Dardanelles campaign of 1915, offering Cyprus in exchange, their diverging views became apparent: Constantine had been educated in Germany, was married to Sophia of Prussia, sister of Kaiser Wilhelm, and was convinced of the Central Powers' victory. Venizelos, on the other hand, was an ardent anglophile, and believed in an Allied victory.

Since Greece, a maritime country, could not oppose the mighty British navy, and citing the need for a respite after two wars, King Constantine favored continued neutrality, while Venizelos actively sought Greek entry in the war on the Allied side. Venizelos resigned, but won the Greek elections of 1915 and again formed the government. When Bulgaria entered the war as a German ally in October 1915, Venizelos invited Allied forces into Greece (the Salonika front), for which he was again dismissed by Constantine.

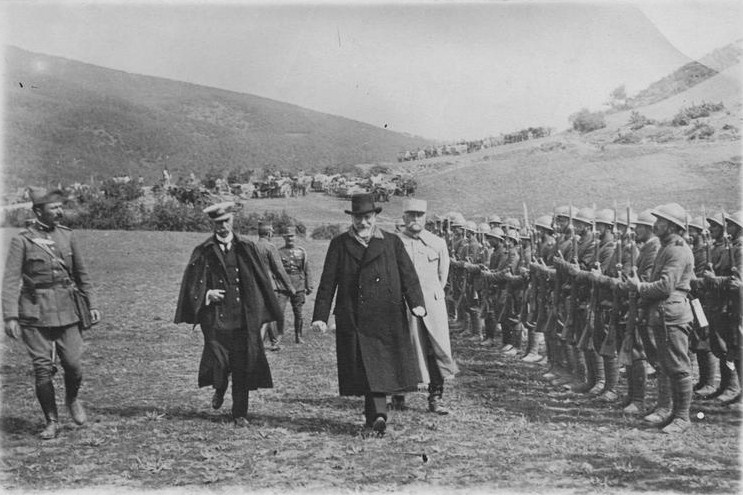
Venizelos reviews a section of the Greek army on the Macedonian front during the First World War, 1917. He is accompanied by Admiral Pavlos Koundouriotis (left) and General Maurice Sarrail (right).

In August 1916, after several incidents in which both sides in the war had encroached upon the still theoretically neutral Greek territory, Venizelist officers rose up in Allied-controlled Thessaloniki and Venizelos established a separate government there known as the result of a so-called Movement of National Defence. Constantine was now ruling only in what was Greece before the Balkan Wars ("Old Greece"), and his government was subject to repeated humiliations from the Allies. In November 1916 the French occupied Piraeus, bombarded Athens and forced the Greek fleet to surrender. The royalist troops fired at them, leading to a battle between French and Greek royalist troops. There were also riots against supporters of Venizelos in Athens (the Noemvriana).

Following the February Revolution in Russia in 1917, the Tsar's support for his cousin Constantine was eliminated, and he was forced to leave the country, without actually abdicating, in June 1917. His second son Alexander became King, while the remaining royal family and the most prominent royalists followed him into exile. Venizelos now led a superficially united Greece into the war on the Allied side, but underneath the surface, the division of Greek society into Venizelists and anti-Venizelists, the so-called National Schism, became more entrenched.

=== Greco-Turkish War (1919–1922) ===
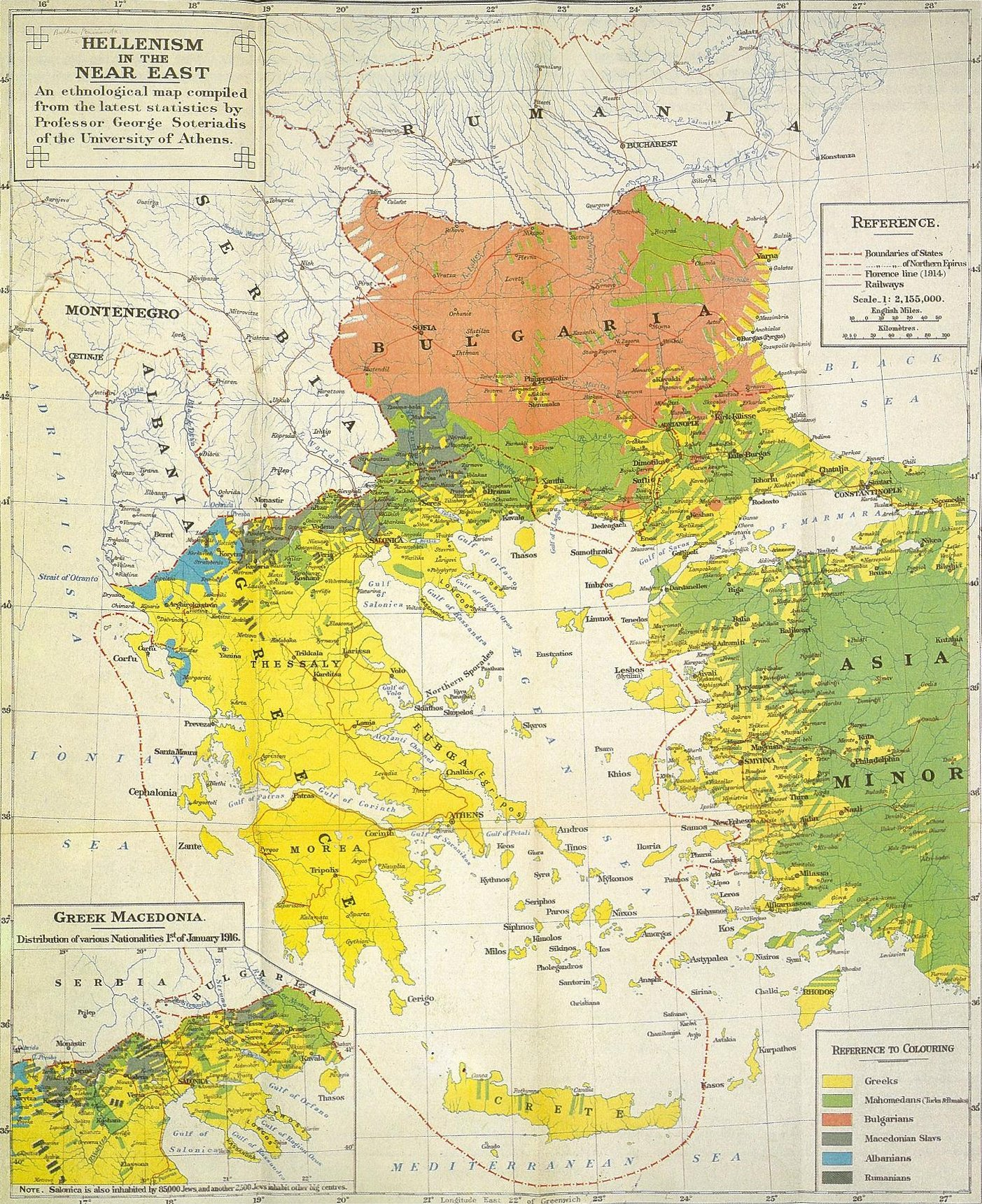
The Greek Kingdom and the Greek diaspora in the Balkans and western Asia Minor, according to a 1919 map submitted to the Paris Peace Conference.

With the end of the war in November 1918, the moribund Ottoman Empire was ready to be carved up among the victors, and Greece now expected the Allies to deliver on their promises. In no small measure through the diplomatic efforts of Venizelos, Greece secured Western Thrace in the Treaty of Neuilly in November 1919 and Eastern Thrace and a zone around Smyrna in western Anatolia (already under Greek administration as the Occupation of Smyrna since May 1919) in the Treaty of Sèvres of August 1920. The future of Constantinople was left to be determined. But at the same time, a Turkish National Movement rose in Turkey led by Mustafa Kemal (later Kemal Atatürk), who set up a rival government in Ankara and was engaged in fighting the Greek army.

Map of the military developments during the Greco-Turkish War (1919–1922).

At this point, the fulfillment of the Megali Idea seemed near. Yet so deep was the rift in Greek society that on his return to Greece, an assassination attempt was made on Venizelos by two royalist former officers. Even more surprisingly, Venizelos' Liberal Party lost the Greek elections of November 1920, and in the Greek plebiscite of 1920, the Greek people voted for the return of King Constantine from exile after the sudden death of King Alexander.

The United Opposition, which had campaigned on the slogan of an end to the Asia Minor Campaign in Anatolia, instead intensified it. But the royalist restoration had dire consequences: many veteran Venizelist officers were dismissed or left the army, while Italy and France found the return of the hated Constantine a useful pretext for switching their support to Kemal. Finally, in August 1922, the Turkish army shattered the Greek front, and took Smyrna in an operation that led to the disastrous Great Fire of Smyrna.

The Greek army evacuated not only Anatolia, but also Eastern Thrace and the islands of Imbros and Tenedos in accordance with the terms of the Treaty of Lausanne (1923). A population exchange between Greece and Turkey was agreed between the two countries, with over 1.5 million Christians and almost half a million Muslims being uprooted. This catastrophe marked the end of the Megali Idea, and left Greece financially exhausted, demoralized, and having to house and feed a proportionately huge number of Greek refugees.

== Republic and Monarchy (1922–1940) ==
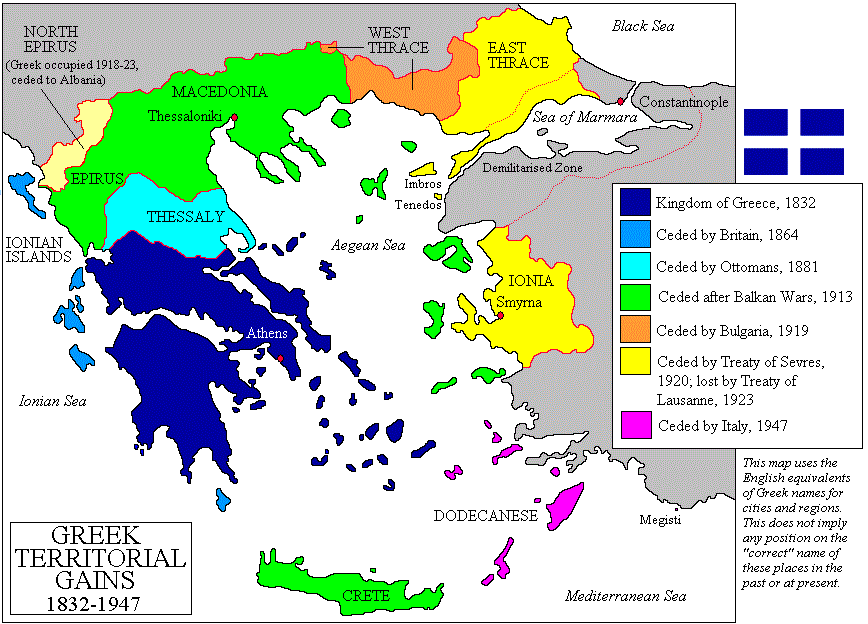
Greek territorial changes between 1821 and 1947, showing territories awarded to Greece in 1919 and those lost in 1923.

The catastrophe deepened the political crisis, with the returning army rising up under Venizelist officers and forcing King Constantine to abdicate again, in September 1922, in favour of his firstborn son, George II. The "Revolutionary Committee" headed by Colonels Stylianos Gonatas (soon to become prime minister) and Nikolaos Plastiras engaged in a witch-hunt against the royalists, culminating in the "Trial of the Six".

The Greek election of 1923 was held to form a National Assembly with powers to draft a new constitution. Following a failed royalist Leonardopoulos-Gargalidis coup attempt, the monarchist parties abstained, leading to a landslide for the Liberals and their allies. King George II was asked to leave the country, and on 25 March 1924, Alexandros Papanastasiou proclaimed the Second Hellenic Republic, ratified by the Greek plebiscite of 1924 a month later.

However, the new Republic was built on unstable foundations. The National Schism lived on, as the monarchists, with the exception of Ioannis Metaxas, did not acknowledge the Venizelist-sponsored Republican regime. The army, which had power and provided many of the leading proponents of both sides, became a factor to be reckoned with, prone to intervene in politics.

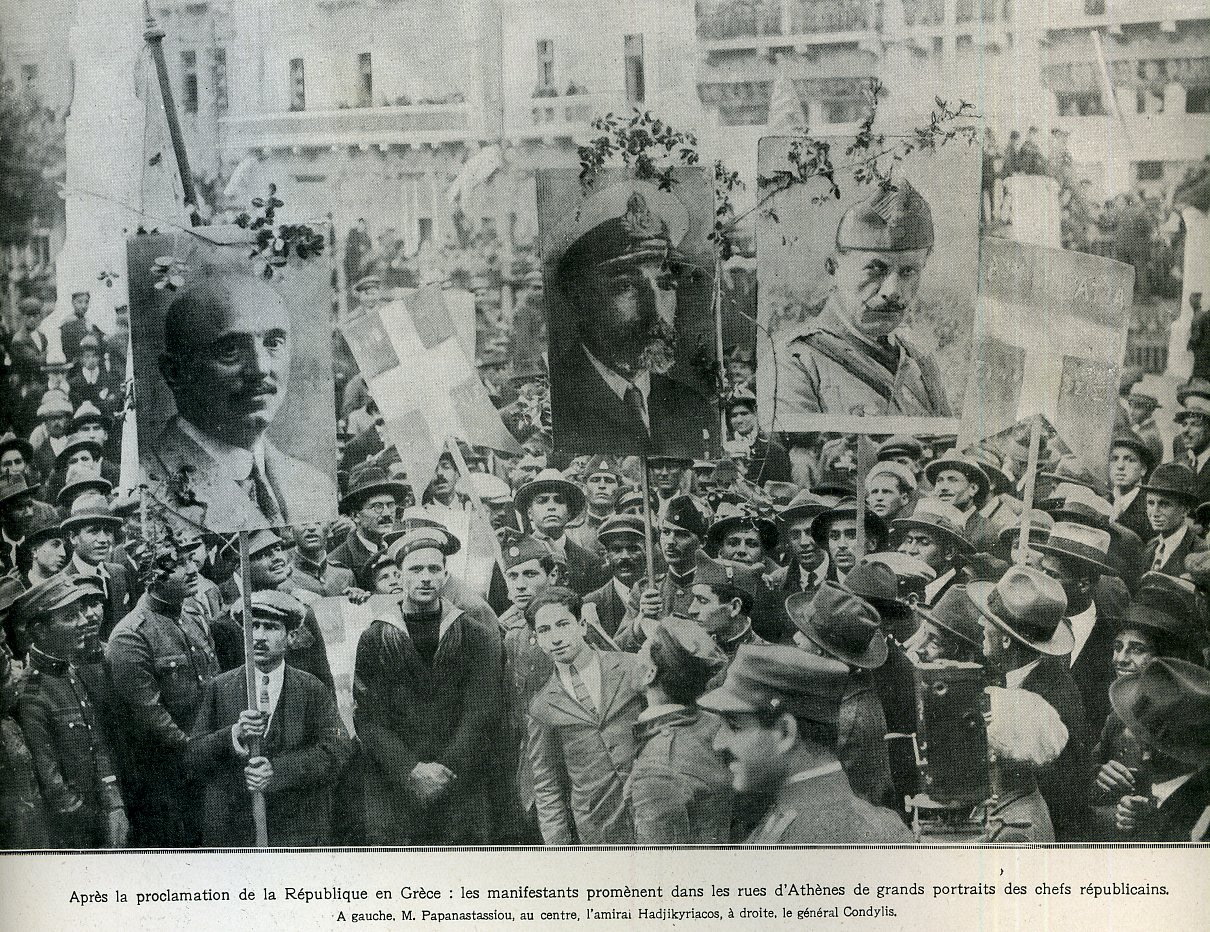
Crowds celebrating in Athens the proclamation of the Republic, 1924, with placards of republican leaders Papanastasiou, Hatzikyriakos and Kondylis.

Greece was diplomatically isolated and vulnerable, as the Corfu incident of 1923 showed, and the economic foundations of the state were in ruins after a decade of war and the sudden increase of the country's population by a quarter. The refugees, however, also brought a new air into Greece. They were impoverished now, but before 1922 many had been entrepreneurs and well-educated. Staunch supporters of Venizelos and the Republic, many would radicalize and play a leading role in the nascent Communist Party of Greece.

In June 1925, General Theodoros Pangalos launched a coup and ruled as a dictator for a year until a counter-coup by another General, Georgios Kondylis, unseated him and restored the Republic. In the meantime, Pangalos managed to embroil Greece in a short-lived war with Bulgaria precipitated by the Incident at Petrich and make unacceptable concessions in Thessaloniki and its hinterland to Yugoslavia in an effort to gain its support for his revanchist policies against Turkey.

In 1928, Venizelos returned from exile. After a landslide victory in the Greek election of 1928, he formed a government. This was the only cabinet of the Second Republic to run its full four-year term, and the work it left behind was considerable. Alongside domestic reforms, Venizelos restored Greece's frayed international relations, even initiating a Greco-Turkish reconciliation with a visit to Ankara and the signing of a Friendship Agreement in 1930.

The Great Depression hit Greece, an already poor country dependent on agricultural exports, particularly hard. Matters were made worse by the closing off of emigration to the United States, the traditional safety valve of rural poverty. High unemployment and consequent social unrest resulted, and the Communist Party of Greece made rapid advances. Venizelos was forced to default on Greece's national debt in 1932, and he fell from office after the Greek elections of 1932. He was succeeded by a monarchist coalition government led by Panagis Tsaldaris of the People's Party.

Two failed Venizelist military coups followed in 1933 and 1935 in an effort to preserve the Republic, but they had the opposite effect. On 10 October 1935, a few months after he suppressed the 1935 Greek coup d'état attempt, Georgios Kondylis, the former Venizelist stalwart, abolished the Republic in another coup, and declared the monarchy restored. The rigged Greek plebiscite of 1935 confirmed the regime change (with an unsurprising 97.88% of votes), and King George II returned.

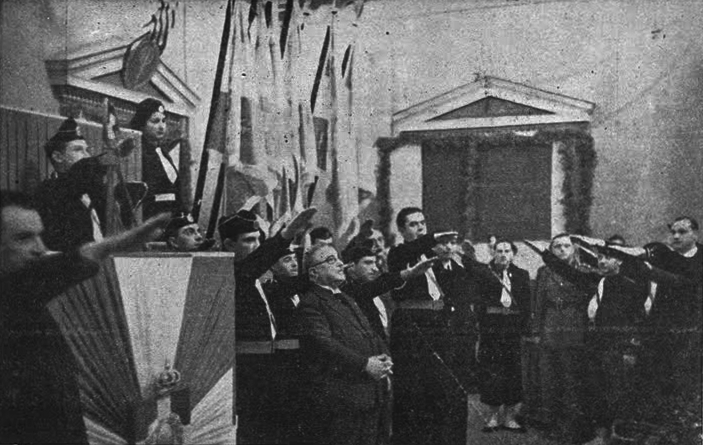
The conservative regime of Ioannis Metaxas (4th of August Regime) adopted many of the ideas and symbolism of Italian Fascism. Here members of the National Organisation of Youth give the Roman salute to Metaxas.

King George II immediately dismissed Kondylis and appointed professor Konstantinos Demertzis as interim prime minister. Venizelos meanwhile, in exile, urged an end to the conflict over the monarchy in view of the threat to Greece from the rise of Fascist Italy. His successors as Liberal leader, Themistoklis Sophoulis and Georgios Papandreou, agreed, and the restoration of the monarchy was accepted. The Greek elections of 1936 resulted in a hung parliament, with the Communists holding the balance. As no government could be formed, Demertzis continued on. At the same time, a series of deaths left the Greek political scene in disarray: Kondylis died in February, Venizelos in March, Demertzis in April and Tsaldaris in May. The road was now clear for Ioannis Metaxas, who had succeeded Demertzis as interim prime minister.

Metaxas, a retired royalist general, believed that an authoritarian government was necessary to prevent social conflict and quell the rising power of the Communists. On 4 August 1936, with the King's support, he suspended parliament and established the 4th of August Regime. The Communists were suppressed and the Liberal leaders went into internal exile. Patterning itself after Benito Mussolini's Fascist Italy, Metaxas' regime promoted various concepts such as the "Third Hellenic Civilization", the Roman salute, a National Organisation of Youth, and introduced measures to gain popular support, such as the Greek Social Insurance Institute (IKA), still the biggest social security institution in Greece.

Despite these efforts, the regime lacked a broad popular base or a mass movement supporting it. The Greek people were generally apathetic, without actively opposing Metaxas. Metaxas also improved the country's defenses in preparation for the forthcoming European war, constructing, among other defensive measures, the "Metaxas Line". Despite his aping of Fascism, and the strong economic ties with resurgent Nazi Germany, Metaxas followed a policy of neutrality, given Greece's traditionally strong ties to Britain, reinforced by King George II's personal anglophilia. In April 1939, the Italian threat suddenly loomed closer when Italy annexed Albania, whereupon Britain publicly guaranteed Greece's borders. Thus, when World War II broke out in September 1939, Greece remained neutral.

== World War II ==
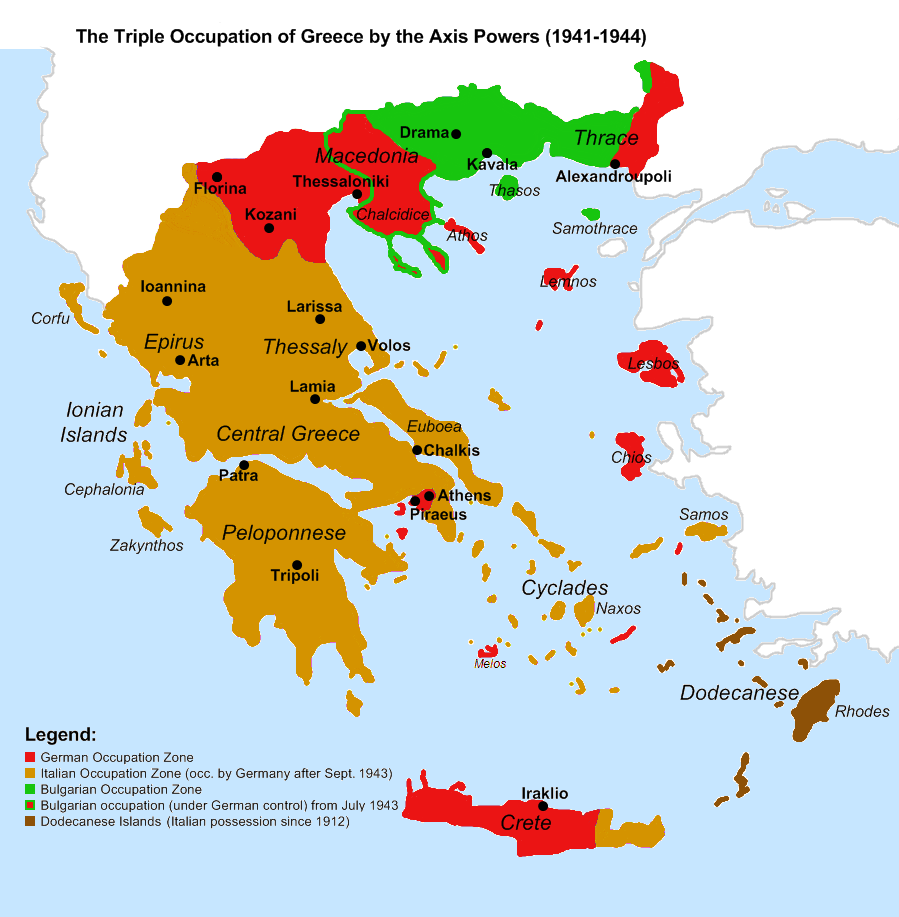
The three occupation zones. The Italian zone was taken over by the Germans in September 1943. Italian German Bulgaria

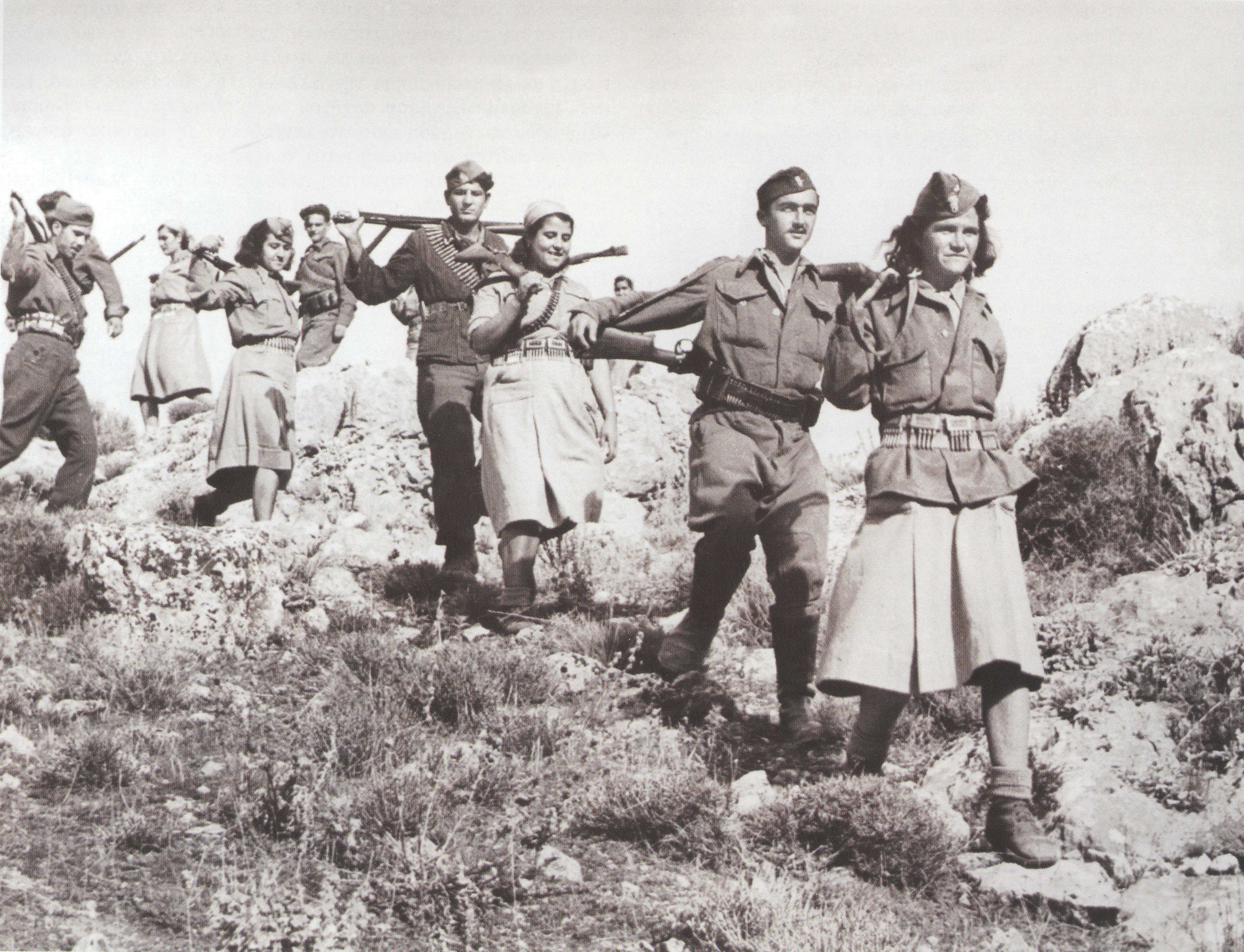
Guerillas of ELAS

Despite this declared neutrality, Greece became a target for Mussolini's expansionist policies. Provocations against Greece included the sinking of the Greek cruiser Elli on 15 August 1940. Italian troops crossed the border on 28 October 1940, beginning the Greco-Italian War, but were stopped by a determined Greek defence that ultimately drove them back into Albania.

Metaxas died suddenly in January 1941. His death raised hopes for a liberalization of his regime and the restoration of parliamentary rule, but King George quashed these hopes when he retained the regime's machinery in place. In the meantime, Adolf Hitler was reluctantly forced to divert German troops to rescue Mussolini from defeat, and attacked Greece through Yugoslavia and Bulgaria on 6 April 1941. Despite British assistance, the Germans overran most of the country by the end of May. The King and the government escaped to Crete, where they stayed until the end of the Battle of Crete. They then transferred to Egypt, where a Greek government in exile was established.

Greece was divided into German, Italian and Bulgarian zones and in Athens, a puppet regime was established. The members were either conservatives or nationalists with fascist leanings. The three quisling prime ministers were Georgios Tsolakoglou, the general who had signed the armistice with the Wehrmacht, Konstantinos Logothetopoulos, and Ioannis Rallis, who took office when the German defeat was inevitable and aimed primarily at combating the left-wing Resistance movement. To this end, he created the collaborationist Security Battalions.

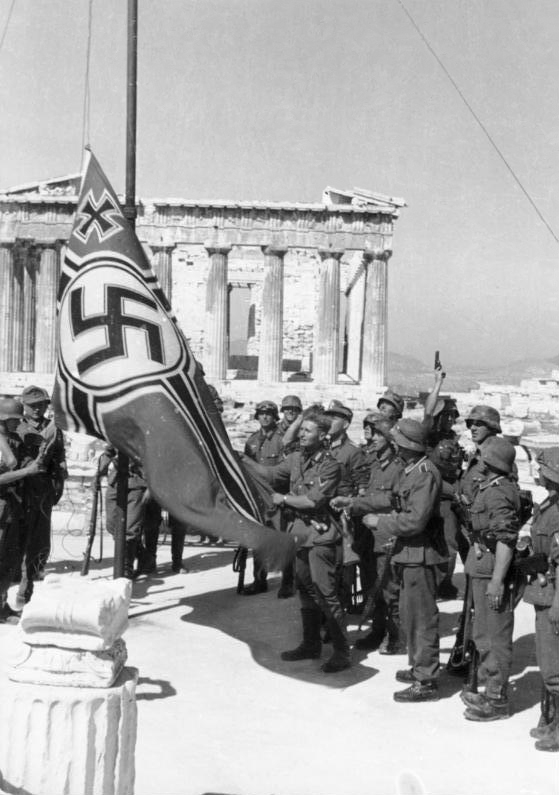
The symbolic start of the Occupation: German soldiers raising the German War Flag over the Acropolis. It would be taken down in one of the first acts of the Greek Resistance.

Greece suffered terrible privations during World War II as the Germans appropriated most of the country's agricultural production and prevented its fishing fleets from operating. As a result, and because a British blockade initially hindered foreign relief efforts, the Great Greek Famine resulted. Hundreds of thousands of Greeks perished, especially in the winter of 1941–1942. The drachma suffered one of the five worst hyperinflations in recorded history. In the mountains of the Greek mainland, in the meantime, several Greek resistance movements sprang up, and by mid-1943, the Axis forces controlled only the main towns and the connecting roads, while a "Free Greece" was set up in the mountains. In September 1943, the Italian occupation zones of Greece were invaded by German forces following Mussolini's deposition and Italy's decision to join Greece as an Allied nation in the war.

The largest resistance group, the National Liberation Front (EAM), was controlled by the Communist Party of Greece, as was the Greek People's Liberation Army (ELAS), led by Aris Velouchiotis, and a civil war soon broke out between it and non-Communist groups such as the National Republican Greek League (EDES) in those areas liberated from the Germans. The exiled government in Cairo was only intermittently in touch with the resistance movement and exercised virtually no influence in the occupied country. Part of this was due to the unpopularity of King George II in Greece itself, but despite efforts by Greek politicians, British support ensured his retention at the head of the Cairo government.

As the German defeat drew nearer, the various Greek political factions convened in Lebanon in May 1944 under British auspices and formed a government of national unity under George Papandreou, in which EAM was represented by six ministers.

== Civil War ==
German forces withdrew on 12 October 1944, and the government in exile returned to Athens. After the German withdrawal, the EAM-ELAS guerrilla army effectively controlled most of Greece, but its leaders were reluctant to take control of the country, as they knew that Soviet premier Joseph Stalin had agreed that Greece would be in the British sphere of influence after the war. Tensions between the British-backed Papandreou and the EAM, especially over the issue of disarmament of the various armed groups, led to the resignation of the latter's ministers from the government.

A few days later, on 3 December 1944, a large-scale pro-EAM demonstration in Athens ended in violence and ushered an intense, house-to-house struggle with British and monarchist forces (the Dekemvriana). After three weeks, the Communists were defeated: the Varkiza agreement ended the conflict and disarmed ELAS, and an unstable coalition government was formed. The anti-EAM backlash grew into a full-scale "White Terror", which exacerbated tensions.

Organization and military bases of the "Democratic Army", as well as entry routes to Greece.

The Communists boycotted the March 1946 elections, and on the same day, fighting broke out again. By the end of 1946, the Communist Democratic Army of Greece had been formed, pitted against the governmental National Army, which was backed first by Britain and after 1947 by the United States.

Communist successes in 1947–1948 enabled them to move freely over much of mainland Greece, but with extensive reorganization, the deportation of rural populations and American material support, the National Army was slowly able to regain control over most of the countryside. In 1949, the insurgents suffered a major blow, as Yugoslavia closed its borders following the split between Marshal Josip Broz Tito with the Soviet Union. Finally, in August 1949, the National Army under Marshal Alexander Papagos launched an offensive that forced the remaining insurgents to surrender or flee across the northern border into the territory of Greece's northern Communist neighbors.

The civil war resulted in 100,000 killed and caused catastrophic economic disruption. In addition, at least 25,000 Greeks and an unspecified number of Macedonian Slavs were either voluntarily or forcibly evacuated to Eastern bloc countries, while 700,000 became displaced persons inside the country. Many more emigrated to Australia and other countries.

The postwar settlement ended Greece's territorial expansion, which had begun in 1832. The 1947 Treaty of Paris required Italy to hand over the Dodecanese islands to Greece. These were the last majority-Greek-speaking areas to be united with the Greek state, apart from Cyprus which was a British possession until it became independent in 1960. Greece's ethnic homogeneity was increased by the postwar expulsion of 25,000 Albanians from Epirus (see Cham Albanians). The only significant remaining minorities are the Muslims in Western Thrace (about 100,000) and a small Slavic-speaking minority in the north. Greek nationalists continued to claim southern Albania (which they called Northern Epirus), home of a significant Greek population (about 3%-12% in the whole of Albania), and the Turkish-held islands of Imvros and Tenedos, where there were smaller Greek minorities.

== Postwar Greece (1950–1973) ==
After the civil war, Greece sought to join the Western democracies and became a member of the North Atlantic Treaty Organization in 1952.

Since the Civil war (1946–49) but even more after that, the parties in the parliament were divided in three political concentrations. The political formation Right-Centre-Left, given the exacerbation of political animosity that had preceded dividing the country in the 40s, tended to turn the concurrence of parties into ideological positions.

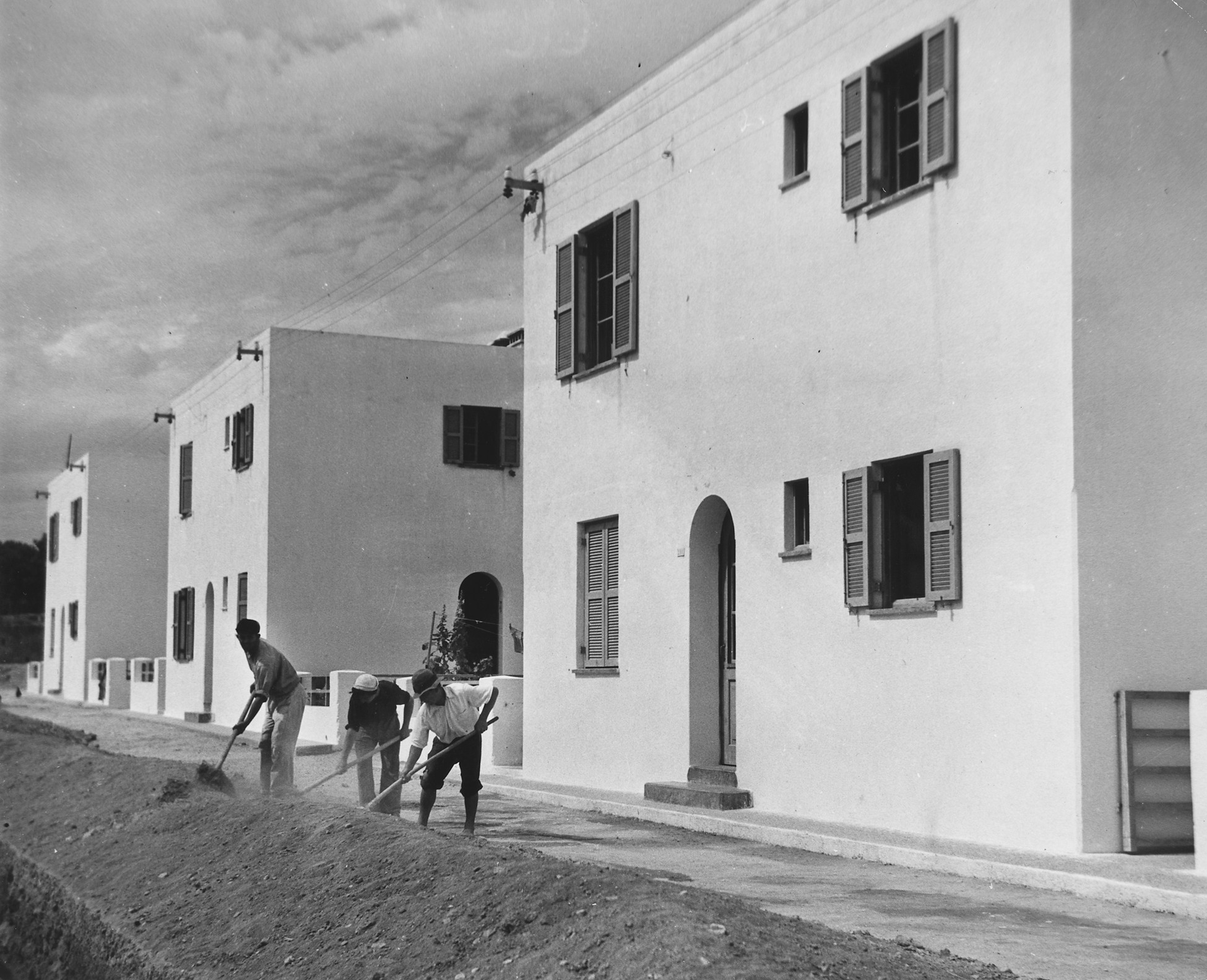
Workmen grade the street in front of new housing constructed with the help of Marshall Plan funds in Greece.

In the beginning of the 1950s, the forces of the centre (EPEK) succeeded in gaining the power and under the leadership of the aged general N. Plastiras they governed for about half a four-year term. These were a series of governments having limited maneuverability and inadequate influence in the political arena. This government, as well as those that followed, was constantly under the American auspices. The defeat of EPEK in the elections of 1952, apart from increasing the repressive measures that concerned the defeated of the Civil war, also marked the end of the general political position that it represented, namely political consensus and social reconciliation.

The Left, which had been ostracized from the political life of the country, found a way of expression through the constitution of EDA (United Democratic Left) in 1951, which turned out to be a significant pole, yet steadily excluded from the decision making centres. After the disbandment of the centre as an autonomous political institution, EDA practically expanded its electoral influence to a significant part of the EAM-based Centre-Left.

The 1960s are part of the period 1953–72, during which Greek economy developed rapidly and was structured within the scope of European and worldwide economic developments. One of the main characteristics of that period was the major political event of the country's accession in the European Economic Community, in an attempt to create a common market. The relevant treaty was contracted in 1962.

The developmental strategy adopted by the country was embodied in centrally organized five-year plans; yet their orientation was indistinct. The average annual emigration, which absorbed the excess workforce and contributed to extremely high growth rates, exceeded the annual natural increase in population. The influx of large amounts of foreign private capital was being facilitated and consumption was expanded. These, associated with the rise of tourism, the expansion of shipping activity and with the migrant remittances, had a positive effect on the country's balance of payments.

The peak of development was registered principally in manufacturing, mainly in the textile, chemical and metallurgical industries, the growth rate of which reached 11% during 1965–70. The other large area where obvious economic and social consequences occurred was that of construction. The policy of αντιπαροχή (antiparochi, "property-swap"), a Greek invention which entailed the concession of construction land to developers in return for a share in the resulting multi-storey apartment buildings, favoured the creation of a class of small-medium contractors on the one hand and settled the housing system and property status on the other. However, it was also responsible for the demolition of much of the country's traditional and 19th-century neoclassical architecture, and the transformation of Greek cities, and especially Athens, into a "form-less, border-less and placeless urban landscape".

During that decade, youth culture came to the fore in society as a distinct social power with autonomous presence (creation of a new culture in music, fashion etc.) and young people displayed dynamism in the assertion of their social rights. The independence granted to Cyprus, which was mined from the very beginning, constituted the main focus of young activist mobilizations, along with struggles aiming at reforms in education, which were provisionally realized to a certain extent through the educational reform of 1964. The country reckoned on and was influenced by Europe—usually behind time—and by the current trends like never before.

=== Greek military junta of 1967–1974 ===
The country descended into a prolonged political crisis, and elections were scheduled for late April 1967. On 21 April 1967 a group of right-wing colonels led by Colonel George Papadopoulos seized power in a coup d'état establishing the Regime of the Colonels. Civil liberties were suppressed, special military courts were established, and political parties were dissolved.

Several thousand suspected communists and political opponents were imprisoned or exiled to remote Greek islands. Alleged US support for the junta is claimed to be the cause of rising anti-americanism in Greece during and following the junta's harsh rule. The junta's early years also saw a marked upturn in the economy, with increased foreign investment and large-scale infrastructure works. The junta was widely condemned abroad, but inside the country, discontent began to increase only after 1970, when the economy slowed down.

Even the armed forces, the regime's foundation, were not immune: In May 1973, a planned coup by the Hellenic Navy was narrowly suppressed, but led to the mutiny of the Velos, whose officers sought political asylum in Italy. In response, junta leader Papadopoulos attempted to steer the regime towards a controlled democratization, abolishing the monarchy and declaring himself President of the Republic.

== Transition and democracy (1973–2009) ==
On 25 November 1973, following the bloody suppression of the Athens Polytechnic uprising on 17 November, the hardliner Brigadier Dimitrios Ioannides overthrew Papadopoulos and tried to continue the dictatorship despite the popular unrest the uprising had triggered. Ioannides' attempt in July 1974 to overthrow Archbishop Makarios, the President of Cyprus, brought Greece to the brink of war with Turkey, which invaded Cyprus and occupied part of the island.

Senior Greek military officers then withdrew their support from the junta, which collapsed. Constantine Karamanlis returned from exile in France to establish a government of national unity until elections could be held. Karamanlis worked to defuse the risk of war with Turkey and also legalised the Communist Party, which had been illegal since 1947. His newly organized party, New Democracy (ND), won the elections held in November 1974 by a wide margin, and he became prime minister.

Following the 1974 referendum which resulted in the abolition of the monarchy, a new constitution was approved by parliament on 19 June 1975. Parliament elected Constantine Tsatsos as President of the Republic. In the parliamentary elections of 1977, New Democracy again won a majority of seats. In May 1980, Prime Minister Karamanlis was elected to succeed Tsatsos as president. George Rallis succeeded Karamanlis as prime minister.

On 1 January 1981, Greece became the tenth member of the European Community (now the European Union). In parliamentary elections held on 18 October 1981, Greece elected its first socialist government when the Panhellenic Socialist Movement (PASOK), led by Andreas Papandreou, won 172 of 300 seats. On 29 March 1985, after Prime Minister Papandreou declined to support President Karamanlis for a second term, triggering a constitutional crisis, Supreme Court Justice Christos Sartzetakis was elected president by the Greek parliament.

Greece had two rounds of parliamentary elections in 1989. The first coalition was between conservatives and communists to form a government with a limited mandate; the investigation for the numerous corruption scandals, such as the Koskotas scandal and Yugoslav corn scandal, that was rocking Papandreou's government. This coalition was extraordinary for Greek society and was the first step in healing the wounds of the Greek Civil War but both sought to form a government with a limited mandate to carry out the investigations into PASOK's corruption scandals that became known as "catharsis." After the indictment of Papandreou and new elections, a National Unity government under Xenophon Zolotas was formed to reverse the economy's deterioration. Party leaders withdrew their support in February 1990, and elections were held on 8 April. New Democracy, led by Constantine Mitsotakis, won 150 seats in that election and subsequently gained two others. Mitsotakis implemented austerity measures that were needed for the Greek economy to converge to the Euro convergence criteria, causing frustration to Greeks. However, his governance was short due to a split between Mitsotakis and his first foreign minister, Antonis Samaras, in 1992, due to the Macedonia naming dispute that led to Samaras' dismissal and the eventual collapse of the ND government. In new elections in September 1993, Papandreou returned to power.

On 17 January 1996, following a protracted illness, Papandreou resigned and was replaced as prime minister by the former Minister of Trade and Industry Costas Simitis. Within days, the new prime minister had to handle a major Greek-Turkish crisis over the Imia/Kardak islands. Simitis subsequently won re-election in the 1996 and 2000 elections. After two decades of the exuberant rhetoric of Simitis' predecessors and financial stagnation, the Greek economy was put in order and became one of the fastest-growing economies in Europe, with an average annual increase of 4.1% of gross domestic product (GDP). The performance of the Greek economy under Simitis sealed the Greek entry into the Euro currency, closing the journey of aligning Greece with the West, which started with Eleftherios Venizelos and continued with Constantine Karamanlis. Simitis also succeeded in the Cypriot accession into the EU, a diplomatic priority for Greece. In 2004, Simitis retired, and George Papandreou succeeded him as PASOK leader.

In the March 2004 elections, PASOK was defeated by New Democracy, led by Kostas Karamanlis, the nephew of the former president. The government called early elections in September 2007 (normally, elections would have been held in March 2008), and New Democracy again was the majority party in the Parliament. As a result of that defeat, PASOK undertook a party election for a new leader. In that contest, George Papandreou was reelected as the head of the socialist party in Greece. In the 2009 elections however, PASOK became the majority party in the Parliament and George Papandreou became Prime Minister of Greece. After PASOK lost its majority in the Parliament, ND and PASOK joined the smaller Popular Orthodox Rally in a grand coalition, pledging their parliamentary support for a government of national unity headed by former European Central Bank vice-president Lucas Papademos.

== Greek Government and Economic Crisis (2009–) ==
=== Government-Debt Crisis (2009–2018) ===
From late 2009, fears of a sovereign debt crisis developed among investors concerning Greece's ability to meet its debt obligations due to strong increase in government debt levels. This led to a crisis of confidence, indicated by a widening of bond yield spreads and risk insurance on credit default swaps compared to other countries, most importantly Germany. Downgrading of Greek government debt to junk bonds created alarm in financial markets.

On 2 May 2010, the Eurozone countries and the International Monetary Fund agreed on a €110 billion loan for Greece, conditional on the implementation of harsh austerity measures. In October 2011, Eurozone leaders also agreed on a proposal to write off 50% of Greek debt owed to private creditors, increasing the EFSF to about €1 trillion and requiring European banks to achieve 9% capitalisation to reduce the risk of contagion to other countries. These austerity measures proved to be extremely unpopular with the public in Greece, precipitating demonstrations and civil unrest.

There were widespread fears that a Greek default on its debt would have global repercussions, endangering the economies of many other countries in the European Union, threatening the stability of the European currency, the euro, and possibly plunging the world into another recession. It was also speculated that the crisis could have forced Greece to abandon the euro and return to the drachma. In April 2014, Greece returned to the global bond market as it successfully sold €3 billion worth of five-year government bonds at a yield of 4.95%. According to the IMF, Greece will have real GDP growth of 0.6% in 2014 after five years of decline.

=== Coalition government ===
Following the May 2012 legislative election where the New Democracy party became the largest party in the Hellenic Parliament, Samaras, leader of ND, was asked by Greek President Karolos Papoulias to try to form a government. However, after a day of hard negotiations with the other parties in Parliament, Samaras officially announced he was giving up the mandate to form a government. The task passed to Alexis Tsipras, leader of the SYRIZA (the second-largest party) who was also unable to form a government. After PASOK also failed to negotiate a successful agreement to form a government, emergency talks with the President ended with a new election being called while Panagiotis Pikrammenos was appointed as prime minister in a caretaker government.

Voters once again took to the polls in the widely watched June 2012 election. New Democracy came out on top in a stronger position with 129 seats, compared to 108 in the May election. On 20 June 2012, Samaras successfully formed a coalition with PASOK (now led by former finance minister Evangelos Venizelos) and DIMAR. The new government would have a majority of 58, with SYRIZA, Independent Greeks (ANEL), Golden Dawn (XA) and the Communist Party (KKE) comprising the opposition. PASOK and DIMAR chose to take a limited role in Samaras' Cabinet, being represented by party officials and independent technocrats instead of MPs.

=== SYRIZA victory ===
In wake of the austerity measures adopted by the Samaras government, Greeks voted the anti-austerity, left-wing SYRIZA into office in the January 2015 legislative election. Samaras accepted defeat and said that his party had done much to restore the country's finances.

SYRIZA government lost its majority in August 2015, when some of its MPs withdrew their support in favor of the governing coalition. SYRIZA won the September elections, but failed to get an outright majority. Later they formed a coalition with Independent Greeks, a right-wing party.

The party suffered heavy defeats at the 2019 European Parliament election, and prime minister and SYRIZA leader, Alexis Tsipras resigned to organize a snap election. It resulted in a majority for New Democracy, and the appointment of Kyriakos Mitsotakis as prime minister.

=== New Democracy back in power (2019–) ===
On 7 July 2019, Kyriakos Mitsotakis was sworn in as the new prime minister of Greece. He formed a centre-right government after the landslide election victory of his New Democracy party.

In March 2020, Greece's parliament elected a non-partisan candidate, Katerina Sakellaropoulou, as the first female President of Greece.

In June 2023, conservative New Democracy party won the legislative election, meaning another four-year term as prime minister for Kyriakos Mitsotakis. On 13 March 2025, Konstantinos Tasoulas was sworn in as Greece's new president.

== See also ==
- Timeline of Greek history
- Timeline of modern Greek history
- Economic history of Greece and the Greek world
- Investiture of Greek Sovereigns

== Sources ==
- Close, David H. (2014). Greece since 1945: Politics, Economy and Society. London & New York: Taylor & Francis. ISBN 978-1-317-88001-1.
- Clogg, Richard (2013). A Concise History of Greece. Cambridge: Cambridge University Press. ISBN 978-1-107-65644-4.
- Gallant, Thomas W. (2015). The Edinburgh History of the Greeks, 1768 to 1913.
- Koliopoulos, John S.; Veremis, Thanos M. (2009). Modern Greece: A History since 1821.
