= Mike Panopoulos =

Greek Australian footballer

Personal information
- Full name: Michael Panopoulos
- Date of birth: 9 October 1976 (age 50)
- Place of birth: Melbourne, Australia
- Positions: Central midfielder; right winger

Youth career
- Heidelberg United

Senior career*
Years	Team	Apps	(Gls)
1993–1994	Heidelberg United	8	(0)
1995–1999	Aris	62	(8)
1999	→ Dundee United (loan)	0	(0)
1999–2002	Portsmouth	54	(6)
2001–2002	→ Dunfermline Athletic (loan)	9	(0)
2002–2003	Aris	4	(0)
2003–2004	South Melbourne	22	(1)
2004–2005	AO Kerkyra	4	(0)
2007	Oakleigh Cannons	22	(0)

International career^{‡}
1996–1999	Greece under-21		
- * Club domestic league appearances and goals as of 22:34, 6 May 2009 (UTC) ‡ National team caps and goals as of 22:34, 6 May 2009 (UTC)

Michael Panopoulos (Greek: Μιχάλης Πανόπουλος; born 9 October 1976), also written Michalis Panopoulos, is a Greek Australian association football player. He has currently retired from playing, but now coaches the Altona City U12/U13 boys team and also the state of Victoria.

Panopoulos' parents come from the Greek Macedonian village of Kratero in Florina, Greece. He began his career as a youth player with Heidelberg United in Australia, though in 1993 he was offered a professional contract with Aris in the Super League Greece. Whilst at the Greek club Panopoulos played in the UEFA Cup and was a losing finalist in the Greek Football Cup.

Strong performances by Panopoulos for the Greek club led to a £750,000 transfer to Portsmouth F.C. in August 1999. Panopoulos spent three years at Portsmouth, but left the club the year before Portsmouth's promotion to the FA Premier League.

In December 2001 Panopoulos moved on loan from Portsmouth to Dunfermline F.C. in the Scottish Premier League. After leaving Portsmouth he transferred to South Melbourne FC and then made a return to Greece with Kerkyra That was followed by a move back to Australia, with Oakleigh Cannons of the Victorian Premier League.

Panopoulos played for the Greece under-21 national team.
