= Pavlos Rakovitis =

Greek fighter in the Macedonian struggle

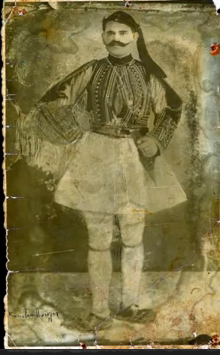
- Rakovitis wearing the Greek foustanella
- Native name: Παύλος Ρακοβίτης
- Nickname: Kapetan Rakovitis (Καπετάν Ρακοβίτης)
- Born: Pavlos Nikolaidis (Παύλος Ηλία Νικολαΐδης) c. 1877; Rakovo, Monastir Vilayet, Ottoman Empire (now Kratero, Greece)
- Died: 4 October 1910 (aged 32–33) Rakovo, Monastir Vilayet, Ottoman Empire (now Kratero, Greece)
- Buried: Kratero, Greece (hidden grave)
- Allegiance: Kingdom of Greece
- Branch: HMC
- Service years: 1905–1910
- Conflicts: Macedonian Struggle

Pavlos Nikolaidis (Greek: Παύλος Νικολαΐδης), known by his nom de guerre Rakovitis (Παύλος Ρακοβίτης, "Pavlos of Rakovo") was a member of the Hellenic Macedonian Committee, a revolutionary chieftain of a band of 40 guerrillas that fought in the Macedonian Struggle against the Bulgarians.

== Life ==
Born in Rakovo, near Florina, Manastir Vilayet, Ottoman Empire (modern-day Kratero, Florina, Greece) around 1877. He was a Greek Macedonian. In 1900, he moved to the United States on seasonal work. While away, his village was burnt down by the Ottomans in 1903, upon which he began training in guerrilla tactics. He joined the Hellenic Macedonian Committee which supported the Patriarchate of Constantinople and the Greek cause in 1905, and entered the detachment of Efthymios Kaoudis. His village had in the meantime suffered threats and assassinations by the IMRO which targeted Patriarchist villages in order to force them to support the Bulgarian Exarchate.

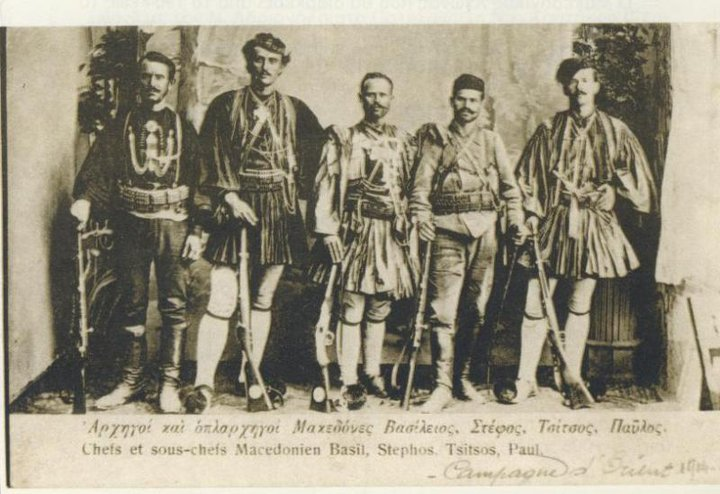
Pavlos Rakovitis (second from right) and other Greek Macedonian chieftains from Monastir, Mariovo and Rakovo

Rakovitis led a band of 40 men, which was active in the territories of Florina and the Baba mountain. It fought both Ottomans and Bulgarians. In 1907, Bulgarian bands entered his village and brutally destroyed it once again, killing his father in the process. Rakovitis was furious with the actions of the Bulgarians, especially since his own father was burnt to death in the family home.

== Death ==
On 4 October 1910, Rakovitis was killed while he slept hidden in a barn by a former ally and fellow fighter named Mihail, who was bribed by the Young Turks to assassinate him. The bribed murderer had fled to Monastir but was quickly found and executed before the news got out that Rakovitis was killed. Pavlos Rakovitis was buried at a hidden location near the village so there wouldn't be proof of his death and prevent enemies from boldly taking control of the area.

== Legacy ==
In 1960, a bust of Pavlos Rakovitis was erected in his birthplace of Kratero.

In 1999, the "Pavlos Rakovitis" nature education and landscaping association was founded in Kratero.

Rakovitis is considered a folk hero, particularly by people from the region of Florina. The Society Of Kratero Melbourne, Australia and The Benevolent Association of Kratero in Toronto, Canada both use depictions of Rakovitis as their official logo.
