= Lazaros Varzis =

Greek chieftain of the Macedonian Struggle

Kapetan (Chieftain) Lazaros Varzis
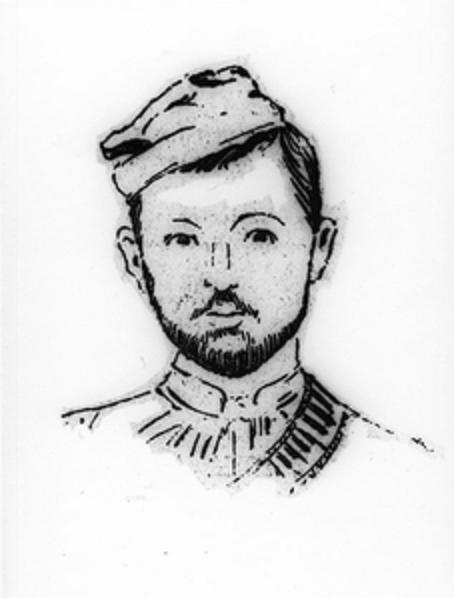
- A drawing of Lazaros Varzis.
- Native name: Λάζαρος Βαρζής
- Nickname(s): Lazos (Λάζος); Kapetan Zarkadas (Καπετάν Ζαρκάδας)
- Born: c. 1850s Kontziko, Monastir Vilayet, Ottoman Empire (now Galatini, Greece)
- Allegiance: Kingdom of Greece
- Service / branch: HMC
- Battles / wars: 1878 Macedonian rebellion 1896–1897 Macedonian rebellion Macedonian Struggle

Lazaros Varzis (Greek: Λάζαρος Βαρζής) was a Greek chieftain of the Macedonian Struggle.

== Biography ==
He was born in the mid 19th century in Kontziko (now Galatini) of Kozani. He participated in the 1878 Greek Macedonian rebellion and in the 1896–1897 Greek Macedonian rebellion, initially as a soldier and later as a co-leader of a small armed group, in the group of Athanasios Broufas. During the Macedonian Struggle, he was a chieftain and acted mainly in the area of Almopia, from June 1906 to March 1908 against the Bulgarian komitadjis and the Ottoman authorities, often collaborating with the officer Athanasios Exadaktylos. He came in contact with Traianos Bragiannis to facilitate his passage to Greece.

== Sources & References ==
- John S. Koliopoulos (editor), Αφανείς, γηγενείς Μακεδονομάχοι, Εταιρεία Μακεδονικών Σπουδών, University Studio Press, Thessaloniki, 2008, p. 103
- Αρχείο Διεύθυνσης Εφέδρων Πολεμιστών Αγωνιστών Θυμάτων Αναπήρων (ΔΕΠΑΘΑ), Αρχείο Μακεδονικού Αγώνα, φ. Β-164
