= 1896–1897 Macedonian rebellion =

1896–1897 Greek Macedonian Rebellion
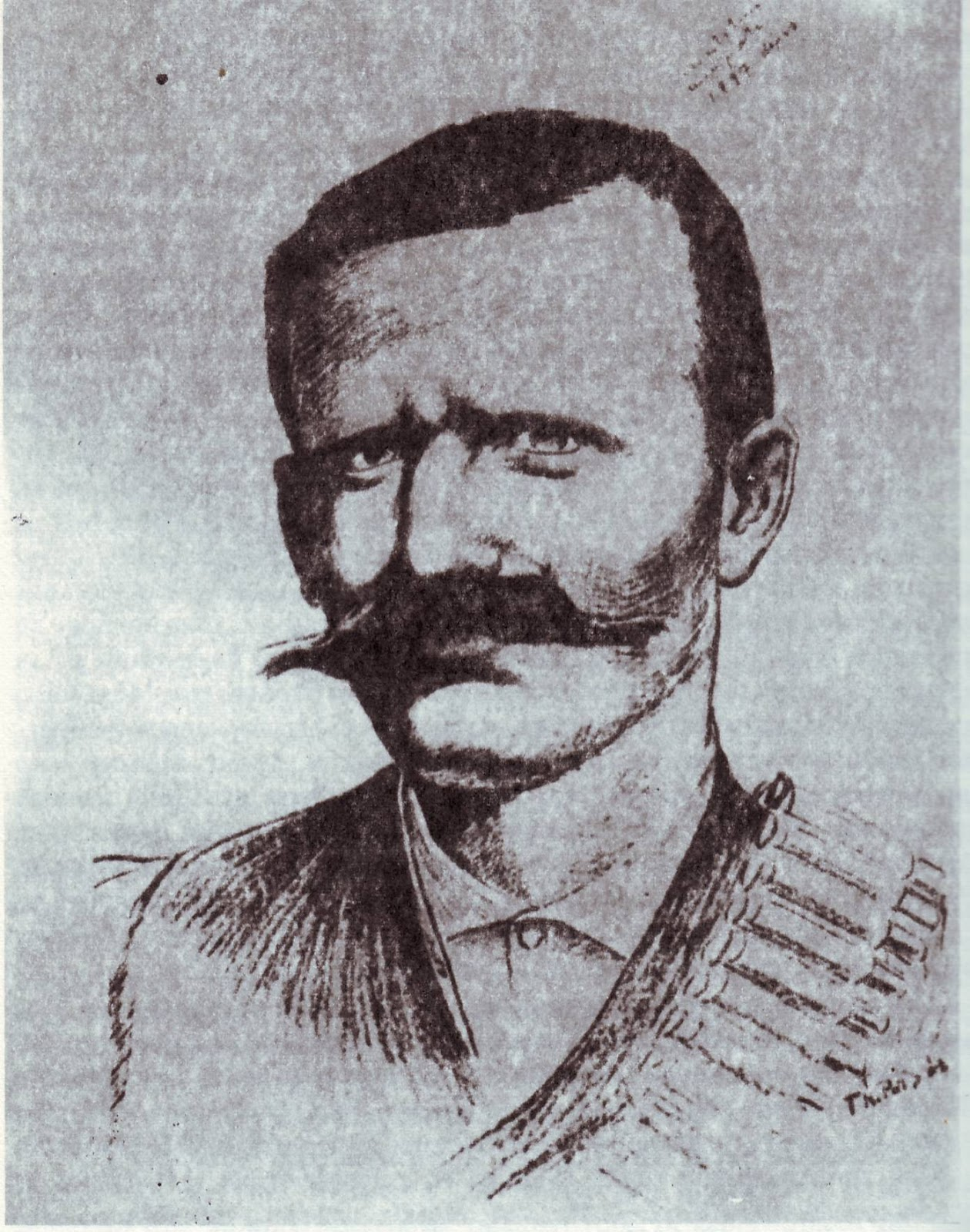
- Athanasios Broufas, a leader of the rebellion
| Date | July 1896 – 20 May 1897 |
| Location | Ottoman Macedonia: Salonika Vilayet; Monastir Vilayet |
| Result | Ottoman victory |

Belligerents
| (Kingdom of Greece) Greek Revolutionaries Supported By: (Kingdom of Greece) Greece | Ottoman Empire |

Commanders and leaders
| Athanasios Broufas; Dimitrios Natsios | Ahmet Resber |

The 1896–1897 Macedonian Rebellion (Greek: Μακεδονική επανάσταση του 1896–1897) was a Greek rebellion, launched in 1896, and a guerrilla movement that took place in Macedonia in order to preserve the conscience and ready-mindedness of the Macedonian Greek populations, to create a rivalrous awe against the Bulgarians the demarcation of the Greek territorial claims in the Ottoman area and the creation of a distraction for the events of Crete. The movement was of Macedonian character, as the regiments invading Macedonia from Thessaly consisted primarily of Macedonian chieftains and fighters, most of whom were from Northwestern Macedonia. The initial impetus was given by the Ethniki Etaireia (Greek National Company), but then several Macedonian chieftains spontaneously and without coordination were involved in the events, while in some regions of Macedonia the events took the form of massive uprisings. The main rebels of the Macedonian Revolution of 1896 were the areas of Sanjak of Monastir (Florina, Bitola, Prespes), Sanjak of Korytsa (Kastoria), Sanjak of Servia (Grevena, Kozani), Sanjak of Salonica (Thessaloniki, Pieria, Imathia, Pella, Tikveš) and Sanjak of Serres (Serres, Upper Nevrokopi, Lower Nevrokopi).

== Background ==
Already in the Macedonian revolution of 1878 around 1,000 Revolutionary veterans were in Thessaly, while other 2,000 to 2,500 thousand Macedonian Greeks who had been expelled because of the degraded situation in their homelands were counted. On top of that, many leaders of the Macedonian Revolution of 1878 had remained in Macedonia and continued the guerrilla action. They used to let go in the winter and from the spring they were destroying mainly Ottoman targets. The Ethniki Etaireia (Greek National Company) invited the chieftains who were in the free Greece to organize and coordinate their action. The chiefs who participated were Zermas, Makris, Alamanos, Naoum Konstantinidis, Vlachavas, Athanasios Broufas, Takis Natsios (Periphanos) from Megarovo, Pelagonia, Panagiotis Ververas and Christos Ververas. At the same time, without agreement, Nikolaos Tsapanos from Pelagonia, who lived in Thessaly, bought 500 weapons for the rebels. Chief of the revolutionary forces was proclaimed Athanasios Broufas. A total of 400 rebels came from Thessaly to Macedonia, whose vast majority were from Northwestern Macedonia. Also participated, Epirotes, heard the Thessalians and the Stereohelladites and, to a lesser extent, the Cretans, the Greeks of Russia and the Eastern Rumelians.

The first infantry under Athanasios Broufas, 90 men, with Demetrios Kannavos, Takis Natsios (Periphanos), Ioannis Georgantas, Ioannis Tsamis from Pisoderi, Vassilios Economou and Lazaros Varzis disembarked in early July 1896 in Skala Eleftherohoriou and afterwards victorious battles with the Ottomans in Vermio Mountains split into two groups. The one with Takis Natsios (Periphanos), Ioannis Tsamis and Lazaros Varzis was headed to Florina, while the second with Athanasios Broufas, Ioannis Georgantas and Vassilios Economou was headed to Veria, Naousa, Ostrovo, Morichovo and Kafantari. The Broufas' infantry split into smaller and moved to Eordaia and Kozani where he gave several battles with Ottoman military regiments. Also, great battles were given in Vladovo and Pozar, Pella. At the end of July 1896, Athanasios Broufas and his men gave a long battle against the Ottomans at the Axios Gates at Tikves. There, Demetrios Kannavos lost his life. The Natsios (Periphanos)' infantry from Peristeri where he was headed was headed on 15 August at the Monastery of Panagia Slimnitsa, in Louboino of Pelagonia, where he met with the chieftains Lazaros Varzis (Zarkadas), Makris, Ioannis Tsamis, Katarachias, Mitsos and Davelis. There they co-authored a revolutionary declaration to the people of Macedonia, the Ottoman authorities and the European consuls explaining the causes of the revolution and its purposes. They were then separated and acted separately in Kastoria, Nestorio, Florina and Eordaia.

The declaration was mentioning among others: "We, being Greek, want Macedonia Greek, and for this we fight".

Initially, the military commander of Manastir Vilayet underestimated the revolution and assured the Vali (governor) Abdul Kerim that he was in control of the situation and that he would fight the rebels. However, the acceptance of the movement by the local Greek population was great; many Greeks from Ohrid and Morichovo were trying to join the guerrillas. Twenty-one fighters were recruited in Boufi. This situation alienated Avdul Kerim Pasha and took action himself. Ottoman reprisals took place in Trebeno, Eordaia, where a furious mob murdered Emmanuel Tsiotsias and Nikolaos Georgiou. In Kozani, the mob caused great disasters in Greek properties and threatened with a general massacre of the Greeks. In the Sarakinoi of Pella, the Ottomans burned many homes, tortured the inhabitants, raped the women, and hung the priest of the village. Finally, it was decided to create a special troop of 800 men who would chase the rebels.

== Evolution of the revolution until 1897 ==
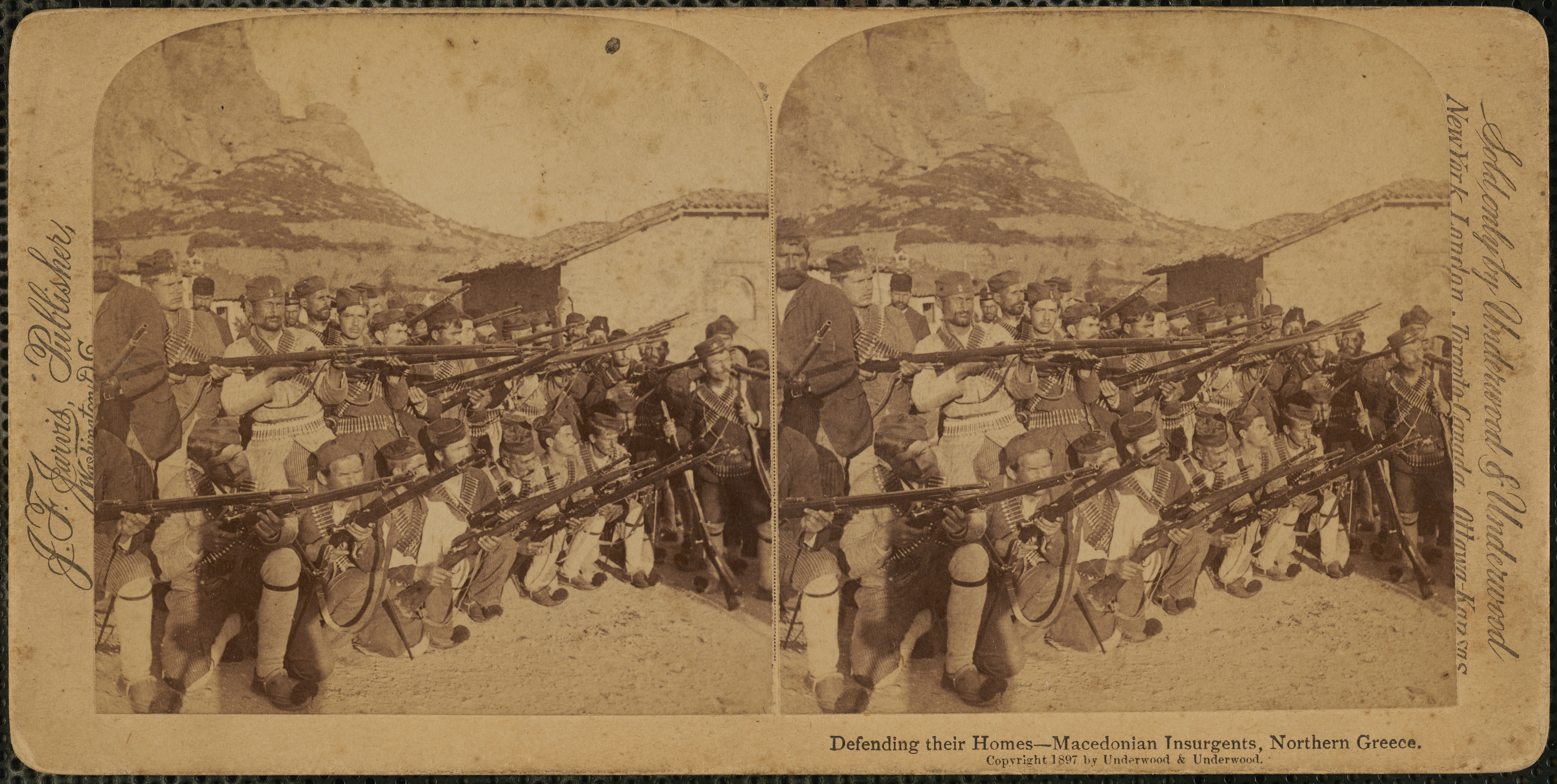
Macedonian insurgents, 1897

Then other infantries entered Macedonia and acted in Morichovo, Almopia and Nevrokopi (Upper and Lower). The revolution lasted until the autumn of 1896 in the areas of Grevena and Kozani, when it was decided to withdraw for the winter due to the lack of munitions and the fear of the Ottoman reprisals in the villages that participated. In the spring of 1897, some chieftains who remained in Macedonia continued their action but the unfortunate outcome for the Greek side, of the Greco-Turkish War finally ended the revolution.

== Legacy ==
Song for chieftain Athanasios Broufas
Cuckoos in mountains and partridges in slopes are saying it,
rock thrush also says it in guerrilla hideouts.
Guerrillas scattered, they made battalions
Broufas in Mariovo, Zarkadas in Kailaria
and Takis Periphanos high in Peristeri.
And once again they were gathered in Panagia Limnitsa
and from there, they send commands and they frighten the Turkish:
"Turkish, stay quiet! We burn your villages.
It's not last year, Bulgarian bastards
But, it's Greek lads, who live in the ravines
and they fight the Turkish, day and night."

— (in Greek) Folk songs of the Macedonian Struggle, Demetrios A. Petropoulos, Thessaloniki 1969

The outburst of the 1896 Revolution in Macedonia was great and had been remembered by the Macedonians for several years, although it was short and without practical results. However, the presence and claims of the Hellenism of the region that remained alive was what really gained from this revolutionary movement and created a revolutionary tradition with a host of chieftains and rebels who could rebel at any time. It was the yeast that gave the numerous guerrillas during the period of the Macedonian Struggle. The European diplomatic representatives in the region as well as the Ottoman authorities were impressed by the ethos of the Greek revolutionaries, as they never turned against civilians, did not commit looting and thefts.

The 1896 revolution was engraved in the memory of the Greeks of Macedonia and a number of folk songs survived in the oral tradition.

== See also ==
- Macedonian Struggle
- Macedonian Question
- History of Modern Greece
