= Galatini =

Galatini Γαλατινή
- Community
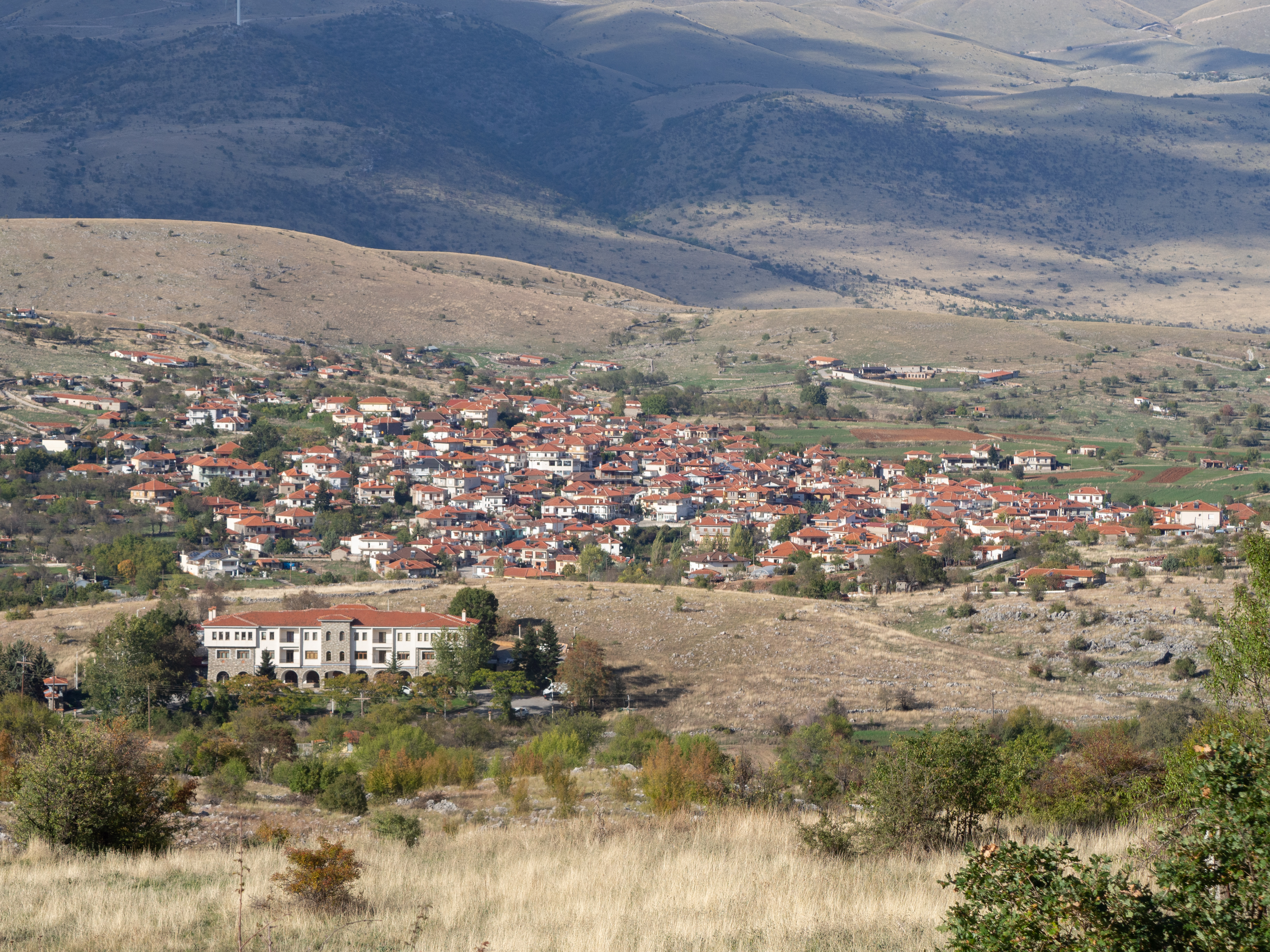
- View of Galatini

- Location within Greece
- Coordinates: 40°19.1′N 21°33.1′E
- Country: Greece
- Administrative region: Western Macedonia
- Regional unit: Kozani
- Municipality: Voio
- Municipal unit: Askio
- Elevation: 1,010 m (3,310 ft)

Population (2021)
  - Community: 1,458
- Time zone: UTC+2 (EET)
  - Summer (DST): UTC+3 (EEST)
- Postal code: 503 00
- Area code: +30-2465
- Vehicle registration: ΚΖ

Galatini (Greek: Γαλατινή, before 1927: Κωντσικόν – Kontsikon), is a village and a community of the Voio municipality. Before the 2011 local government reform it was part of the municipality of Askio, of which it was a municipal district. The 2021 census recorded 1,458 inhabitants in the village.
