= Askio, Kozani =

Askio Άσκιο
- Municipal unit
- Location within the regional unit

- Location within Greece
- Coordinates: 40°18′N 21°30′E
- Country: Greece
- Administrative region: Western Macedonia
- Regional unit: Kozani
- Municipality: Voio

Area
  - Municipal unit: 196.636 km^{2} (75.922 sq mi)
- Elevation: 878 m (2,881 ft)

Population (2021)
  - Municipal unit: 3,070
  - Municipal unit density: 15.6/km^{2} (40.4/sq mi)
- Time zone: UTC+2 (EET)
  - Summer (DST): UTC+3 (EEST)
- Postal code: 503 00
- Area code: +30-2465
- Vehicle registration: KZ

Askio (Greek: Άσκιο) is a former municipality in Kozani regional unit, West Macedonia, Greece. Since the 2011 local government reform it is part of the municipality Voio, of which it is a municipal unit. The municipal unit has an area of 196.636 km^{2}. The 2021 census recorded 3,070 residents in Askio. The seat of the municipality was in Kaloneri. It was named after the Askio mountain range which covers most of the municipal unit.
