= Ano Kleines =

- Community
- Location within Greece
- Coordinates: 40°50′44″N 21°22′56″E
- Country: Greece
- Geographic region: Macedonia
- Administrative region: Western Macedonia
- Regional unit: Florina
- Municipality: Florina
- Municipal unit: Kato Kleines

Population (2021)
  - Community: 155
- Time zone: UTC+2 (EET)
  - Summer (DST): UTC+3 (EEST)

Ano Kleines (Greek: Άνω Κλεινές, before 1926: Άνω Κλέστινα – Ano Klestina) is a village in Florina Regional Unit, Macedonia, Greece.

Muslims of Ano Klestina were Albanian speakers. The 1920 Greek census recorded 911 people in the village, and 896 inhabitants (147 families) were Muslim in 1923. Following the Greek–Turkish population exchange, Greek refugee families in Ano Klestina were from East Thrace (72), Asia Minor (13), Pontus (4) and one other from an unidentified location in 1926. The 1928 Greek census recorded 584 village inhabitants. In 1928, the refugee families numbered 85 (381 people). A Muslim school existed in the village until 1924, later destroyed.

Ano Kleines had 236 inhabitants in 1981. In fieldwork done by anthropologist Riki Van Boeschoten in late 1993, Ano Kleines was populated by a Greek population descended from Anatolian Greek refugees who arrived during the Greek–Turkish population exchange, and Slavophones. The Macedonian language was spoken by people over 60, mainly in private.
