= Thomas Gallant (historian) =

American historian

Thomas W. Gallant is a historian who specializes in modern Greek history and archaeology.

He is holder of the Nicholas Family Endowed Chair in Modern Greek History at the University of California, San Diego. From 2002 to 2007 he held the Hellenic Heritage Foundation Chair of Modern Greek History at York University in Toronto. Before that he was professor of Greek history and anthropology as well as a member of the Center for Greek Studies at the University of Florida.

He is the editor-in-chief of the ten-volume Edinburgh History of the Greeks, the co-director of the UC San Diego Center for Hellenic Studies and a past president of the Modern Greek Studies Association.

== Books ==
- The Edinburgh History of the Greeks, volume 9. The Long Nineteenth Century, 2014
- Πολιτισμός, ταυτότητα και εξουσία στα Επτάνησα, 1817-1864: Βιώματα αποικιακής κυριαρχίας
- Murder on Black Mountain: Love and Death on a Nineteenth Century Greek Island
- Modern Greece, Experiencing Dominion: Culture, Identity and Power in the British Mediterranean
  winner of 2003 MGSD Best Book Prize
- The 1918 Anti-Greek Riot in Toronto
  About the 1918 Toronto anti-Greek riot. The book was presented at the House of Commons, Canada in 2005 and a documentary was shot in 2010 based on the book
- Modern Greece: Society, Politics and Economy, translated into Greek as:
  - Νεωτέρη Ελλάδα. Μια κοινωνική και πολιτική ιστορία
- Outlaws: Bandits, Pirates and the Making of the Modern World
- Athens: A Social History
