= The Edinburgh History of the Greeks =

Book series published by Edinburgh University Press

The Edinburgh History of the Greeks is a book series published by Edinburgh University Press and edited by Thomas Gallant. The series is planned to feature 10 volumes, "covering the history of Greece and the Greeks over the last 3,500 years, from antiquity to the present." It has run from 2011 to the present, with an upcoming volume scheduled for 2021. The series has featured well-known contributors, such as Florin Curta, Nicholas Doumanis, Thomas Gallant, Molly Greene, Antonis Liakos and Joseph Manning. It is notable due to the concise histories and the fresh perspectives the series provides, as well as its innovative combination of political, social and cultural histories.

== Volumes ==
- Florin Curta, The Edinburgh History of the Greeks, c. 500 to 1050: The Early Middle Ages, Edinburgh University Press, Edinburgh, 2011–2014.
- Molly Greene, The Edinburgh History of the Greeks, 1453 to 1768: The Ottoman Empire, Edinburgh University, Edinburgh, 2014–2015.
- Thomas W. Gallant, The Edinburgh History of the Greeks, 1768 to 1913: The Long Nineteenth Century, Edinburgh University, Edinburgh, 2015.
- Nicholas Doumanis & Antonis Liakos, The Edinburgh History of the Greeks, 1909 to 2012: A Transnational History, Edinburgh University, Edinburgh, 2023.
- Joseph G. Manning, The Edinburgh History of the Greeks, 323 to 30 BC: The Hellenistic World, Edinburgh University, Edinburgh, forthcoming.
