= Eratyra =

Eratyra Εράτυρα
- Community
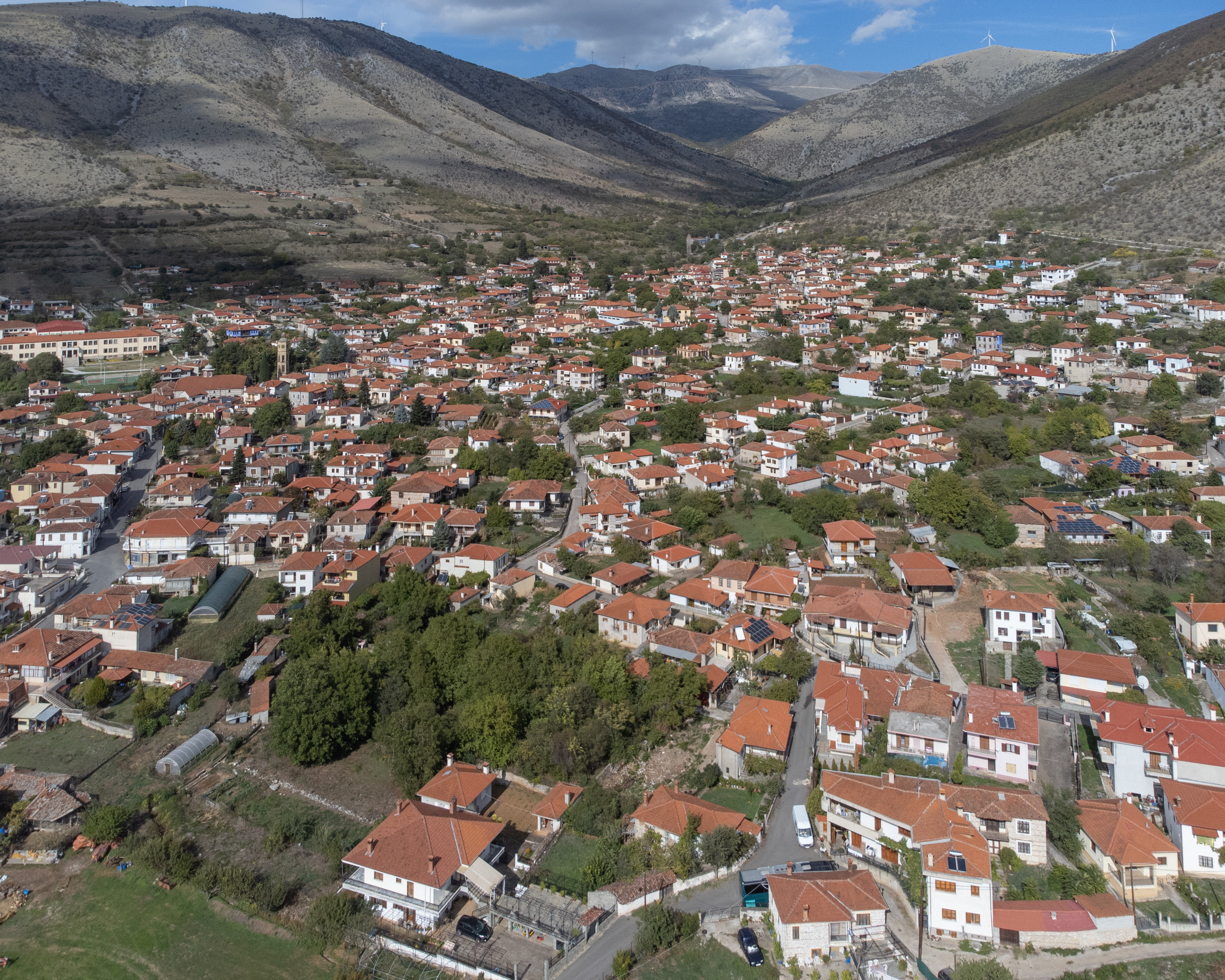
- Aerial view of Eratyra

- Location within Greece
- Coordinates: 40°20.547′N 21°30.8′E
- Country: Greece
- Administrative region: Western Macedonia
- Regional unit: Kozani
- Municipality: Voio
- Municipal unit: Askio

Area
  - Community: 56.381 km^{2} (21.769 sq mi)
- Elevation: 780 m (2,560 ft)

Population (2021)
  - Community: 738
  - Density: 13.1/km^{2} (33.9/sq mi)
- Time zone: UTC+2 (EET)
  - Summer (DST): UTC+3 (EEST)
- Postal code: 50 003
- Area code: +30-2465
- Vehicle registration: ΚΖ

Eratyra (Greek: Εράτυρα, before 1927: Σέλιτσα – Selitsa, between 1927 and 1928: Κατωχώριον – Katochorion), is a village and a community of the Voio municipality. Before the 2011 local government reform it was part of the municipality of Askio, of which it was a municipal district. The 2021 census recorded 738 inhabitants in the village. The community of Eratyra covers an area of 56.381 km^{2}.

The local village name Seltsa was the basis of the toponym Anaselitsa for the Ottoman province and used until the late 1920s. The 1920 Greek census recorded 1,935 people in the village. Following the Greek–Turkish population exchange, Greek refugee families in Selitsa were from East Thrace (3) in 1926. The 1928 Greek census recorded 2,359 village inhabitants. In 1928, the refugee families numbered 3 (7 people).

== See also ==
- List of settlements in the Kozani regional unit
