= Ethniko, Florina =

Ethniko
- Community
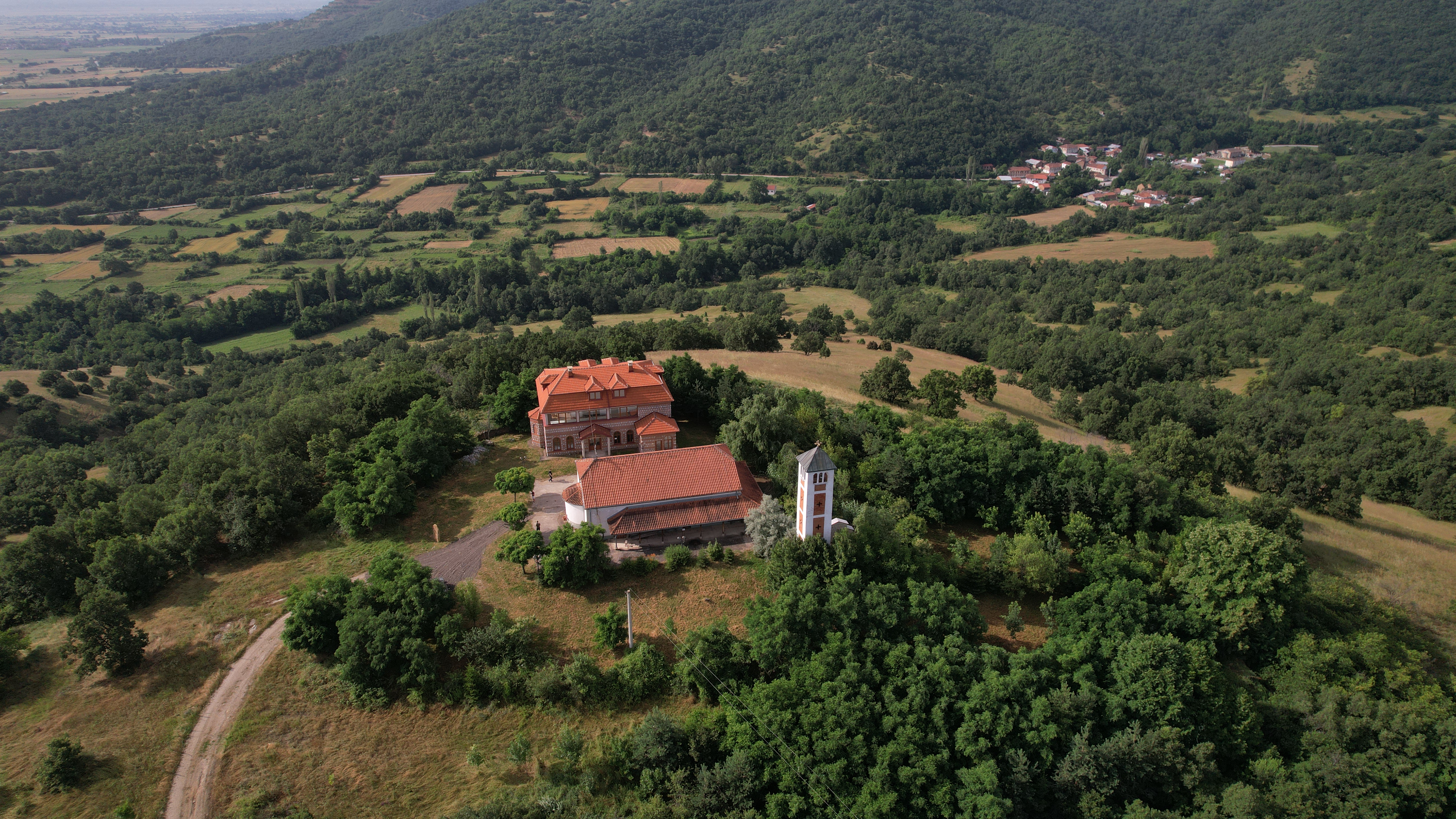
- Monastery of Dragosh (North Macedonia) with the village of Ethniko (Greece) in the background

- Location within Greece
- Coordinates: 40°52′14″N 21°21′18″E
- Country: Greece
- Geographic region: Macedonia
- Administrative region: Western Macedonia
- Regional unit: Florina
- Municipality: Florina
- Municipal unit: Kato Kleines

Population (2021)
  - Community: 49
- Time zone: UTC+2 (EET)
  - Summer (DST): UTC+3 (EEST)

Ethniko (Greek: Εθνικό, before 1927: Οψίρινα – Opsirina) is a village in the Florina Regional Unit in West Macedonia, Greece.

Ethniko had 85 inhabitants in 1981. In fieldwork done by anthropologist Riki Van Boeschoten in late 1993, Ethniko was populated by Slavophones. The Macedonian language was used by people of all ages, both in public and private settings, and as the main language for interpersonal relationships. Some elderly villagers had little knowledge of Greek.
