= Kaloneri =

Village in the Kozani regional unit, Greece

Kaloneri Καλονέρι
- Community
- Location within Greece
- Coordinates: 40°17′21″N 21°29′26″E
- Country: Greece
- Administrative region: Western Macedonia
- Regional unit: Kozani
- Municipality: Voio
- Municipal unit: Askio

Population (2021)
  - Community: 403
- Time zone: UTC+2 (EET)
  - Summer (DST): UTC+3 (EEST)
- Postal code: 50300

Kaloneri (Greek: Καλονέρι, before 1927: Βρογγίστα – Vrongista), is a village and the seat of the former Askio municipality in the Kozani regional unit, Greece. It is situated at an altitude of 630 m (2,070 ft) above sea level. The population was 403 in 2021.

A notable event of the area is the feast of St. Kyriaki.

Vrongista was a mixed village and a part of its population were Greek speaking Muslim Vallahades. The 1920 Greek census recorded 692 people in the village, and 630 inhabitants (128 families) were Muslim in 1923. Following the Greek–Turkish population exchange, Greek refugee families in Vrongista were from East Thrace (41), Asia Minor (80) and Pontus (10) in 1926. The 1928 Greek census recorded 621 village inhabitants. In 1928, the refugee families numbered 120 (504 people).
