= Akritas, Florina =

Akritas
- Community
- Location within Greece
- Coordinates: 40°48′52″N 21°18′8″E
- Country: Greece
- Administrative region: Western Macedonia
- Regional unit: Florina
- Municipality: Florina
- Municipal unit: Kato Kleines

Population (2021)
  - Community: 86
- Time zone: UTC+2 (EET)
  - Summer (DST): UTC+3 (EEST)

Akritas (Greek: Ακρίτας, before 1955: Μπούφι – Boufi; Bulgarian and Macedonian: Буф, Buf) is a village in the Florina Regional Unit, Western Macedonia, Greece.

The new modern Greek name of the village Akritas is a toponym with national or patriotic associations based on historical contexts in the wider region.

A large Christian village, it was recorded in an Ottoman document of the late 15th century. The population was 2,200 in 1912.

A Greek police lieutenant in 1934 wrote to the prefect of Florina and described Boufi as "a centre of anti–Greek propaganda". Children spoke and wrote in the Bulgarian language, the Bulgarian national anthem was known by the young men and the village was strongly influenced by a Macedonian–Bulgarian diaspora organisation in the US. He stated many villagers identified themselves as Macedonians and not Greeks, while the language they used was referred to as Macedonian instead of Bulgarian.

In the Greek Civil War, Boufi was a Slavophone village and during the conflict some 200 village children were removed with force to Florina by soldiers from the Greek government. Several older children without their parents fled to Yugoslavia and others crossed the border with their mothers. Pre–war and post–war immigration from Akritas led to the formation of a diaspora and most of the village population lives abroad in the northern suburbs of Melbourne in Australia.

Akritas had 190 inhabitants in 1981. In fieldwork done by anthropologist Riki Van Boeschoten in late 1993, Akritas was populated by Slavophones. The Macedonian language was spoken in the village by people over 30 in public and private settings. Children understood the language, but mostly did not use it.

In the late 20th century, several of the child refugees who had immigrated to either Australia or Canada had difficulties obtaining official documents to enter Greece due to names of villages such as Boufi being changed into Akritas. Some Macedonians living in Bitola who were born in Akritas have returned as adults to the village for visits in the 1990s and remaining locals informed them about details on land ownership and home construction. In the early 21st century, the village had 100 inhabitants.
