= Kingdom of Greece =

Period of Greek statehood from 1832 to 1923 and 1935 to 1973

Kingdom of Greece Βασίλειον τῆς Ἑλλάδος Vasíleion tis Elládos
- 1832–1924; 1935–1973^{a}
- Flag (1863–1973) Coat of arms (1936–1973)
- Motto: Ελευθερία ή Θάνατος; Elefthería í Thánatos "Freedom or Death"
- Anthem: Ύμνος εις την Ελευθερίαν; Ýmnos eis tin Eleftherían "Hymn to Liberty" Royal anthem: Τον βασιλέα μας σώσον, Θεέ! "Save Our King, God!" (1832–1862)
- Capital: Nafplio (1832–1834); Athens (1834–1973)
- Largest city: Athens
- Official languages: Greek^{b}
- Religion: Greek Orthodoxy (official)
- Demonym: Greek
- Government: Absolute monarchy (1832–1844); Parliamentary semi-constitutional monarchy (1844–1924; 1935–1941; 1944–1973): under a military dictatorship (1936–1941; 1967–1973)
- King
  - 1832–1862: Otto (House of Wittelsbach)
  - 1863–1913: George (House of Glucksburg)
  - 1964–1973 (last): Constantine II (House of Glücksburg)
- Prime Minister
  - 1833 (first): Spyridon Trikoupis
  - 1967–1973 (last): Georgios Papadopoulos
- Legislature: None (rule by decree) (1832–1844); Parliament (1843–1924; 1935–1941; 1944–1973)
  - Upper house: Senate (1844–1864)
  - Lower house: Chamber of Deputies (1844–1863)
- History
  - Kingdom established: 7 May 1832
  - Constitution granted: 3 September 1843
  - King Otto ousted: 23 October 1862
  - Goudi coup: 28 August 1909
  - Balkan Wars: 1912–1913
  - National Schism: 1915–1917
  - Asia Minor Campaign: 1919–1922
  - Second Republic: 1924–1935
  - Metaxas regime: 1936–1941
  - Axis occupation: 1941–1944
  - Greek Civil War: 1946–1949
  - Military Junta: 21 April 1967
  - Republic declared: 1 June 1973

Population
  - 1837: 926,000
  - 1971 census: 8,768,641
- Currency: Greek drachma (₯)
Preceded by
1832: First Hellenic Republic
1864: Ionian Islands
1912: Principality of Samos
Free State of Icaria
1913: Cretan State
1914: Northern Epirus
1935: Second Hellenic Republic
1944: Hellenic State
1947: Italian Islands of the Aegean
Kingdom of Bulgaria
Succeeded by
1924: Second Hellenic Republic
1941: Hellenic State
Kingdom of Bulgaria
1947: Provisional Democratic Government
1973: Hellenic Republic (military junta)
- Today part of: Greece; Turkey
- 1. On 1 June 1973, the Greek military junta unilaterally abolished the monarchy, then held a rigged referendum on 29 July 1973. This decision was ratified in 1974.; 2. Katharevousa was the conservative form of the Modern Greek language used both for literary and official purposes, though seldom in daily language.

The Kingdom of Greece (Greek: Βασίλειον τῆς Ἑλλάδος, romanised: Vasíleion tis Elládos, pronounced [vaˈsili.on tis eˈlaðos]) was the Greek state established in 1832 by the Treaty of Constantinople, which formally recognised Greece as an independent state and established it as a monarchy, following the Greek War of Independence.

It succeeded the First Hellenic Republic and was internationally recognised by the Treaty of Constantinople, through which Greece secured full independence from the Ottoman Empire after nearly four centuries. The country remained a kingdom until 1924, when the Second Hellenic Republic was proclaimed. The monarchy was restored in 1935, after a referendum, and continued until its final abolition by the Regime of the Colonels in 1973. The referendum of the colonels, however, was widely regarded as rigged, so a second definitive referendum was held after the regime's fall in 1974 and confirmed the abolition of the monarchy, establishing the Third Hellenic Republic.

For much of its existence, the Kingdom's main ideological goal was the Megali Idea, which sought to annex lands with predominantly Greek populations.

King Otto ruled as an absolute monarch from 1835 until the 3 September 1843 Revolution, which transformed Greece into a constitutional monarchy, with the creation of the Prime Minister as head of government, universal male suffrage and a constitution. A popular insurrection deposed Otto in 1862, precipitating the gradual collapse of the early Greek parties (English, French, Russian), which had dominated Greek politics. The Greek National Assembly's election of George I in 1863 brought the transfer of the Ionian Islands from British rule in 1864. In his fifty–year reign, George presided over long periods of political instability, and wielded considerable power despite his role as a constitutional monarch. Prime Ministers, such as Alexandros Koumoundouros and Charilaos Trikoupis, shaped the politics and identity of the kingdom (including the annexation of Thessaly in 1881) before an economic depression and a catastrophic defeat in the Thirty Days' War weakened the Greek state. The Goudi coup in 1909 brought Eleftherios Venizelos to power and brought sweeping reforms, culminating in the Hellenic Army's victory in the Balkan Wars, led militarily by Crown Prince Constantine, who became King following George I's assassination during the First Balkan War.

The dispute and deep political rift of Monarchist and Venizelist forces regarding Greece's initial neutrality in World War I led to the National Schism, which, with Allied intervention, culminated in Constantine's exile, Venizelos' reinstatement as Prime Minister and Greece's entry into World War I. After victory in the Macedonian Front and success in the Asia Minor Campaign against the Ottomans, King Alexander, Constantine's second son, died in 1920, which triggered a constitutional crisis, culminating in anti-Venizelist candidate Dimitrios Gounaris' victory in the 1920 elections and a plebiscite confirming Constantine's return to the throne. Greece's disastrous defeat in Asia Minor two years later triggered the 11 September 1922 Revolution, which brought the abdication of Constantine in favour of his first son George II and the execution of Monarchist leaders in the Trial of the Six. The Treaty of Lausanne and the population exchange, along with a failed Monarchist coup in 1923, brought the proclamation of the Second Hellenic Republic in 1924.

A failed Venizelist coup in 1935 rapidly accelerated the Second Republic's collapse, with the Monarchy restored following a sham referendum in November 1935. Prime Minister Ioannis Metaxas initiated a self-coup with the support of King George on 4 August 1936 and established the 4th of August Regime, a Metaxist and ultranationalist dictatorship with Metaxas wielding absolute power. Following Greece's entry into World War II and the Greco-Italian War, the German invasion of Greece toppled the Monarchy and conquered Greece, resulting in a triple occupation by the Axis powers. (Note: During the period of Axis occupation (1941–1944) during World War II, the Hellenic State collaborationist regime lay in opposition to the internationally recognised Greek government in exile in Egypt.) After the withdrawal of German forces in late 1944, the Monarchy was reaffirmed by victory in the three-year Greek Civil War. Spearheaded by Prime Ministers Alexandros Papagos and Konstantinos Karamanlis, Greece entered an economic miracle, but a successful coup on 21 April 1967 established the Regime of the Colonels, a military dictatorship. A failed counter-coup by King Constantine II on 13 December 1967 forced him into exile, and the Monarchy was dissolved in 1973, a decision that was reaffirmed by a democratic referendum in 1974.

== Background ==
The Greek-speaking Eastern Roman Empire, also known as the Byzantine Empire, which ruled most of the Eastern Mediterranean region for over 1100 years, had been fatally weakened since the sacking of Constantinople by the Latin Crusaders in 1204.

The Ottomans captured Constantinople in 1453 and advanced southwards into the Balkan peninsula capturing Athens in 1458. The Greeks held out in the Peloponnese until 1460, and the Venetians and Genoese clung to some of the islands, but by 1500 most of the plains and islands of Greece were in Ottoman hands; while in contrast, the mountains and highlands of Greece were largely untouched, and were a refuge for Greeks to flee foreign rule and engage in guerrilla warfare.

== Preparation of the Greek War of Independence ==
In the context of an ardent desire for independence from Turkish rule, and with the explicit influence of similar secret societies elsewhere in Europe, three Greeks came together in 1814 in Odesa to decide the constitution for a secret organisation in Freemasonic fashion. Its purpose was to unite all Greeks in an armed organisation to overthrow Turkish rule. The three founders were Nikolaos Skoufas from the Arta province, Emmanuil Xanthos from Patmos, and Athanasios Tsakalov from Ioannina. Soon after they initiated a fourth member, Panagiotis Anagnostopoulos from Andritsaina.

Many revolts were planned across the Greek region and the first of them was launched on 6 March 1821, in the Danubian principalities. It was put down by the Ottomans, but the torch had been lit and by the end of the same month, the Peloponnese was in open revolt.

== Greek War of Independence ==
Map showing the original territory of the Kingdom of Greece, as defined in the treaty of 1832 (in dark blue)

In 1821, the Greek-speaking populations of Peloponnesus revolted against the Ottoman Empire. Following a region-wide struggle that lasted several months, the Greek War of Independence led to the establishment of the first autonomous Greek state since the mid-15th century.

In January 1822, the First National Assembly of Epidaurus passed the Greek Declaration of Independence (part of the country's First Constitution), which affirmed the sovereignty of Greece. However, the new Greek state was politically unstable and lacked the resources to preserve its territoriality in the long term. Most importantly, the country lacked international recognition and had no robust alliances in the Western world.

Following the recapture of the Greek territories by the Ottoman Empire, the great powers of that time (the United Kingdom, the Russian Empire, and the Kingdom of France) saw the Greek counter-offensive as an opportunity to weaken the Ottoman Empire further and in essence increase their influence in the Eastern Mediterranean. The Great Powers supported Greece to regain its independence and following a decisive battle in the Navarino Bay, a ceasefire was agreed in London (see Treaty of London (1827)). The autonomy of Greece was ultimately recognised by the London Protocol of 1828 and its full independence from the Ottoman Empire by the Protocol of London of 1830.

In 1831, the assassination of the first governor of Greece, Count Ioannis Kapodistrias, created political and social instability that endangered the country's relationship with its allies. To avoid escalation and in order to strengthen Greece's ties with the great powers, Greece agreed to become a kingdom in 1832 (see London Conference of 1832). Prince Leopold of Saxe-Coburg and Gotha was initially the first candidate for the Greek throne; however, he turned down the offer. Otto von Wittelsbach, Prince of Bavaria was chosen as its first king. Otto arrived at the provisional capital, Nafplion, in 1833 aboard a British warship.

== History ==
=== Reign of King Otto (1832–1862) ===
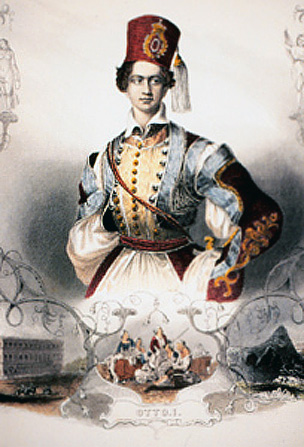
Otto, the first king of modern Greece

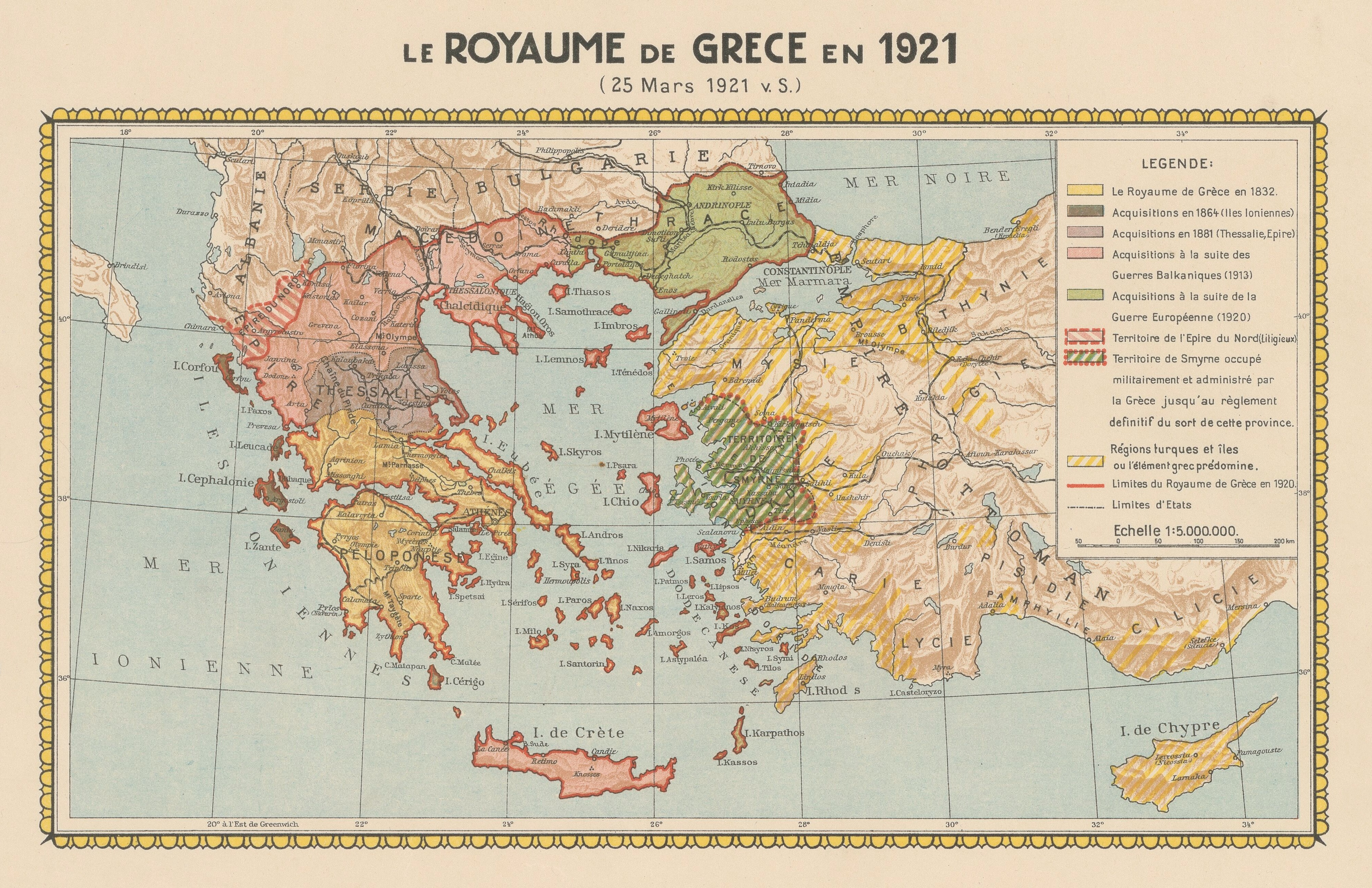
Kingdom of Greece 1832–1921 expansion

Otto's reign would prove troubled, but managed to last for 30 years before he and his wife, Queen Amalia, left the way they came, aboard a British warship. During the early years of his reign, a group of Bavarian Regents ruled in his name and made themselves very unpopular by trying to impose German ideas of rigid hierarchical government on the Greeks, while keeping most significant state offices away from them. Nevertheless, they laid the foundations of a Greek administration, army, justice system and education system. Otto was sincere in his desire to give Greece good government, but he suffered from two great handicaps, him being a Roman Catholic while most Greek people were Orthodox Christian, and the fact that his marriage to Queen Amalia remained childless. Furthermore, the new kingdom tried to eliminate the traditional banditry, something that in many cases meant conflict with some old revolutionary fighters (klephtes) who continued to exercise this practice.

The Bavarian Regents ruled until 1837, when at the insistence of Britain and France, they were recalled, and Otto after that appointed Greek ministers, although Bavarian officials still ran most of the administration and the army. But Greece still had no legislature and no constitution. Greek discontent grew until a revolt broke out in Athens in September 1843. Otto agreed to grant a constitution, and convened a National Assembly which met in November. The new constitution created a bicameral parliament, consisting of an Assembly (Vouli) and a Senate (Gerousia). Power then passed into the hands of a group of politicians, most of whom had been commanders in the War of Independence against the Ottomans.

Greek politics in the 19th century was dominated by the national question. Greeks dreamed of liberating all the Greek lands and reconstituting a state embracing them all, with Constantinople as its capital. This was called the Great Idea (Megali Idea), and it was sustained by almost continuous rebellions against Ottoman rule in Greek-speaking territories, notably Crete, Thessaly and Macedonia. During the Crimean War the British occupied Piraeus to prevent Greece declaring war on the Ottomans as a Russian ally.

A new generation of Greek politicians was growing increasingly intolerant of King Otto's continuing interference in government. In 1862, the King dismissed his prime minister, the former admiral Konstantinos Kanaris, the most prominent politician of the period. This dismissal provoked a military rebellion, forcing Otto to accept the inevitable and leave the country. The Greeks then asked Britain to send Queen Victoria's son Prince Alfred as their new king, but this was vetoed by the other Powers. (Note: After the disposition of Otto, a head of state referendum was held in Greece, with the first result being Prince Alfred of the United Kingdom. However, the Conference of 1832, had prohibited any of the Great Powers' ruling families from accepting the crown of Greece. Also, Queen Victoria was opposed to the idea.) Instead, a young Danish prince became King George I. George was a very popular choice as a constitutional monarch, and he agreed that his sons would be raised in the Greek Orthodox faith. As a reward to the Greeks for adopting a pro-British king, Britain ceded the United States of the Ionian Islands to Greece.

=== Religious life ===
Under Ottoman rule, the Greek Church was a part of the Ecumenical Patriarchate of Constantinople. The Ottoman authorities, who were Muslim, did not interfere with the church. With the establishment of the Greek Kingdom, however, the government decided to take control of the church, breaking away from the Patriarch in Constantinople. The government declared the church to be autocephalous (independent) in 1833 by a political decision of Bavarian regents acting for King Otto, who was a minor. (Note: Specifically, this decision was dictated by the fact that the Patriarchate was in the Ottoman Empire's territory and undoubtedly under the direct influence of the Sultan.) The decision roiled Greek politics for decades as royal authorities took increasing control. The new status was finally recognised as such by the Patriarchate in 1850, under compromise conditions with the issue of a special Tomos (decree), which brought it back to a normal status. As a result, it retains certain special links with the Mother Church in Constantinople. At the time, there were only four bishops, and they had political roles.

In 1833, Parliament dissolved 400 small monasteries having fewer than five monks or nuns. Priests were not salaried; in rural areas, he was often also a peasant farmer, dependent on agricultural work and the fees and offerings of his parishioners. His ecclesiastical duties were limited to administering the Holy Mysteries, presiding over funerals, blessing of crops, and performing exorcisms. Few attended seminaries. By the 1840s, there was a nationwide revival, run by travelling preachers; the government arrested several and tried to suppress the revival, but it was too powerful when revivalists denounced three bishops for purchasing their office. By the 1880s, the Anaplasis ("Regeneration") Movement led to renewed spiritual energy and enlightenment. It fought against rationalistic and materialistic ideas seeping in from secular Western Europe. It promoted catechism schools, and Bible study groups.

=== Reign of King George I (1863–1913) ===
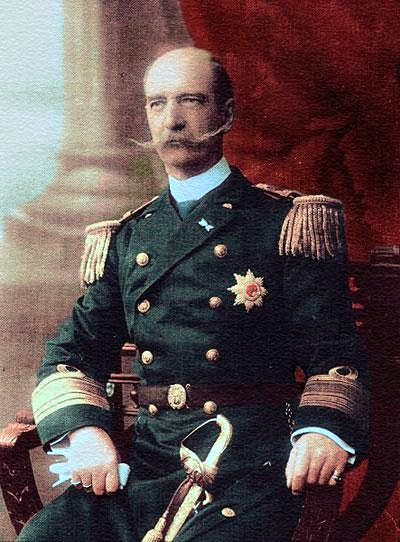
King George I of the Hellenes

At the urging of Britain and King George, Greece adopted a much more democratic constitution in 1864. The powers of the king were reduced and the Senate was abolished, (Note: The senate was abolished in 1864's constitution for being an undemocratic assembly, taking into consideration the fact that its members were appointed by the king and their term of office was life-long.) and the franchise was extended to all adult males. Nevertheless, Greek politics remained heavily dynastic, as it had always been. Family names such as Zaimis, Rallis and Trikoupis repeatedly occurred as prime ministers. Although parties were centred around the individual leaders, often bearing their names, two broad political tendencies existed: the liberals, led first by Charilaos Trikoupis and later by Eleftherios Venizelos, and the conservatives, led initially by Theodoros Deligiannis and later by Thrasivoulos Zaimis.

Trikoupis and Deligiannis dominated Greek politics in the later 19th century, alternating in office. Trikoupis favoured cooperation with Great Britain in foreign affairs, the creation of infrastructure and an indigenous industry, raising protective tariffs and progressive social legislation, while the more populist Deligiannis depended on the promotion of Greek nationalism and the Megali idea.

Greece remained a quite impoverished country throughout the 19th century. The country lacked raw materials, infrastructure and capital. Agriculture was mostly at the subsistence level, and the only important export commodities were currants, raisins and tobacco. Some Greeks grew rich as merchants and shipowners, and Piraeus became a major port, but little of this wealth found its way to the Greek peasantry. Greece remained hopelessly in debt to London finance houses.

By the 1890s Greece was virtually bankrupt, and public insolvency was declared in 1893. Poverty was rife in the rural areas and the islands and was eased only by large-scale emigration to the United States. There was little education in the countryside. Nevertheless, there was progress in building communications and infrastructure, and elegant public buildings were erected in Athens. Despite the bad financial situation, Athens staged the revival of the Olympic Games in 1896, which proved a great success.

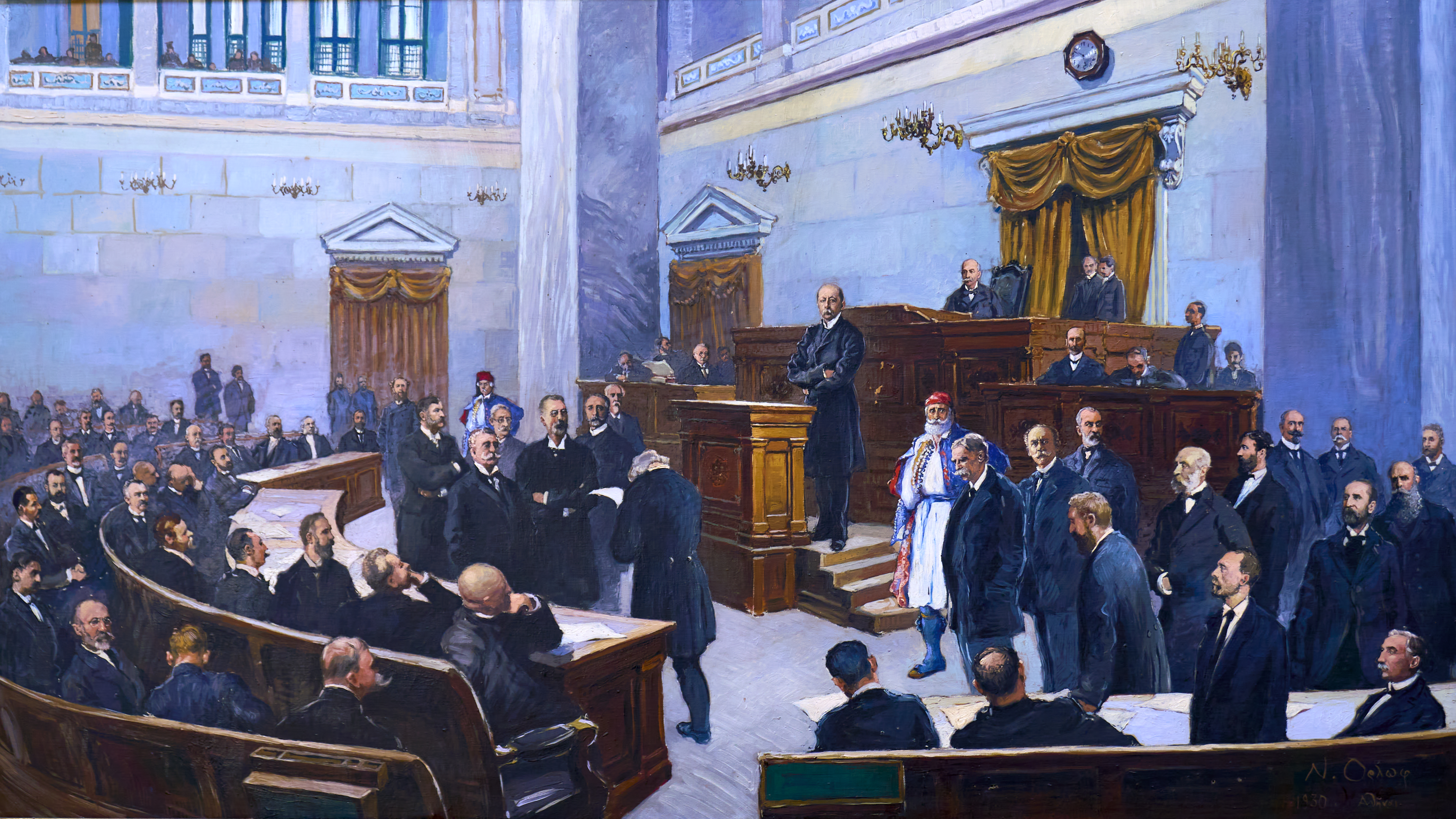
The Hellenic Parliament in the 1880s, with PM Charilaos Trikoupis standing at the podium

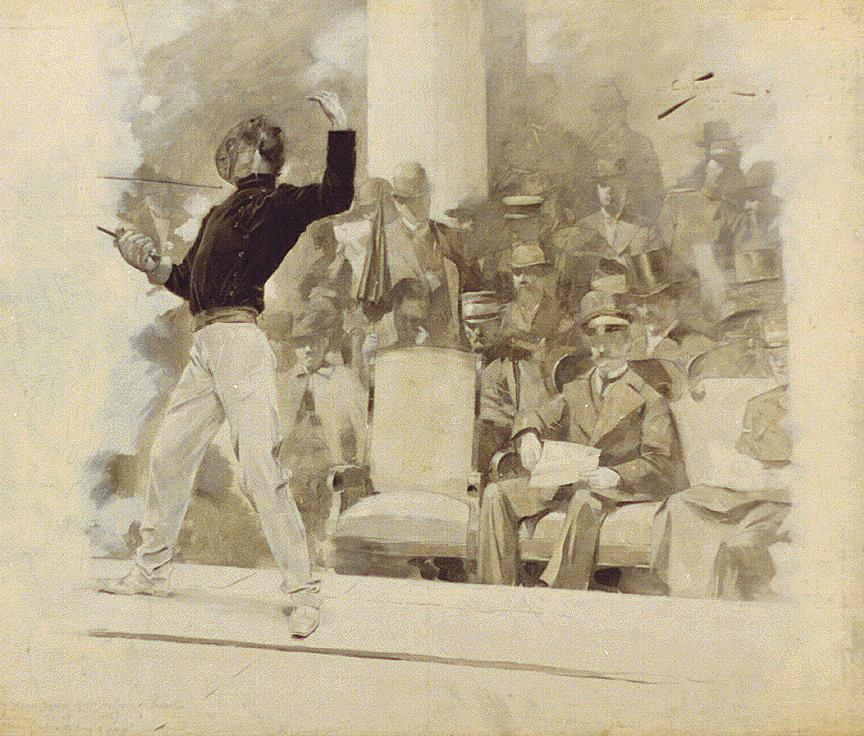
Fencing before King George, during the 1896 Summer Olympics

The parliamentary process developed greatly in Greece during the reign of George I. Initially, the royal prerogative in choosing his prime minister remained and contributed to governmental instability, until the introduction of the dedilomeni principle of parliamentary confidence in 1875 by the reformist Charilaos Trikoupis. Clientelism and frequent electoral upheavals, however, remained the norm in Greek politics and frustrated the country's development. Corruption and Trikoupis' increased spending to create necessary infrastructure like the Corinth Canal overtaxed the weak Greek economy, forcing the declaration of public insolvency in 1893 and to accept the imposition of an International Financial Commission to pay off the country's debtors.

Another political issue in 19th-century Greece was uniquely Greek: the language question. The Greek people spoke a form of Greek called Demotic. Many of the educated elite saw this as a peasant dialect and were determined to restore the glories of Ancient Greece. Government documents and newspapers were consequently published in Katharevousa (purified) Greek, a form closer to Ancient Greek, which few ordinary Greeks could read. Liberals favoured recognising Demotic as the national language, but conservatives and the Orthodox Church resisted all such efforts, to the extent that, when the New Testament was translated into Demotic in 1901, riots erupted in Athens and the government fell (the Evangeliaka). (Note: In 1901, Alexandros Pallis translated the Gospels into Modern Greek. This translation was known as Evangelika (Εὐαγγελικά). There were riots in Athens when this translation was published in a newspaper. University students protested that he tried to sell the country to the Slavs and the Turks in order to break Greek religious and national unity. All translations were confiscated. The Holy Synod of the Greek Orthodox Church resolved that any translation of the Holy Gospels is "profane" and redundant. It also "contributes to scandalising the consciousness [of Greeks] and to the distortion of [the Gospels'] divine concepts and didactic messages". See Bible translations into Greek for more information.) This issue would continue to plague Greek politics until the 1970s.

All Greeks were united, however, in their determination to liberate the Greek-speaking provinces of the Ottoman Empire. Especially in Crete, a prolonged revolt in 1866–1869 had raised nationalist fervour. When war broke out between Russia and the Ottomans in 1877, popular Greek sentiment rallied to Russia's side, but Greece was too poor and too concerned about British intervention to officially enter the war. Nevertheless, in 1881, Thessaly and small parts of Epirus were ceded to Greece in the context of the Treaty of Berlin, while frustrating Greek hopes of receiving Crete.

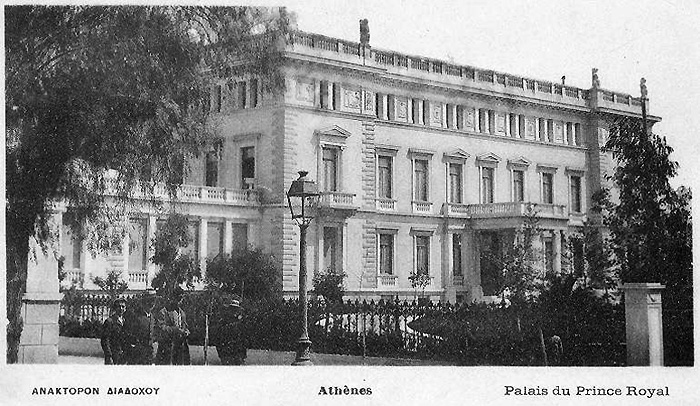
The Crown Prince's palace in 1909, today the Presidential Mansion

Greeks in Crete continued to stage regular revolts, and in 1897, the Greek government under Theodoros Deligiannis, bowing to popular pressure, declared war on the Ottomans. In the ensuing Greco-Turkish War of 1897 the badly trained and equipped Greek army was defeated by the Ottomans. Through the intervention of the Great Powers, however, Greece lost only a little territory along the border to Turkey, while Crete was established as an autonomous state with the High Commissioner being Prince George of Greece. Nationalist sentiment among Greeks in the Ottoman Empire continued to grow, and by the 1890s there were constant disturbances in Macedonia. Here the Greeks were in competition not only with the Ottomans but also with the Bulgarians, engaged in an armed propaganda struggle for the hearts and minds of the ethnically mixed local population, the so-called "Macedonian Struggle". In July 1908, the Young Turk Revolution broke out in the Ottoman Empire.

Taking advantage of the Ottoman internal turmoil, Austria–Hungary annexed Bosnia and Herzegovina, and Bulgaria declared its independence from the Ottoman Empire. On Crete, the local population, led by a young politician named Eleftherios Venizelos, declared Enosis, union with Greece, provoking another crisis. The fact that the Greek government, led by Dimitrios Rallis, proved unable likewise to take advantage of the situation and bring Crete into the fold, rankled with many Greeks, especially with young officers. These formed a secret society, the "Military League", with the purpose of emulating their Ottoman colleagues and seeking reforms. The resulting Goudi coup on 15 August 1909 marked a watershed in modern Greek history: as the military conspirators were inexperienced in politics, they asked Venizelos, who had impeccable liberal credentials, to come to Greece as their political adviser. Venizelos quickly established himself as an influential political figure, and his allies won the August 1910 elections. Venizelos became Prime Minister in October 1910, ushering a period of 25 years where his personality would dominate Greek politics.

Venizelos initiated a major reform programme, including a new and more liberal constitution and reforms in the spheres of public administration, education and economy. French and British military missions were invited for the army and navy respectively, and arms purchases were made. In the meantime, the Ottoman Empire's weaknesses were revealed by the ongoing Italo-Turkish War in Libya.

Through spring 1912, a series of bilateral agreements among the Balkan states (Greece, Bulgaria, Montenegro and Serbia) formed the Balkan League, which in October 1912 declared war on the Ottoman Empire.

=== Balkan Wars ===
==== Macedonian front ====
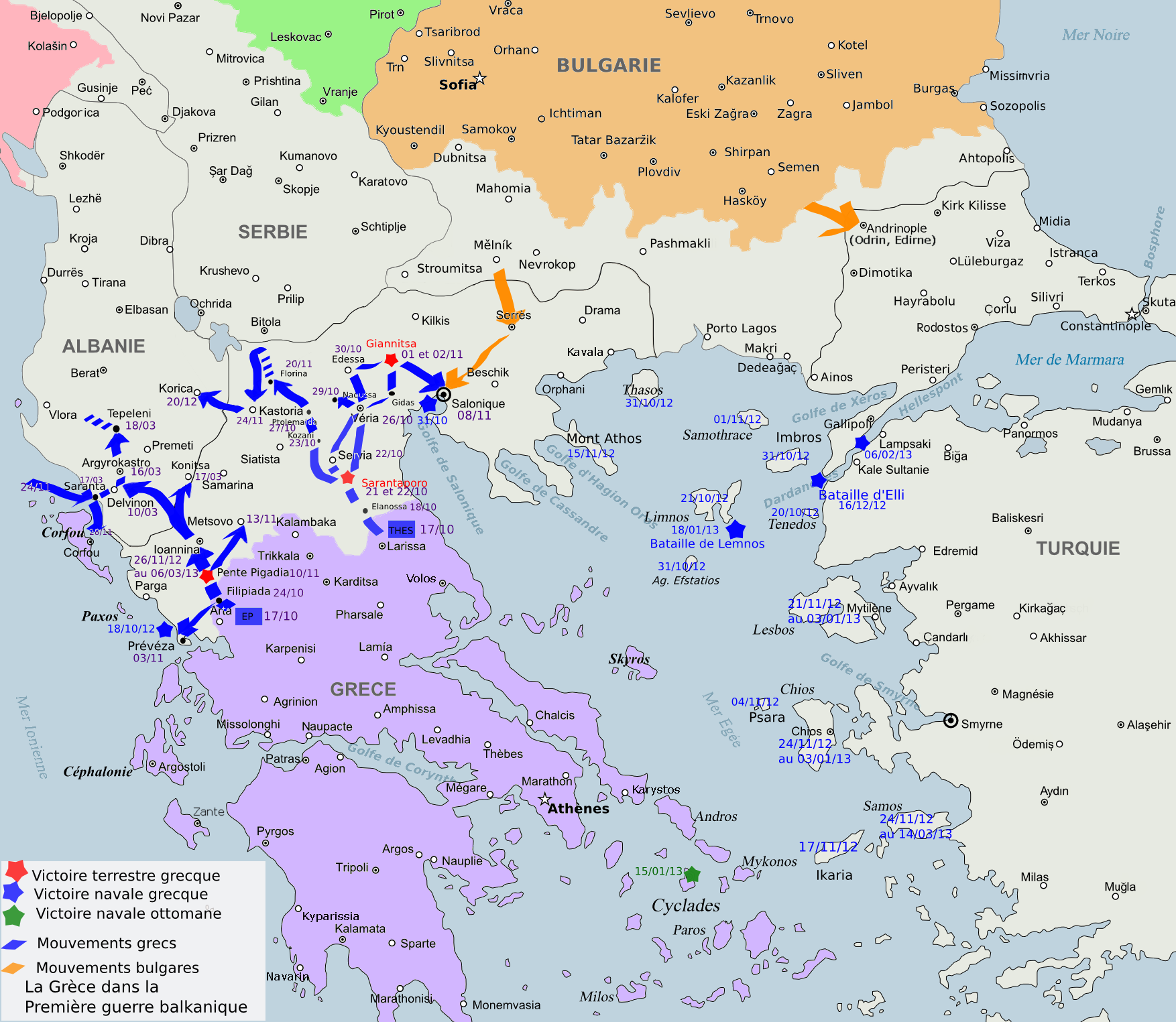
Greek military operations during the First Balkan War (borders depicted are post-Second Balkan War)

Ottoman intelligence had disastrously misread Greek military intentions. In retrospect, it would appear that the Ottoman staff believed that the Greek attack would be shared equally between the two primary avenues of approach, Macedonia and Epirus. The 2nd Army staff had therefore evenly balanced the combat strength of the seven Ottoman divisions between the Yanya Corps and VIII Corps, in Epirus and Macedonia respectively. The Greek Army also fielded seven divisions, but, having the initiative, concentrated all seven against VIII Corps, leaving only a number of independent battalions of scarcely divisional strength in the Epirus front. This had fatal consequences for the Western Group of Armies, since it led to the early loss of the strategic centre of all three Macedonian fronts, the city of Thessaloniki, a fact that sealed their fate. In an unexpectedly brilliant and rapid campaign, the Army of Thessaly seized the city. In the absence of secure sea lines of communications, the retention of the Thessaloniki-Constantinople corridor was essential to the overall strategic posture of the Ottoman Empire in the Balkans. Once this was gone, the defeat of the Ottoman Army became inevitable. To be sure, the Bulgarians and the Serbs played a significant role in the defeat of the main Ottoman armies. Their great victories at Kirk Kilise, Lule Burgas, Kumanovo, and Monastir shattered the Eastern and Vardar armies. However, these victories were not decisive in the sense that they ended the war. The Ottoman field armies survived, and in Thrace, they actually grew stronger day by day. In the strategic point of view these victories were enabled partially by the weakened condition of the Ottoman armies brought about by the active presence of the Greek army and fleet.

With the declaration of war, the Greek Army of Thessaly under Crown Prince Constantine advanced to the north, successfully overcoming Ottoman opposition in the fortified Straits of Sarantaporo. After another victory at Giannitsa on 2 November [O.S. 20 October] 1912, the Ottoman commander Hasan Tahsin Pasha surrendered Thessaloniki and its garrison of 26,000 men to the Greeks on 9 November [O.S. 27 October] 1912. Two Corps HQs (Ustruma and VIII), two Nizamiye divisions (14th and 22nd) and four Redif divisions (Salonika, Drama, Naslic and Serez) were thus lost to the Ottoman order of battle. Additionally, the Ottoman forces lost 70 artillery pieces, 30 machine guns and 70,000 rifles (Thessaloniki was the central arms depot for the Western Armies). The Ottoman forces estimated that 15,000 officers and men had been killed during the campaign in Macedonia, bringing total losses up to 41,000 soldiers. Another direct consequence was that the destruction of the Macedonian Army sealed the fate of the Ottoman Vardar Army, which was fighting the Serbs to the north. The fall of Thessaloniki left it strategically isolated, without logistical supply and depth to manoeuvre, ensuring its destruction.

Upon learning of the outcome of the battle of Yenidje, the Bulgarian high command urgently dispatched their 7th Rila Division from the north in the direction of the city. The division arrived there a week later, the day after its surrender to the Greeks. Until 10 November, the Greek-occupied zone had been expanded to the line from Lake Dojran to the Pangaion hills west to Kavalla. In southern Yugoslavia however, the lack of coordination between the Greek and Serbian HQs cost the Greeks a setback in the Battle of Vevi on 15 November [O.S. 2 November] 1912, when the Greek 5th Infantry Division crossed its way with the VI Ottoman Corps (a part of the Vardar Army consisting of the 16th, 17th and 18th Nizamiye divisions), retreating to Albania following the Battle of Prilep against the Serbs. The Greek division, surprised by the presence of the Ottoman Corps, isolated from the rest of Greek army and outnumbered by the now counterattacking Ottomans centred on Bitola, was forced to retreat. As a result, the Serbs beat the Greeks to Bitola.

==== Epirus front ====
In the Epirus front the Greek army was initially heavily outnumbered, but due to the passive attitude of the Ottomans succeeded in conquering Preveza (21 October 1912) and pushing north to the direction of Ioannina. On 5 November, Major Spyros Spyromilios led a revolt in the coastal area of Himarë and expelled the Ottoman garrison without facing significant resistance, while on 20 November Greek troops from western Macedonia entered Korçë. However, Greek forces in the Epirote front had not the numbers to initiate an offensive against the German-designed defensive positions of Bizani that protected the city of Ioannina, and therefore had to wait for reinforcements from the Macedonian front.

After the campaign in Macedonia was over, a large part of the Army was redeployed to Epirus, where Crown Prince Constantine himself assumed command. In the Battle of Bizani the Ottoman positions were breached and Ioannina taken on 6 March [O.S. 22 February] 1913. During the siege, on 8 February 1913, the Russian pilot N. de Sackoff, flying for the Greeks, became the first pilot ever shot down in combat, when his biplane was hit by ground fire following a bomb run on the walls of Fort Bizani. He came down near the small town of Preveza, on the coast north of the Ionian island of Lefkas, secured local Greek assistance, repaired his plane and resumed his flight back to base. The fall of Ioannina allowed the Greek army to continue its advance into northern Epirus, the southern part of modern Albania, which it occupied. There its advance stopped, although the Serbian line of control was very close to the north.

==== Naval operations in the Aegean and Ionian seas ====
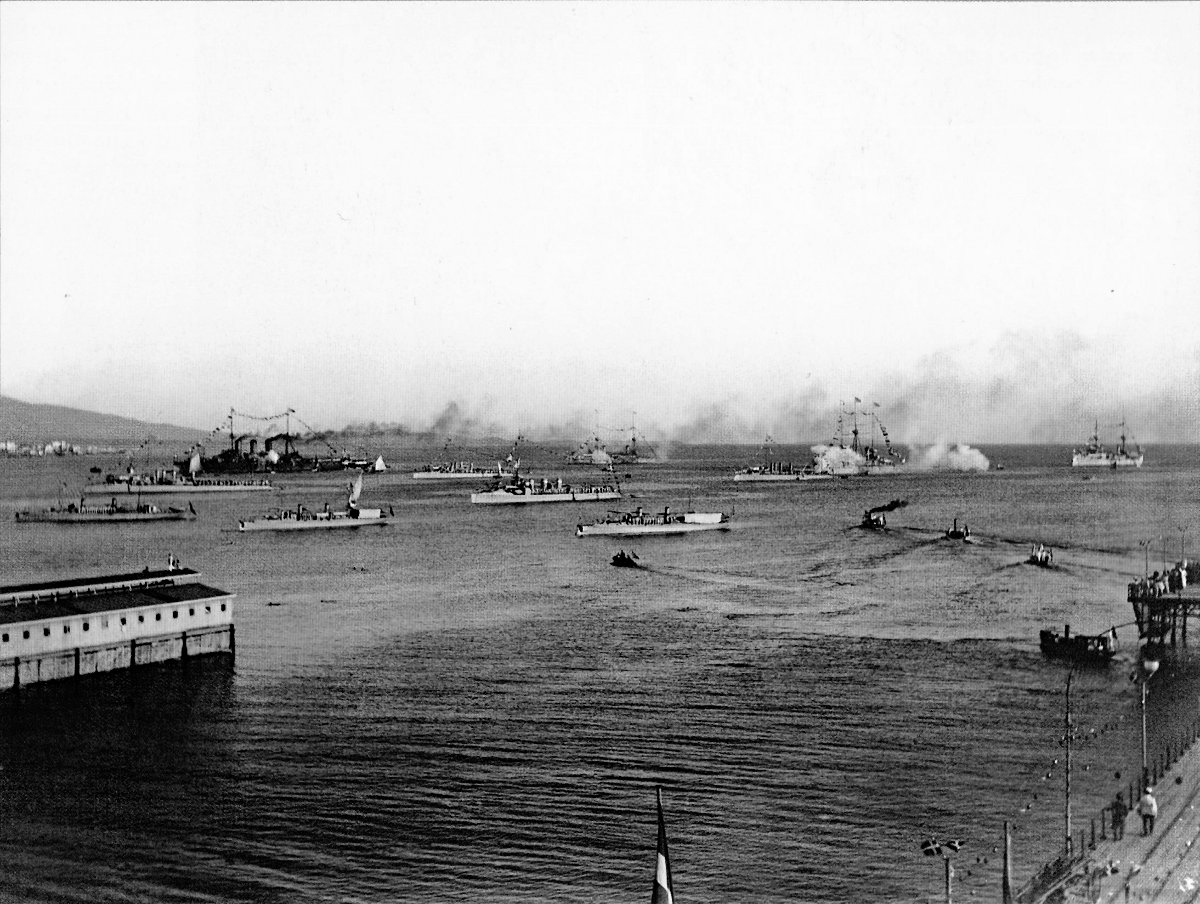
The Greek fleet assembled at Phaleron Bay on 5/18 October 1912, before sailing for Lemnos

On the outbreak of hostilities on 18 October, the Greek fleet, placed under the newly promoted Rear Admiral Pavlos Kountouriotis, sailed for the island of Lemnos, occupying it three days later (although fighting continued on the island until 27 October) and establishing an anchorage at Moudros Bay. This move was of major strategic importance, as it provided the Greeks with a forward base in close distance to the Dardanelles, the Ottoman fleet's main anchorage and refuge. In view of the Ottoman fleet's superiority in speed and broadside weight, the Greek planners expected it to sortie from the straits early in the war. Given the Greek fleet's unpreparedness resulting from the premature outbreak of the war, such an early Ottoman attack might well have been able to achieve a crucial victory. Instead, the Ottoman Navy spent the first two months of the war in operations against the Bulgarians in the Black Sea, giving the Greeks valuable time to complete their preparations and allowing them to consolidate their control of the Aegean.

By mid-November Greek naval detachments had seized the islands of Imbros, Thasos, Agios Efstratios, Samothrace, Psara and Ikaria, while landings were undertaken on the larger islands of Lesbos and Chios only on 21 and 27 November respectively. Substantial Ottoman garrisons were present on the latter, and their resistance was fierce. They withdrew into the mountainous interior and were not subdued until 22 December and 3 January respectively. Samos, officially an autonomous principality, was not attacked until 13 March 1913, out of a desire not to upset the Italians in the nearby Dodecanese. The clashes there were short-lived as the Ottoman forces withdrew to the Anatolian mainland so that the island was securely in Greek hands by 16 March.

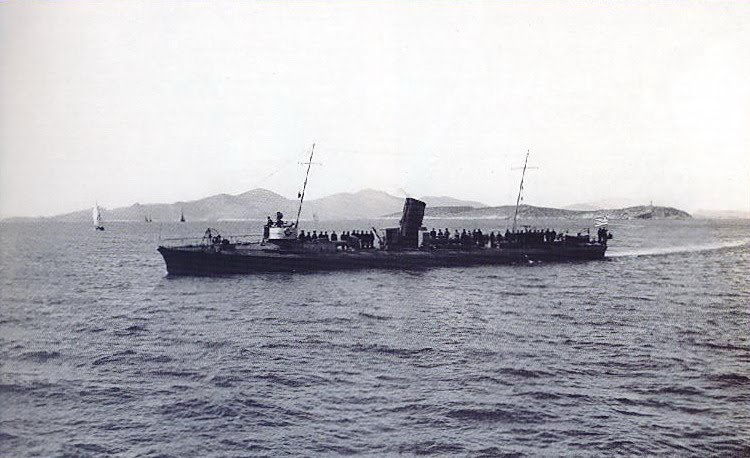
The torpedo boat Nikopolis, former Ottoman Antalya, captured at Preveza by the Greeks

At the same time, with the aid of numerous merchant ships converted to auxiliary cruisers, a loose naval blockade on the Ottoman coasts from the Dardanelles to Suez was instituted, which disrupted the Ottomans' flow of supplies (only the Black Sea routes to Romania remained open) and left some 250,000 Ottoman troops immobilised in Asia. In the Ionian Sea, the Greek fleet operated without opposition, ferrying supplies for the army units in the Epirus front. Furthermore, the Greeks bombarded and then blockaded the port of Vlorë in Albania on 3 December, and Durrës on 27 February. A naval blockade extending from the pre-war Greek border to Vlorë was also instituted on 3 December, isolating the newly established Provisional Government of Albania based there from any outside support.

Lieutenant Nikolaos Votsis scored a major success for Greek morale on 31 October: he sailed his torpedo boat No. 11, under the cover of night, into the harbour of Thessaloniki, sank the old Ottoman ironclad battleship Feth-i Bülend and escaped unharmed. On the same day, Greek troops of the Epirus Army seized the Ottoman naval base of Preveza. The Ottomans scuttled the four ships present there, but the Greeks were able to salvage the Italian-built torpedo-boats Antalya and Tokat, which were commissioned into the Greek Navy as Nikopolis and Tatoi respectively. On 9 November, the wooden Ottoman armed steamer Trabzon was intercepted and sunk by the Greek torpedo boat No. 14 under Lt. Periklis Argyropoulos off Ayvalık.

===== Confrontations off the Dardanelles =====
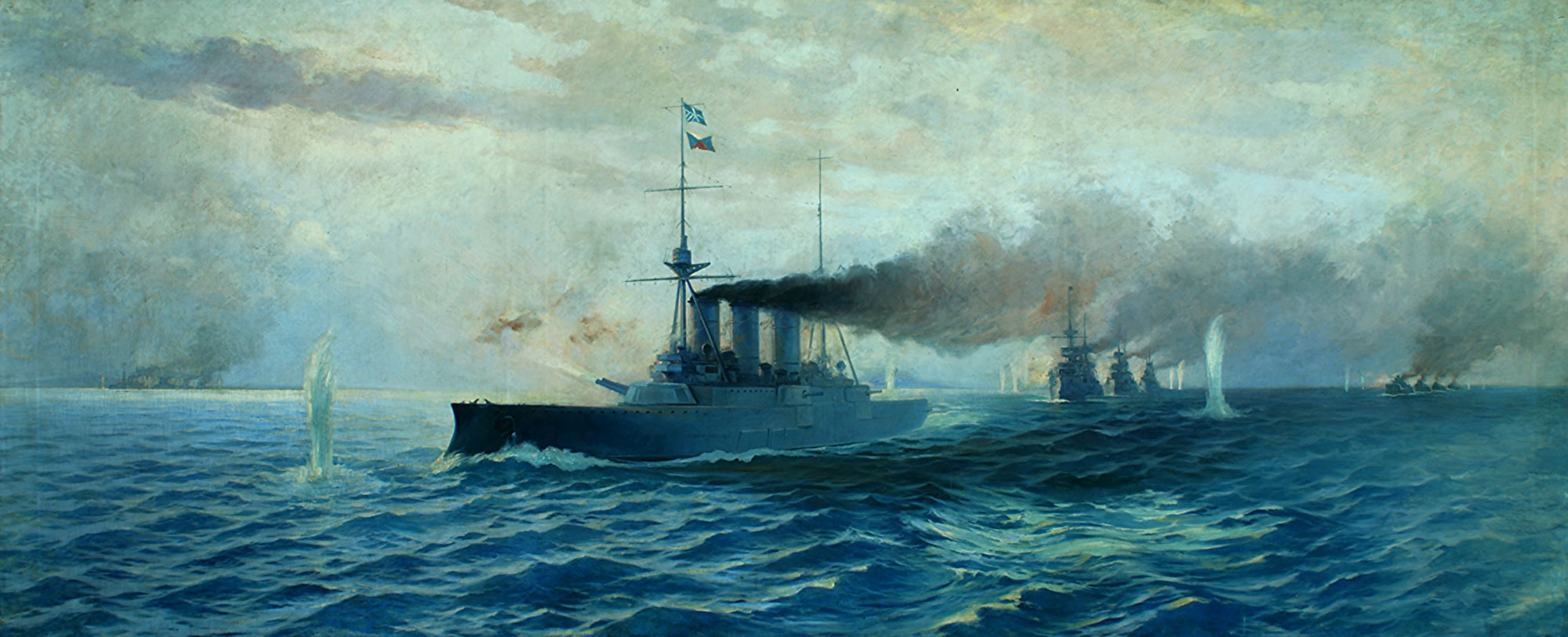
The Naval Battle of Elli, oil painting by Vassileios Chatzis, 1913

The main Ottoman fleet remained inside the Dardanelles for the early part of the war, while the Greek destroyers continuously patrolled the Straits' exit to report on a possible sortie. Kountouriotis suggested mining the straits, but was not taken up for fear of international reactions. On 7 December, the head of the Ottoman fleet Tahir Bey was replaced by Ramiz Naman Bey, the leader of the hawkish faction among the officer corps. A new strategy was agreed, whereby the Ottomans were to take advantage of any absence of the Greek flagship Averof to attack the other Greek ships. The Ottoman staff formulated a plan to lure a number of the Greek destroyers on patrol into a trap. A first such effort on 12 December failed due to boiler trouble, but the second try two days later resulted in an indecisive engagement between the Greek destroyers and the cruiser Mecidiye.

The war's first major fleet action, the Naval Battle of Elli, was fought two days later, on 16 December [O.S. 3 December] 1912. The Ottoman fleet, with four battleships, nine destroyers and six torpedo boats, sailed to the entrance of the straits. The lighter Ottoman vessels remained behind, but the battleship squadron moved on north under cover of the forts at Kumkale and engaged the Greek fleet, coming from Imbros, at 9:40. Leaving the older battleships behind, Kountouriotis led the Averof into independent action: utilising its superior speed, it cut across the Ottoman fleet's bow. Under fire from two sides, the Ottomans were quickly forced to withdraw to the Dardanelles. The whole engagement lasted less than an hour, in which the Ottoman fleet suffered heavy damage to the Barbaros Hayreddin and 18 dead and 41 wounded (most during their disorderly retreat) and the Greeks one dead and seven wounded.

In the aftermath of Elli, on 20 December the energetic Lt. Commander Rauf Bey was placed in effective command of the Ottoman fleet. Two days later he led his forces out, hoping again to trap the patrolling Greek destroyers between two divisions of the Ottoman fleet, one heading for Imbros and the other waiting at the entrance of the straits. The plan failed as the Greek ships quickly broke contact, while at the same time the Mecidiye came under attack by the Greek submarine Delfin, which launched a torpedo against it but missed; the first such attack in history. During this time, the Ottoman Army continued to press upon a reluctant Navy a plan for the re-occupation of Tenedos, which the Greek destroyers used as a base, by an amphibious operation. The operation was scheduled for 4 January. On that day, weather conditions were ideal, and the fleet was ready, but the Yenihan regiment earmarked for the operation failed to arrive on time. The naval staff nevertheless ordered the fleet to sortie, and an engagement developed with the Greek fleet, without any significant results on either side. Similar sorties followed on 10 and 11 January, but the results of these "cat and mouse" operations were always the same: "the Greek destroyers always managed to remain outside the Ottoman warships' range, and each time the cruisers fired a few rounds before breaking off the chase."

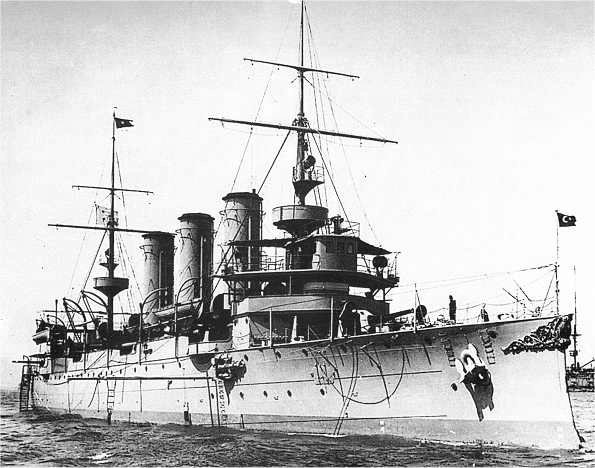
The Ottoman cruiser Hamidiye. Its exploits during its eight-month cruise through the Mediterranean were a major morale booster for the Ottomans.

In preparation for the next attempt to break the Greek blockade, the Ottoman Admiralty decided to create a diversion by sending the light cruiser Hamidiye, captained by Rauf Bey, to raid Greek merchant shipping in the Aegean. It was hoped that the Averof, the only major Greek unit fast enough to catch the Hamidiye, would be drawn in pursuit and leave the remainder of the Greek fleet weakened. In the event, Hamidiye slipped through the Greek patrols on the night of 14–15 January and bombarded the harbour of the Greek island of Syros, sinking the Greek auxiliary cruiser Makedonia which lay in anchor there (it was later raised and repaired). The Hamidiye then left the Aegean for the Eastern Mediterranean, making stops at Beirut and Port Said before entering the Red Sea. Although providing a major morale boost for the Ottomans, the operation failed to achieve its primary objective, as Kountouriotis refused to leave his post and pursue the Hamidiye.

Four days later, on 18 January [O.S. 5 January] 1913, when the Ottoman fleet again sallied from the straits towards Lemnos, it was defeated for a second time in the Naval Battle of Lemnos. This time, the Ottoman warships concentrated their fire on the Averof, which again made use of its superior speed and tried to "cross the T" of the Ottoman fleet. Barbaros Hayreddin was again heavily damaged, and the Ottoman fleet was forced to return to the shelter of the Dardanelles and their forts. The Ottomans suffered 41 killed and 101 wounded. It was the last attempt of the Ottoman Navy to leave the Dardanelles, thereby leaving the Greeks dominant in the Aegean. On 5 February [O.S. 24 January] 1913, a Greek Farman MF.7, piloted by Lt. Moutousis and with Ensign Moraitinis as an observer, carried out an aerial reconnaissance of the Ottoman fleet in its anchorage at Nagara, and launched four bombs on the anchored ships. Although it scored no hits, this operation is regarded as the first naval-air operation in military history.

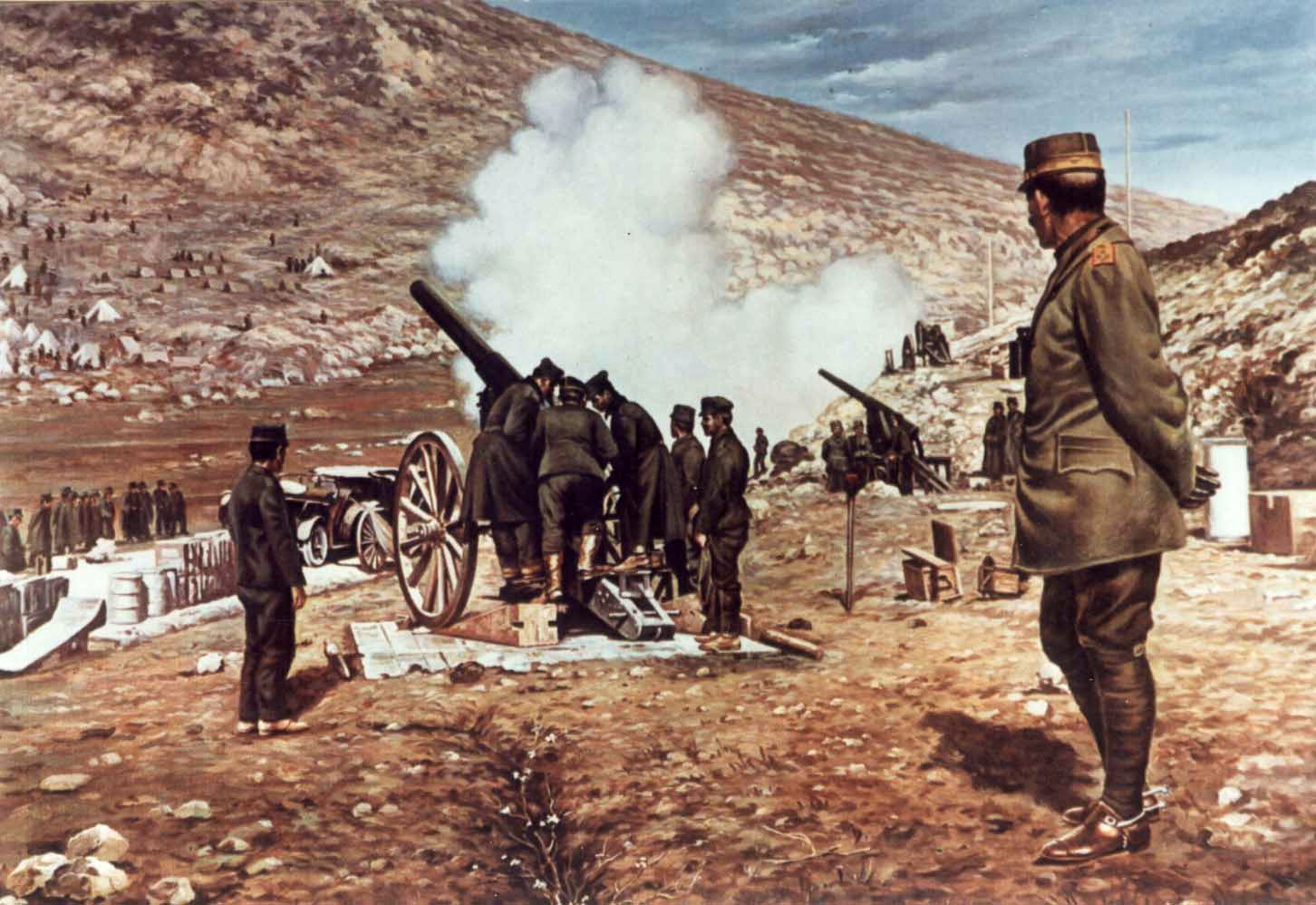
Crown Prince Constantine watching heavy artillery during the Battle of Bizani

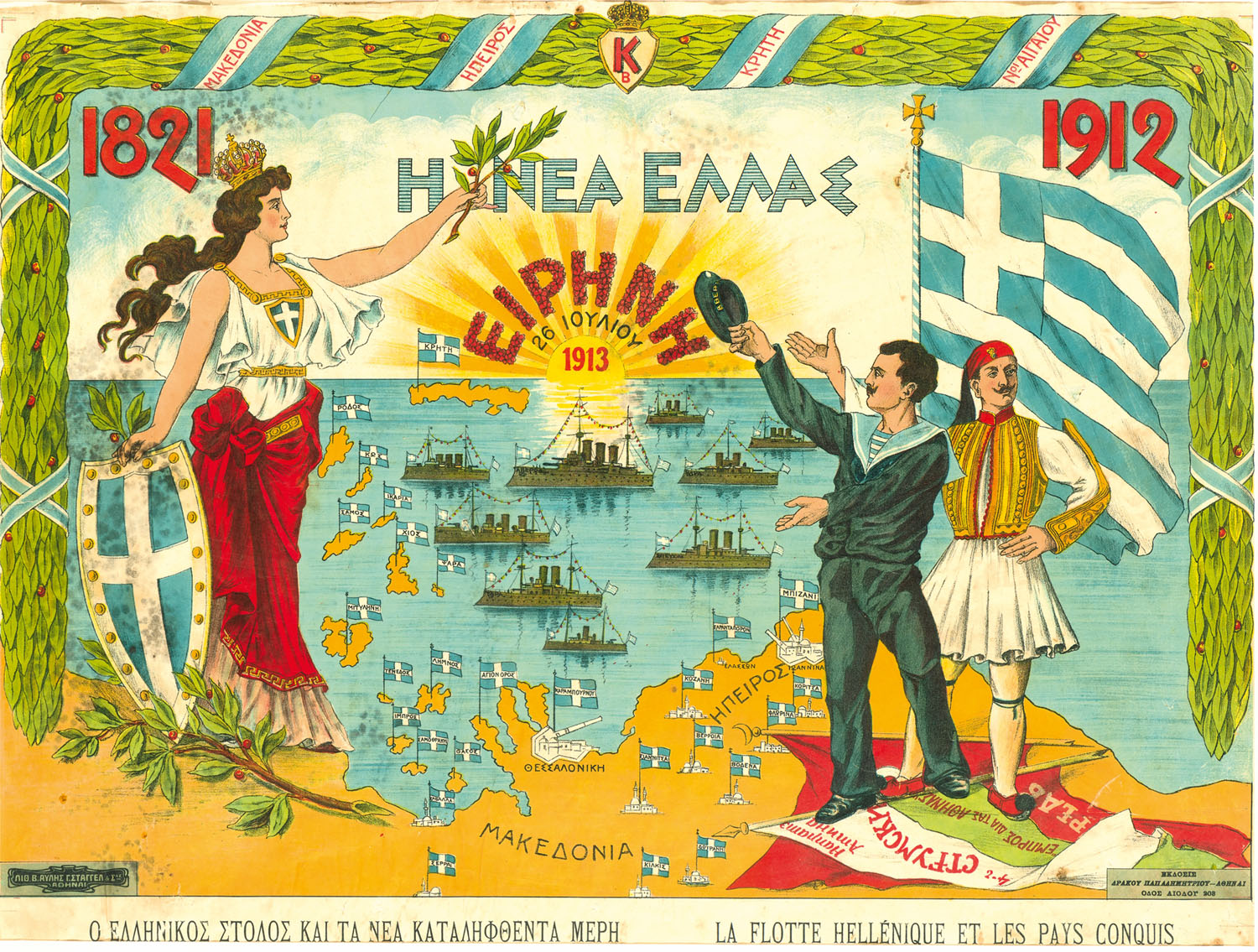
Poster celebrating the "New Hellas" after the Balkan Wars

General Nikola Ivanov, commander of the 2nd Bulgarian Army, acknowledged the role of the Greek fleet in the overall Balkan League victory by stating that "the activity of the entire Greek fleet and above all the Averof was the chief factor in the general success of the allies".

==== End of the War ====
The Treaty of London ended the war, but no one was left satisfied, and soon, the four allies fell out over the partition of Macedonia. In June 1913, Bulgaria attacked Greece and Serbia, beginning the Second Balkan War, but was beaten back. The Treaty of Bucharest, which concluded the war, left Greece with southern Epirus, the southern-half of Macedonia, Crete and the Aegean islands, except for the Dodecanese, which had been occupied by Italy in 1911. These gains nearly doubled Greece's area and population.

=== 1914–1924: World War I, crises, and the first abolition of the monarchy ===
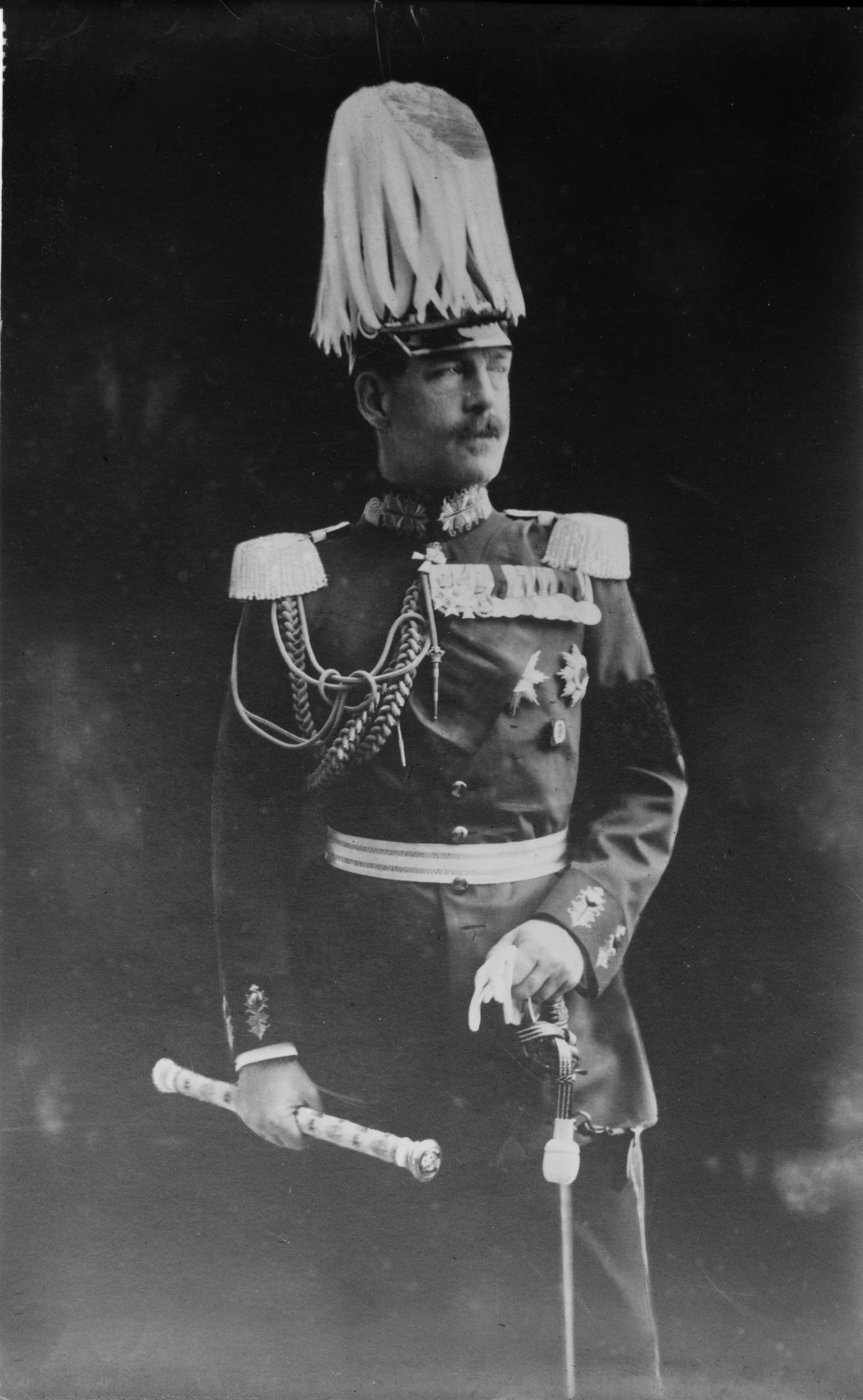
King Constantine I in a German field marshal's uniform. His pro-German sympathies caused him to favour a course of neutrality in the First World War.

In March 1913, an anarchist, Alexandros Schinas, assassinated King George in Thessaloniki, and his son came to the throne as Constantine I. Constantine was the first Greek king born in Greece and the first to be Greek Orthodox. His very name had been chosen in the spirit of romantic Greek nationalism (the Megali Idea), evoking the Byzantine emperors of that name. Besides, as the Commander-in-chief of the Greek Army during the Balkan Wars, his popularity was enormous, rivalled only by that of Venizelos, his Prime Minister.

When World War I broke out in 1914, despite Greece's treaty of alliance with Serbia, both leaders preferred to maintain a neutral stance. However, when, in early 1915, the Allied Powers asked for Greek help in the Dardanelles campaign, offering Cyprus in exchange, their diverging views became apparent: Constantine had been educated in Germany, was married to Sophia of Prussia, sister of Kaiser Wilhelm, and was convinced of the Central Powers' victory. Venizelos, on the other hand, was an ardent anglophile, and believed in an Allied victory.

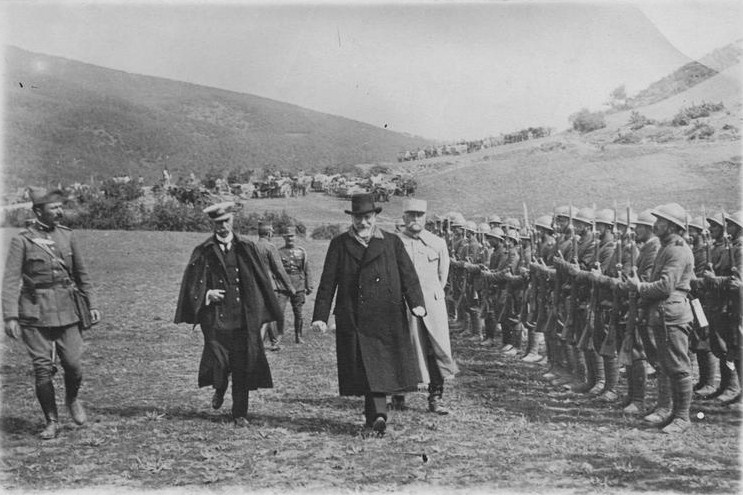
Venizelos reviewing a section of the Greek army on the Macedonian front during the First World War, 1917. He is accompanied by Admiral Pavlos Kountouriotis (left) and General Maurice Sarrail (right).

Since Greece, a maritime country, could not oppose the mighty British navy, and citing the need for a respite after two wars, King Constantine favoured continued neutrality, while Venizelos actively sought Greek entry in the war on the Allied side. Venizelos resigned, but won the next elections, and again formed the government. When Bulgaria entered the war as a German ally in October 1915, Venizelos invited Entente forces into Greece (the Salonika front), for which he was again dismissed by Constantine.

In August 1916, after several incidents where both combatants encroached upon the still theoretically neutral Greek territory, Venizelist officers rose up in Allied-controlled Thessaloniki, and Venizelos established a separate government there. Constantine was now ruling only in what was Greece before the Balkan Wars ("Old Greece"), and his government was subject to repeated humiliations from the Allies. In November 1916 the French occupied Piraeus, bombarded Athens and forced the Greek fleet to surrender. The royalist troops fired at them, leading to a battle between French and Greek royalist forces. There were also riots against supporters of Venizelos in Athens (the Noemvriana).

Alexander being sworn in as King of Greece after the abdication and departure of his father in June 1917

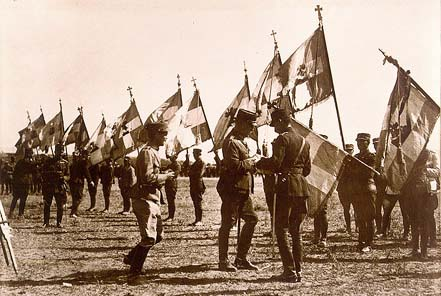
Constantine decorating regimental war flags of the Greek Army in Asia Minor during the Greco-Turkish War (1919–1922)

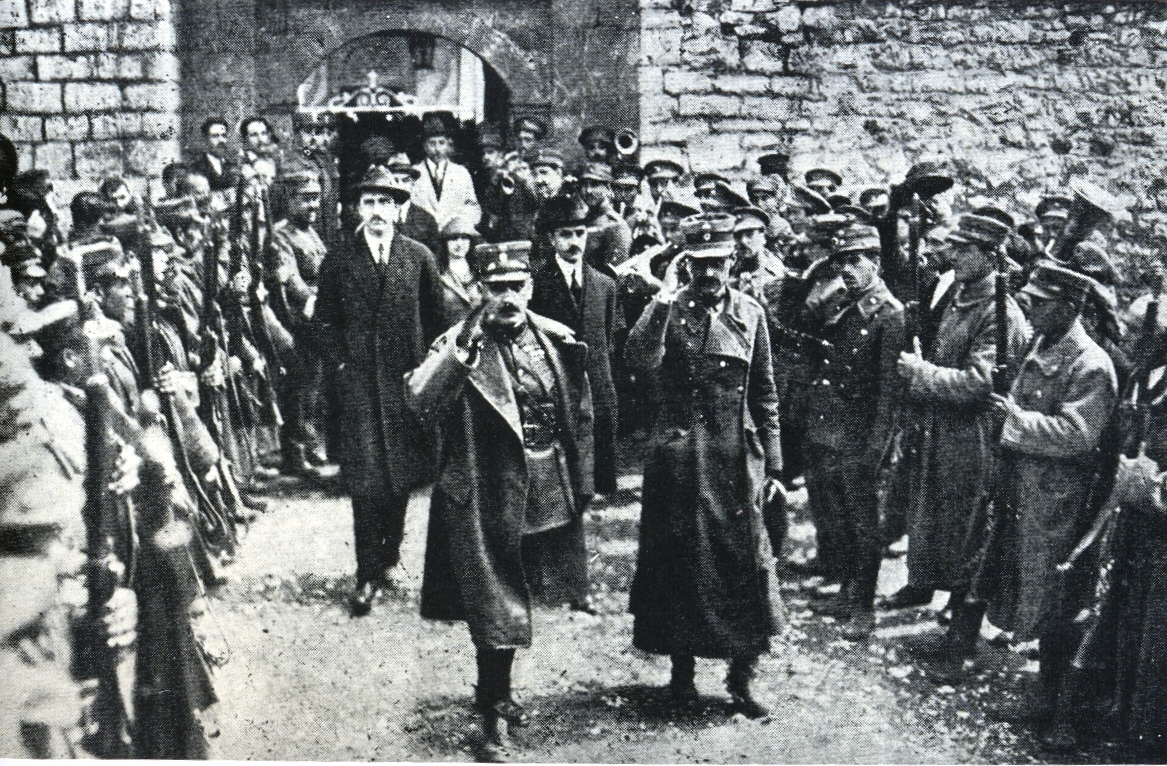
The leaders of the September 1922 Revolution

Following the February Revolution in Russia, however, the Tsar's support for his cousin was removed, and Constantine was forced to leave the country, without actually abdicating in June 1917. His second son Alexander became king, while the remaining royal family and the most prominent royalists followed into exile. Venizelos now led a superficially united Greece into the war on the Allied side, but underneath the surface, the division of Greek society into Venizelists and anti-Venizelists, the so-called National Schism, became more entrenched.

With the end of the war in November 1918, the moribund Ottoman Empire was ready to be carved up amongst the victors, and Greece now expected the Allied Powers to deliver on their promises. In no small measure through the diplomatic efforts of Venizelos, Greece secured Western Thrace in the Treaty of Neuilly in November 1919 and Eastern Thrace and a zone around Smyrna in western Anatolia (already under Greek administration since May 1919) in the Treaty of Sèvres of August 1920. The future of Constantinople was left to be determined. But at the same time, a nationalist movement had arisen in Turkey, led by Mustafa Kemal (later Kemal Atatürk), who set up a rival government in Ankara and was engaged in fighting the Greek army.

At this point, nevertheless, the fulfilment of the Megali Idea seemed near. Yet so deep was the rift in Greek society, that on his return to Greece, an assassination attempt was made on Venizelos by two former royalist officers. Venizelos' Liberal Party lost the elections called in November 1920, and in a referendum shortly after, the Greek people voted for the return of King Constantine from exile, following the sudden death of Alexander. The United Opposition, which had campaigned on the slogan of an end to the war in Anatolia, instead intensified it. However, the royalist restoration had dire consequences: many veteran Venizelist officers were dismissed or left the army, while Italy and France found the return of the hated Constantine a useful pretext for switching their support to Kemal. Finally, in August 1922, the Turkish army shattered the Greek front, and took Smyrna.

The Greek army evacuated not only Anatolia but also Eastern Thrace and the islands of Imbros and Tenedos (Treaty of Lausanne). A compulsory population exchange was agreed between the two countries, with over 1.5 million Christians and almost half a million Muslims being uprooted. This catastrophe marked the end of the Megali Idea, and left Greece financially exhausted, demoralised, and having to house and feed a proportionately huge number of refugees.

The catastrophe deepened the political crisis, with the returning army rising under Venizelist officers and forcing King Constantine to abdicate again, in September 1922, in favour of his firstborn son, George II. The "Revolutionary Committee", headed by Colonels Stylianos Gonatas (soon to become Prime Minister) and Nikolaos Plastiras engaged in a witch-hunt against the royalists, culminating in the "Trial of the Six". In October 1923, elections were called for December, which would form a National Assembly with powers to draft a new constitution. Following a failed royalist coup, the monarchist parties abstained, leading to a landslide for the Liberals and their allies. King George II was asked to leave the country, and on 25 March 1924, Alexandros Papanastasiou proclaimed the Second Hellenic Republic, ratified by plebiscite a month later.

=== Restoration of Monarchy and the 4th of August Regime ===
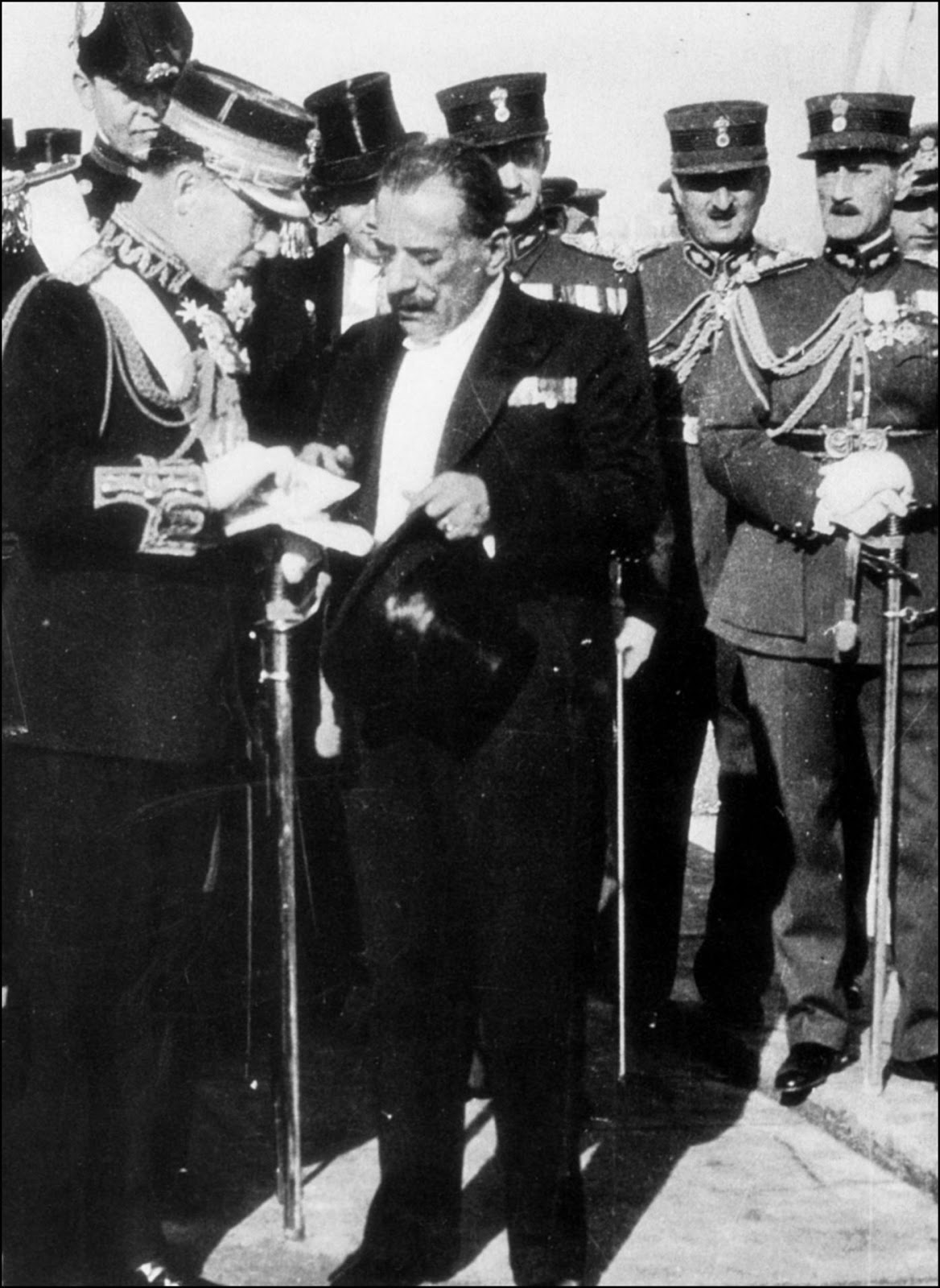
Kondylis with George II in 1935

On 10 October 1935, a few months after he suppressed a Venizelist Coup in March 1935, Georgios Kondylis, the former Venizelist stalwart, abolished the Republic in another coup and declared the monarchy restored. A rigged plebiscite confirmed the regime change (with 97.88% of votes), and King George II returned.

King George II immediately dismissed Kondylis and appointed Professor Konstantinos Demertzis as interim Prime Minister. Venizelos meanwhile, in exile, urged an end to the conflict over the monarchy given the threat to Greece from the rise of Fascist Italy. His successors as Liberal leader, Themistoklis Sophoulis and Georgios Papandreou, agreed, and the restoration of the monarchy was accepted. The 1936 elections resulted in a hung parliament, with the Communists holding the balance. As no government could be formed, Demertzis continued. At the same time, a series of deaths left the Greek political scene in disarray: Kondylis died in February, Venizelos in March, Demertzis in April and Tsaldaris in May. The road was now clear for Ioannis Metaxas, who had succeeded Demertzis as interim Prime Minister.

Metaxas, a retired royalist general, believed that an authoritarian government was necessary to prevent social conflict and, especially, quell the rising power of the Communist Party of Greece. On 4 August 1936, with the king's support, he suspended parliament and established the 4th of August Regime. The Communists were suppressed and the Liberal leaders went into internal exile. Metaxas' regime promoted various concepts such as the "Third Hellenic Civilization", the Roman salute, a national youth organisation, and introduced measures to gain popular support, such as the Greek Social Insurance Institute (IKA), still the biggest social security institution in Greece.

Despite these efforts, the regime lacked a broad popular base or a mass movement supporting it. The Greek people were generally apathetic, without actively opposing Metaxas. Metaxas also improved the country's defences in preparation for the forthcoming European war, constructing, among other defensive measures, the "Metaxas Line". Despite his aping of Fascism and the strong economic ties with resurgent Nazi Germany, Metaxas followed a policy of neutrality, given Greece's traditionally strong ties to Britain, reinforced by King George II's personal Anglophilia. In April 1939, the Italian threat suddenly loomed closer, as Italy annexed Albania, whereupon Britain publicly guaranteed Greece's borders. Thus, when World War II broke out in September 1939, Greece remained neutral.

=== World War II ===
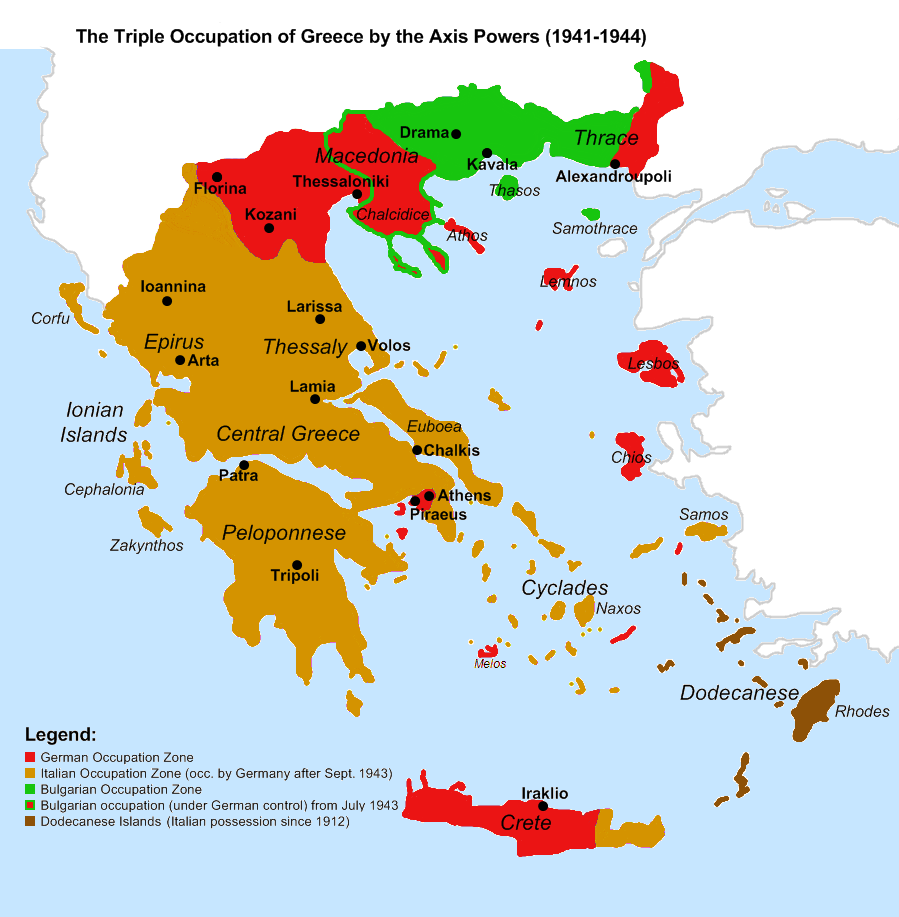
The three occupation zones. Italian German territory annexed by Bulgaria The Italian zone was taken over by the Germans in September 1943

Despite this declared neutrality, Greece became a target for Mussolini's expansionist policies. Provocations against Greece included the sinking of the light cruiser Elli on 15 August 1940. Italian troops crossed the border on 28 October 1940, beginning the Greco-Italian War, but were stopped by a determined Greek defence, and ultimately driven back into Albania. Metaxas died suddenly in January 1941. His death raised hopes of liberalisation of his regime and the restoration of parliamentary rule, but King George quashed these hopes when he retained the regime's machinery in place.

In the meantime, Adolf Hitler was reluctantly forced to divert German troops to rescue Mussolini from defeat and attacked Greece through Yugoslavia and Bulgaria on 6 April 1941. Despite British assistance, by the end of May, the Germans had overrun most of the country. The king and the government escaped to Crete, where they stayed until the end of the Battle of Crete. They then transferred to Egypt, where a government in exile was established.

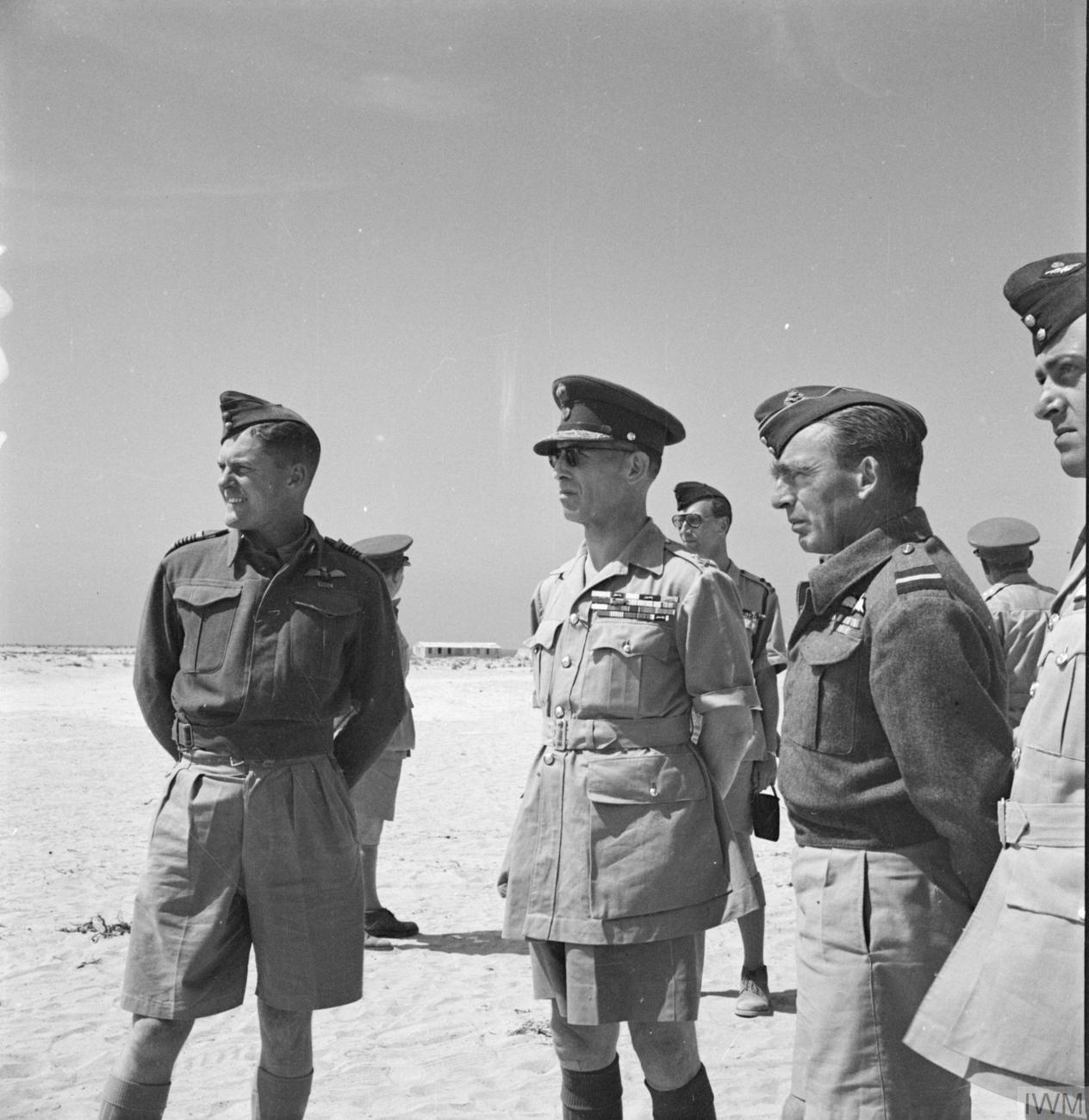
George II during his visit to a Greek fighter station, 1944

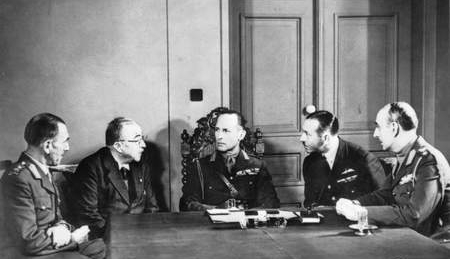
Ioannis Metaxas with King George II and Alexandros Papagos during a meeting of the Anglo-Greek War Council

The occupied country was divided into three zones (German, Italian, and Bulgarian), and in Athens, a puppet regime was established. The members were either conservatives or nationalists with fascist leanings. The three quisling prime ministers were Georgios Tsolakoglou, the general who had signed the armistice with the Wehrmacht, Konstantinos Logothetopoulos, and Ioannis Rallis, who took office when the German defeat was inevitable and aimed primarily at combating the left-wing Resistance movement. To this end, he created the collaborationist Security Battalions.

Greece suffered terrible privations during World War II, as the Germans appropriated most of the country's agricultural production and prevented its fishing fleets from operating. As a result, and because a British blockade initially hindered foreign relief efforts, a wide-scale famine resulted, when hundreds of thousands perished, especially in the winter of 1941–1942. In the mountains of the Greek mainland, in the meantime, several resistance movements sprang up, and by mid-1943, the Axis forces controlled only the main towns and the connecting roads, while a "Free Greece" was set up in the mountains.

The largest resistance group, the National Liberation Front (EAM), was controlled by the Communists, as was (ELAS) led by Aris Velouchiotis and a civil war soon broke out between it and non-Communist groups such as the National Republican Greek League (EDES) in those areas liberated from the Germans. The exiled government in Cairo was only intermittently in touch with the resistance movement and exercised virtually no influence in the occupied country.

Part of this was due to the unpopularity of the King George II in Greece itself, but despite efforts by Greek politicians, British support ensured his retention at the head of the Cairo government. As the German defeat drew nearer, the various Greek political factions convened in Lebanon in May 1944, under British auspices, and formed a government of national unity, under George Papandreou, in which EAM was represented by six ministers.

=== Greek Civil War (1946–1949) ===
German forces withdrew on 12 October 1944, and the government in exile returned to Athens. After the German withdrawal, the EAM-ELAS guerrilla army effectively controlled most of Greece, but its leaders were reluctant to take control of the country, as they knew that Stalin had agreed that Greece would be in the British sphere of influence after the war. Tensions between the British-backed Papandreou and EAM, especially over the issue of disarmament of the various armed groups, leading to the resignation of the latter's ministers from the government.

A few days later, on 3 December 1944, a large-scale pro-EAM demonstration in Athens ended in violence and ushered an intense, house-to-house struggle with British and monarchist forces (the Dekemvriana). After three weeks, the Communists were defeated: the Varkiza agreement ended the conflict and disarmed ELAS, and an unstable coalition government was formed. The anti-EAM backlash grew into a full-scale "White Terror", which exacerbated tensions.

The Communists boycotted the March 1946 elections, and on the same day, fighting broke out again. By the end of 1946, the Communist Democratic Army of Greece had been formed, pitted against the governmental National Army, which was backed first by Britain and after 1947 by the United States.

Communist successes in 1947–1948 enabled them to move freely over much of mainland Greece, but with the extensive reorganisation, the deportation of rural populations and American material support, the National Army was slowly able to regain control over most of the countryside. In 1949, the insurgents suffered a major blow, as Yugoslavia closed its borders following the split between Marshal Josip Broz Tito with the Soviet Union.

In August 1949, the National Army under Marshal Alexander Papagos launched an offensive that forced the remaining insurgents to surrender or flee across the northern border into the territory of Greece's northern Communist neighbours. The civil war resulted in 100,000 killed and caused catastrophic economic disruption. Moreover, at least 25,000 Greeks were either voluntarily or forcibly evacuated to Eastern bloc countries, while 700,000 became displaced persons inside the country. Many more emigrated to Australia and other countries.

The postwar settlement saw Greece's territorial expansion, which had begun in 1832, come to an end. The 1947 Treaty of Paris required Italy to hand over the Dodecanese islands to Greece. These were the last majority-Greek-speaking areas to be united with the Greek state, apart from Cyprus, which was a British possession until it became independent in 1960. Greece's ethnic homogeneity was increased by the postwar expulsion of 25,000 Albanians from Epirus (see Cham Albanians).

The only significant remaining minorities are the Muslims in Western Thrace (about 100,000) and a small Slavic-speaking minority in the north. Greek nationalists continued to claim southern Albania (which they called Northern Epirus), home of a significant Greek population (about 3%–12% in the whole of Albania), and the Turkish-held islands of Imvros and Tenedos, where there were smaller Greek minorities.

=== Postwar Greece and the fall of the monarchy (1950–1973) ===
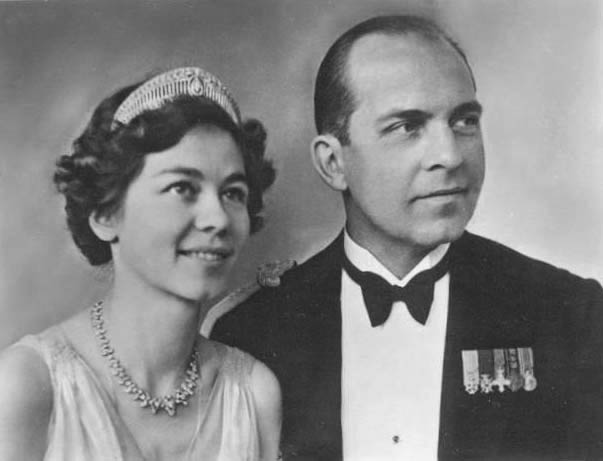
Paul of Greece with his wife Frederica

Royal standard (1936–1973)

During the Civil war (1946–1949) but even more after that, the parties in the parliament were divided into three political concentrations. The political formation Right-Centre-Left, given the exacerbation of political animosity that had preceded dividing the country in the 1940s, tended to turn the concurrence of parties into ideological positions.

At the beginning of the 1950s, the forces of the Centre (EPEK) succeeded in gaining the power and under the leadership of the aged general Nikolaos Plastiras they governed for about half a four-year term. These were a series of governments having limited manoeuvre ability and inadequate influence in the political arena. This government, as well as those that followed, was constantly under the American auspices. The defeat of EPEK in the elections of 1952, apart from increasing the repressive measures that concerned the defeated of the Civil war, also marked the end of the general political position that it represented, namely political consensus and social reconciliation.

The left, which had been ostracised from the political life of the country, found a way of expression through the constitution of EDA (United Democratic Left) in 1951, which turned out to be a significant pole, yet steadily excluded from the decision making centres. After the disbandment of the centre as an autonomous political institution, EDA practically expanded its electoral influence to a significant part of the EAM-based Centre-Left.

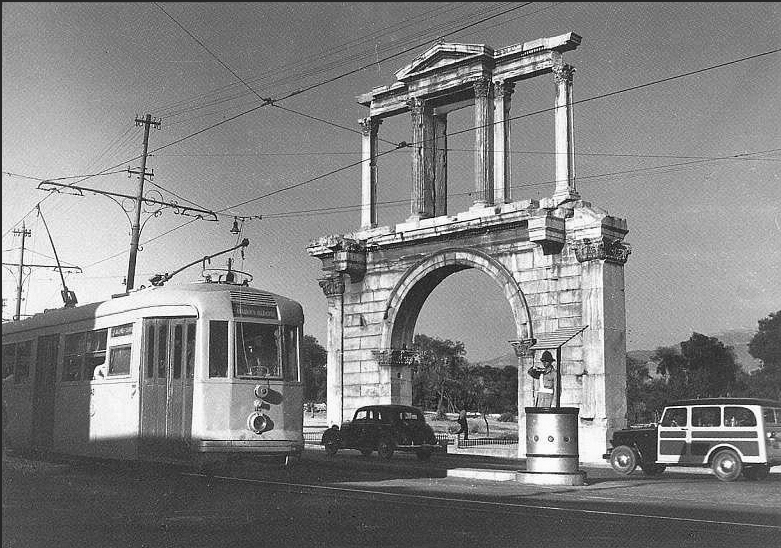
Athens in the 1950s

The developmental strategy adopted by the country was embodied in centrally organised five-year plans; yet their orientation was indistinct. The average annual emigration, which absorbed the excess workforce and contributed to extremely high growth rates, exceeded the annual natural increase in population. The influx of large amounts of foreign private capital was being facilitated, and consumption was expanded. These, associated with the rise of tourism, the expansion of shipping activity and with the migrant remittances, had a positive effect on the balance of payments.

The peak of development was registered principally in manufacture, mainly in the textile and chemical industry and in the sector of metallurgy, the growth rate of which tended to reach 11% during 1965–1970. The other large branch where distinct economic and social consequences were brought about, was that of construction. Consideration, a Greek invention, favoured the creation of a class of small-medium contractors on the one hand and settled the housing system and property status on the other.

During that decade, youth came forth in society as a distinct social power with the autonomous presence (creation of a new culture in music, fashion, etc.) and displaying dynamism in the assertion of their social rights. The independence granted to Cyprus, which was mined from the very beginning, constituted the primary focus of young activist mobilisations, along with struggles aiming at reforms in education, which were provisionally realised to a certain extent through the educational reform of 1964. The country reckoned on and was influenced by Europe – usually behind time – and by the current trends like never before. Thus, in a sense, the imposition of the military junta conflicted with the social and cultural occurrences.

The country descended into a prolonged political crisis, and elections were scheduled for late April 1967. On 21 April 1967 however, a group of right-wing colonels led by Colonel Georgios Papadopoulos seized power in a coup d'état establishing the Regime of the Colonels. Civil liberties were suppressed, special military courts were established, and political parties were dissolved. Several thousand suspected communists and political opponents were imprisoned or exiled to remote Greek islands. Alleged US support for the junta is claimed to be the cause of rising anti-Americanism in Greece during and following the junta's harsh rule.

However, the junta's early years also saw a marked upturn in the economy, with increased foreign investment and large-scale infrastructure works. The junta was widely condemned abroad, but inside the country, discontent began to increase only after 1970, when the economy slowed down. Even the armed forces, the regime's foundation, were not immune. In May 1973, a planned coup by the Hellenic Navy was narrowly suppressed but led to the mutiny of the Velos, whose officers sought political asylum in Italy. In response, junta leader Papadopoulos attempted to steer the regime towards a controlled democratisation, abolishing the monarchy and declaring himself President of the Republic.

== Politics ==
=== Greek Monarchical Constitutions ===
The first constitution of the Kingdom of Greece was the Greek Constitution of 1844. On 3 September 1843, the military garrison of Athens, with the help of citizens, rebelled and demanded from King Otto the concession of a constitution.

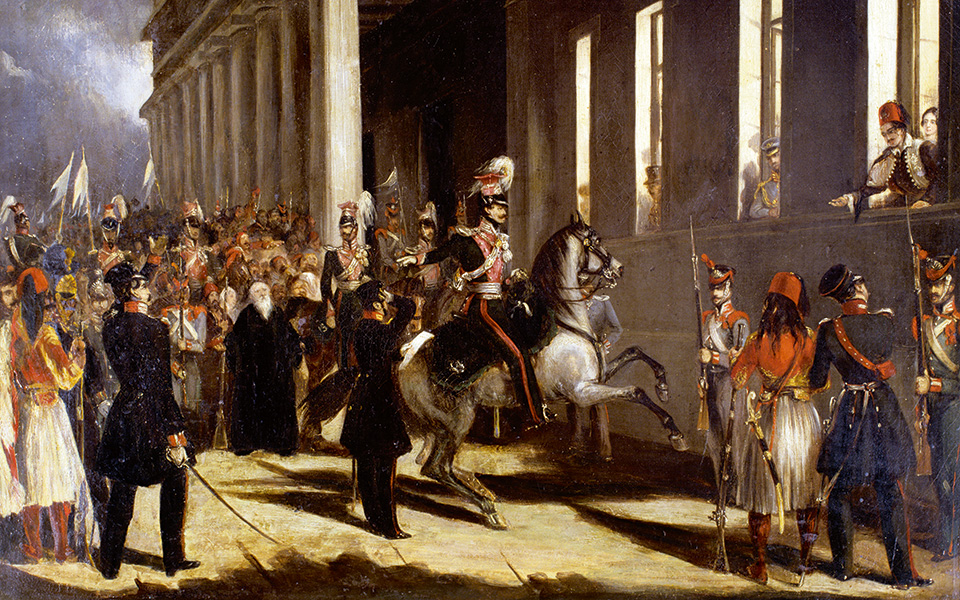
Dimitrios Kallergis on horseback during the 3 September 1843 Revolution

The Constitution that was proclaimed in March 1844 came from the workings of the "Third of September National Assembly of the Hellenes in Athens" and was a Constitutional Pact, in other words, a contract between the monarch and the Nation. This Constitution re-established the Constitutional Monarchy and was based on the French Constitution of 1830 and the Belgian Constitution of 1831.

Its main provisions were the following: It established the principle of monarchical sovereignty, as the monarch was the decisive power of the State; the legislative power was to be exercised by the King – who also had the right to ratify the laws – by the Parliament, and by the Senate. The members of the Parliament could be no less than 80, and they were elected for a three-year term by universal suffrage. The senators were appointed for life by the King, and their number was set at 27, although that figure could increase should the need arise and per the monarch's will, but it could not exceed half the number of the members of Parliament.

The ministers' responsibility for the King's actions is established, who also appoints and removes them. Justice stems from the King and is dispensed in his name by the judges he himself appoints.

Lastly, this Assembly voted on the electoral law of 18 March 1844, which was the first European law to provide, in essence, for universal male suffrage.

The Second National Assembly of the Hellenes took place in Athens (1863–1864) and dealt both with the election of a new sovereign as well as with the drafting of a new Constitution, thereby implementing the transition from constitutional monarchy to a Crowned republic.

Following the refusal of Prince Alfred of the United Kingdom (who was elected by an overwhelming majority in the first referendum of the country in November 1862) to accept the crown of the Greek kingdom, the government offered the crown to the Danish prince George Christian Willem of the House of Schleswig-Holstein-Sonderburg-Glucksburg, who was crowned constitutional King of Greece under the name "George I, King of the Hellenes" (Note: King Constantine II left Greece after the 13th December Countermovement. However, the 21st of April Regime officially abolished the monarchy in June 1973.).

The Constitution of 1864 was drafted following the models of the Constitutions of Belgium of 1831 and of Denmark of 1849, and established in clear terms the principle of popular sovereignty since the only legislative body with reversionary powers was now the Parliament. Furthermore, Article 31 reiterated that all the powers stemmed from the Nation and were to be exercised as provided by the Constitution, while Article 44 established the principle of accountability, taking into consideration that the King only possessed the powers that were bestowed on him by the Constitution and by the laws applying the same.

The Assembly chose the system of a single-chamber Parliament (Vouli) with a four-year term and hence abolished the Senate, which many accused of being a tool in the hands of the monarchy. Direct, secret, and universal elections were adopted as the manner to elect the MPs, while elections were to be held simultaneously throughout the entire nation.

Additionally, article 71 introduced a conflict between being an MP and a salaried public employee or mayor at the same time, but not with serving as an army officer.

The Constitution reiterated various clauses found in the Constitution of 1844, such as that the king appoints and dismisses the ministers and that the latter are responsible for the person of the monarch, but it also allowed for the Parliament to establish "examination committees". Moreover, the king preserved the right to convoke the Parliament in ordinary as well as in extraordinary sessions, and to dissolve it at his discretion, provided, however, that the dissolution decree was also countersigned by the Cabinet.

The Constitution repeated verbatim the clause of article 24 of the Constitution of 1844, according to which "The King appoints and removes his Ministers". This phrase insinuated that the ministers were practically subordinate to the monarch, and thereby answered not only to the Parliament but to him as well. Moreover, nowhere was it stated in the Constitution that the king was obliged to appoint the Cabinet in conformity with the will of the majority in Parliament. This was, however, the interpretation that the modernising political forces of the land upheld, invoking the principle of popular sovereignty and the spirit of the Parliamentary regime.

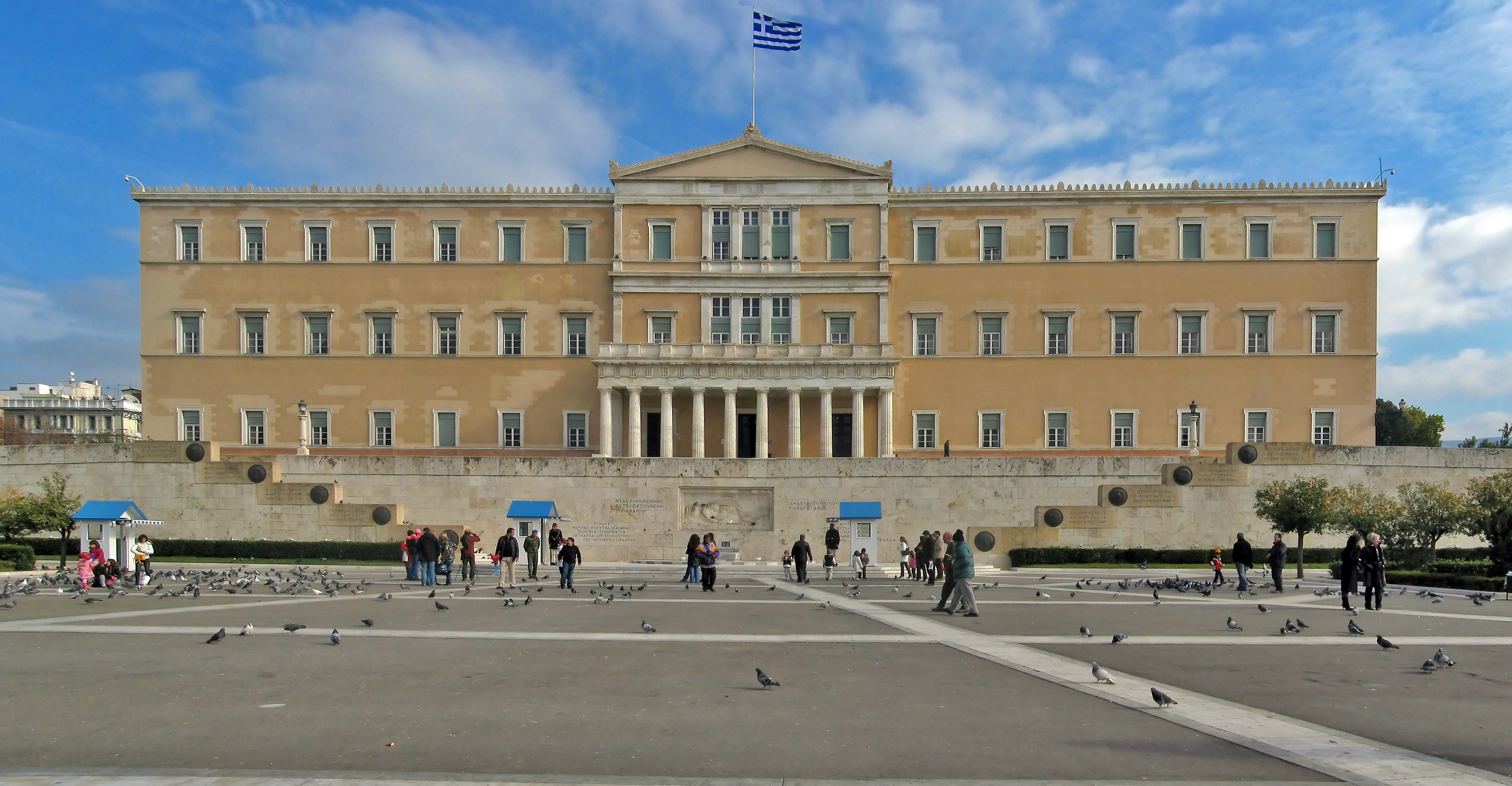
The Old Royal Palace in Athens has hosted the Hellenic Parliament since 1929.

They finally succeeded in imposing it through the principle of "manifest confidence" of the Parliament, which was expressed in 1875 by Charilaos Trikoupis and which, that same year, in his Crown Speech, King George I expressly pledged to uphold: "I demand as a prerequisite, of all that I call beside me to assist me in governing the country, to possess the manifest confidence and trust of the majority of the Nation's representatives. Furthermore, I accept this approval to stem from the Parliament, as without it the harmonious functioning of the polity would be impossible".

The establishment of the principle of "manifest confidence" towards the end of the first decade of the crowned democracy, contributed towards the disappearance of a constitutional practice which, in many ways, reiterated the negative experiences of the period of the reign of King Otto. Indeed, from 1864 through 1875 numerous elections of dubious validity had taken place, while, additionally and most importantly, there was an active involvement of the Throne in political affairs through the appointment of governments enjoying a minority in Parliament, or through the forced resignation of majority governments, when their political views clashed with those of the crown.

The Greek Constitution of 1911 was a major step forward in the constitutional history of Greece. Following the rise to power of Eleftherios Venizelos after the Goudi revolt in 1909, Venizelos set about attempting to reform the state. The main outcome of this was a major revision to the Greek Constitution of 1864.

The most noteworthy amendments to the Constitution of 1864 concerning the protection of human rights, were the more effective protection of personal security, equality in tax burdens, of the right to assemble and of the inviolability of the domicile. Furthermore, the Constitution facilitated expropriation to allocate property to landless farmers, while simultaneously judicially protecting property rights.

Other important changes included the institution of an Electoral Court for the settlement of election disputes stemming from the parliamentary elections, the addition of new conflicts for MPs, the re-establishment of the State Council as the highest administrative court (which, however, was constituted and operated only under the Constitution of 1927), the improvement of the protection of judicial independence and the establishment of the non-removability of public employees. Finally, for the first time, the Constitution provided for mandatory and free education for all, and declared Katharevousa (i.e., archaising "purified" Greek) as the "official language of the Nation".

== Economy ==
=== 19th century ===
Greece entered its period of new-won independence in a somewhat different state than Serbia, which shared many of the post-independence economic problems such as land reform. In 1833, the Greeks took control of a countryside devastated by war, depopulated in places and hampered by primitive agriculture and marginal soils. Just as in Serbia, communications were bad, presenting obstacles for any wider foreign commerce. Even by the late 19th-century Agricultural development had not advanced as significantly as had been intended as William Moffet, the US Consul in Athens explained:

agriculture is here in the most undeveloped condition. Even in the immediate neighbourhood of Athens, it is common to find the wooden plough and the rude mattock which were in use 2,000 years ago. Fields are ploughed up or scratched over, and crops replanted season after season until the exhausted soil will bear no more. Fertilizers are not used to any appreciable extent, and the farm implements are of the very rudest description. Irrigation is in use in some districts, and, as far as I can ascertain, the methods in use can be readily learned by a study of the practices of the ancient Egyptians. Greece has olives and grapes in abundance, and of quality not excelled, but Greek olive oil and Greek wine will not bear transportation.

Greece had a strong wealthy commercial class of rural notables and island shipowners, and access to 9,000,000 acres (36,000 km^{2}) of land expropriated from Muslim owners who had been driven off during the War of Independence.

==== Land reform ====
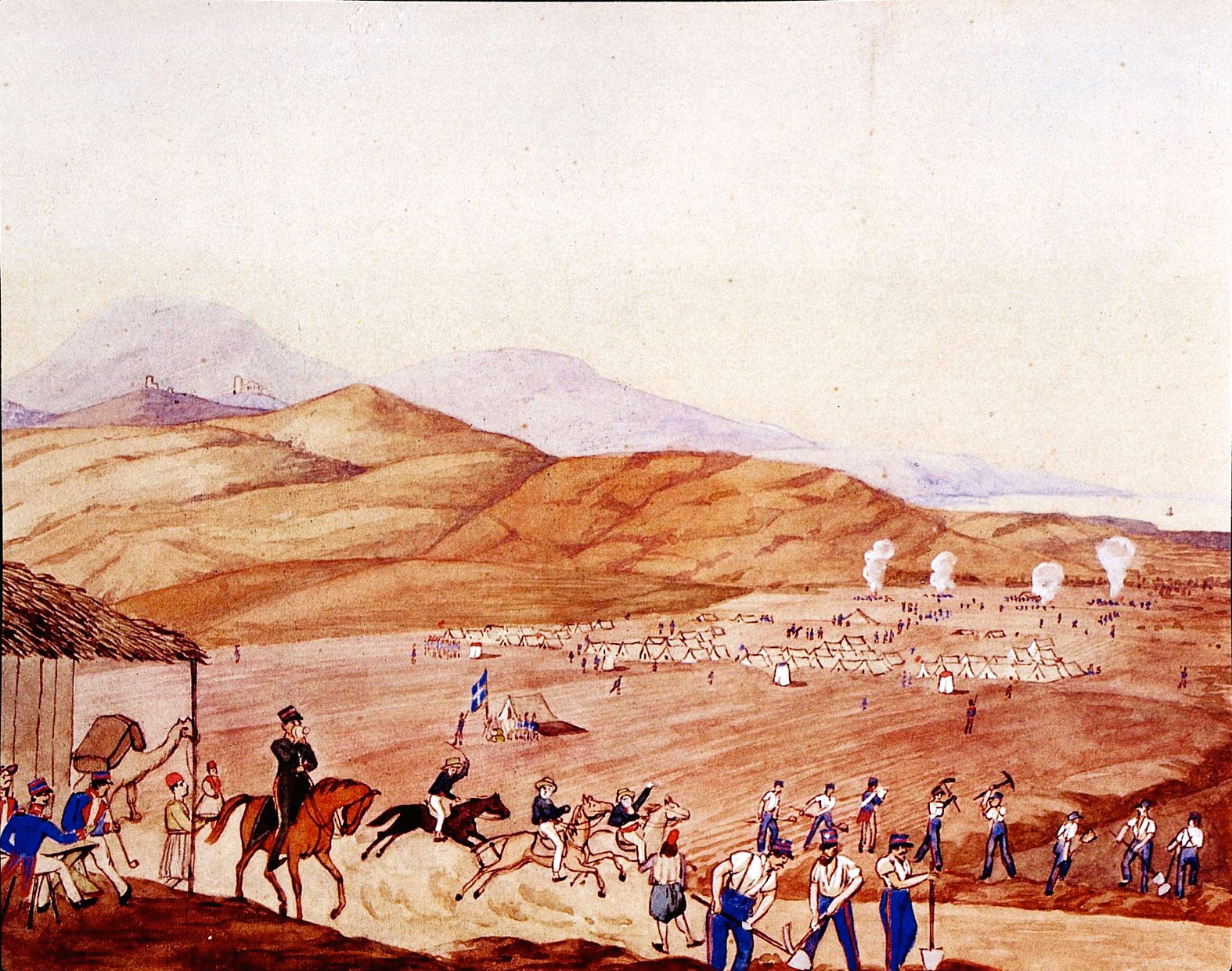
Construction of the Athens-Piraeus highway by army engineers, 1835–36

Land reform represented the first real test for the new Greek kingdom. The new Greek government deliberately adopted land reforms intended to create a class of free peasants. The "Law for the Dotation of Greek Families" of 1835 extended 2,000 drachmas credit to every family, to be used to buy a 12-acre (4.9 ha) farm at auction under a low-cost loan plan. The country was full of displaced refugees and empty Ottoman estates.

By a series of land reforms over several decades, the government distributed this confiscated land among veterans and the poor, so that by 1870 most Greek peasant families owned about 20 acres (8.1 ha). These farms were too small for prosperity, but the land reform signalled the goal of a society in which Greeks were equals and could support themselves, instead of working for hire on the estates of the rich. The class basis of rivalry between Greek factions was thereby reduced.

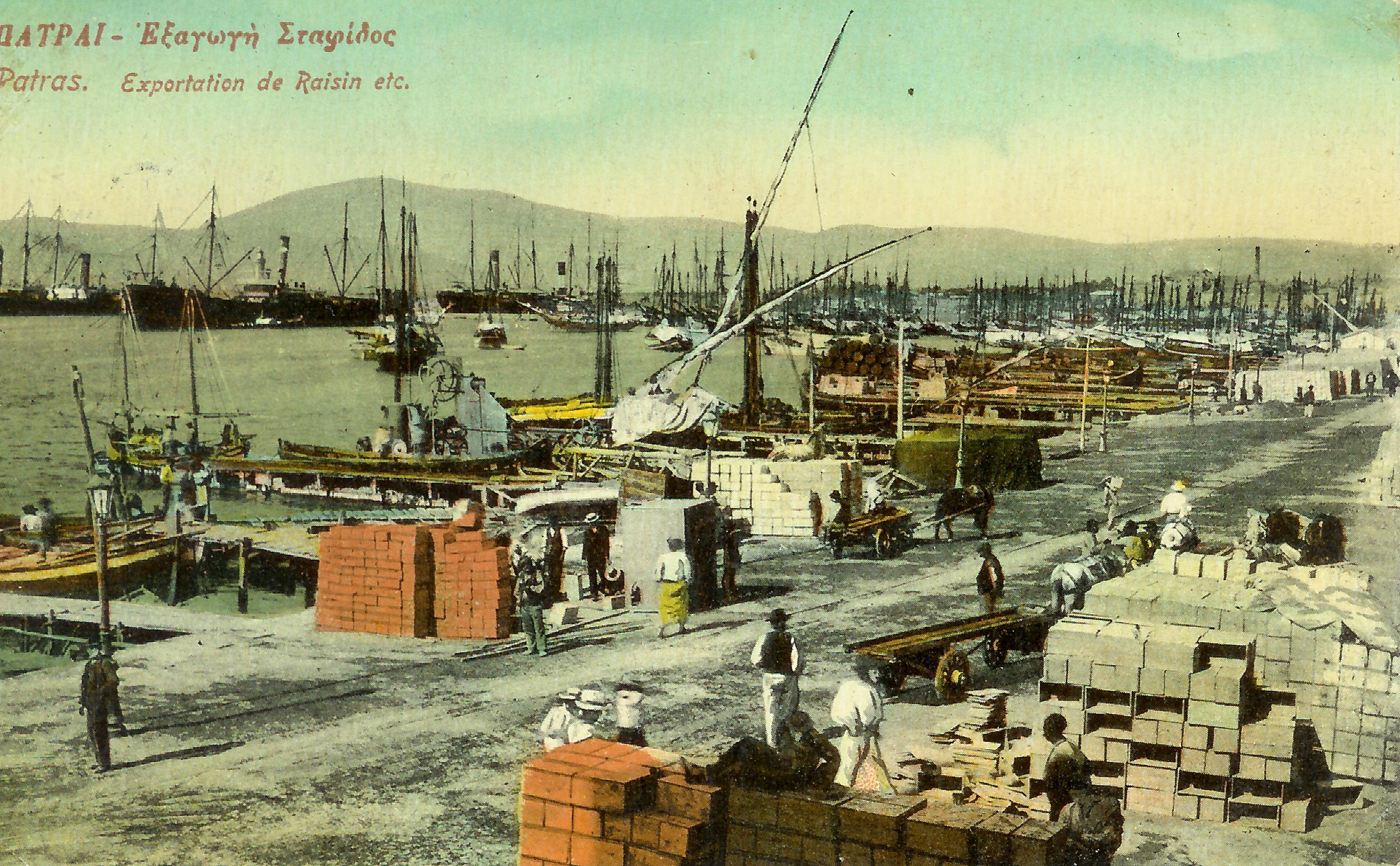
Raisin (dried grapes) exporting in the port of Patras, late 19th century

=== 20th century ===
==== Industry ====
The series of wars between 1912 and 1922 provided a catalyst for Greek industry, with a number of industries such as textiles; ammunition and boot-making springing up to supply the military. After the wars most of these industries were converted to civilian uses. Greek refugees from Asia Minor, the most famous of which was Aristotle Onassis who hails from Smyrna (modern Izmir) also had a tremendous impact on the evolution of Greek industry and banking. Greeks held 45% of the capital in the Ottoman Empire before 1914, and many of the refugees expelled from Turkey had funds and skills which they quickly put to use in Greece.

These refugees from Asia Minor also led to rapid growth of urban areas in Greece, as the vast majority of them settled in urban centres such as Athens and Thessaloniki. The 1920 census reported that 36.3% of Greeks lived in urban or semi-urban areas, while the 1928 census reported that 45.6% of Greeks lived in urban or semi-urban areas. It has been argued by many Greek economists that these refugees kept Greek industry competitive during the 1920s, as the surplus of labour kept real wages very low. Although this thesis makes economic sense, it is sheer speculation as there is no reliable data on wages and prices in Greece during this period.

Greek industry went into decline slightly before the country joined the EC, and this trend continued. Although worker productivity rose significantly in Greece, labour costs increased too fast for the Greek manufacturing industry to remain competitive in Europe. There was also very little modernisation in Greek industries due to a lack of financing.

==== Dichotomisation of the drachma ====
Budgetary problems caused the Greek government to begin an interesting economic experiment, the dichotomisation of the drachma. Unable to secure any more loans from abroad to finance the war with Turkey, in 1922 Finance Minister Protopapadakis declared that each drachma was essentially to be cut in half. Half of the value of the drachma would be kept by the owner, and the other half would be surrendered to the government in exchange for a 20-year 6.5% loan. World War II led to these loans not being repaid, but even if the war had not occurred, it is doubtful that the Greek government would have been able to repay such enormous debts to its own populace. This strategy led to large revenues for the Greek state, and inflation effects were minimal.

This strategy was repeated again in 1926 due to the government's inability to pay back loans incurred from the decade of war and the resettlement of the refugees. Deflation occurred after this dichotomisation of the drachma, as well as a rise in interest rates. These policies had the effect of causing much of the populace to lose faith in their government, and investment decreased as people began to stop holding their assets in cash which had become unstable, and began holding real goods.

==== Great Depression ====
As the reverberations of the Great Depression hit Greece in 1932. The Bank of Greece tried to adopt deflationary policies to stave off the crises that were going on in other countries, but these largely failed. For a brief period, the drachma was pegged to the US dollar, but this was unsustainable given the country's large trade deficit, and the only long-term effects of this were Greece's foreign exchange reserves being almost totally wiped out in 1932. Remittances from abroad declined sharply and the value of the drachma began to plummet from 77 drachmas to the dollar in March 1931 to 111 drachmas to the dollar in April 1931.

This has been particularly harmful to Greece as the country relied on imports from the UK, France and the Middle East for many necessities. Greece went off the gold standard in April 1932 and declared a moratorium on all interest payments. The country also adopted protectionist policies such as import quotas, which some European countries did during the time period. Protectionist policies coupled with a weak drachma, stifling imports, allowed Greek industry to expand during the Great Depression. In 1939 Greek Industrial output was 179% that of 1928.

These industries were for the most part "built on sand" as one report of the Bank of Greece put it, as without massive protection they would not have been able to survive. Despite the global depression, Greece managed to suffer comparatively little, averaging an average growth rate of 3.5% from 1932 to 1939. The fascist regime of Ioannis Metaxas took over the Greek government in 1936, and economic growth was strong in the years leading up to the Second World War.

==== Shipping ====
One industry in which Greece had major success was the shipping industry. Greece's geography has made the country a major player in maritime affairs from antiquity, and Greece has a strong modern tradition dating from the Treaty of Küçük Kaynarca in 1774, which allowed Greek ships to escape Ottoman domination by registering under the Russian flag. The treaty prompted a number of Greek commercial houses to be set up across the Mediterranean and the Black Sea, and after independence, Greece's shipping industry was one of the few bright spots in the modern Greek economy during the 19th century.

After both world wars the Greek shipping industry was hit hard by the decline in global trade, but both times it revived quickly. The Greek government aided the revival of the Greek shipping industry with insurance promises following the Second World War. Tycoons such as Aristotle Onassis also aided in strengthening the Greek merchant fleet, and shipping has remained one of the few sectors in which Greece still excels.

==== Tourism ====
It was during the 60s and 70s that tourism, which now accounts for 30% of Greece's GDP, began to become a major earner of foreign exchange. This was initially opposed by many in the Greek government, as it was seen as a volatile source of income in the event of any political shocks. It was also opposed by many conservatives and by the Church as bad for the country's morals. Despite concerns, tourism grew significantly in Greece and was encouraged by successive governments as it was a straightforward source of badly needed foreign exchange revenues.

==== Agriculture ====
The resolution of the Greco-Turkish War and the Treaty of Lausanne led to a population exchange between Greece and Turkey, which also had massive ramifications on the agricultural sector in Greece. The tsifliks were abolished, and Greek refugees from Asia Minor settled on these abandoned and partitioned estates. In 1920 only 4% of land holdings were of sizes more than 24 acres (9.7 ha), and only .3% of these were in large estates of more than 123 acres (0.50 km^{2}). This pattern of small scale farm ownership has continued to the present day, with the small number of larger farms declining slightly.

==== Post-World War II ====
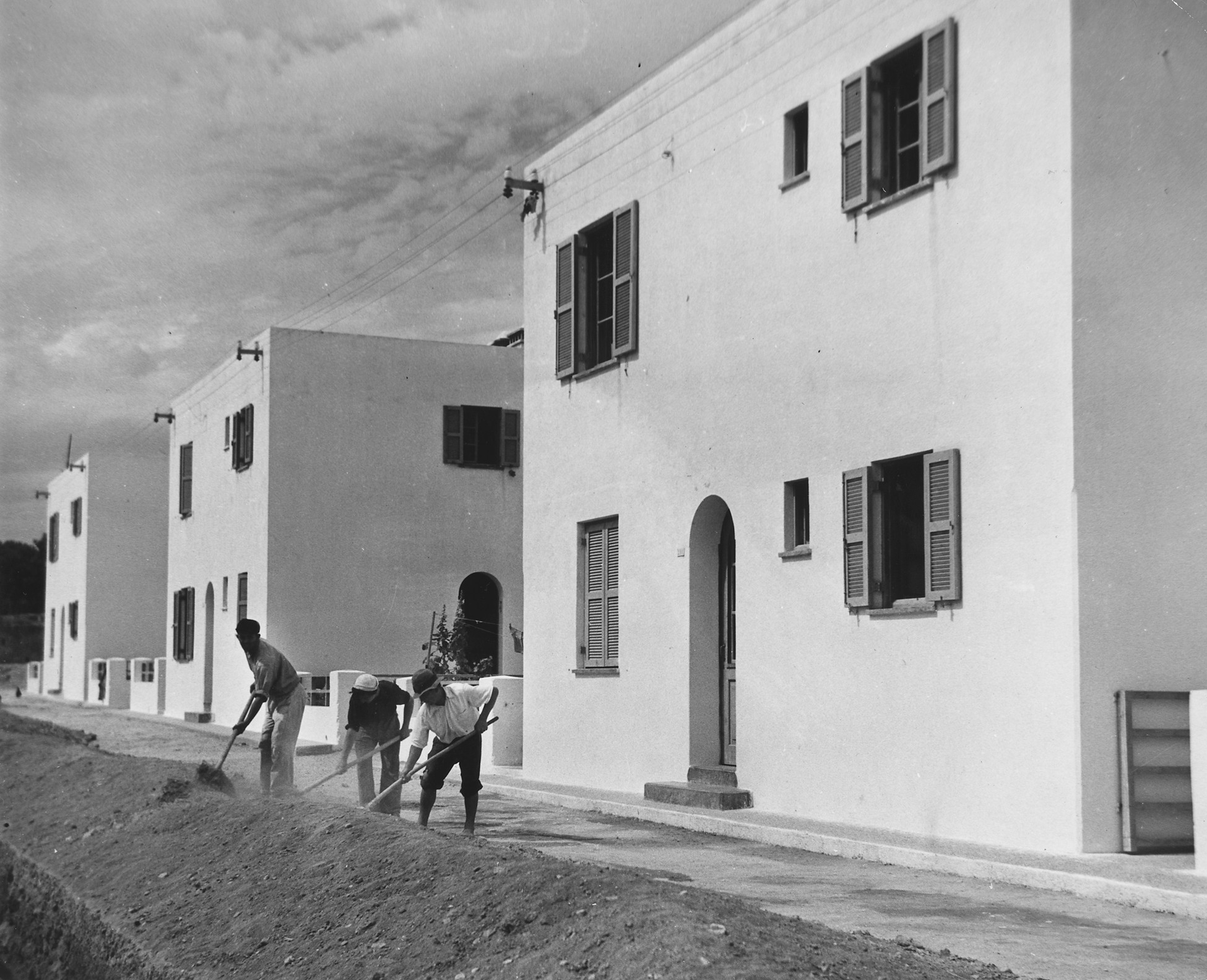
Workmen grading the street in front of new housing constructed with the help of Marshall Plan funds

Greece suffered comparatively much more than most Western European countries during the Second World War due to a number of factors. Heavy resistance led to immense German reprisals against civilians. Greece was also dependent on food imports, and a British naval blockade coupled with transfers of agricultural produce to Germany resulted in famine. It is estimated that the Greek population declined by 7% during the Second World War. Greece experienced hyperinflation during the war. In 1943, prices were 34,864% higher compared to those of 1940; in 1944, prices were 163,910,000,000% higher compared to the 1940 prices. The Greek hyperinflation is the fifth worst in economic history, after Hungary's following World War II, Zimbabwe's in the late 2000s, Yugoslavia's in the middle 1990s, and Germany's following World War I. This was compounded by the country's disastrous civil war from 1944 to 1950.

Greek economy was in a deplorable state in 1950 (after the end of the Civil War), with its relative position dramatically affected. In that year Greece had a per capita GDP of $1,951, which was well below that of countries like Portugal ($2,132), Poland ($2,480), and even Mexico ($2,085). Greece's per capita GDP was comparable to that of countries like Bulgaria ($1,651), Japan ($1,873), or Morocco ($1,611).

Over the past 50 years, Greece has grown much faster than most of the countries that had comparable per capita GDP's in 1950, reaching a per capita GDP of $30,603 today. This can be compared to the previously stated countries, $17,900 in Portugal, $12,000 in Poland, $9,600 in Mexico, $8,200 in Bulgaria and $4,200 in Morocco. Greece's growth averaged 7% between 1950 and 1973, a rate second only to Japan's during the same period. In 1950 Greece was ranked 28th in the world for per capita GDP, while in 1970 it was ranked 20th.

== Culture ==
=== Visual arts ===
Modern Greek art began to be developed around the time of Romanticism. Greek artists absorbed many elements from their European colleagues, resulting in the culmination of the distinctive style of Greek Romantic art, inspired by revolutionary ideals as well as the country's geography and history. The most important artistic movement of Greek painting in the 19th century was academic realism (Greek academic art of the 19th century), often called in Greece "the Munich School" because of the strong influence from the Royal Academy of Fine Arts, Munich (German: Münchner Akademie der Bildenden Künste), where many Greek artists trained. The Munich School painted the same sort of scenes in the same sort of style as Western European academic painters in several countries and did not attempt to incorporate Byzantine stylistic elements into their work. The creation of romantic art in Greece can be explained mainly due to the particular relationships that were created between recently liberated Greece (1830) and Bavaria during King Otto's years.

Notable sculptors of the new Greek Kingdom were Leonidas Drosis whose major work was the extensive neo-classical architectural ornament at the Academy of Athens, Lazaros Sochos, Georgios Vitalis, Dimitrios Filippotis, Ioannis Kossos, Yannoulis Chalepas, Georgios Bonanos and Lazaros Fytalis.

=== Theatre ===
The modern Greek theatre was born after the Greek independence, in the early 19th century, and initially was influenced by the Heptanesean theatre and melodrama, such as the Italian opera. The Nobile Teatro di San Giacomo di Corfù was the first theatre and opera house of modern Greece and the place where the first Greek opera, Spyridon Xyndas' The Parliamentary Candidate (based on an exclusively Greek libretto) was performed. During the late 19th and early 20th century, the Athenian theatre scene was dominated by revues, musical comedies, operettas and nocturnes and notable playwrights included Spyridon Samaras, Dionysios Lavrangas, Theophrastos Sakellaridis and others.

The National Theatre of Greece was founded in 1880. Notable playwrights of the modern Greek theatre include Gregorios Xenopoulos, Nikos Kazantzakis, Pantelis Horn, Alekos Sakellarios and Iakovos Kambanelis, while notable actors include Cybele Andrianou, Marika Kotopouli, Aimilios Veakis, Orestis Makris, Katina Paxinou, Manos Katrakis and Dimitris Horn. Significant directors include Dimitris Rontiris, Alexis Minotis and Karolos Koun.

=== Cinema ===
Cinema first appeared in Greece in 1896 at the Summer Olympics, but the first actual cine-theatre was opened in 1907. In 1914 the Asty Films Company was founded and the production of long films begun. Golfo (Γκόλφω), a well known traditional love story, is the first Greek long movie, although there were several minor productions such as newscasts before this. In 1931 Orestis Laskos directed Daphnis and Chloe (Δάφνις και Χλόη), contained the first nude scene in the history of European cinema; it was also the first Greek movie which was played abroad. In 1944 Katina Paxinou was honoured with the Best Supporting Actress Academy Award for For Whom the Bell Tolls.

The 1950s and early 1960s are considered by many as the Greek Golden age of Cinema. Directors and actors of this era were recognised as important historical figures in Greece and some gained international acclaim: Michael Cacoyannis, Alekos Sakellarios, Melina Mercouri, Nikos Tsiforos, Iakovos Kambanelis, Katina Paxinou, Nikos Koundouros, Ellie Lambeti, Irene Papas etc. More than sixty films per year were made, with the majority having film noir elements.

Notable films were Η κάλπικη λίρα (1955 directed by Giorgos Tzavellas), Πικρό Ψωμί (1951, directed by Grigoris Grigoriou), O Drakos (1956 directed by Nikos Koundouros), Stella (1955 directed by Cacoyannis and written by Kampanellis). Cacoyannis also directed Zorba the Greek with Anthony Quinn which received Best Director, Best Adapted Screenplay and Best Film nominations. Finos Film also contributed to this period with movies such as Λατέρνα, Φτώχεια και Φιλότιμο, Η Θεία από το Σικάγο, Το ξύλο βγήκε από τον Παράδεισο and many more.

== The royal family ==
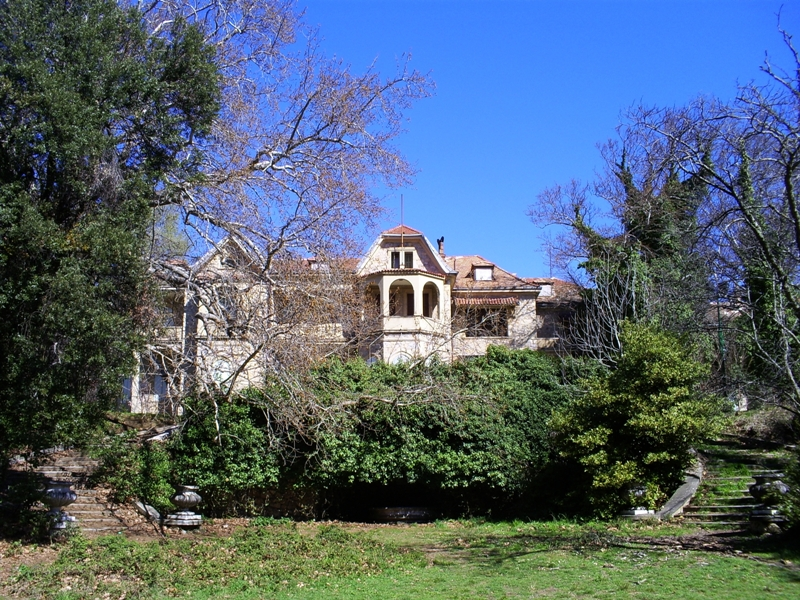
The abandoned Tatoi Palace

Most members of the former royal family are living abroad; Constantine II and his wife, Anne-Marie and unmarried children resided in London until 2013 when they returned to Greece to reside permanently. As male-line descendants of King Christian IX of Denmark the members of the dynasty bear the title of Prince or Princess of Denmark; this is why they are traditionally referred to as Princes or Princesses of Greece and Denmark.

== List of kings of Greece ==
Name	Portrait	Reign
Otto		6 February 1833 – 23 October 1862
George I		30 March 1863 – 18 March 1913
Constantine I (1st reign)		18 March 1913 – 11 June 1917
Alexander		11 June 1917 – 25 October 1920
Constantine I (2nd reign)		19 December 1920 – 27 September 1922
George II (1st reign)		27 September 1922 – 25 March 1924
Second Hellenic Republic
George II (2nd reign)		3 November 1935 – 1 April 1947
Paul		1 April 1947 – 6 March 1964
Constantine II		6 March 1964 – 1 June 1973
Third Hellenic Republic

== See also ==
- Byzantines
- Romioi
- Coat of arms of Greece
- Greek royal family
- History of modern Greece
- List of heads of state of Greece
- Monarchy of Greece
- Investiture of Greek Sovereigns
