= Bible translations into Greek =

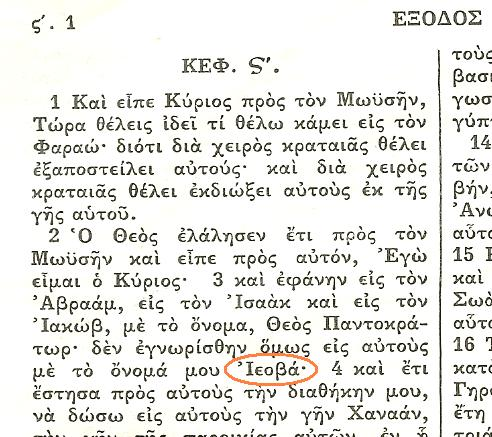
The Holy Bible in Modern Greek translated by Neophytus Vamvas (Νεόφυτος Βάμβας)

While the Old Testament portion of the Bible was written in Hebrew and Aramaic, the New Testament was originally written in Koine Greek. The Greek language, however, has several different dialects or denominations. This required several different translations done by several different individuals and groups of people. These translations can be categorized into translations done before and after 1500 AD.

== Before AD 1500 ==
The first known translation of the Bible into Greek is called the Septuagint (LXX; 3rd–1st centuries BC). The LXX was written in Koine Greek. It contains the Hebrew Bible translated from Hebrew and Aramaic. It also includes several other documents which are considered to have differing levels of authority by various Christian churches. (Note: While all the material that is considered authoritative by Jews and by Eastern Orthodox, Roman Catholic and Protestant Christians is contained in the LXX, not all the content of the LXX is considered authoritative by most of these groups. The LXX contains more material than the Jewish Bible. The Jewish Bible is equivalent to the Old Testament protocanon of Eastern Orthodox, Roman Catholic and Protestant Christian churches and is identical in content to the Old Testament used by Protestants. However Eastern Orthodox and Roman Catholic churches include additional books in their Old Testament. These are called deuterocanonical, as opposed to protocanonical. Eastern Orthodox churches uses the whole LXX. The Roman Catholic church includes more material in their Old Testament than Protestants and less than the Eastern Orthodox churches. For more detail, refer to the following Wikipedia Articles: Old Testament, Deuterocanonical books and Biblical apocrypha. Refer especially to the discussion about the significance of the terms "canonical", "inspired by God" and "Anagignoskomena" (Ἀναγιγνωσκόμενα "readable, worthy to be read") in Deuterocanonical books#In Catholism and Deuterocanonical books#In Eastern Orthodoxy.) Some of these other documents are believed to have been written originally in Greek.

The LXX contains the oldest existing translation of Holy Scripture into any language. It was widely disseminated among ancient Hellenistic Jews, and was later used by Greek-speaking Christians for their Old Testament (see canon). The LXX is the source of the majority of quotations from the Old Testament by writers of the New Testament. It is studied along with Hebrew and Aramaic texts as an ancient source of information about the Old Testament.

Other early Greek translations of Hebrew Scripture that survive only in fragments are those of Aquila of Sinope (2nd century AD), Theodotion (2nd century AD), Symmachus (3rd century AD) and Fragments of the Samareitikon. There are also fragments of recensions toward the Hebrew text, such as the kaige revision.

== After AD 1500 ==
The New Testament part of the Christian Bible was originally written in Koine Greek, as most of the Church and scholars believe, and is therefore not a translation (notwithstanding that some reference material may have been from Aramaic). However, like other living languages, the Greek language has developed over time. Therefore, various translations have been completed over the centuries to make it easier for Greek speakers to understand Holy Scripture. Translations of the Old Testament, which is the other part of the Christian Bible, have been completed for similar reasons.

Agapius of Crete translated and published in 1543 the book of Psalms into modern Greek.

A Greek and polyglot edition of the Pentateuch commonly called "Constantinople Pentateuch" published in Constantinople in 1547 by Romaniote Jews has the Hebrew text in the middle of the page, the Aramaic on the base, with a Yevanic translation on one side and a Judaeo-Spanish translation on the other.

At the initiative of the pro-Reformed Patriarch Cyril Lucaris of Constantinople, Maximos of Gallipoli (or Kallioupolites, died 1633) translated a vernacular New Testament from 1629 which was printed at Geneva in 1638.

An edition of the New Testament into Modern Greek translated by Seraphim of Mytilene was edited in London in 1703 by the English Society for the Propagation of the Gospel in Foreign Parts. This translation was formally condemned in 1704 by the reigning Patriarch Gabriel III of Constantinople.

Frangiskos Soavios published in the year 1833 the Pentateuch and the Book of Joshua translated from the Hebrew Original into the Modern Greek Language.

A translation of the Bible (Old and New Testaments) in literary Katharevousa Greek (Καθαρεύουσα) by Neofytos Vamvas and his associates was first published in 1850 following nearly 20 years of work. Vamvas was dean and a professor of the University of Athens.

In 1901, Alexandros Pallis translated the Gospels into Modern Greek. This translation was known as Evangelika (Ευαγγελικά). There were riots in Athens when this translation was published in a newspaper. University students protested that he tried to sell the country to the Slavs and the Turks in order to break Greek religious and national unity. All translations were confiscated. The Holy Synod of the Greek Orthodox Church resolved that any translation of the Holy Gospels is profane and redundant, and also "contributes to scandalising the consciousness [of Greeks] and to the distortion of [the Gospels’] divine concepts and didactic messages".

In 1967 a team of academic staff of the University of Athens led by Basil (Vasilios) Vellas (Βασίλειος Βέλλας) translated the New Testament, with support from the Hellenic Bible Society. This translation was based on the Textus Receptus.

In 1993, the Jehovah's Witnesses circulated the translation of the "Greek Christian Scriptures" (New Testament) in modern Greek originating from the English edition, the New World Translation of the Holy Scriptures. Then, in 1997, they released the complete Holy Scriptures (Bible) in modern Greek, being "the result of some seven years of painstaking work.”

A revision of the Vamvas translation of the Bible into the modern vernacular (Demotic Greek) by Spyros (Spiros) Filos (Σπύρος Φίλος) was first published in 1994. This translation is used in the Greek Evangelical Church and is also recognized by the Orthodox Church.

Meanwhile, a team of 12 professors from the theological schools of the Universities of Athens and Thessaloniki had been working since the mid 1960s on another translation into the modern vernacular (Demotic Greek), with support from the Hellenic Bible Society. The translation of the New Testament, first published in 1985, was based on a critical text of the Koine Greek (κοινή) in which the New Testament was originally written. The translation of the Old Testament from Biblical Hebrew and Aramaic texts of the Jewish Scriptures was first published in 1997. This translation has the blessing and approval of the Holy Synod of the Church of Greece and is also used in Evangelical and Charismatic churches. It is known in English as "Today's Greek Version (TGV)".

In 2002, with the latest edition published in 2012, a New Testament translation by professor Nikolaos Sotiropoulos was published after he revisioned many hundreds of New Testament passages's interpretations in his 4 volumes work: «Ερμηνεία δύσκολων χωρίων της Γραφής» (Interpretation of difficult passages of the Bible). The new interpretations were judged positively and by professors including Ioannis Karmiris, also Ecumenical Patriarch of Constantinople Demetrios I as it published in the second volume of «Interpretation of difficult passages of the Bible», p. 12-28. The Bishop and professor Gortynos (Ieremias Foundas) described it as the best of all translations.

== See also ==
- Refer to a similar article on the Greek Wikipedia website Μεταφράσεις της Αγίας Γραφής for related information.
- Septuagint
- Hebrew Bible
- Old Testament
- New Testament
- Petros Vassiliadis
