= Marietta Pallis =

Greek-British ecologist (1882–1963)

- Pallis, ca. 1913
- Born: 1882; Bombay, India
- Died: 1963 (aged 80–81); Norwich, England
- Resting place: Double Headed Eagle Pool; 52°46′3.49″N 1°35′32.99″E
- Education: Liverpool University; Newnham College, Cambridge

Marietta Pallis (1882–1963) was a Greek-Briton ecologist and botanical artist. She is noted for research in aquatic botany, especially the Norfolk Broads and the Danube Delta as well as her creation of devotional landscapes.

== Biography ==
Pallis was born in Bombay, the daughter of the Greek poet and language reformer Alexandros Pallis. She moved to England when she was 12 and was brought up in Liverpool. Her younger brother was Marco Pallis, an author and mountaineer who wrote about Tibet. From 1904 to 1907 she studied botany at Liverpool University and attended Newnham College, Cambridge from 1910 to 1912. Pallis rented and later owned Long Gores farm, marshland property in Hickling, Norfolk.

Pallis studied the plav, floating reed systems of the Danube Delta; writing a paper for the journal of the Linnaean Society in 1916.

Following her father's death in 1935, Pallis travelled the eastern Mediterranean with her partner Phyllis Clark. She purchased the Long Gores property in 1935, planted specimens that she had acquired during her travel, and constructed a studio and garage. Pallis created in Long Gores a devotional symbolic Greek landscape, featuring the Double Headed Eagle Pool, a pool with an island shaped in the form of a crowned, double-headed Byzantine eagle featuring the Papal Cross, the cross of the patriarch of Constantinople and her own Greek initials. She continued to write on Greek history and created pamphlets in the late 1950s and early 1960s concerning what she referred to as "philosophical biology".

Pallis died in Norwich, aged 81. She is buried with her companion Clark near the Norfolk Broads on the central island of the Double Headed Eagle Pool. The tree Fraxinus pallisiae is named for her.

== Works ==
- 'The river-valleys of East Norfolk: their aquatic and fen formations', in A. G. Tansley, ed., Types of British vegetation, Cambridge University Press, 1911, pp. 214–45
- 'On the causes of the salinity of the Broads of the River Thume', Geographical Journal, Vol. 27 (1911), pp. 284–91
- 'The structure and history of plav: the floating fens of the delta of the Danube', Journal of the Linnean Society: Botany, Vol. 43, No. 291 (1916), pp. 233–90
- The general aspects of the vegetation of Europe, 1939
- Tableaux in Greek history, 1952
- The impermeability of peat and the origin of the Norfolk Broads, 1956
- An attempt at a statement concerning a vital unit as shown by the reed in the Delta of the Danube, 1958
- The species unit, and archetypal, primeval and primitive vegetation, 1960
- The status of fen and the origin of the Norfolk Broads, 1961
- The species unit, Unit III, 1963
