= Maximos of Gallipoli =

Maximos of Gallipoli (Greek: Μάξιμος Καλλιπολίτης; Latin: Maximus Callipolites; died 1633) was an Orthodox monk who proceeded to the first translation of the New Testament into modern Greek after 1629. This was at the initiative of the reforming Patriarch Cyril Lucaris of Constantinople, who was later strangled. With the assistance of the Dutch ambassador to Constantinople it was printed at Geneva in 1638. Meletios Sirigos (1590–1664) vehemently opposed Maximos's translation.

Since Patriarch Lucaris had been strangled Maximos' New Testament was hardly used, the next would-be translator of the New Testament, the monk Seraphim, was exiled to Siberia. In the 19th Century the BFBS assisted the monk Neophytos Vamvas 1776-1866 to make his translation but again it was not made available. The nationalist Alexandros Pallis' translation, in the Acropolis newspaper, caused riots in 1901 in which 8 people died. The New Testament in modern Greek was finally allowed in 1924.
