= Alexandros Pallis =

Greek educational and language reformer (1851-1935)

- Αλέξανδρος Πάλλης
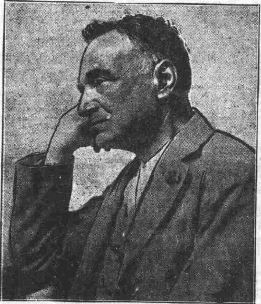
- Born: March 15, 1851; Piraeus
- Died: March 17, 1935 (aged 84); Liverpool
- Children: 3
- Writing career
- Language: Greek
- Genre: Translation
- Notable work: New Testament in Modern Greek

Alexandros Pallis (Greek: Αλέξανδρος Πάλλης; 15 March 1851, in Piraeus – 17 March 1935, in Liverpool) was a Greek educational and language reformer who translated the New Testament into Modern Greek. The publication, in the Akropolis newspaper, caused riots in Athens in 1901 in which 8 people died. His translation was subsequently published in Liverpool. The New Testament in Modern Greek was not legalised until 1924.

An Arvanite, Pallis had lived in Manchester from 1869 to 1875, in India from 1875 to 1894, then in Liverpool until his death. He subsidized from abroad much of the literary and scholarly output in demotic Greek from 1900 until the First World War, including his own translations of Homer.

Pallis considered it was "common sense" that John the Baptist was a vegetarian.

The politician and historian Alexandros Anastasios Pallis (1883–1975), the ecologist Marietta Pallis, and the Tibetan traveller Marco Pallis were his children.

== See also ==
- Neophytos Vamvas
- Maximos of Gallipoli
