= Investiture of the kings of Greece =

Investiture of the Kings of Greece
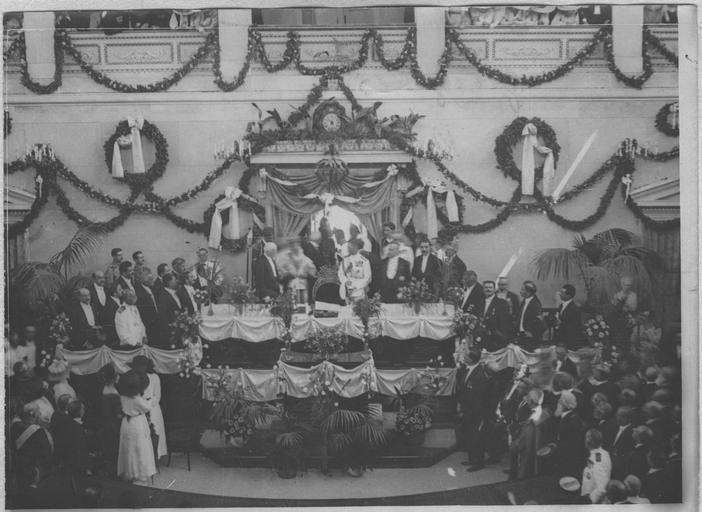
- Swearing-in of King Alexander I, August 4, 1917
- Type: Oath of office
- Started by: Kingdom of Greece

Following Greece's independence from the Ottoman Empire (1821–1829) and the establishment of a monarchy in 1832, a coronation ceremony based on Byzantine tradition was contemplated for the newly crowned sovereign, Otto I, and regalia were crafted for the planned event, which was scheduled to take place upon the king's coming of age (1835). However, as Otto was not prepared to renounce Catholicism and embrace Orthodoxy, the Church of Greece declined to crown him, and a more modest enthronement (Greek: ενθρόνιση) ceremony was subsequently arranged.

In 1844, the Greek constitutions introduced a more detailed structure for the investiture of the monarch. A double oath-taking ceremony (ορκωμοσία) was required to be conducted in the presence of the country's religious and political authorities. However, the political upheavals that plagued the Kingdom of Greece from its founding (1830) to its final dissolution (1974) complicated the organization of most royal investitures. For example, those of Otto I (1835) and George I (1863) took place after difficult royal elections, while Constantine I's (1913) occurred during a war and after a regicide: Alexander I's (1917) occurred during World War I, resulting from an Entente coup; George II's (1922) followed a military disaster and a revolution; while Paul I's (1947) took place during a civil war.

== Investiture ceremony ==
Despite the creation of regalia (comprising a crown, scepter, and sword) for the coronation of King Otto I, which was scheduled to take place at the Church of Saint Irene in Athens, no modern Greek king was ever crowned. The first two Greek monarchs were not members of the Orthodox faith, and the national church declined to crown them. The constitutions introduced after 1844 replaced the idea of a coronation with a simple proclamation, followed by an oath-taking ceremony before Parliament.

Under the stipulations outlined in Articles 36 and 42 of the 1844 Constitution (subsequently reiterated in Article 43 of the 1864 constitution, 1911, and 1952 constitutions), the monarch would be required to take the following oath in the presence of the government, the Holy Synod, the parliamentarians in the capital, and other senior authorities upon the death of his predecessor (or upon reaching majority).

I swear, in the name of the Holy, consubstantial, and indivisible Trinity, to protect the dominant religion of the Hellenes, to observe the Constitution and the laws of the Hellenic nation, and to maintain and defend the national independence and territorial integrity of Greece.

In accordance with Article 43 of the 1844 Constitution (and Article 49 of subsequent constitutions), the oath was repeated before Parliament within two months following the actual royal investiture.

== History ==
=== Investiture of Otto I (1835) ===
In accordance with the London Protocol of April 26, 1832, and the London Conference of May 7, 1832, the newly independent Greek state was transformed into a kingdom, (Note: Previously, the country had been transformed into a sovereign principality by the London Protocol of 1830.) with Prince Otto of Bavaria assuming the role of head of state. The date of Otto's majority was set for the day of his 20th birthday, and a Regency Council was established. Otto was formally proclaimed king, and the provisional government organized festivities in Argos in June to commemorate his birthday. Subsequently, three Greek deputies (Andreas Miaoulis, Kostas Botsaris, and Dimitrios Plapoutas) appeared before the Wittelsbach court in Munich on behalf of the Greek nation on October 15, 1832. They were received by their new sovereign at the Residenz Palace, where they swore an oath of loyalty to him in the presence of the Archimandrite of Munich.

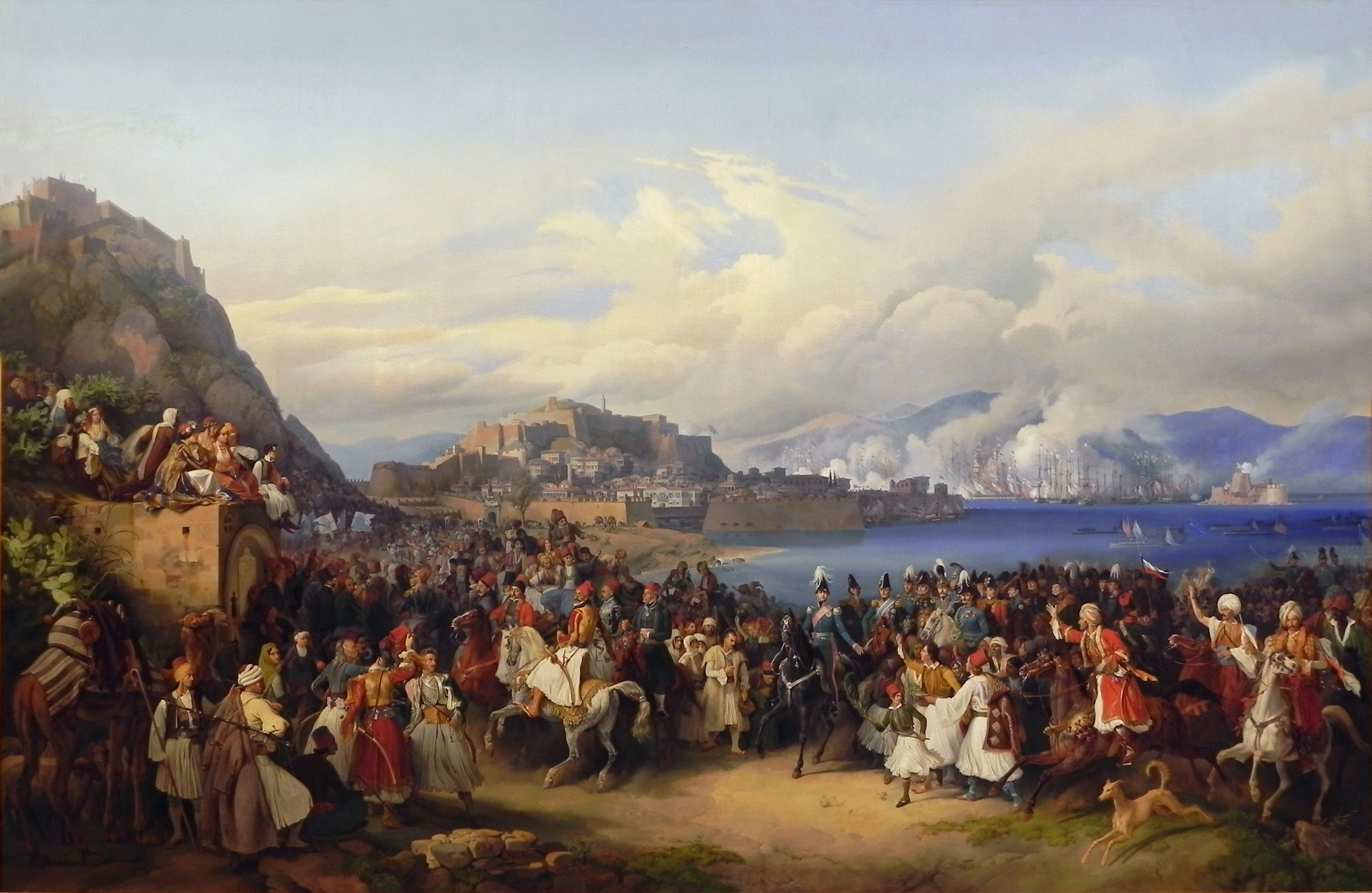
The Entry of King Otto of Greece into Nafplio. Painting by Peter von Hess, 1835.

Otto I and his Regency Council finally arrived in Nafplio on January 30, 1833, at 13:00. On the following day, the Greek government paid its respects to the sovereign and the regents. However, it was not until February 6 (January 25, Julian calendar) that they disembarked in Greece in a solemn ceremony. They were met with a triumphant welcome, amplified by the young king's declaration that he had been "called to the throne by the Great Mediating Powers but also by the free votes of the Greeks."

In the years that followed, research was conducted in European archives to rediscover the exact protocol for the coronation of Byzantine emperors. Sacred chrism was procured from Constantinople, and regalia, drawing inspiration from the art of the Byzantine Komnenos and Palaiologos dynasties, was commissioned from Munich for use in Otto's enthronement. The new regime sought to establish a sense of continuity between the Byzantine Empire and the Kingdom of Greece, a prospect met with opposition from Tsarist Russia (Note: Russia, since Ivan III (who adopted the title Tsar/Caesar), after the fall of Constantinople, viewed itself as the heir of the Byzantine Empire ("Third Rome"). See: Riasanovsky, Nicholas (1994). Histoire de la Russie : des origines à 1996 [History of Russia: from its origins to 1996] (in French). Éditions Robert Laffont. pp. 120–121. ISBN 978-2-221-08399-4.) and the Ottoman Empire.

In contrast, the Greeks anticipated that the young monarch would utilize the occasion of his coronation to espouse Eastern Orthodoxy. This was also the desire of the Russian court, which exerted diplomatic pressure on Otto to renounce Catholicism. Nevertheless, the king was disinclined to comply, citing the oppressive nature of Russia's interventions and the need to adhere to his conscience. Since the Greek Holy Synod was unwilling to crown a "schismatic", the coronation ceremony was postponed, and the celebrations accompanying Otto's enthronement were kept to a minimum, with no foreign delegations invited to Athens for the occasion. On June 1, 1835, Otto was declared of age, and he subsequently issued the following proclamation to his people:

I again promise to always protect the sacred religion of my subjects and to be the firm support of your Holy Church, to render justice to all, to faithfully respect the laws, to defend your freedoms, rights, and independence with divine assistance against any attempts. I will never cease to seek your happiness and glory. I will take the necessary precautions to amend and complete your laws. I will protect your properties with all my strength, your legitimate freedom, and consolidate it with institutions in harmony with the country's situation and the just wishes of the nation. In all circumstances, I will prove my deep respect for the Eastern Church, and in this regard, I will have special foresight concerning my descendants on the throne of Greece.

After the revolution of September 3, 1843, the Kingdom of Greece adopted a constitution, which Otto I swore to uphold during a ceremony on March 30, 1844. This was the inaugural occasion on which a Greek monarch took the oath before Parliament, which would henceforth be a requisite element of all subsequent royal investitures. After the event, a Te Deum was held at the Church of Saint Irene, a popular procession marched to the palace, and illuminations were organized throughout Athens.

=== Investiture of George I (1863) ===
In October 1862, a revolution overthrew King Otto. A few months later, on February 16, 1863, a decree from the provisional government proclaimed the entire Wittelsbach dynasty deposed. In light of these circumstances, the country's authorities and foreign chancelleries sought a new sovereign. In March 1863, the Great Powers reached an agreement on the candidacy of Prince William of Denmark, who was subsequently elected king by the Greek National Assembly under the name George I on March 30, 1863 (March 18, Julian calendar).

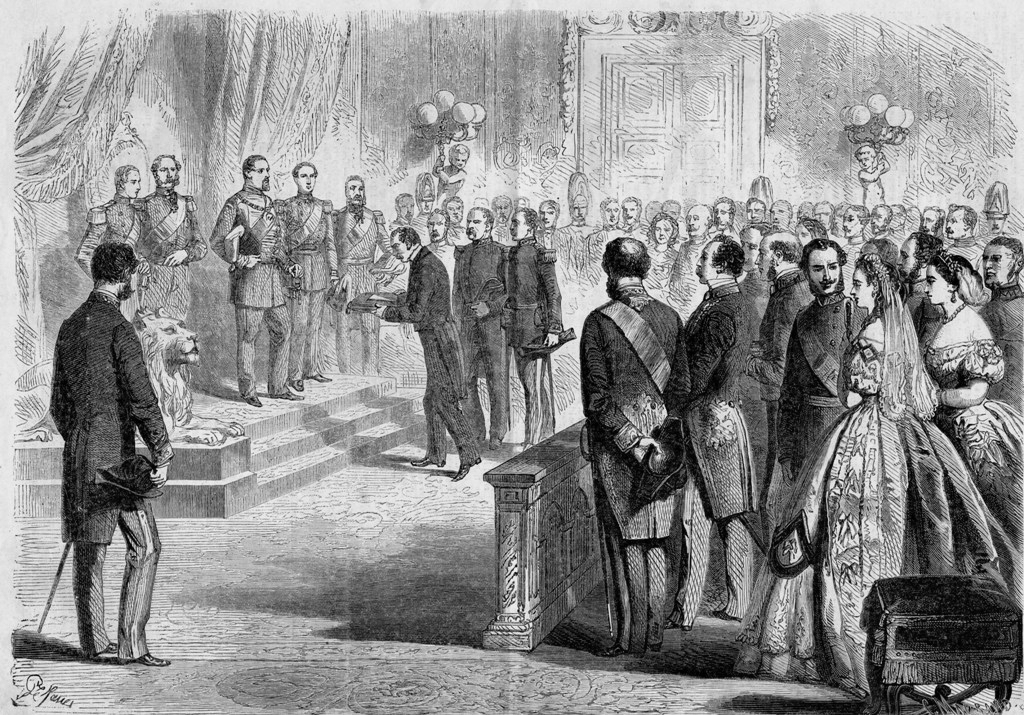
Thrasyvoulos Zaimis presenting, on a cushion, the decree recognizing the election of Prince William as King of the Hellenes to King Christian VII of Denmark. The Illustrated London News, 1863.

The London Conference of June 5, 1863, finally ratified the election, and the prince was proclaimed King of the Hellenes at Christiansborg Palace the following day at 11 a.m. He was attired in the uniform of a naval captain. In his naval uniform, William-George was led by King Frederick VII of Denmark before an assembly composed of members of the Danish royal family, Danish ministers and dignitaries, representatives of the "protecting powers", and a Greek delegation led by Admiral Konstantinos Kanaris. Following the reading of the decree by the Greek delegation, which announced the royal election, Frederick VII accepted the crown for his young cousin before decorating him with the Order of the Elephant. Subsequently, at 1 p.m., another ceremony took place, during which George I, accompanied only by his family, met with the Greek delegation, who offered their congratulations on his election. In response, the King of the Hellenes addressed the envoys with the following words:

My soul is filled with joy in receiving today the first greetings from the representatives of the Greek people, and I feel deep emotion in hearing them from the mouth of a man whose glorious name remains imperishably linked to the rebirth of Greece. I already understand the full responsibility of the task entrusted to me, I promise to devote the best forces of my life to it, and I count on the loyal and constant cooperation of the Greek people to achieve our common goal, the happiness of Greece. Born and raised in a country where legal order goes hand in hand with constitutional freedom, and which has thus achieved fruitful and beneficial development, I will carry with me to my new homeland a lesson that will never leave my memory and which will engrave in my heart, in indelible characters, the motto of the King of Denmark: "The love of my people is my strength."

Several months elapsed before George I took up residence in his newly acquired country. On October 30, 1863 (October 26 in the Julian calendar), he arrived in Piraeus at 10 a.m. and subsequently entered Athens an hour later in an open carriage drawn by six horses in the Daumont style and attired in a simple national guard general's uniform. The young king was greeted with great enthusiasm by a jubilant crowd that swarmed his carriage, kissing him and touching him. He passed through no fewer than three triumphal arches before reaching the cathedral. Subsequently, the monarch proceeded to the parliament for his inauguration, following the performance of a Te Deum. Despite his relatively young age (he had not yet reached the age of eighteen), George had been declared of age by the Hellenic Assembly on June 27, 1863. Consequently, as a fully entitled sovereign, he took the oath provided by the Constitution of 1844. The ceremony was relatively modest and took place in the absence of the diplomatic corps, which was officially informed in the evening that the sovereign had assumed his throne. In front of the assembled deputies, the king made the sign of the cross and kissed the Bible before reciting the ritual formula. Subsequently, he addressed the following proclamation to his newly acquired subjects:

I promise to dedicate my entire life to your happiness. Not only will I respect and scrupulously observe your laws and above all the Constitution, but I will revere and learn to love your institutions, your customs, your language, and everything you hold dear, just as I already love you. I will call upon the best and most capable men among you to gather around me, without regard for previous political differences. The goal of my ambition will be this: to make Greece, as far as it depends on me, a model kingdom in the East.

This marked the commencement of festivities that persisted for three days, during which the Acropolis of Athens and the Olympieion were illuminated in honor of the sovereign. One year later, after the enactment of a revised fundamental law by his subjects, the king reiterated his oath of loyalty before the Assembly for a final time on November 28, 1864.

=== Investiture of Constantine I (1913) ===
On March 18, 1913 (March 5 in the Julian calendar), while Greece was engaged in the First Balkan War against the Ottoman Empire, King George I was assassinated in Thessaloniki, a city that had recently been occupied by the Greek army. Upon learning of his father's death while in Ioannina, Constantine I addressed the army with the following words:

A sacrilegious attack on the sacred person of the King deprives us of our leader at a very critical moment for the entire Hellenic nation. I am now called by Providence to succeed my unforgettable father on this throne that he had so long honored and glorified. I bring this news to the knowledge of my army, to which I have devoted my entire life, and with which both unfortunate and successful wars have indissolubly bound me. I declare to them that, always leading them, I will never cease to dedicate my entire care to the armies of land and sea, whose glorious exploits have enlarged and glorified the homeland.

Simultaneously, in Athens, Prime Minister Eleftherios Venizelos addressed Parliament to proclaim the demise of George I and the ascension of Constantine I to the throne.

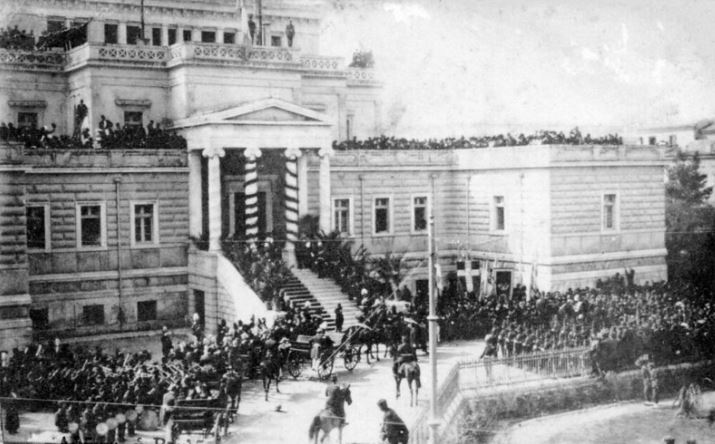
The royal procession to Parliament (1913).

Subsequently, the newly appointed monarch departed the Epirus front to return to Athens, where he arrived on March 20. In accordance with the Constitution of 1911, he took the oath before the Hellenic Parliament the following day. The French newspaper Le Gaulois reported the event as follows:

The ceremony was most impressive. From dawn, the crowd filled the streets, particularly near the Chamber and along the route the royal procession was to take. Long before the session opened, the galleries of the Chamber were packed, and all the deputies were in their places. At half-past ten, one hundred and one cannon shots announced that the King was leaving the palace. Throughout the route, enthusiastic ovations greeted the new sovereign, while drums and bugles played and military bands performed the national anthem. Followed by Queen Sophia, the Crown Prince George, and Prince Alexander, the King entered the Chamber. All the deputies stood in silence. The King wore the uniform of a generalissimo with black aiguillettes; the Queen was in deep mourning and wore the Grand Cordon of the Order of the Redeemer. In the royal box stood only the princesses Helen and Marie, also in deep mourning. Once the King and Queen were seated on the thrones prepared for them, the Metropolitan of Athens said a short prayer, then read the oath formula, which the King repeated after him, in a clear and calm voice. The oath-taking minutes were then signed by the King, the Metropolitan, and the ministers. As soon as the King pronounced the final words of the oath, a massive acclamation rose from all sides, from the benches of the deputies and the galleries: 'Long live King Constantine! Long live Greece! Long live the Hellenic army!' These cheers were renewed frenetically, enthusiastically, along the route of the procession, up to the return of the royal couple to the palace.

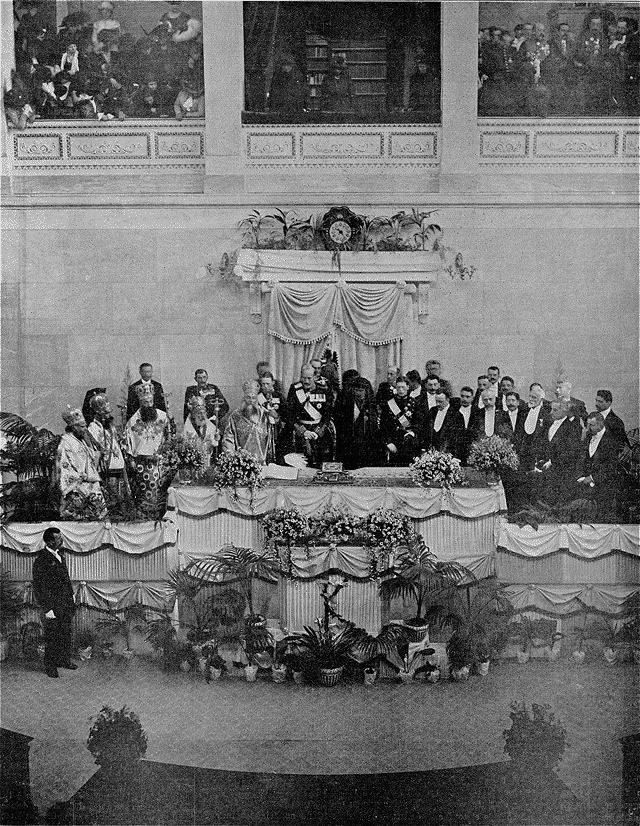
Swearing-in of Constantine I (1913).

The description provided by the newspaper L'Illustration was more concise and exhibited slight discrepancies from the previous account, particularly regarding the presence of other members of the royal family at the ceremony.

On the platform, raised at the back of the semicircle where the president of the assembly usually sits, behind and above the tribune, King Constantine took his place, having to his left Queen Sophia in deep mourning, to his right the Metropolitan of Athens. He was surrounded by his children, his brothers, all the ministers, and the high clergy. The ceremony was brief and of great simplicity. The Metropolitan read the oath formula. Then the King, with his hand extended over the Gospel, swore the oath. But the respectful enthusiasm shown to the King and Queen by the entire Parliament gave this solemnity a particularly moving character.

Prince Nicholas was still in Thessaloniki as military governor at the time of the inauguration, and Prince Andrew and his wife, Alice of Battenberg, were en route to Thessaloniki with the Dowager Queen Olga. (Note: The American School of Classical Studies at Athens indicates, in a caption of a postcard in its collections, that Queen Olga, dressed in full mourning attire, was present at the investiture of her son (See: "Η ορκωμοσία του Βασιλιά Κωνσταντίνου". American School of Classical Studies at Athens (in Greek). Archived from the original on January 15, 2024.) However, the bibliography related to the royal family does not support this view.) However, Prince Christopher was likely present at his brother's inauguration, as he was in the capital at the time. The same can be said of Princess Marie Bonaparte, who remained in Athens, while her husband elected to proceed to Thessaloniki.

In any case, two days after these events, Constantine I set sail for Thessaloniki intending to pay his respects to his father's body and subsequently return it to the capital for an official funeral. Subsequently, several months later, following the conclusion of the Balkan Wars, a rumor was disseminated in the French press. It was rumored that Greece planned to crown Constantine in May 1914 (the anniversary of Constantinople's capture by the Turks) and that the ceremony would be conducted in the Byzantine tradition. For the occasion, the crown and mantle of the Byzantine emperors John I Tzimiskes and Nikephoros II Phokas were to be brought to Athens from the Monastery of the Great Lavra on Mount Athos. However, this information was soon denied, and Constantine was never crowned.

=== Investiture of Alexander I (1917) ===
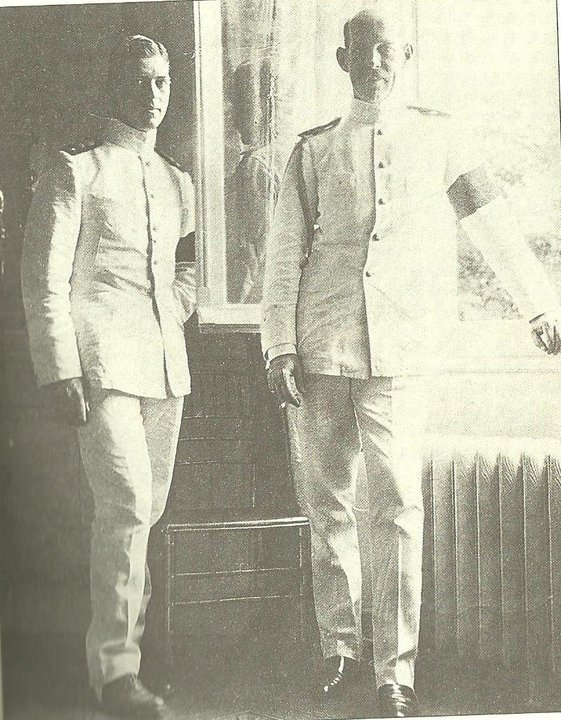
Kings Alexander I and Constantine I circa 1913.

During the First World War, Greece experienced a significant political divide, known as the National Schism, which pitted monarchists, who advocated for a neutral stance towards Imperial Germany, against Venizelists, who supported involvement in the conflict on the side of the Entente. Following a lengthy period of latent civil war, Charles Jonnart, the Allied High Commissioner in Greece, issued an order for King Constantine to relinquish his authority on June 10, 1917. In response to the imminent threat of an Allied landing at Piraeus, the king acquiesced to a request for exile, though without formally abdicating the throne. Given the Entente's reluctance to establish a republic in Greece, a member of Constantine's family was designated to succeed him. However, as Crown Prince George was perceived as equally aligned with Germany as his father, Prince Alexander, the second son of the king, was selected by Eleftherios Venizelos and the Allies as the new monarch.

The ceremony by which Alexander I ascended to the throne on June 10, 1917, was characterized by a pervasive atmosphere of solemnity and sorrow. In addition to Archbishop Theocletus I, who administered the oath to the new sovereign, only King Constantine I, Crown Prince George, and Prime Minister Alexandros Zaimis were present. The event was not accompanied by any festivities or displays of grandeur, and remained a closely guarded secret. (Note: Once the investiture was completed, the Prime Minister informed foreign legations as follows: "In the deepest sorrow, I inform you that following the actions of the three powers, His Majesty King of the Hellenes Constantine, yielding to political necessity, is leaving Greece with Her Majesty the Queen and the crown prince, leaving his son, Prince Alexander, on the throne. Today, the new king has taken a public oath." (Driault & Lhéritier 1926c, p. 310).) Alexander, then aged twenty-three, had a broken voice and teary eyes as he swore allegiance to the constitution. He was aware that he was about to assume a challenging role, as the Entente and Venizelists were opposed to the royal family and not inclined to obey him. He was particularly conscious of the fact that his reign was illegitimate. Indeed, neither his father nor his older brother had renounced their rights to the crown, and before the ceremony, Constantine had explained to his son at length that he was now the occupant of the throne but not the true monarch.

The speech of the new sovereign delivered to his people after the ceremony reflected this mindset:

At the moment when my august Father, making a supreme sacrifice to our beloved homeland, entrusts me with the heavy duties of the Hellenic throne, I express but one wish: that God, answering his prayers, will protect Greece and allow us to see it united and powerful once again. In my sorrow at being separated, under such critical circumstances, from my beloved father, my only consolation is to fulfill his sacred mandate. I will strive to carry it out with all my strength, following the path of his brilliant reign, with the help of the people, on whose love the Greek dynasty rests. I am convinced that, obeying my father's will, the people will contribute, through their obedience, to our joint efforts to lead our beloved homeland out of the terrible situation in which it finds itself.

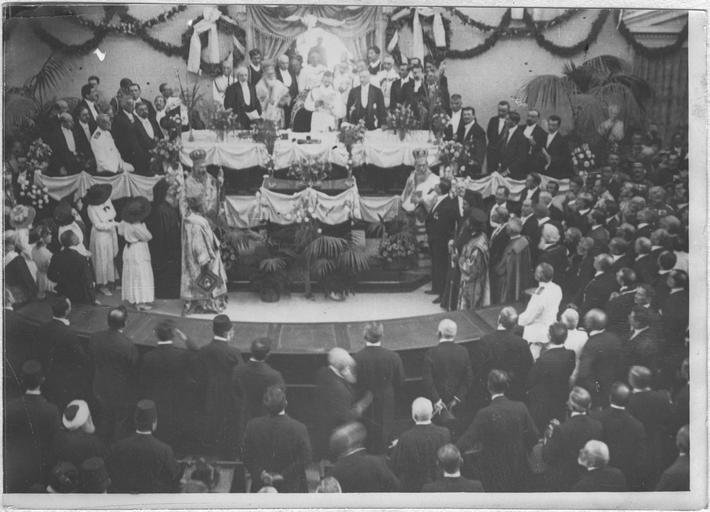
Swearing-in of King Alexander I, August 4, 1917

Following Constantine I's exile and Venizelos's return to assume leadership of the government, Alexander I's investiture was renewed within Parliament on August 4, 1917. The event was described in the August 6, 1917, edition of Excelsior as follows:

The swearing-in ceremony of the new king was particularly moving.

It was exactly 10:30 AM when Mr. Soufoulis, the president of the Chamber, entered the chamber hall, which was draped in Greek colors and adorned with several flower garlands surrounding the sovereign's monogram.

The diplomatic corps, in full representation, were stationed to the right of the presidential seat.

The stands were packed. Among the audience were the most notable ladies of the capital.

A few minutes later, the ministers made their entrance. King Alexander then appeared, accompanied by Mr. Venizelos and surrounded by officers of his civil and military household.

The new sovereign was greeted by unanimous applause; he bowed in acknowledgment.

The Metropolitan then approached, presented him with the Gospel, and began to read the oath formula, which the king repeated, his hand on the book, adding at the end of each phrase, 'I swear it.'

After signing the document, Mr. Venizelos handed the throne speech (Note: This speech is reproduced at the following address: Duffy, Michael (August 22, 2009). "King Alexander's Coronation Address to Greek Parliament, 4 August 1917". First World War. Archived from the original on April 21, 2024.) to the sovereign, who began reading it with a hesitant voice, filled with emotion. The speech, which lasted fifteen minutes, was listened to in total silence. The crowd greeted the final words with cries of 'Long live the King!'

Upon leaving, without any incidents, the crowd lining the path applauded King Alexander, Mr. Venizelos, and the members of the government.

The troops of the National Defense, under the command of the heroic General Christadoulo, provided the honor guard.

Reduced to the rank of a puppet sovereign, Alexander I ultimately appeared to be a prisoner of the Venizelists.

=== Investiture of George II (1922) ===
Following the accidental death of Alexander I, who succumbed to sepsis as a result of a monkey bite, and the return to power of Constantine I in 1920, Greece found itself deeply embroiled in the Greco-Turkish War. The country's military setbacks resulted in a new revolution, which compelled the sovereign to abdicate on September 27, 1922 (September 13 Julian). On the same day, his eldest son ascended the throne as George II.

The diary of Prince Nicholas offers further insight into the events of September 27:

We were in the hall [of the royal palace], at the top of the staircase, waiting for a priest to organize the oath of the new king! The Metropolitan [Theocletus I] was somewhere in the countryside, and no member of the Holy Synod was present in Athens. Around noon, we finally found a priest. [Prime Minister] Triantaphyllakos and [Foreign Minister] Kalogeropoulos were notified; they were waiting in the royal aides-de-camp office. The swearing-in took place downstairs, in King Constantine I's office, without any pomp. Everyone wore ordinary clothes. I was talking with Ioannis Metaxas in a corner, near the staircase. King Constantine stood a little further away, talking with the aide-de-camp on duty. Only the Crown Prince, Triantaphyllakos, and Kalogeropoulos attended the swearing-in. These events unfolded at a dramatic and astonishing speed, and we were so confused that we felt no emotion. Yet, what a historic moment this was for our family and poor Greece!

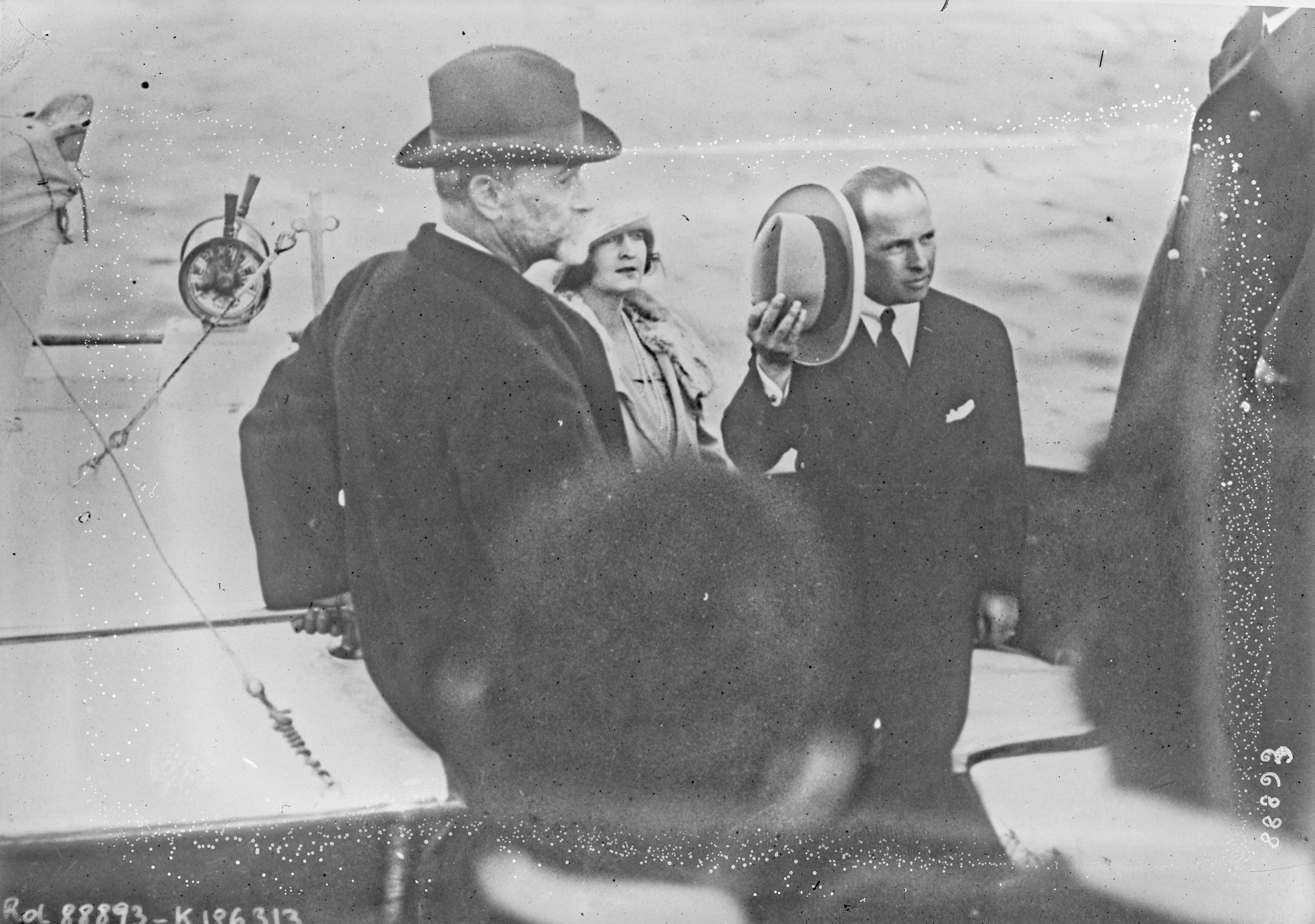
King George II and his wife leaving Greece in 1923

Following the pronouncement of the royal oath and the subsequent recording of the investiture, the Triantaphyllakos government submitted its resignation to the newly appointed monarch, who accepted it. Later that day, at 5 p.m., George II proceeded to Parliament to renew his oath before the nation's elected officials. The capital was subsequently illuminated in honor of the new monarch.

Following the return of the Venizelists to power, George II was effectively reduced to the status of a puppet sovereign. He was compelled to flee the country on December 19, 1923, and was ultimately deposed on March 25, 1924, when the Second Hellenic Republic was proclaimed. Nevertheless, following his reinstatement to the throne by a royalist military revolution and subsequent rigged referendum, he resumed his reign on November 25, 1935.

=== Investiture of Paul I (1947) ===
Following the demise of George II on April 1, 1947, at 1:55 p.m., his brother Paul ascended to the throne amidst the ongoing civil war in Greece. At approximately 8 p.m., the monarch proceeded to the throne room of the royal palace to take the oath prescribed by the 1911 Constitution. The ceremony brought together numerous high-ranking officials, including the Prime Minister and government, the speaker and vice-speakers of Parliament, approximately eighty deputies present in the capital, the Archbishop of Athens, members of the Holy Synod, members of the Council of State, the Court of Audit, military officers, plenipotentiary ministers, and other high officials. As detailed in her memoirs, Queen Frederica observed the proceedings from a small balcony above, concealed behind a curtain.

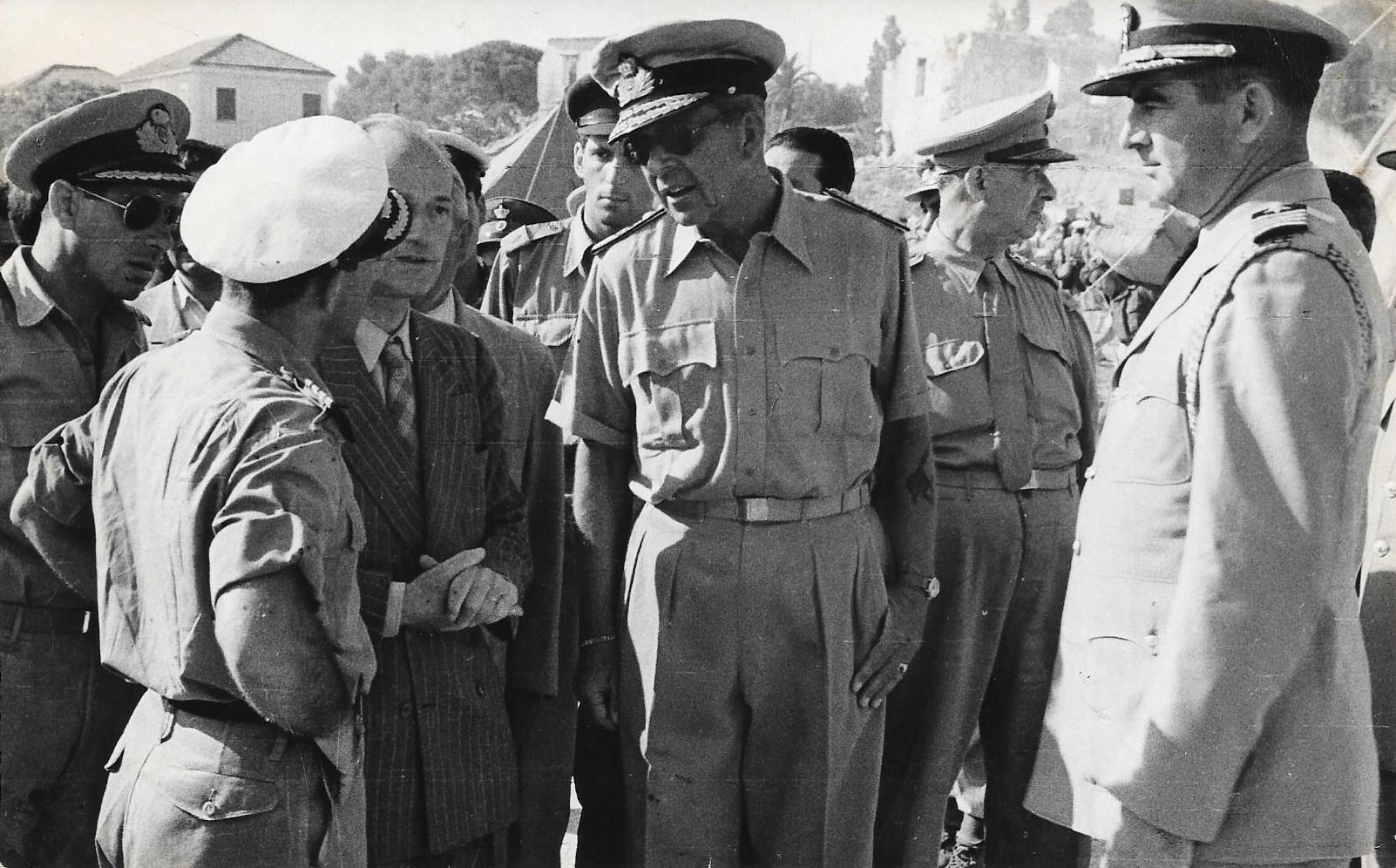
King Paul I in 1953

Paul I, attired in an admiral's uniform, was greeted in the throne room by Prime Minister Dimitrios Maximos and Archbishop Damaskinos. The king stood before a table on which the Gospel and two candlesticks were placed, with the Archbishop to his right and the Prime Minister to his left. Subsequently, the head of government addressed the assembly with the following words: "It is with profound sorrow that I must inform you of the unexpected passing of King George II. His Majesty King Paul, in accordance with Articles 43 and 49 of the current Constitution, will assume the throne and take the oath before you." Once the oath was taken, the Speaker of Parliament, Ioannis Theotokis, proclaimed, "Long live the King!" which marked the commencement of Paul I's reign.

Following the conclusion of the ceremony, the Maximos government submitted its resignation to the king, but he refused to accept it. Ultimately, at 10:30 PM, Paul I addressed his subjects from the Athens radio station:

Greeks, it is with a broken heart that I announce the premature death of my beloved brother, our King George II. He leaves this world with a clear conscience, having refused no sacrifice in the service of our homeland. Today, called upon to continue his work, I will devote all the strength of my soul to the good of the nation. Our eternal homeland asks us today to fight for its existence, its independence, and its freedoms. United, we will successfully carry out this struggle. Long live Greece!

On April 21, the king renewed his oath before Parliament in the presence of Archbishop Damaskinos. He then addressed the deputies, declaring that he would welcome communist guerrillas who laid down their arms "as a father receives his repentant son." Following the ceremony, Paul I was acclaimed by the Assembly, and 101 cannon shots were fired in his honor.

=== Investiture of Constantine II (1964) ===
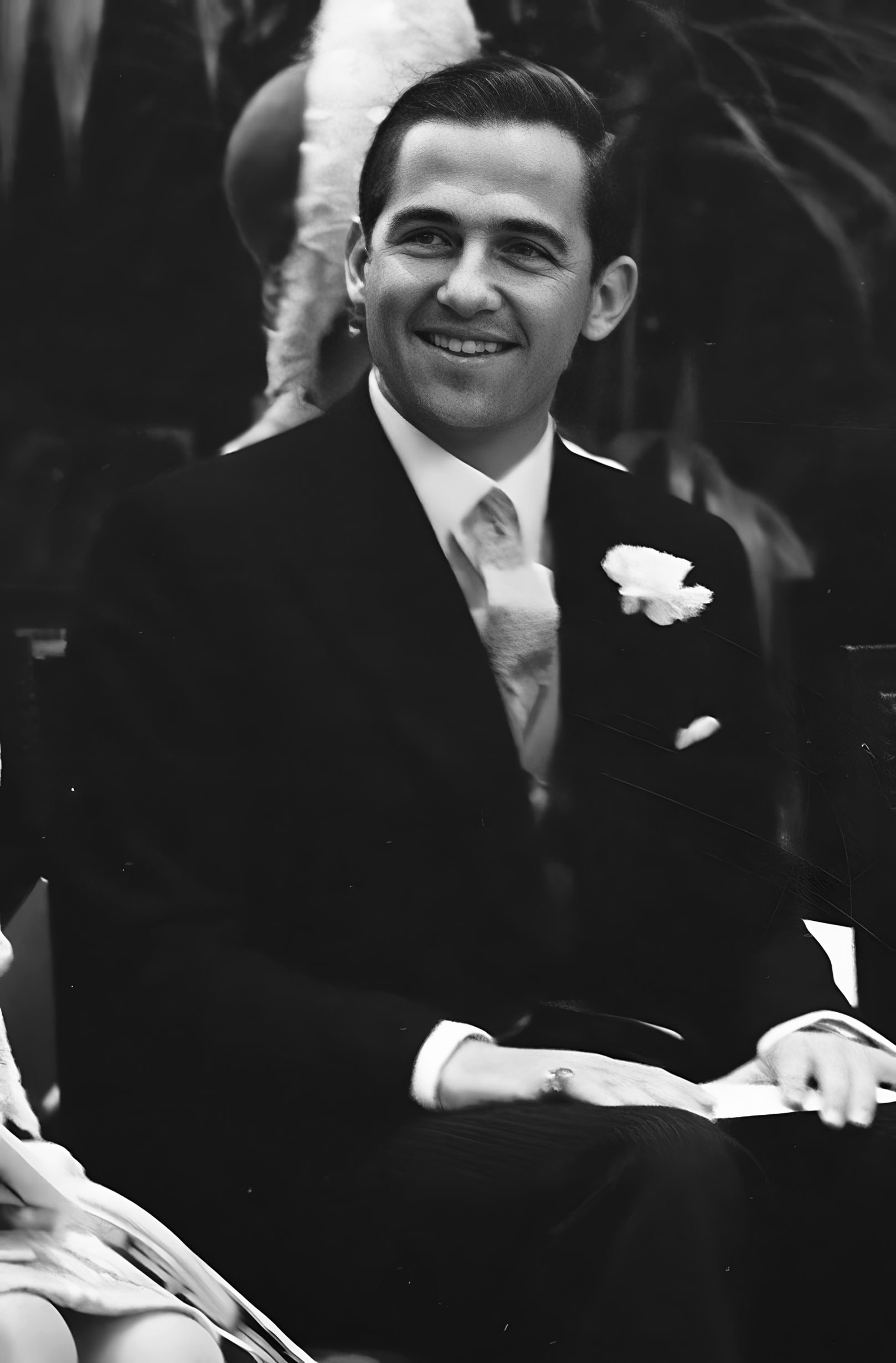
King Constantine II in 1966

Constantine II had been serving as regent since February 20, 1964, and ascended to the throne upon the death of his father, King Paul, on March 6, 1964. Accompanied by his sister Irene, who was now the crown princess, and his cousin Prince Michael, who served as royal aide-de-camp, the new monarch arrived at the throne room of the palace at 7:30 PM to take the oath prescribed by the 1952 Constitution. Wearing a field marshal's uniform, Constantine II appeared visibly fatigued and emotional.

In accordance with established protocol, Prime Minister Georgios Papandreou informed the assembly, which included the Archbishop and the Holy Synod, ministers, members of the Council of State, military chiefs, and other officials, that King Constantine II was assuming the throne in succession to his father and would take the oath of office under Articles 43 and 49 of the Constitution. With a voice imbued with emotion, the monarch repeated the words of the oath. Upon completion of this act, the Prime Minister proclaimed, "Long live the king!" Ultimately, the monarch, the Prime Minister, the President of Parliament, the Archbishop of Athens, and the members of the cabinet appended their signatures to the official record of the ceremony.

Later, at 9:30 PM, the young monarch addressed his subjects via a radio speech, transcribed by The New York Times:

I succeed my father on the throne with the firm determination to follow his good example and to be inspired by his virtues as I carry out my constitutional duties. I pledge to serve my country with unwavering devotion and all my resolve as a vigilant guardian of the free institutions of the democratic regime. My only thoughts and efforts will always be the true and supreme interests of our homeland.

In the days following the death of Paul I, Greece was confronted with a constitutional dilemma. Legislative elections had been held shortly before the monarch's demise, necessitating the convening of the newly elected Parliament. However, the question of Constantine II's eligibility to sign the requisite decree remained unresolved, as he had not yet sworn the oath before the deputies. This unprecedented situation gave rise to a debate over the constitutional implications of the monarch's inability to assume the throne. The Constitution, however, had not anticipated this particular scenario. Ultimately, the decision was taken to convene Parliament as scheduled, allowing for the renewal of the royal oath and the subsequent assumption of power by Constantine II.

On March 23, 1964, Constantine II proceeded to Parliament, accompanied solely by his sister. Upon entering the building, he was greeted by the Prime Minister and subsequently announced by the president of the chamber, Georgios Athanasiadis-Novas. Subsequently, a religious service was conducted by Archbishop Chrysostomos II, followed by a brief address from the president of Parliament. Subsequently, the king took the oath as prescribed by the Constitution and proceeded to deliver the throne speech, which had been prepared by Georgios Papandreou. In his memoirs, the king states that this text marked the first point of contention between him and the Prime Minister, as the monarch expressed disagreement with questioning the Zurich Accords just three years after their signing. Nevertheless, the king fulfilled his obligation and delivered the text that had been provided to him.

== See also ==
- Greek crown jewels
- Coronation of the Byzantine emperor

== Bibliography ==
=== Sovereign biographies ===
- Bower, Leonard (2001). Otho I : King of Greece, A Biography. Royalty Digest. ISBN 1-905159-12-9.
- Christmas, Captain Walter (1999) [1914]. King George of Greece. New York: Adegi Graphics LLC. ISBN 1402175272.
- Hourmouzios, Stelio (1972). No Ordinary Crown : A Biography of King Paul of the Hellenes. Weidenfeld & N. ISBN 0-297-99408-5.
- Tantzos, Nicholas (1990). H.M. Konstantine XIII : King of the Hellenes. Atlantic International Publications. ISBN 0-938311-12-3.
- Van der Kiste, John (1994). Kings of the Hellenes : The Greek Kings, 1863-1974. Sutton Publishing. ISBN 0-7509-2147-1.

=== History of Greece ===
- Driault, Édouard; Lhéritier, Michel (1926a). Histoire diplomatique de la Grèce de 1821 à nos jours : Le Règne d'Othon - La Grande Idée (1830–1862) [Diplomatic history of Greece from 1821 to the present day: The Reign of Otto - The Great Idea (1830-1862)] (in French). Vol. II. PUF. Archived from the original on September 18, 2024.
- Driault, Édouard; Lhéritier, Michel (1926b). Histoire diplomatique de la Grèce de 1821 à nos jours : Le Règne de Georges Ier avant le traité de Berlin (1862–1878) - Hellénisme et slavisme [Diplomatic history of Greece from 1821 to the present day: The reign of George I before the Treaty of Berlin (1862-1878) - Hellenism and Slavism] (in French). Vol. III. PUF. Archived from the original on October 9, 2024.
- Driault, Édouard; Lhéritier, Michel (1926c). Histoire diplomatique de la Grèce de 1821 à nos jours : La Grèce et la Grande Guerre - De la Révolution turque au traité de Lausanne (1908–1923) [Diplomatic history of Greece from 1821 to the present day: Greece and the Great War - From the Turkish Revolution to the Treaty of Lausanne (1908-1923)] (in French). Vol. V. PUF.
- Lenormant, François (1865). La Grèce et les îles Ioniennes : études de politique et d'histoire contemporaine [Greece and the Ionian Islands: studies in politics and contemporary history] (in French). Paris: Michel Lévy frères. Archived from the original on December 30, 2023.
- Vacalopoulos, Apostolos (1975). Histoire de la Grèce moderne [History of modern Greece] (in French). Roanne: Horvath. ISBN 2-7171-0057-1.
