= Constitutional history of Greece =

In the modern history of Greece, starting from the Greek War of Independence, the Constitution of 1975/1986/2001 is the last in a series of democratically adopted Constitutions (with the exception of the Constitutions of 1968 and 1973 imposed by a dictatorship).

== Greek War of Independence ==
During the Greek War of Independence, three constitutional texts (Constitutions of 1822, 1823 and 1827) were adopted by the Greek National Assemblies, the national representative political gatherings of the Greek revolutionaries. These constitutions were influenced by:

- the French Constitutions of 1793 and 1795,
- the French Declaration of the Rights of Man and of the Citizen,
- the Draft Constitution of Rigas Velestinlis,
- the three Constitutions of the Ionian Islands.

A year before the adoption of the Greek Constitution of 1822, local Assemblies had ratified the so-called Greek local statutes, such as the Senate Organization of Western Greece, the Legal Order of Eastern Greece and the Peloponnesian Senate Organization.

== From the absolute to the constitutional monarchy (1833–1924) ==
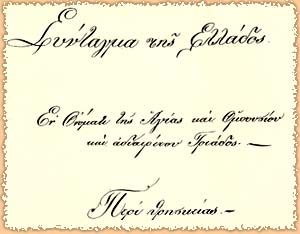
In the name of the Holy, Consubstantial and Indivisible Trinity...are the first words of the Greek Constitution of 1844.

King Otto governed for more than 10 years (including the first two years under a regency council) without any constitutional restrictions since the "hegemonical" Greek Constitution of 1832 was never implemented. On 3 September 1843, the infantry, led by Colonel Dimitrios Kallergis and the Revolutionary captain Ioannis Makriyannis, assembled in the square in front of the palace in Athens. Eventually joined by much of the population of the small capital, the rebellion refused to disperse until the king agreed to grant a constitution. Left with little recourse, King Otto gave in to the pressure and agreed to the demands of the crowd over the objections of his opinionated Queen. This square was renamed to Constitution Square (Syntagma Square) to commemorate the events of September 1843.

The Greek Constitution of 1844 defined Greece as a constitutional monarchy, providing for a bicameral parliament, consisting of a Chamber of Deputies and a Senate. After the expulsion of King Otto, the Constitution of 1864 was established to implement the transition from constitutional monarchy to a crowned republic (abolishing the senate in favor of a parliament) under a new sovereign. The Constitution of 1864 was somewhat more liberal, and transferred most of the real power to the parliament. In 1874, Charilaos Trikoupis published a manifesto entitled "Who's to blame?" (Τίς πταίει;), naming King George I as the answer. Specifically, he condemned the king for bypassing parliamentary opinion in his selection of Prime Ministers. The article landed him briefly in jail, but also boosted his popularity significantly. A year later, on 8 May 1874 he mustered a parliamentary plurality and George reluctantly named him as Prime Minister. Thanks to Trikoupis' article, a new constitutional principle, the Principle of the Stated (Αρχή της Δεδηλωμένης) was recognized and implemented: the king was required to give the largest party in parliament first choice of forming a government. In 1911, Eleftherios Venizelos amended 54 non-fundamental of the 110 articles of the Constitution, trying to bring the constitution in line with his Liberal Party's principles. Nevertheless, the National schism of 1916 caused a huge constitutional crisis, as two governments were formed: one in Athens and one in Thessaloniki.

== The Second Hellenic Republic and the return of the king (1925–1941) ==
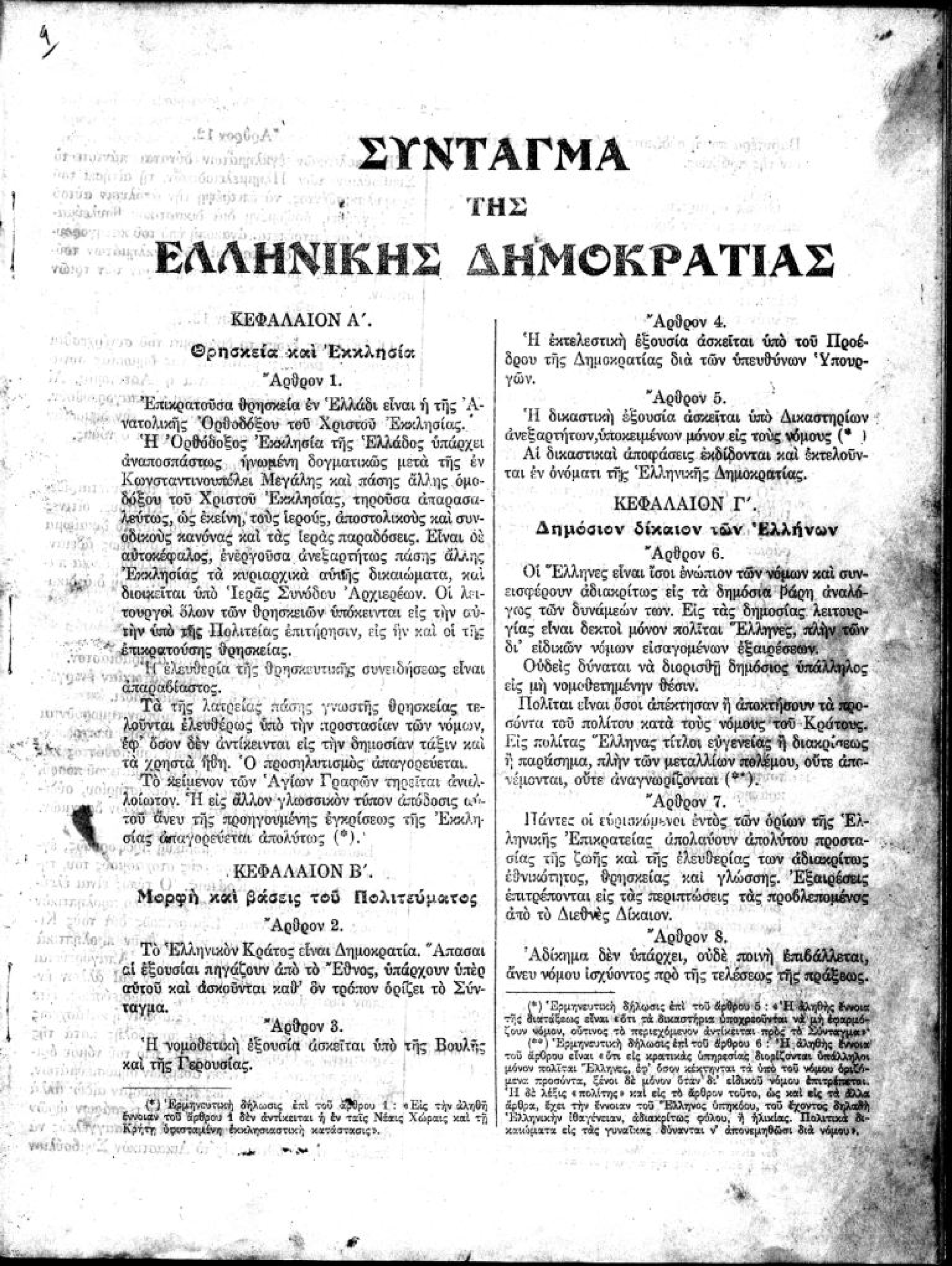
Front page of the 1927 Constitution

The Constitution of 1925 provided for a Republic in accordance with the results of the plebiscite of 1924. Nonetheless, on 24 June 1925, officers loyal to Theodoros Pangalos, fearing that the political instability was putting the country at risk, overthrew the government in a coup and violated the Constitution. On 22 August 1926, a counter-coup deposed him and Pavlos Kountouriotis returned as president on 24 August.

Since the previous Constitution was not fully implemented, it was the Constitution of 1927 which formally established the Second Hellenic Republic and provided for a largely ceremonial president as head of state.

After the plebiscite of 1935, King George II was restored, but the Third Revisionary Parliament of 1936 did not have the time to replace or amend the Constitution of the Republic. Instead, the Constitution of 1911 was restored, ostensibly on a temporary basis. The elections of 1936 had produced a political deadlock and, thereby, George II appointed Ioannis Metaxas to be interim prime minister. Widespread industrial unrest in May allowed Metaxas to declare a state of emergency. On 4 August, he suspended the parliament indefinitely and suspended various articles of the constitution, with the king's approval. For all intents and purposes, Metaxas was now a dictator. No constitutional amendment was adopted before Germany invaded Greece in 1941.

== The Kingdom of Greece after the Second World War (1942–1967) ==
After the end of the Second World War, King George II was once again restored by virtue of the plebiscite of 1946. The implications of the Greek Civil War did not allow the ratification of the liberal Draft Constitution of 1948. The Constitution of 1952 was based on the Constitution of 1911, but it was effectively a new constitution since it was in violation of the revision clause of the Constitution of 1911. It established a parliamentary monarchy with the king as head of state and the army, based on the principle of the separation of powers. However, the king maintained considerable powers, such as dissolving the government and parliament and calling new elections. Moreover, article 31 stated that the king hires and fires ministers (Greek: Ο βασιλεύς διορίζει και παύει τους υπουργούς αυτού). This created confusion as the prime minister was chosen by popular election, but the elected prime minister could not select the government's ministers without the king's approval. Two prime ministers in the 1950s had raised the question as to who governs the state, the king or the prime minister, echoing the disagreements between Venizelos and Constantine I during the National Schism. Moreover, the constitution imposed restrictions on basic human rights and banned the Communist Party of Greece (KKE).

From 1955 to 1963, Greece was under the governorship of Constantine Karamanlis, who was widely acknowledged for bringing political and economic stability to Greece. However, in the early 1960s, there was a growing awareness that the repressive measures taken due to civil war and its aftermath were no longer needed. This became clear with the death of a left-wing member of parliament Grigoris Lambrakis, where several high state officials were found to be involved either in the assassination or in its cover-up. While no one, even from the severest of his left-wing critics, blamed Karamanlis for the incident, he resigned and self-exiled to France.

Georgios Papandreou and his political party, Center Union, having a moderate reformist platform, gained considerable traction and rose to power in elections of 1963 and later in elections of 1964. However, seeds of resentment towards Papandreou from the military grew as they were excluded from salary increases. He also made a faint attempt to gain control of the military, which alarmed many officers without weakening them. The latter created friction with the King Constantine II, who wanted to be in command of the army and not the elected government. In the meantime, the son of Georgios Papandreou, Andreas Papandreou, who had joined Greek politics after 23 years in the United States as a prominent academic, was campaigning by having fierce anti-monarchy and anti-American rhetoric, destabilizing the fragile political equilibrium. Andreas Papandreou's militant and uncompromising stance made him a target of conspiratorial accusations from ultra-rightists who feared that following any new elections, which the nearly 80-year-old Georgios Papandreou would likely win, his son would be the actual focus of power in the party. These incidents caused a dispute between Georgios Papandreou and King Constantine II, leading to the resignation of the former.

For the next twenty-two months, there was no elected government, and hundreds of demonstrations took place, with many being injured and killed in clashes with the police. The constitutionality of the king's actions is disputed. Constantine tried to bribe members of the Center Union party to his side and form a government, leading to Iouliana of 1965. He temporarily succeeded in getting 45 members, including Constantine Mitsotakis, to his side, who later were called 'apostates' by the side supporting Papandreous. To end the political deadlock, Georgios Papandreou attempted a more moderate approach with the king, but Andreas Papandreou publicly rejected his father's effort and attacked the whole establishment, attracting the support of 41 members of the Center Union in an effort designed to gain the party's leadership and preventing any compromise. The prolonged political instability between the politicians and the king in finding a solution led a group of Colonels to intervene and rule Greece for seven years.

== The Colonels' Regime (1967–1974) ==
On 21 April 1967, a coup took place by right-wing officers, which established a dictatorship known as the Colonels' Regime. An attempted counter-coup by King Constantine II in December failed, forcing him to leave the country. Several prominent politicians were either imprisoned or exiled, including Andreas Papandreou and Mitsotakis. Thus, legally, there was no government and no Head of State in Athens. Thereby, the Revolutionary Council of Stylianos Pattakos, George Papadopoulos and Nikolaos Makarezos made a brief appearance to cause a Resolution to be published in the Government Gazette, appointing another member to the military administration, Major General Georgios Zoitakis, as Regent. Zoitakis then appointed Papadopoulos as Prime Minister. A new constitution was adopted by referendum in 1968. King Constantine was officially retained as head of state, though he would not be allowed to return until the first parliamentary election unless the government recalled him sooner. Many of the guarantees of civil rights were suspended, and elections were postponed until the "Revolution of April 21" (as the coup was called) had reformed the "Greek mentality."

Five years later, during Papadopoulos' attempts at controlled democratization, he abolished the monarchy and declared Greece a republic with himself as president. A plebiscite formally abolished the monarchy on 29 July 1973. A new Constitution was drafted, providing for a popularly elected president with wide-ranging powers, effectively establishing a presidential republic. After the hard-liners' coup on 25 November 1973 deposed Papadopoulos, the regime retained the trappings of the Republic, but not the 1973 constitution; it reverted to exclusively military control until its final collapse in the wake of the Cyprus crisis in August 1974.

== The Third Hellenic Republic (1974–present) ==
With the return of civilian rule under Constantine Karamanlis, the new government, acting under extraordinary circumstances, issued a "Constituting Act" which voided the 1973 constitution. Pending a referendum on a new constitution, the 1952 constitution was temporarily restored, "except for the articles dealing with the form of the State"; the last phrase referred to whether the monarchy would be restored or not. In the meantime, the functions of the king were to be discharged by the incumbent President of the Republic General Phaedon Gizikis who was appointed by the Ioannides' short-lived regime as a nominal figurehead.

The matter was settled by plebiscite on 8 December 1974, by which the monarchy was definitively abolished. A new Constitution, adopted by Parliament and promulgated on 11 June 1975, established a parliamentary democracy with a president as head of state. Karamanlis reinforced the executive branch's power, represented by the prime minister, while the president would act as the head of state with sufficient reserve powers, the right to call elections, appoint a government, dissolve Parliament, and call referendums on important national questions. Moreover, the president could veto any legislation that did not reflect the popular will that could only be overcome with three fifth parliamentary majority. The presidential powers, which overall exceeded those of the monarch under the 1952 Constitution, were drawn inspiration from the recent Gaullism reforms in the France where Karamanlis spent time (1963–1974).

Papandreou triggered a constitutional crisis by employing dubious constitutional methods, to revise the constitution in 1985 to increase the powers of the prime minister by removing the reserve powers of the president, which were acting as checks and balances; effectively turning the prime minister into a "parliamentary autocrat". The Constitution was amended again in 2001, 2008, and 2019 and is in force today.

== List of Greek Constitutions ==
In a chronological order, the Greek Constitutions are:

1. Greek Constitution of 1822
2. Greek Constitution of 1823
3. Greek Constitution of 1827
4. Greek Constitution of 1832
5. Greek Constitution of 1844
6. Greek Constitution of 1864
7. Greek Constitution of 1911
8. Greek Constitution of 1925
9. Greek Constitution of 1927
10. Draft Constitution of 1948
11. Greek Constitution of 1952 pdf
12. Greek Constitution of 1968
13. Greek Constitution of 1973
14. Greek Constitution of 1975/1986/2001/2008/2019

== See also ==
- History of the Hellenic Republic

== Notes ==
1. Legal scholar George Anastadiadis stated in 1981 that there are two schools of thought. The first school of thought focuses on the strict and legal interpretation of the 1952 Constitution (the letter of the law) with emphasis on the King's right to nominate and recall his ministers (Article 31). The second school of thought emphasizes the constitutional conventions and principles (the spirit of the law) and, in particular, the dedilomeni principle, an established interpretation since 1875 and codified in the 1952 Constitution, stating that the government must have the confidence of the Chamber of Deputies (Article 78). In the former school of thought, the king acted within his constitutional rights, while in the latter, the king's actions violated the constitution of 1952. Andreas Papandreou used the dedilomeni principle in an interview in Unitá on 21 July 1965 to argue that the king did not have the right "to exchange at its own pleasure the democratically elected chiefs of the country." Nikos Alivizatos, a constitutional scholar, also uses the argument by Andreas Papandreou but also extends it so that it would be unconstitutional for the king to maintain control of the armed forces since no such competence has been recognized, even though the explicit statement in the 1952 Constitution naming the king as the leader of the armed forces (Article 32) and it was an established tradition since his namesake grandfather. Law scholars Fortsakis and Spyropoulos also consider the king's insistence on appointing friendly governments "verging on the unconstitutional" but acknowledge that in the end, the king's third candidate (Stefanos Stefanopoulos) received a vote of confidence from the parliament; they also note that the political exercise of king's prerogatives was unjustifiable. Charles Moskos asserts that while the king has the right to appoint and dismiss his ministers and hold a government subject to a vote of confidence, at the same time, he considers constitutionally unclear whether the king was obliged to call elections after the prime minister resigned. Th. Tsatsos, a conservative Greek lawyer, argued that the king has the right to dismiss the prime minister or his ministers if a critical difference of opinion emerges between them. While the king was tempted to act outside the constitutional boundaries, i.e., staging a coup, he needed American support, which he did not receive. Most right-wing politicians supporting the king believed that Georgios Papandreou could be dealt with by constitutional means. In the end, Georgios Papandreou, who raised the constitutional challenge, agreed with Kanellopoulos and the king that the election would be performed no later than May 1967 in exchange for not relying on EDA support, and Close presumes that Papandreou would not question the king's powers in the political debate. Notable historians (Richard Clogg, David Close, Koliopoulos & Veremis) avoid in taking sides regarding the constitutionality of the king's actions. Christopher Woodhouse describes the refusal of the king to assign the Ministry of Defence to Papandreou within the constitutional rights of the king but acknowledged that the king was ill-advised on how to respond to Papandreou in their mail correspondence as they argued their positions.

== Sources ==
Constitutions of Greece

- "Greek Constitution of 1952". Government Gazette (Greece) ΦΕΚ A 1/1952 (in Greek). National Printing Office.
- "Greek Constitution of 1975". Government Gazette (Greece) ΦΕΚ A 111/1975 (in Greek). National Printing Office.
- "Greek Constitution of 1986". Government Gazette (Greece) ΦΕΚ A 23/1986 (in Greek). National Printing Office.

Books

- Alivizatos, Nikos (2011). Το Σύνταγμα και οι εχθροί του στη νεοελληνική ιστορία 1800-2010 (in Greek). Athens: ΠΟΛΙΣ. ISBN 9789604353064.
- Anastasiadis, George (1981). Ο διορισμός και η παύση των κυβερνήσεων στην Ελλάδα: από την "αρχή της δεδηλωμένης" στο Σύνταγμα του 1975 [The appointment and dismissal of governments in Greece: From the 'principle of declared confidence' to the 1975 Constitution] (in Greek). Athens: University Studio Press. ISBN 9780001208902.
- Clogg, Richard (2013). A Concise History of Greece. Cambridge: Cambridge University Press. ISBN 9781107656444.
- Close, David H. (2014). Greece since 1945: Politics, Economy and Society. London & New York: Taylor & Francis. ISBN 9781317880011.
- Curtis, Glenn E. (1995). Greece, A Country Study. Maryland: Library of Congress. ISBN 1490436235.
- Dervitsiotis, Alkis (2019). Η έννοια της Κυβέρνησης (in Greek). Athens: P.N. Sakkoulas SA. ISBN 9789604208005.
- Featherstone, Kevin; Katsoudas, Dimitrios K., eds. (1987). Political change in Greece: Before and after the colonels. London & New York: Taylor & Francis. ISBN 9781000992144.
- ——————; Papadimitriou, Dimitris (2015). Prime Ministers in Greece, The Paradox of Power. Oxford: Oxford University Press. ISBN 978-0198717171.
- Hatzivassiliou, Evanthis [in Greek] (2006). Greece and the Cold War Front Line State, 1952-1967. London & New York: Taylor & Francis. ISBN 9781134154883.
- Karakatsanis, Neovi M.; Swarts, Jonathan (2018). American Foreign Policy Towards the Colonels' Greece. London: Palgrave Macmillan. ISBN 9781137523181.
- Koliopoulos, John S.; Veremis, Thanos M. [in Greek] (2009). Modern Greece A History Since 1821. Oxford: Wiley-Blackwell. ISBN 9781444314830.
- Lagos, Katerina; Othon, Anastasakis, eds. (2021). The Greek Military Dictatorship Revisiting a Troubled Past, 1967-1974. New York & London: Berghahn Books. ISBN 9781800731752.
- Mouzelis, Nicos P. (1978). Modern Greece: facets of underdevelopment. London: The Macmillan Press Ltd. ISBN 978-0333226155.
- Pridham, Geoffrey, ed. (2012). Securing Democracy. London & New York: Taylor & Francis. ISBN 9781134975419.
- Spyropoulos, Philippos C.; Fortsakis, Theodore P. (2017). Constitutional Law in Greece. Netherlands: Wolters Kluwer. ISBN 9789041192448.
- Woodhouse, Christopher M. (1998). Modern Greece: A short history. London: Faber & Faber. ISBN 0571197949.

Journals

- Clive, Nigel (1985). "The 1985 Greek Election and its Background". Government and Opposition. 20 (4): 488–503. doi:10.1111/j.1477-7053.1985.tb01100.x. JSTOR 44483257.
- Clogg, Richard (1975). "Karamanlis's cautious success: the background". Government and Opposition. 10 (3): 332–255. doi:10.1111/j.1477-7053.1975.tb00644.x. JSTOR 44483305.
- —————— (1996). "Andreas Papandreou – A political profile". Mediterranean Politics. 1 (3): 382–387. doi:10.1080/13629399608414596.
- Moskos, Charles C. (1971). "The breakdown of parliamentary democracy in Greece, 1965-67". The Greek Review of Social Research. 3 (3): 3–15. JSTOR 44481878.
- Tsarouhas, Dimitris (2005). "Explaining an activist military: Greece until 1975" (PDF). Southeast European Politics. 6 (1): 1–13.
- Wheeler, Marcus (1968). "Greek Political Perspectives". Government and Opposition. 3 (3): 339–351. doi:10.1111/j.1477-7053.1968.tb01295.x. JSTOR 44481878.
