= Greek national assemblies =

Representative bodies of the Greek people; convened periodically since the 1820s

The Greek national assemblies (Greek: Εθνοσυνελεύσεις) are representative bodies of the Greek people. During and in the direct aftermath of the Greek War of Independence (1821–1832), the name was used for the insurgents' proto-parliamentary assemblies. Thereafter, the term has been used for a number of extraordinary assemblies chiefly in regard to changes in the Constitution and the form of government of Greece.

== Assemblies of the War of Independence ==
Their purpose was the drafting of the first constitutions by which the nascent Greek state was to be governed, and elect the parliamentary and executive bodies to lead the struggle for liberation.

- First National Assembly of Epidaurus (December 1821 – January 1822), proclaimed Independence, adopted the first provisional constitution
- Second National Assembly at Astros (29 March – 18 April 1823), revised the Epiraurus constitution
- Third National Assembly at Epidaurus (6–16 April 1826), dissolved and reconvened at Ermioni and Aegina
- Third National Assembly at Aegina/Third National Assembly at Ermioni (January–March 1826), both claimed legitimacy, united at the
- Third National Assembly at Troezen (19 March – 5 May 1827), which adopted a new constitution and elected Ioannis Kapodistrias as Governor of Greece for seven years
- Fourth National Assembly at Argos (11 July – 6 August 1829), adopted a series of administrative reforms at the suggestion of Kapodistrias
- Fifth National Assembly at Nafplion (5 December 1831 – March 1832), agreed to the election of the Bavarian prince Otto as King of Greece, adopted a new (and in the event never to be implemented) Hegemonic Constitution

== Assemblies in independent Greece ==
These were convened decide on issues regarding the form of government and promulgate new constitutions.

- Third of September National Assembly of the Greeks at Athens (3 November 1843 – 18 March 1844), convened after the 3 September 1843 Revolution, drafted a new constitution making Greece a constitutional monarchy
- Second National Assembly of the Greeks at Athens (10 December 1862 – October 1864), convened in the aftermath of the ousting of King Otto, it presided over the election of Danish prince George Christian William as King of the Hellenes and the adoption of a new constitution
- Third National Assembly of the Greeks at Athens, convened in 1920, lasting until 1922 when it was dissolved in the aftermath of the Asia Minor Disaster
- Fourth National Assembly of the Greeks at Athens, convened in 1923, abolished the monarchy and declared the Second Hellenic Republic
- Fifth National Assembly at Athens, convened in October 1935, restored the monarchy and the 1911 constitution
