= Greek Senate =

Former upper chamber of the parliament in Greece, existing until 1935

Greek Senate Ελληνική Γερουσία

Type
- Type: Upper house of the Hellenic Parliament

History
- Established: 1927
- Disbanded: 1935
- Seats: 120

Meeting place
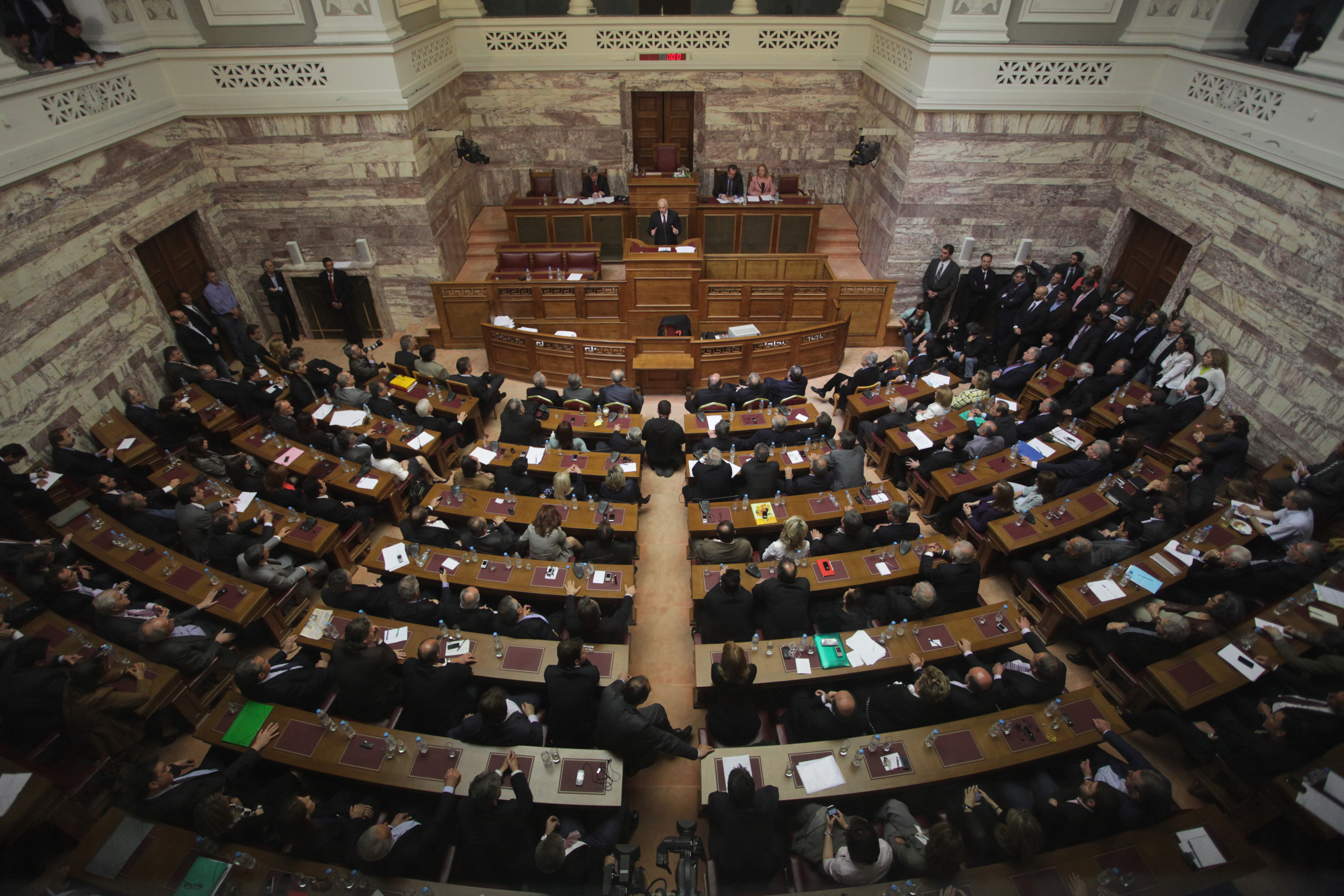
- Old Royal Palace, Athens

The Greek Senate (Greek: Ελληνική Γερουσία, romanized: Ellinikí Gerousía) was the upper chamber of the parliament in Greece, extant several times in the country's history.

== Local senates during the War of Independence ==
During the early stages of the Greek War of Independence, prior to the establishment of a centralized administration, a number of regional councils were established, most of which were termed "senate", but which were unicameral bodies: the Senate of Western Continental Greece, the Areopagus of Eastern Continental Greece (sometimes referred to as "senate"), and the Peloponnesian Senate.

== 1829–1833 ==
A unicameral body with purely advisory functions, the Senate was established in 1829 by the Fourth National Assembly at Argos in replacement of the Panellinion, established the previous year. It had 27 members, 21 of whom were chosen by the Governor (Ioannis Kapodistrias) from 63 candidates nominated by the Assembly, and further six who were appointed directly by the Governor. Georgios Sisinis was elected as its president. After Kapodistrias' murder in 1831, the Senate appointed a series of governing councils to lead the state. In 1832, the Fifth National Assembly at Nafplion abolished the Senate, but the Senate refused to recognize the act, and survived until the arrival of King Otto in February 1833.

== 1844–1864 ==
The Senate as an upper chamber was established by the Greek Constitution of 1844. The Senate had 27 members, appointed for life by the King, who in addition could appoint further members up to one half of the statutory number. The Senate, seen as a reactionary body and essentially dependent upon the King, was abolished by the Greek Constitution of 1864.

== 1927–1935 ==
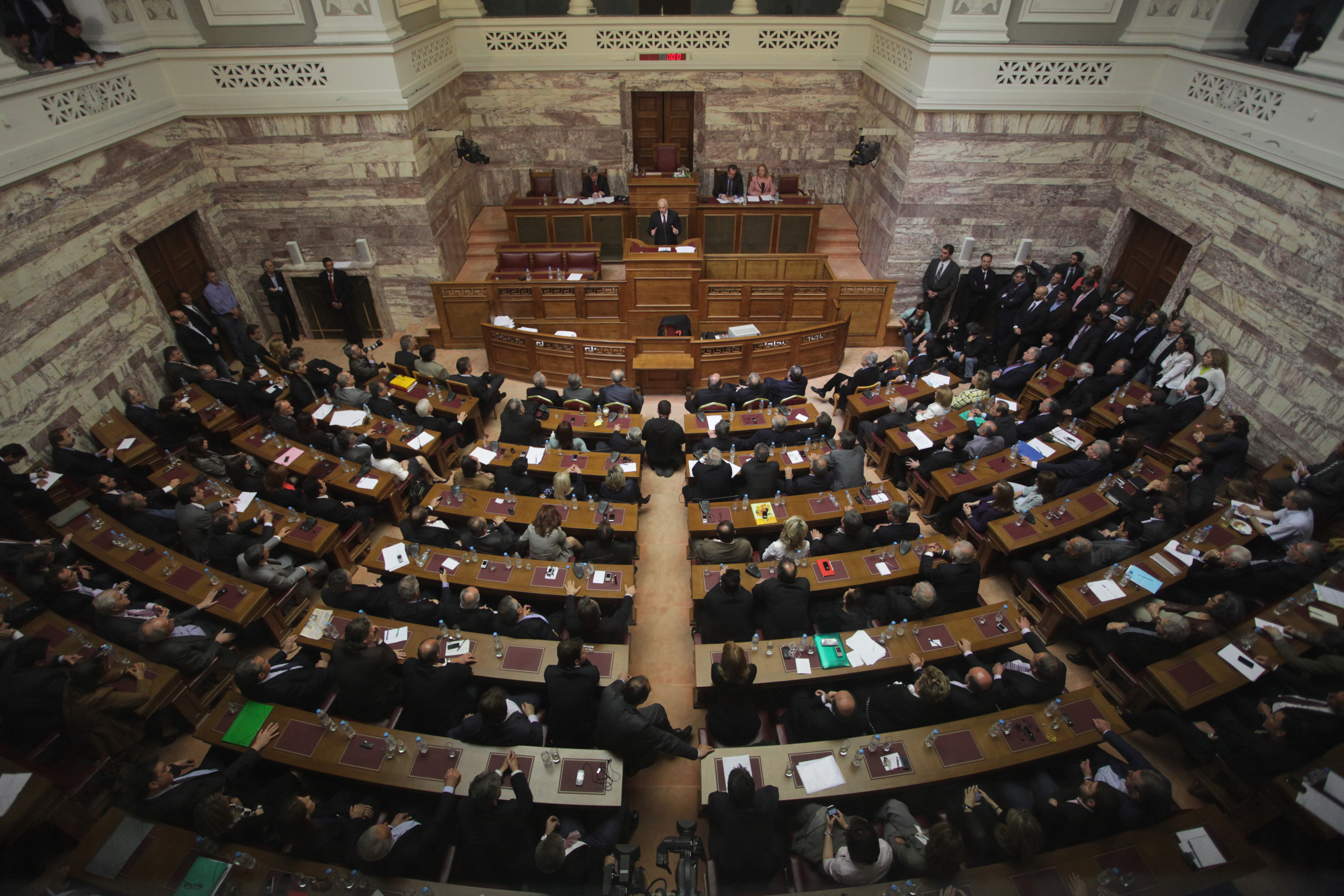
The Chamber of the Senate in the Hellenic Parliament.

On 2 January 1924, the Fourth National Assembly convened and decided the abrogation of the dynasty as well as the abolition of the crowned democracy (a decision which was ratified by referendum on 13 April 1924), establishing the Second Hellenic Republic.

Whilst the Fourth Constitutional Assembly was working towards the completion of the new Constitution, the coup d'état of General Theodoros Pangalos took place. After the fall of his dictatorship in 1926, the "Parliament of the First Term" was elected, which, finally, voted through the Constitution of 1927.

Legislative power was exercised by the Chamber of Deputies and the Senate. The Chamber was made up of 200-300 members elected for a four-year term by direct, secret and universal ballot. The Senate was composed of 120 members elected for a nine-year term, of which 92 were directly elected by thirds every three, 10 by the Chamber and the Senate in a common session at the onset of each parliamentary term, and 18 were elected by professional organizations.

In the event of disagreement between the two houses in the voting of a law, the Constitution established the supremacy of the Chamber's vote.

Another significant element was the explicit institution of the parliamentary system. For the first time, the Greek Constitution included a clause stating that the Cabinet must "enjoy the confidence of the Parliament".

The Second Hellenic Republic lasted until 1935. That year, as a result of a failed coup by the supporters of Venizelos, the military was purged, and the royalists, led by Georgios Kondylis, launched a successful coup on 10 October. The Constitution of 1927 was abolished, the Constitution of 1911 was re-instated, and King George II came back to the throne by a referendum.
