= History of the Hellenic Republic =

The history of the Hellenic Republic constitutes three republican periods in the modern history of Greece: from 1822 until 1832; from 1924 until 1935; and from 1974 through to the present. See also the constitutional history of Greece.

== First Hellenic Republic (1822–1832) ==
The First Hellenic Republic (Greek: Αʹ Ελληνική Δημοκρατία) is a historiographic term used for a series of councils and "Provisional Governments" during the Greek War of Independence. In the first stages of the uprising, various areas elected their own regional governing councils. These were replaced by central administration at the First National Assembly of Epidaurus in early 1822, which also adopted the first Greek Constitution. A series of National Assemblies followed, while Greece was threatened with collapse due to civil war and the victories of Ibrahim Pasha.

In 1827, the Third National Assembly at Troezen selected Count Ioannis Kapodistrias, who had previously been in Russia's diplomatic service, as Governor of Greece for a term of seven years. He arrived in Greece in January 1828 and established the Hellenic State, ruling with quasi-dictatorial powers. He was assassinated by political rivals in 1831 and was succeeded by his brother, Augustinos Kapodistrias until in 1832 the Great Powers declared Greece a Kingdom and selected the Bavarian Prince Otto to be its king.

== Second Hellenic Republic (1924–1935) ==
The Second Hellenic Republic (Greek: Βʹ Ελληνική Δημοκρατία) was declared on 25 March 1924, after the defeat of Greece by Turkey in the Asia Minor Disaster of 1922, the September 1922 Revolution and the subsequent exile and death of King Constantine I in 1923. The king and his chief opponent, Eleftherios Venizelos, had struggled over control of the country from 1915 to his death and the country was sorely divided (see National Schism). King Constantine was succeeded by his son, King George II, who in the wake of a failed royalist coup was asked by the parliament to leave Greece so the nation could decide what form of government it should adopt. In 1924, the Republic was proclaimed and confirmed by plebiscite.

The first President of the Hellenic Republic was Pavlos Kountouriotis, an Admiral and supporter of Venizelos who resigned after a coup d'état in 1925. He was succeeded by the coup's leader General Theodoros Pangalos, who was likewise deposed by the military 5 months later after embroiling Greece in the War of the Stray Dog. Kountouriotis was reinstated and reelected to the office in 1929, but was forced to resign for health reasons later that year. He was succeeded by Alexandros Zaimis, who served until the restoration of monarchy in 1935.

Despite a period of stability and relative prosperity under the last government of Eleftherios Venizelos in 1928–1932, the effects of the Great Depression were severely felt, and political instability returned. Although the opposition People's Party, which represented the royalist and anti-Venizelos factions of the electorate, had pledged to support the Republic, its imminent rise to power after the March 1933 elections caused fears of a return to the monarchy. A Venizelist coup was launched but quickly suppressed.

Following the outbreak of another Venizelist-inspired coup in March 1935, which was suppressed by General Georgios Kondylis, the army was purged of Venizelist and republican officers, and the return of the monarchy became inevitable. On 10 October 1935, the chiefs of the Armed Forces overthrew the government of Panagis Tsaldaris, and Kondylis declared himself Regent. He abolished the Republic and staged a plebiscite on 11 November which resulted in the return of King George II to the country.

== Third Hellenic Republic (1974–present) ==
The current Third Hellenic Republic (Greek: Γʹ Ελληνική Δημοκρατία) was declared in 1974 during the Metapolitefsi (Greek, "regime change"), after the end of the Regime of the Colonels which had controlled Greece since the coup d'état of 21 April 1967.

The Junta had already held a staged referendum to abolish the monarchy on 29 July 1973, and passed a new Constitution which established a presidential republic (with junta leader Georgios Papadopoulos as president). This short-lived attempt at controlled democratization was ended by the hardliners under Brigadier Dimitrios Ioannides, who overthrew Papadopoulos in November 1973 in the aftermath of the Athens Polytechnic uprising. The Republic was maintained, but was nothing more than a façade for the military regime until August 1974, when the Turkish invasion of Cyprus led to the collapse of the Junta.

After the fall of the regime and the return to civilian rule in August 1974 however, the legal and constitutional acts of the Junta were deemed invalid, and a new referendum was held on 8 December 1974, which finally abolished the monarchy. A new Constitution, promulgated on 11 June 1975, declared Greece a presidential parliamentary democracy (or republic – the Greek δημοκρατία can be translated both ways). This constitution, revised in 1985, 2001, 2008 and 2019, is still in force today.

== See also ==
- Athenian democracy
