= Dimitrios Christidis =

Greek politician and economist (1799–1877)

- Δημήτριος Χρηστίδης
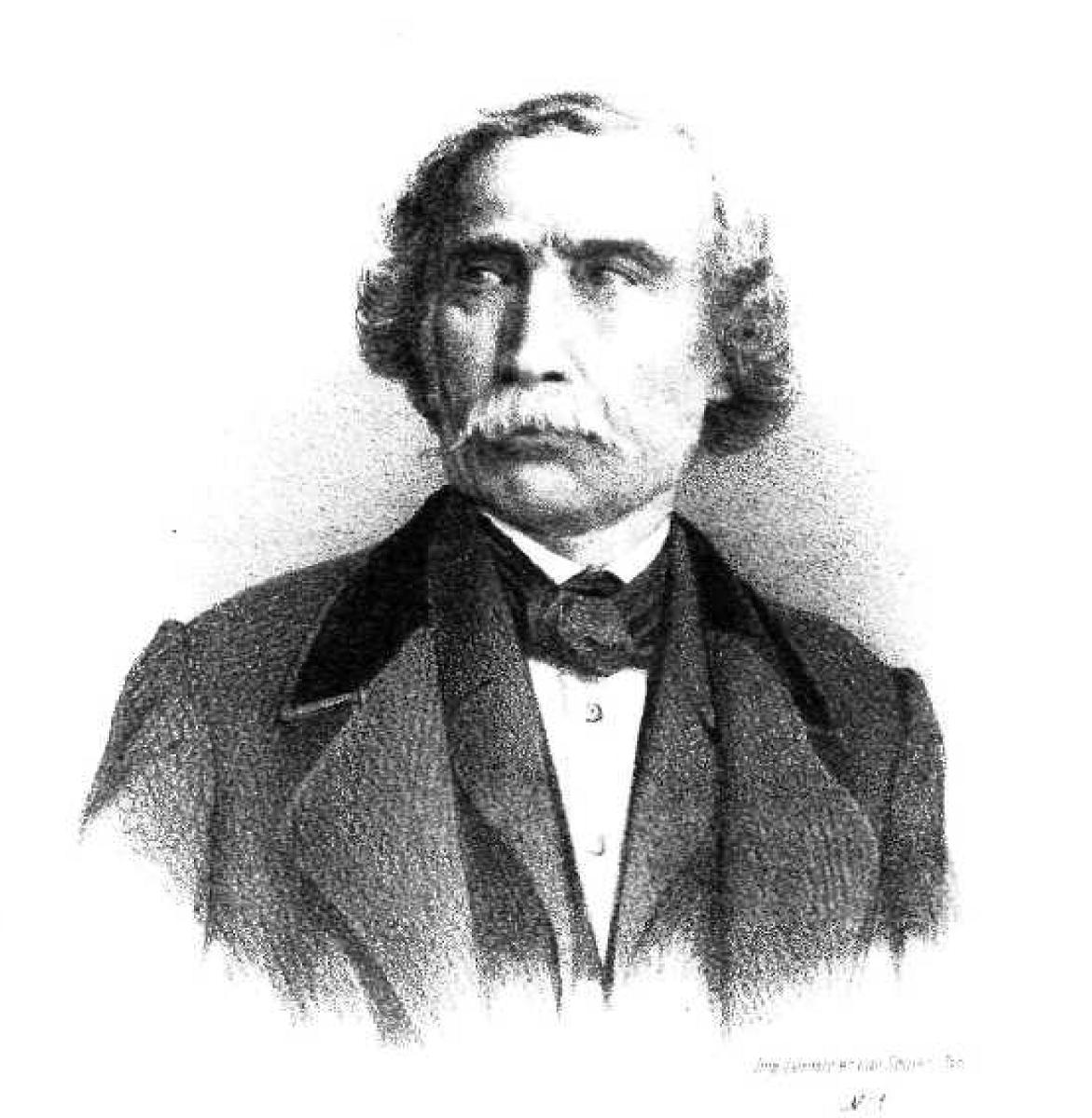
- A portrait of Dimitrios Christidis

Dimitrios Christidis (Greek: Δημήτριος Χρηστίδης, 1799–1877) was a Greek politician and economist. He served as Speaker of the Hellenic Parliament, Minister of Finance (seven times), Minister of Internal Affairs, Minister of Foreign Affairs and Minister of Justice. He was a Senator (1846–1851) and advisor to the State Council established by the Greek Constitution of 1864. He was elected several times as member of Parliament for Syros (1847–1877).

== Biographical information ==
He was born in Constantinople in 1799, and studied in the Great School of the Nation. He served as a tutor at the house of Soutsos family in Constantinople and then followed Alexandros Soutsos to Moldavia. Once he heard of the outbreak of the Greek Revolution, he rushed to Greece to offer his services. He participated with Alexandros Mavrokordatos in the first siege of Missolonghi (October–December 1822). The next year (1823) he went with Tombazis to Crete as general secretary of the Commission of Crete. From March to May 1825 he served as temporary general secretary of the Executive Corps, replacing Mavrokordatos, and the next year as secretary of Georgios Karaiskakis during the campaign of 1826–1827. He was involved in the organization of finances and the fundraising for the revolution. He became secretary of Ioannis Kolettis.

During the governance of Ioannis Kapodistrias he followed the political course of Kolettis. In 1828 he served as General Treasurer of Dimitrios Ypsilantis' military camp in Eastern Greece. In 1829–1830 he served as Governor of Samos. In 1830–1831 he was president of the Ekklitou of Sparta (an analogue to the current Court of Appeals).

After the assassination of Ioannis Kapodistrias, the emergence of Augustinos Kapodistrias as President of the Government by the Fifth National Assembly at Nafplion and the establishment of a second rival government body by the “Constitutionals” in Perachora (December 1831), Christidis was used by them in the administrative organization of their government.

In 1833, after the arrival of King Otto of Greece, he served for two months as Minister of Internal Affairs. From the first Ottonian years, Christidis became one of the most important members of the French Party, and competed with Rigas Palamidis for its leadership, after the dispatch of the party's leader, Kolettis, to the Greek Embassy in Paris (1835). Since 1833 he served in succession as Prefect of Messenia, Euboea and as governor of Syros for five years (1835–1840). Then he was sent as ambassador to Constantinople.

In July 1841 he was recalled from his position and took over the Ministry of Foreign Affairs in the short-lived government of Alexandros Mavrokordatos (July–August 1841), and then he became Deputy Prime Minister and finally, chairman of the government from August 1841 until September 1843, when King Otto did not appoint a Prime Minister but directed the government himself.

After the assumption of the premiership by Kolettis (August 1844), Christidis, who in the meantime had been named a Senator, was appointed as member of the committee which drew up the bill for dealing the church question. In 1849 he was appointed as Minister of Internal Affairs in the government of the Admiral Konstantinos Kanaris, but due to the reaction caused by the Anglophile party, the government resigned.

The following year Christidis became Minister of Finance (August 1850 – October 1853) in the government of Antonios Kriezis. From this position, he sought to achieve a balanced budget by stringent economies, but the decline of the agricultural production prevented the realization of his goals. One of his financial measures was a series of bills that aimed at the collection of overdue taxes and the modification of the tax system.

After the eviction of King Otto, he served as Minister of Finance in another government led by Kanaris (March to April 1864). He held the same position in the Epameinondas Deligeorgis government (October–November 1865) and in successive Dimitrios Voulgaris governments (June to December 1866, July to December 1870, July 1872 to February 1874). In 1869 he was elected as Member of Parliament for Syros and the same year he was Speaker of the Parliament, while he served as president of the committee on the Zappas Olympic Games. The people gave him the nickname "Psallidas" ("Scissors") because of his economic policies. He died in Athens on 8 January 1877 at the age of 78.

== Bibliography ==
- Christidis Dimitrios: Βιογραφική σημείωσις. Εν Αθήναις:Τύποις ""Εθνοφύλακος"", 1877.
- Νεκρολογία εις τον Δημήτριον Χρηστίδην: Ληφθείσα εκ της εν Σύρω εκδιδομένης Εφημερίδος ""Ηλίου"". Εν Ερμουπόλει Σύρου: Εκ του Τυπογραφείου των αδελφών Καμπάνη,1877.
- Newspaper "Εφημερίς", 4th Year, no. 11, January 11th 1877
- Newspaper "Ο Ελλήν:Λαός", no. 628, January 12th 1877
- Υπογραφές Αγωνιστών της Ελληνικής Επαναστἀσεως, Historical and Ethnological Society of Greece, Athens, 1998.
