= Name of Greece =

Overview of names for the European country

The name of Greece differs in Greek compared with the names used for the country in other languages and cultures, just like the names of the Greeks. The ancient and modern name of the country is Hellas or Hellada (Greek: Ελλάς, Ελλάδα; in polytonic: Ἑλλάς, Ἑλλάδα), and its official name is the Hellenic Republic, Helliniki Dimokratia (Ελληνική Δημοκρατία [eliniˈci ðimokraˈti.a]). In English, however, the country is usually called Greece, which comes from the Latin Graecia (as used by the Romans).

== Hellenes ==
The civilization and its associated territory and people, which is referred to in English as "Greece", have never referred to themselves in that term. They have rather called themselves 'Hellenes', adopting the traditional appellation of the Hellas region. This name has its origins in the mythological figure of Hellen, the son of Deucalion and Pyrrha, in an origin myth which has parallels to parts of the Book of Genesis. Hellen's father survived a great flood which Zeus caused to happen in order to wipe out humanity. Hellen himself became the founding father to all Greek tribes, begetting one from each of his sons: Aeolus the Aeolians, Dorus the Dorians, and Xuthus the Achaeans and Ionians through his son Ion.

== Ionians ==
Of those, the Ionians largely lived in Anatolia, aka Asia Minor, ergo the most in contact with the Asian world, so their ethnonym became commonly used for all of the Hellenes, to civilizations to east of Greece.

The name Yūnān (Persian: یونان) came through Old Persian during the Achaemenid Empire (550-333 BC). It was derived from the Old Persian Yauna for the Ionian Greeks (Ancient Greek: Ἰάονες, iāones), on the western coast of Asia Minor, who were the first Greeks to come into contact with the Persians. The term would eventually be applied to all the Greeks. Today, words derived from Yūnān can be found in Persian, Pashto, Turkish, Azerbaijani, Uzbek, Kurdish, Malay, Indonesian, Armenian (as Yūnānistan "land of Yūnān"; -istan "land" in Persian), Arabic, Hebrew (Biblical and Modern) (Yavan יָוָן), Aramaic (identical to Hebrew, but in Syriac abjad ܝܘܢ Yaw'n) and Kiswahili (as WaYunani, likely from Arabic, or perhaps Persian, as both languages have contributed vocabulary to the Swahili language).

Similarly, ancient China referred to the Hellenistic Greco-Bactrian Kingdom in Central Asia as Daxia (Tokhara, or Bactria), and the various city-state confederations around the Ferghana Valley as Dayuan, meaning "Great Ionians". Chinese contact was made first by Han Dynasty diplomat Zhang Qian in 139 BC during his mission to seek an anti-Xiongnu alliance with Greater Yuezhi. Zhang's report of the famous Ferghana horse led to Emperor Wu of Han sending further emissaries seeking trade, though frictions between the envoy and the rulers at Alexandria Eschate led to the War of the Heavenly Horses between the Chinese and the Ferghana confederations, and the eventual Chinese victory led to the establishment of the Protectorate of the Western Regions. The Hellenistic dominance was pushed out of Central Asia and remained further south as the Indo-Greek Kingdom, until eventually replaced by the expansion of Indo-Scythians and the Kushans.

== Greeks ==
The English name Greece and the similar adaptations in other languages derive from the Latin name Graecia (Greek: Γραικία), literally meaning 'the land of the Greeks', which was used by Ancient Romans to denote the area of modern-day Greece. Similarly, the Latin name of the nation was Graeci, which is the origin of the English name Greeks. Those names, in turn, trace their origin from Graecus, the Latin adaptation of the Greek name Γραικός (pl. Γραικοί), which means 'Greek'.

The Romans most likely called the country Graecia and its people Graeci after encountering the ancient tribe Graecians from the area of Boeotia, but the Greeks called their land Hellas and themselves Hellenes. Several other speculations have been made. William Smith notes in his Dictionary of Greek and Roman Geography that foreigners frequently refer to people by a different name (an exonym) from their native one (an endonym). Aristotle had the first surviving written use of the name Graeci (Γραικοί), in his Meteorology. He wrote that the area around Dodona and the Achelous River was inhabited by the Selli and a people, who had been called Graeci but were called Hellenes by his time. From that statement, it is asserted that the name of Graeci was once widely used in Epirus and the rest of the western coast of Greece. It thus became the name by which the Hellenes were known to the Italic peoples, who were on the opposite side of the Ionian Sea.

According to Hesiod, in his Catalogue of Women, Graecus was the son of Pandora and Zeus and gave his name to the people who followed the Hellenic customs. His brother Latinus gave his name to the Latins. Similarly, the eponymous Hellen is supposed to have given his name to the Greeks, or Hellenes.

In his Ethnica, Stephanus of Byzantium also states that Graecus, the son of Thessalus, was the origin of the name Graeci for the Hellenes.

== Romans ==
The eastern part of the Roman Empire, which was predominantly Greek-speaking, gave rise to the name Ῥωμανία (Rhomania or Romania). In fact, for a long time that started in Late Antiquity, the Greeks called themselves Ῥωμαῖοι (sg. Ῥωμαῖος: Romans). Those terms or related ones are still sometimes used even in Modern Greek: Ρωμιός (from Ῥωμαῖος), Ρωμιοσύνη.

There was tension with Western Europe on how Roman the western and the eastern parts of the Roman Empire really were. The historian Hieronymus Wolf, after the Eastern Roman Empire had ceased to exist, was the first to call it the Byzantine Empire, the term that later became usual in the West. However, because it lasted almost 1000 years longer than the Western Roman Empire, Persians, Arabs, and Turks, all in the East, used and sometimes still use terms from Rhomania or Rome, such as Rûm, to refer to its land or people.

== List of names in other languages ==
=== Hellas-derived names ===
The first major form, "Hellas" and its derivatives, is used by a few languages around the world, including Greek itself. In several European languages in which the normal term is derived from Graecia, names derived from Hellas exist as rare or poetic alternatives.

- Greek
  - Polytonic: Ἑλλάς, Ἑλλάδα (Hellas, Hellada)
  - Monotonic: Ελλάς, Ελλάδα (Ellas, Ellada)
- Aromanian: Elladhã
- Albanian: Elladhë (poetic, archaic, dialectal)
- Chinese: 希臘 (traditional), 希腊 (simplified) (pinyin: Xīlà; Jyutping: hei1 laap6)
- Vietnamese: Hy Lạp (希臘)
- Hawaiian: Helena
- Hungarian: Hellász (rare usage, mostly poetic)
- English: Hellas (rare usage, poetic)
- Norwegian (both Nynorsk and Bokmål): Hellas
- Italian: Ellade (rare usage)
- Korean: 희랍 (Huirap) (rare usage)
- Portuguese: Hélade (rare usage)
- Serbian Cyrillic: Хелада (Helada; archaic, poetic)
- Russian: Эллада (Ellada; poetic, ancient Greece)
- Spanish: Hélada, Hélade (rare usage)
- Bulgarian: Елада (latinized: Elada)
- Polish: Hellada (poetic)
- Romanian: Elada (archaic)

=== Ionia-derived names ===
The second major form, used in many languages and in which the common root is yun or ywn, is borrowed from the Greek name Ionia, the Ionian tribe region of Asia Minor, derived from Old Persian and meant for people with youthful appearances. In Greek, these forms have never normally been used to denote the whole Greek nation or Greece.

In Sanskrit literature in India, the word यवन yavana is derived from this origin and meant the people with youthful appearances. It was used specifically for Greek people until 250 BCE while Indian kingdoms often traded with Greece. After Alexander's invasion on western borders of India, the word took a new meaning as foreigner or invader. The word यवन yawan, meaning 'foreigner,' is still in use in languages like Hindi, Marathi and Malayalam.

- Arabic: اليونان (al-Yōnān, al-Yūnān)
- Aramaic: ܝܘܢ or יון (Yawān, Yawon)
- Armenian: Հունաստան (Hunastan)
  - Old Armenian: Յունաստան (Yunastan)
- Azerbaijani: Yunanıstan
- Hindustani (Hindi and Urdu): यूनान / یونان (Yūnān)
- Hebrew
  - Biblical: יָוָן (pronounced Yawan)
  - KJV Bible Medieval English corruption of Hebrew via European languages which pronounce J as Y): Javan
  - Modern: יוון (Yavan)
- Kurdish: Yunanistan (Simplified: Yonan/Yunan)
- Laz: Yonaneti-Xorumona (ჲონანეთი-ხორუმონა)
- Malay (Indonesian and Malaysian): Yunani
- Malayalam: യവനൻ (Yavanan)
- Persian: یونان (Yūnān)
- Pashto: یونان (Yūnān)
- Punjabi: ਯੂਨਾਨ / یونان (Yūnān)
- Sanskrit: यवन (Yavana)
- Tajik: Юнон (Yunon)
- Turkish: Yunanistan
- Urdu: یونآن (Yūnān)
- Uzbek: Yunoniston

=== Graecia-derived names ===
The third major form of names derives from the Latin Graecus and Graecia or their equivalent forms in Greek whence the former derive themselves. These terms have fallen out of use in Greek.

- Afrikaans: Griekeland
- Albanian: Greqia
- Aromanian: Gãrtsia
- Basque: Grezia
- Belarusian: Грэцыя (Hrecyja)
- Bengali: গ্রীস (Grīs)
- Bosnian: Grčka
- Bulgarian: Гърция (Gǎrtsiya)
- Catalan: Grècia
- Chechen: Греци (Gretsi)
- Cornish: Pow Grek
- Czech: Řecko
- Danish: Grækenland
- Dutch: Griekenland
- English: Greece
- Esperanto: Grekio/Grekujo/Greklando
- Estonian: Kreeka
- Filipino: Gresya
- Finnish: Kreikka
- French: Grèce
- Galician: Grecia
- German: Griechenland
- Haitian Creole: Grès
- Hungarian: Görögország
- Icelandic: Grikkland
- Irish: An Ghréig
- Italian: Grecia
- Japanese: ギリシャ (Girisha)
- Kannada: ಗ್ರೀಸ್ (Grīs)
- Kikuyu: Ngiriki
- Korean: 그리스 (Geuriseu)
- Latvian: Grieķija
- Lithuanian: Graikija
- Macedonian: Грција, Grcija
- Malagasy: Grisy
- Malayalam: ഗ്രീസ് (Grīs)
- Maltese: Greċja
- Māori: Kirihi
- Marathi: ग्रीस (Grīs)
- Mongolian: Грек / ᠭᠷᠧᠺ (Gryek)
- Nepali: ग्रीस (Grīs)
- Odia: ଗ୍ରୀସ (Grīs)
- Polish: Grecja
- Portuguese: Grécia
- Romanian: Grecia
- Russian: Греция (Gretsiya)
- Scots Gaelic: A 'Ghrèig
- Serbo-Croatian: Грчка, Grčka
- Sinhala: ග්රීසිය (Grisiya)
- Slovak: Grécko
- Slovenian: Grčija
- Spanish: Grecia
- Swahili: Ugiriki
- Swedish: Grekland
- Tamil: கிரேக்கம் (Kirēkkam)
- Telugu: గ్రీస్ (Grīs)
- Thai: กรีซ (Krit)
- Udmurt: Грециялэн (Gretsijalen)
- Ukrainian: Греція (Hretsiya)
- Welsh: Groeg
- West Frisian: Grikelân

=== Georgian name ===
The Georgian name for Greece is coined from the Georgian word "wise" brdzeni (Georgian: ბრძენი), thus saberdzneti would literally mean "land of the wise men", possibly referring to the Ancient Greek philosophy.

- Georgian: საბერძნეთი (Saberdzneti)
- Mingrelian: საბერძემო (Saberdzemo)

== Official name of the modern Greek state ==
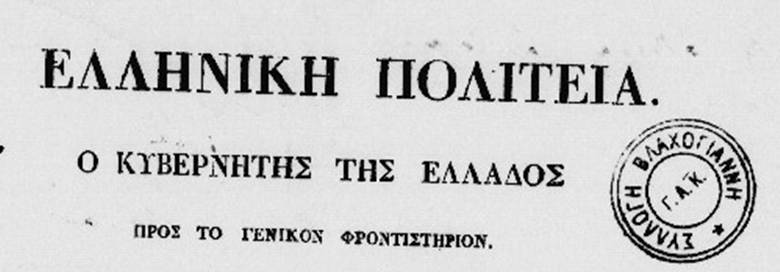
Government papers header "Hellenic State", 1828

From its establishment after the outbreak of the Greek War of Liberation in 1821, the modern Greek state has used a variety of official names, most often designating changes of regime. Internally, the country was called Hellas, not Greece, even in the cases below where the name was translated internationally as Greece.

- 1821–1828: "Provisional Administration of Greece" (Προσωρινή Διοίκησις τῆς Ἑλλάδος), used by the provisional government before the international recognition of Greek autonomy (and later independence) in the London Protocol.
- 1828–1832: "Hellenic State" (Ἑλληνική Πολιτεία), used under the governorship of Ioannis Kapodistrias. Along with the previous period, it is sometimes grouped together in the historiographic term "First Hellenic Republic".
- 1832–1924: "Kingdom of Greece" (Βασίλειον τῆς Ἑλλάδος), adopted after Greece was declared a monarchy in the London Conference of 1832, and retained until 15 May 1924, ten days before the abolition of the monarchy on 25 March 1924.
- 15 March to 28 May 1924: "Hellenic State" (Ἑλληνική Πολιτεία), initial but short-lived styling of the Second Hellenic Republic.
- 1924–1935: "Hellenic Republic" (Ἑλληνική Δημοκρατία), known historiographically as the Second Hellenic Republic, from 24 May 1924 (effective May 28) until the 10 October 1935 coup by Georgios Kondylis and the restoration of the monarchy. This change between "State" and "Republic" remains the sole case the name was rectified and did not reflect a regime change.
- 1935–1973: "Kingdom of Greece" (Βασίλειον τῆς Ἑλλάδος), from the restoration of the monarchy in 1935 to its abolition by the Regime of the Colonels junta on 1 June 1973. Between 1941–44 used by the internationally recognized Greek government in exile.
  - 1941–1944: "Hellenic State" (Ἑλληνική Πολιτεία), used by the collaborationist government of Greece during the occupation by the Axis powers in World War II.
- 1973–today: "Hellenic Republic" (Ελληνική Δημοκρατία), from the abolition of the monarchy by the military junta to the present day. However, the present Third Hellenic Republic is held to have begun in 1974, following the fall of the junta and the return of democratic rule.

== Bibliography ==
Primary sources

- Aristotle, Meteorology, online in the University of Adelaida Library
- Hesiod, Catalogue of Women, online in the Online Medieval & Classical Library
- Stephanus (1849). Meineke, Augustus (ed.). Ethnica (in Greek) (1849 ed.). Reimer.

Secondary sources

- Smith, William (1854). Dictionary of Greek and Roman Geography. Vol. 1. Little, Brown and Co.
- Smith, William (1849). Dictionary of Greek and Roman Biography and Mythology. Vol. 2. J. Walton.
