= Vincenzo Gallina =

Vincenzo Gallina (1795, Ravenna - 1842, Aleppo), was an Italian Carbonari, a liberal lawyer or merchant. After the Carbonari revolution in 1821 he was exiled and went to Greece with Lord Byron and Count Pietro Gamba, with whom he took part in the local war of independence of 1821. He collaborated with Alexandros Mavrokordatos and Theodoros Negris in drafting of the first Greek constitution, called the Provisional Constitution of Greece, which was approved on 1 January 1822 by the First National Assembly of Epidaurus of which he was a representative. This Constitution was inspired by the Constitution drawn up during the First French Republic. He later traveled to Egypt and finally to Syria, where he died in the capital Aleppo at the age of 47.
