= Greek Constitution of 1823 =

Greek Constitution of 1823 is the second constitutional text adopted during the Greek War of Independence, which started in 1821. In the spring of 1823 (March–April),the 2nd National Assembly took place. It adopted the new constitution, named "Law of Epidauros" (Νόμος της Επιδαύρου). This was a difficult period, just before the beginning of the first bitter civil war during the Revolution.

== Articles and sections ==
The Constitution of 1823 comprises 99 articles and it consists of seven sections:

- Section Α': About the religion.
- Section Β': About the civil rights of the Greeks.
- Section Γ': About the function of the Administration.
- Section Δ': About the duties of the Legislative Body.
- Section Ε': About the duties of the Executive Body.
- Section ΣΤ': About the deputies.
- Section Ζ': About the Judicial Branch.

== Dissolution of the local legislative bodies and abolishing the position of the Commander in Chief ==
Basically, the Constitution of 1823 has the same structure with the Constitution of 1822. The provisions for the human rights are more extended and the function of the justice is regulated in a more detailed way. Petrobey Mavromichalis was re-elected as president of the Executive Body. The 2nd Assembly dissolved all the local legislative bodies and repealed the title of the "High Commander in Chief", which was previously attributed to Theodoros Kolokotronis.

== Infuence from the American constitution and the American Declaration of Independence ==
The Greek Constitution of 1823 made direct reference to the American Constitution as its inspiration and included as amendments full Greek translations of the 1776 American Declaration of Independence and the American Constitution.
