= Fifth National Assembly at Nafplion =

Greek national assembly

The Fifth National Assembly (Greek: Εʹ Εθνοσυνέλευση) of the Greeks convened at Argos on 5 December 1831, before relocating to Nafplion in early 1832.

The Assembly, the last of a series of similar conventions of the Greek War of Independence, approved the selection, by the Great Powers, of the Bavarian prince Otto as King of Greece. On 15 March 1832, it adopted a new constitution, titled the "Political Constitution of Greece" (Πολιτικόν Σύνταγμα της Ελλάδος) and often referred to as the "Hegemonic Constitution" (Ηγεμονικόν Σύνταγμα). In the event, the assembly disbanded soon after, due to the intense differences among its members. After Otto's arrival in February 1833, the constitution was ignored by the Regency which exercised government until 1835, and after that by Otto himself, who ruled as an absolute monarch. Independent Greece received its first constitution only after the 3 September 1843 Revolution.
