= Greek Constitution of 1927 =

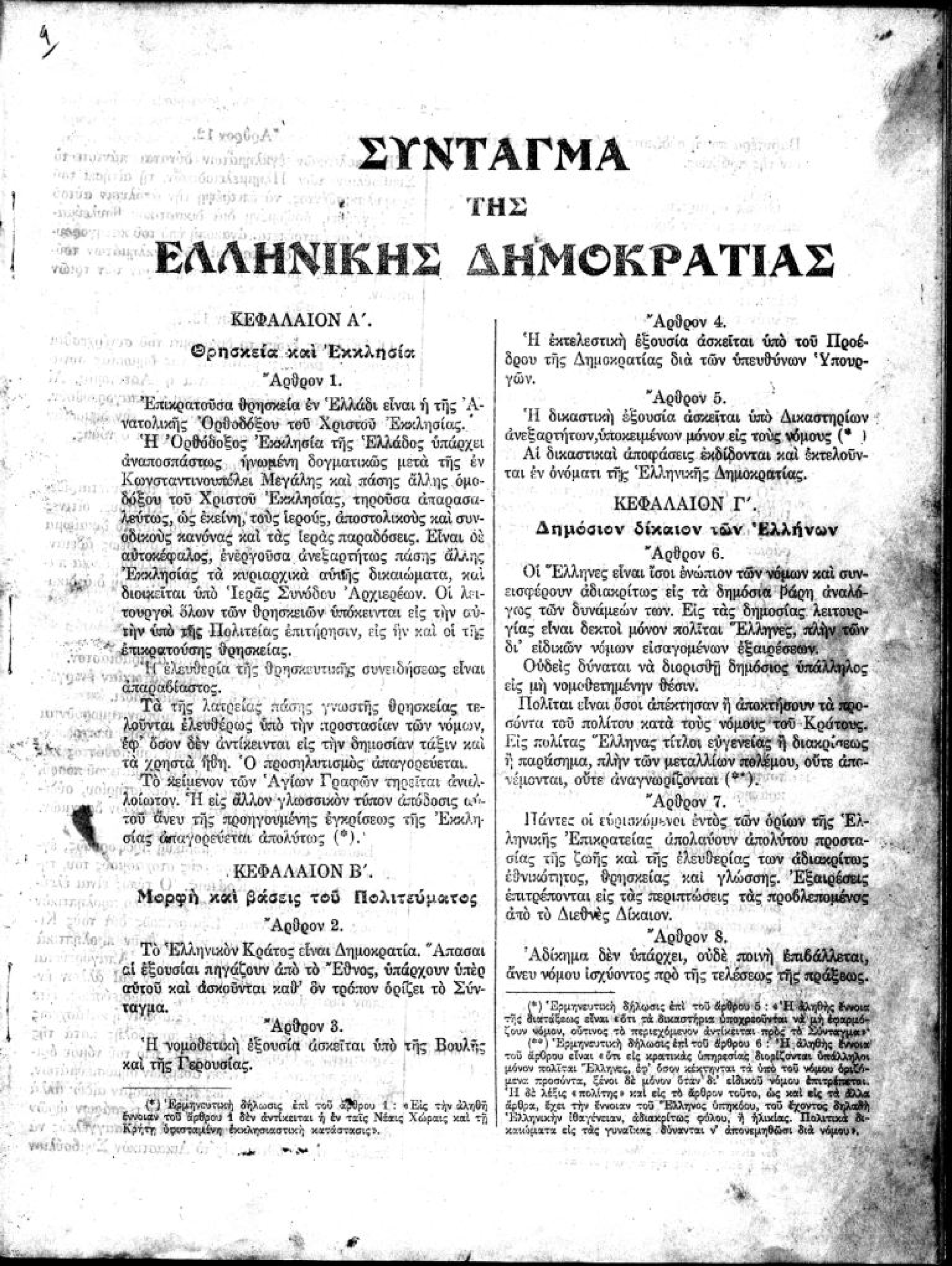
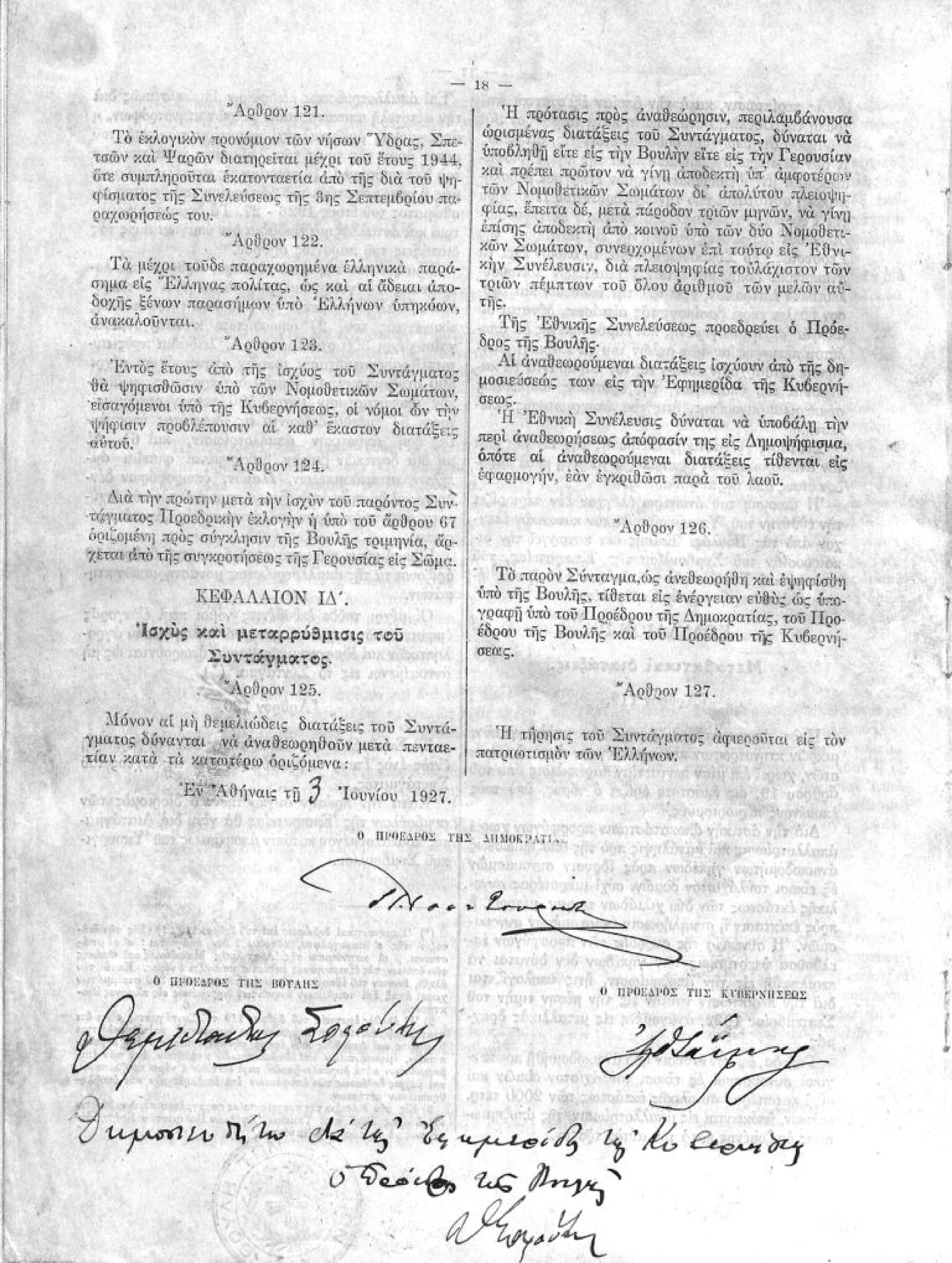
The first and last pages of the Constitution of 3 June 1927

The Greek Constitution of 1927 was the constitution in force during most of the Second Hellenic Republic (1924–1935). The Republic had been declared in 1924, but the proposed 1925 constitution was never put into practice due to the dictatorship of Theodoros Pangalos in 1925–26. After Pangalos was overthrown, a new constitution was drawn up, which relied on, but heavily amended the previous 1911 constitution in several places.

== Contents ==
The new 1927 constitution had 127 articles. Any reference to the Greek monarchy was removed, and a parliamentary republic, with a bicameral legislature and an elected president as ceremonial head of state were introduced. Most notably, for the first time the hitherto unwritten principle of parliamentary majority (dedilomeni) was formalized. The constitution of 1927 was suspended in October 1935, when a military coup under Georgios Kondylis overthrew the Republic and restored the monarchy, bringing back the 1911 constitution into force. Elements of the 1927 constitution nevertheless found their way into the Greek Constitution of 1952.
