= Greek Constitution of 1911 =

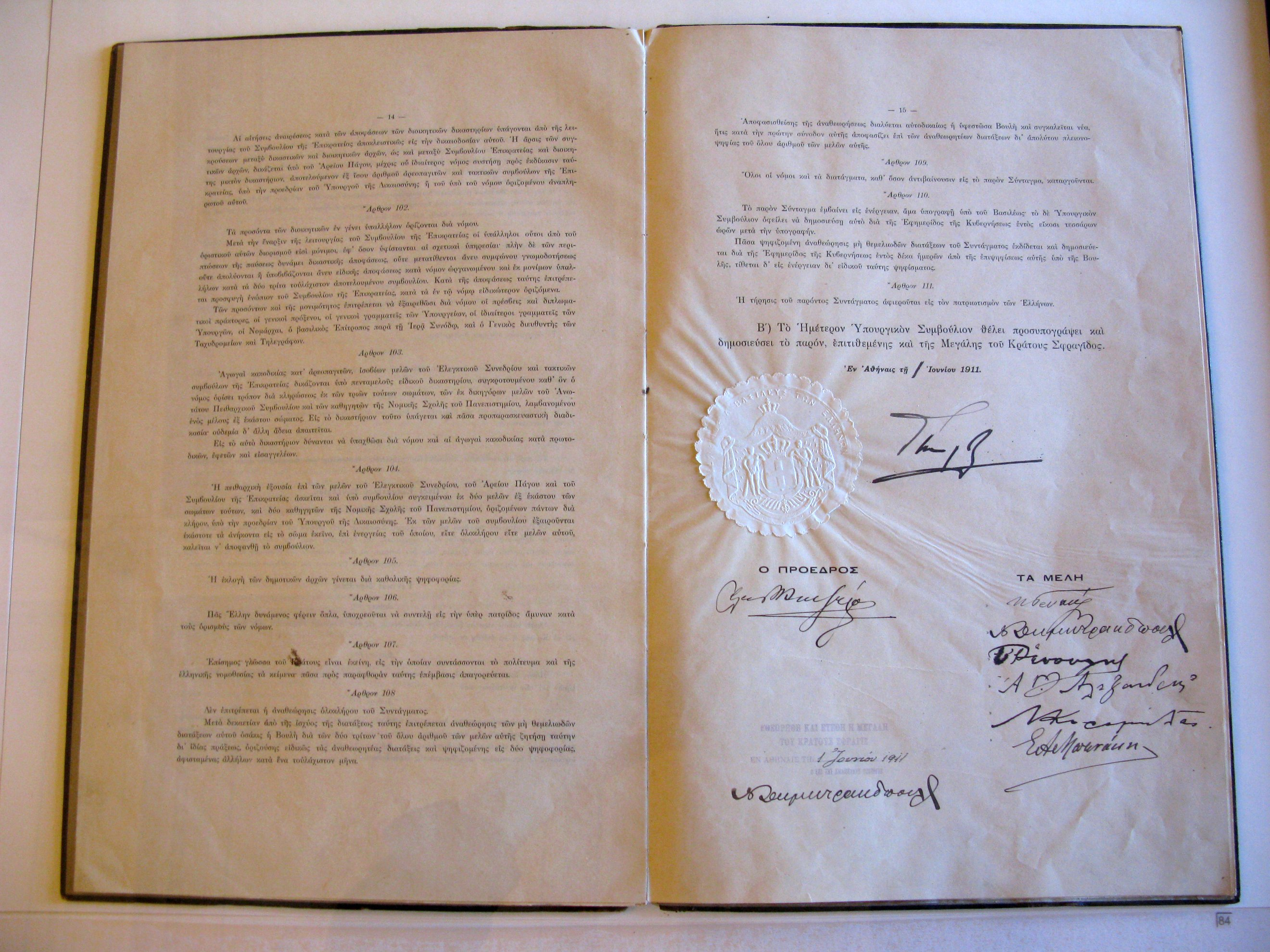
The Greek Constitution of 1911.

The Greek Constitution of 1911 was a major step forward in the constitutional history of Greece. Following the rise to power of Eleftherios Venizelos after the Goudi revolt in 1909, Venizelos set about attempting to reform the state. The main outcome of this was a major revision to the Greek Constitution of 1864.

== Human rights and land reform ==
The most noteworthy amendments to the Constitution of 1864 concerning the protection of human rights, were the more effective protection of personal security, equality in tax burdens, of the right to assemble and of the inviolability of the domicile. Furthermore, the Constitution facilitated expropriation to allocate property to landless farmers, while judicially protecting property rights.

== Free education and establishment of Katharevousa as an official language ==
Other important changes included the institution of an Electoral Court for the settlement of election disputes stemming from the parliamentary elections, the addition of new conflicts for MPs, the re-establishment of the State Council as the highest administrative court (which, however, was constituted and operated only under the Constitution of 1927), the improvement of the protection of judicial independence and the establishment of the non-removability of public employees. Finally, for the first time, the Constitution provided for mandatory and free education for all, and declared Katharevousa (i.e. archaising "purified" Greek) as the "official language of the Nation".
