= 1935 Greek monarchy referendum =

- 3 November 1935

Results
| Choice | Votes | % |
|---|---|---|
| Yes | 1,491,992 | 97.87% |
| No | 32,454 | 2.13% |
| Valid votes | 1,524,446 | 99.79% |
| Invalid or blank votes | 3,268 | 0.21% |
| Total votes | 1,527,714 | 100.00% |

A referendum on restoring the monarchy was held in Greece on 3 November 1935. The proposal was approved by nearly 97.9% of voters, although the conduct of the referendum was far from free or fair. George II returned from exile and was restored to the throne on 25 November 1935.

== Background ==
After the defeat of Greece by the Turkish National Movement (the "Asia Minor Disaster" of 1922), the defeated army revolted against the royal government. King Constantine I was forced to abdicate in 1922, and died in exile in 1923. His eldest son and successor, King George II, was soon after asked by the parliament to leave Greece so the nation could decide what form of government it should adopt. In a 1924 referendum, Greeks voted to create a republic.

In 1935, Prime Minister Georgios Kondylis, a former pro-Venizelos military officer, became the most powerful political figure in Greece. On 10 October, he compelled Panagis Tsaldaris to resign as Prime Minister and took over the government, suspending many constitutional provisions in the process. Kondylis, who had now joined the Conservatives, decided to hold a referendum in order to re-establish the monarchy, despite the fact that he used to be a supporter of the anti-monarchist wing of Greek politics.

The referendum was scheduled to take place on 3 November per resolution "on the abolition of the republic" of 10 October 1935 (ΦΕΚ Α΄ 456).

== Conduct ==
Observers of the time raised concerns about the legitimacy of the election. In addition to the abnormally high "for" vote, the vote was held in far-from-secret circumstances. Voters dropped a blue piece of paper into the ballot box if they supported the king's return, or a red paper to retain the republic. Anyone who cast a vote to retain the republic risked intimidation or assault.

== Results ==
| Choice | Votes | % |
|---|---|---|
| For | 1,491,992 | 97.87 |
| Against | 32,454 | 2.13 |
| Total | 1,524,446 | 100.00 |
| Valid votes | 1,524,446 | 99.79 |
| Invalid/blank votes | 3,268 | 0.21 |
| Total votes | 1,527,714 | 100.00 |
Source: Nohlen & Stöver
