= Greek Constitution of 1822 =

First constitution of modern Greece

The Greek Constitution of 1822 was a document adopted by the First National Assembly of Epidaurus on 1 January 1822. Formally it was the Provisional Regime of Greece (Greek: Προσωρινό Πολίτευμα της Ελλάδος), sometimes translated as Temporary Constitution of Greece. Considered to be the first constitution of Modern Greece, it was an attempt to achieve temporary governmental and military organisation until the future establishment of a national parliament.

== Replacement of texts adopted by the local revolutionary committees, avoiding the liberal principles of the French and American constitutions ==
"All the indigenous inhabitants of the Greek Territory who believe in Christ are Greeks."

— sector Β, paragraph Β

The Constitution replaced a number of texts which had been passed by local revolutionary committees, such as the Senate Organization of Western Greece, the Legal Order of Eastern Greece and the Peloponnesian Senate Organization. These committees had formed the previous year, which saw the outbreak of the Greek War of Independence. The Constitution was mainly the work of the Italian Vincenzo Gallina and deliberately avoided the liberal and democratic principles of the French revolutionary constitutions of 1793 and 1795, as well as the 1787 constitution of the United States. This was done in order to not alarm the Holy Alliance. For the same reason, there was no reference in the Constitution to the Filiki Eteria.

== Unclear distinction between the duties of the deliberative and executive bodies ==
As far as the formation of two organs of the administration is concerned, a multi-central model was adopted with the composition of two annual bodies (deliberative and executive) which had unclearly defined and separated duties. This declaration took the official form of a constitutional text; this is the Constitution of Epidauros, the first constitution in the modern history of Greece.

== Parts and articles ==
The constitution was divided into four parts and 109 articles:

- Part I dealt with the religious and civil rights of the Greeks and ruled on the predominance of the Greek Orthodox Church and regulated certain important human rights.
- Part II dealt with administrative issues
- Part III outlined the duties of the legislature
- Part IV outlined the duties of the executive

== Political compromise between military leaders and landowners, gridlock in lawmaking ==
The constitution is regarded as liberal and democratic, although it represented a compromise between the military leaders of the Revolution and the landowners, who dominated the First National Assembly. The creation of an executive and a legislature displays the desire of these two power centres to maintain a political balance. The constitutional equivalence between the legislature and the executive reflects the suspiciousness among the members of the National Assembly and resulted in the paralysis of the law-making procedure. In any case, the needs and the difficulties of the revolution impeded the full implementation of the Constitution.
