= Greek Constitution of 1864 =

The Second National Assembly of the Hellenes took place in Athens (1863–1864) and dealt both with the election of a new sovereign as well as with the drafting of a new Constitution, thereby implementing the transition from constitutional monarchy to a crowned republic.

== George I as a constitutional monarch ==
Following the refusal of Prince Alfred of Great Britain (who was elected by an overwhelming majority in the first referendum of the country in November 1862) to accept the crown of the Kingdom of Greece, the government offered the crown to the Danish prince George Christian Willem of the House of Schleswig-Holstein-Sonderburg-Glücksburg, who was crowned constitutional King of Greece under the name "George I, King of the Hellenes".

== Belgian and Danish influences on the constitution ==
The Constitution of 1864 was drafted following the models of the Constitutions of Belgium of 1831 and of Denmark of 1849, and established in clear terms the principle of popular sovereignty, since the only legislative body with reversionary powers was now the Parliament. Furthermore, article 31 reiterated that all the powers stemmed from the Nation and were to be exercised as provided by the Constitution, while article 44 established the principle of accountability, taking into consideration that the King only possessed the powers that were bestowed on him by the Constitution and by the laws applying the same.

== Abolition of the Senate ==
The Assembly chose the system of a single chamber Parliament (Βουλή) with a four-year term, and hence abolished the Senate, which many had accused of being a tool in the hands of the monarchy. Direct, secret and universal elections was adopted as the manner to elect the MPs, while elections were to be held simultaneously throughout the entire nation.

== Provisions for the military service of MPs ==
In addition, article 71 introduced a conflict between being an MP and a salaried public employee or mayor at the same time, but not with serving as an army officer.

== The king's rights ==
The Constitution reiterated various clauses found in the Constitution of 1844, such as that the King appoints and dismisses the ministers and that the latter are responsible for the person of the monarch, but it also allowed for the Parliament to establish "examination committees". Moreover, the King preserved the right to convoke the Parliament in ordinary as well as in extraordinary sessions, and to dissolve it at his discretion, provided, however, that the dissolution decree was also countersigned by the Cabinet.

The Constitution did not draw a clear line between the powers of the king and those of Parliament. This was a problem common with most constitutional monarchies. The framers of the 1864 Constitution intended to put most of the power in the hands of Parliament. However, it was possible for a monarch to have more influence on the government than the plain language of the Constitution stipulated.

For example, the 1864 Constitution repeated verbatim the clause of article 24 of its 1844 predecessor, which stipulated that "The King appoints and removes his Ministers". This phrase insinuated that the ministers were practically subordinate to the monarch, and were thereby responsible to both him and Parliament. Moreover, nowhere was it explicitly stated in the Constitution that the King was obliged to appoint a government that conformed to the will of the majority in Parliament. However, the modernizing political forces of the time believed that the principle of popular sovereignty and the spirit of parliamentary rule meant that a monarch should not be able to appoint a government entirely of his own choosing or keep it in office against the will of Parliament. They finally succeeded in imposing it through the principle of "manifest confidence" of the Parliament, which was expressed in 1875 by Charilaos Trikoupis and which, that same year, in his Crown Speech, King George I expressly stated: "I demand as a prerequisite, of all that I call beside me to assist me in governing the country, to possess the manifest confidence and trust of the majority of the Nation's representatives. Furthermore, I accept this approval to stem from the Parliament, as without it the harmonious functioning of the polity would be impossible".

== Impact ==
The establishment of the principle of "manifest confidence" towards the end of the first decade of the crowned democracy, contributed towards the disappearance of a constitutional practice which, in many ways, reiterated the negative experiences of the period of the reign of King Otto. Indeed, from 1864 through 1875 numerous elections of dubious validity had taken place, while, additionally and most importantly, there was an active involvement of the Throne in political affairs through the appointment of governments enjoying a minority in Parliament, or through the forced resignation of majority governments, when their political views clashed with those of the crown.
