= 1924 Greek republic referendum =

- 13 April 1924

Results
Choice	Votes	%
Yes	758,472	69.98%
No	325,322	30.02%
Valid votes	1,083,794	99.97%
Invalid or blank votes	291	0.03%
Total votes	1,084,085	100.00%

A referendum on remaining a republic was held in Greece on 13 April 1924. It followed the catastrophic outcome of the Asia Minor Campaign. As a result of the military defeat, King Constantine I was forced to abdicate (27 September 1922) in favor of his son, King George II. King George himself later went into exile in the Kingdom of Romania, the home of his wife Elisabeth of Romania, while the government debated the fate of the monarchy. Ultimately, a referendum was called. This followed the restoration of Constantine I in 1920 and reflected the see-saw nature of the Greek electorate and the then-present dominance of the Liberal and Republican Venizelists in Greek politics and abolished the crown.

In the lead up to the referendum, Prime Minister Alexandros Papanastasiou favoured the vote for the Republic, while Venizelos kept a neutral stance. Nonetheless, on 25 March 1924 the Second Hellenic Republic was proclaimed by parliament.

== Results ==
Choice	Votes	%
For	758,472	69.98
Against	325,322	30.02
Total	1,083,794	100.00
Valid votes	1,083,794	99.97
Invalid/blank votes	291	0.03
Total votes	1,084,085	100.00
Source: Nohlen & Stöver
