= Greek Constitution of 1844 =

First constitution of the Kingdom of Greece

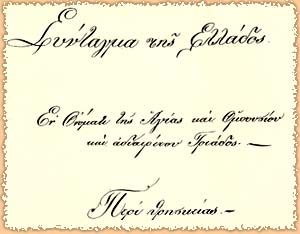
In the name of the Holy, Consubstantial and Indivisible Trinity...are the first words of the Greek Constitution of 1844.

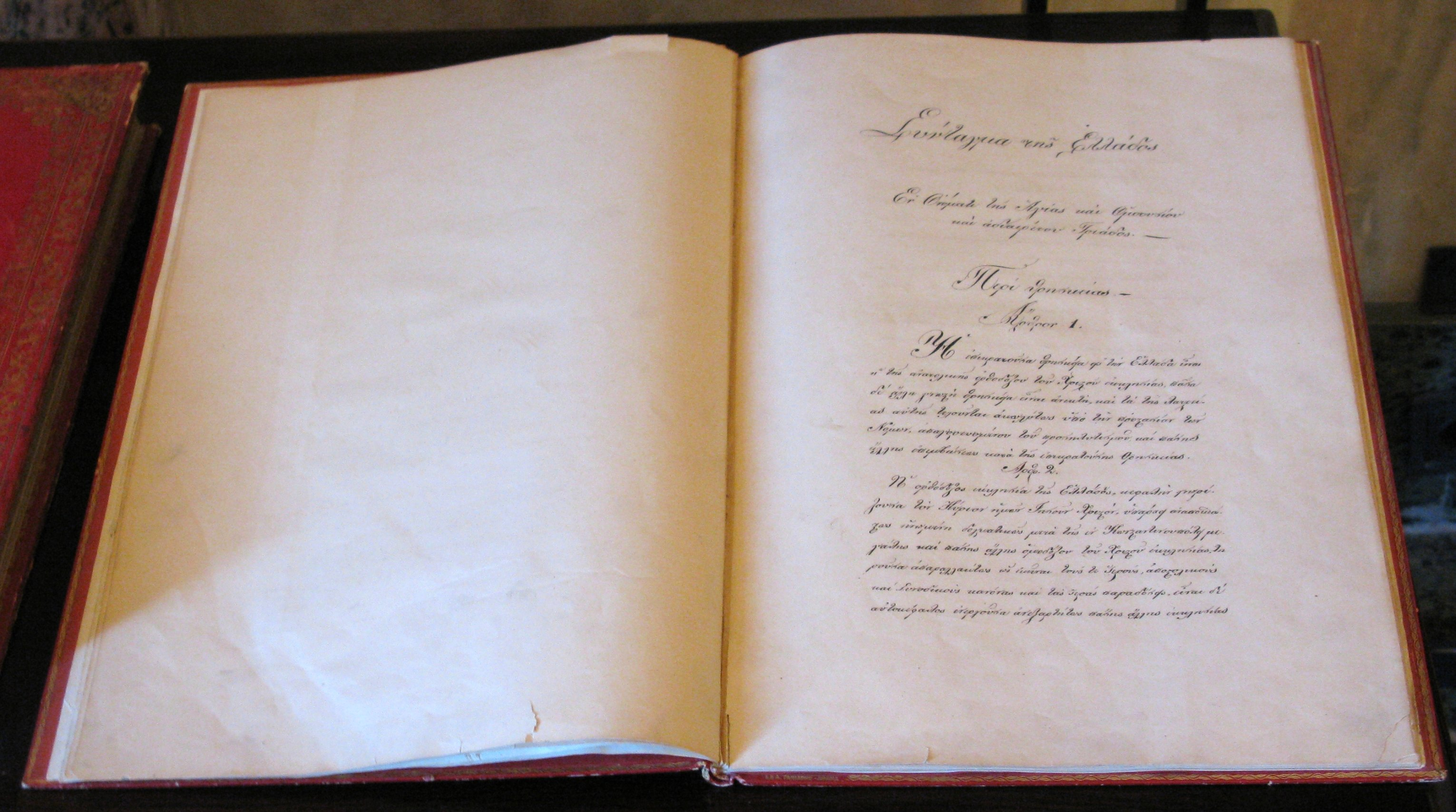
The Greek Constitution of 1844

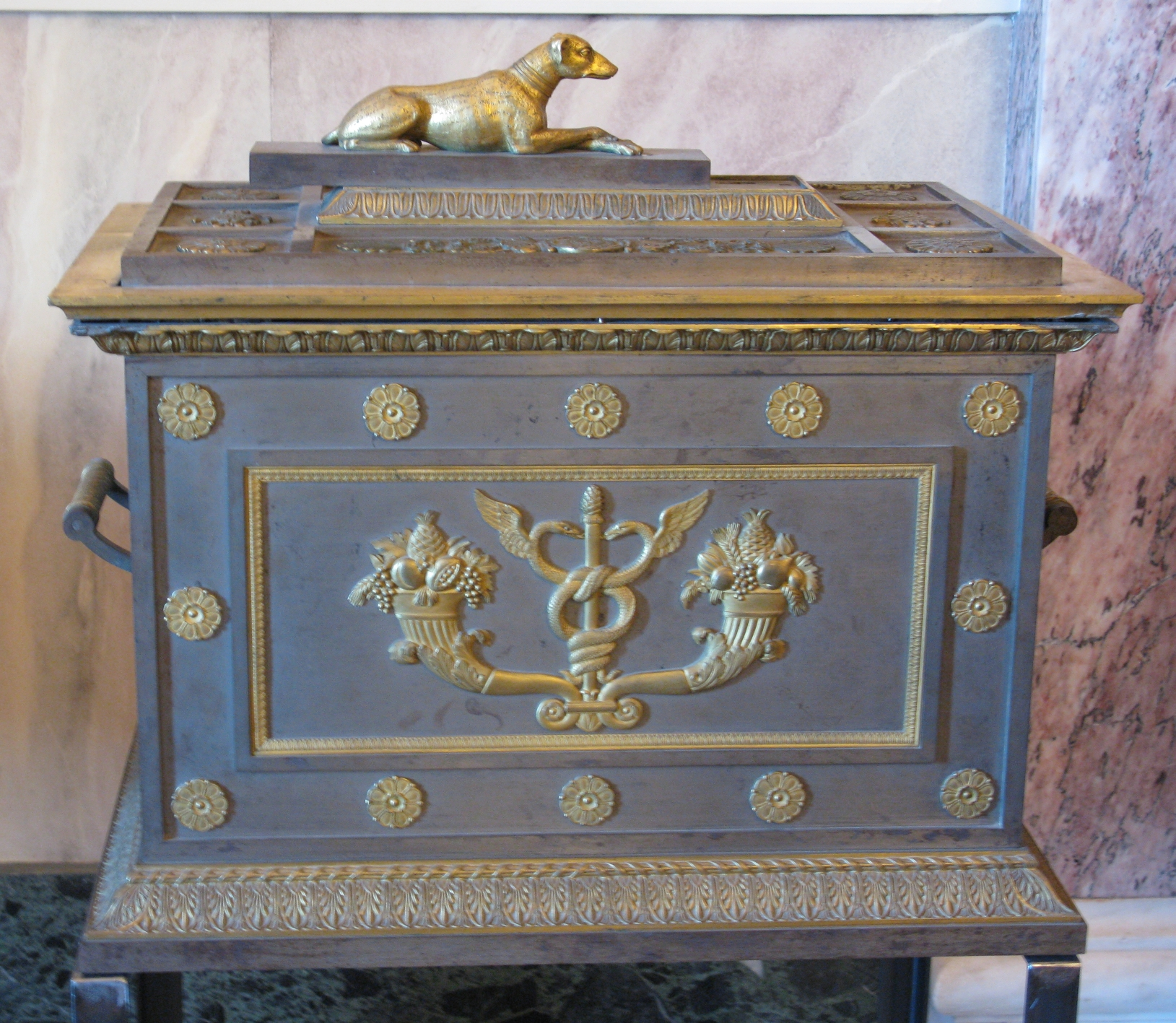
The box the Constitution of 1844 was kept in.

The first constitution of the Kingdom of Greece was the Greek Constitution of 1844. On 3 September 1843, the military garrison of Athens, with the help of citizens, rebelled and demanded from King Otto the concession of a Constitution.

== Establishment on constitutional monarchy and influence from the constitutions of France and Belgium ==
The Constitution that was proclaimed in March 1844 came from the workings of the "Third of September National Assembly of the Hellenes in Athens" and was a Constitutional Pact, in other words a contract between the monarch and the Nation. This Constitution re-established the constitutional monarchy and was based on the French Constitution of 1830 and the Belgian Constitution of 1831.

== Legislative power ==
Its main provisions were the following: It established the principle of monarchical sovereignty, as the monarch was the decisive power of the State; the legislative power was to be exercised by the King - who also had the right to ratify the laws - by the Parliament, and by the Senate. The members of the Parliament could be no less than 80 and they were elected for a three-year term by universal suffrage. The senators were appointed for life by the King and their number was set at 27, although that number could increase should the need arise and per the monarch's will, but it could not exceed half the number of the members of Parliament.

== Appointments of ministers and judges by the king ==
The ministers' responsibility for the King's actions is established, who also appoints and removes them. Justice stems from the King and is dispensed in his name by the judges he himself appoints.

== Manhood suffrage ==
Lastly, this Assembly voted the electoral law of 18 March 1844, which was the first European law to provide, in essence, for manhood suffrage.

== Violation of the constitution by Otto and consequent deposition ==
Despite the fact that Otto accepted the establishment of a Constitutional regime, he was not inclined to enforce it and by breaking both the spirit and the letter of the Constitution he tried to gather as much power as he possibly could. On the night of 10 October 1862 the rising wave of discontent led the people and the military to rebel and to decide Otto's deposition.
