= Election to the Throne of Greece (1822–1832) =

Election of a monarch for newly independent Greece

Election to the Throne of Greece (1822-1832)
- The coat of arms of King Otto I of Greece.
- Date: 1822–1832
- Location: Greek and Europe
- Motive: Creation of the Kingdom of Greece and election of Prince Otto of Bavaria to the Greek crown. Establishment of a Regency Council.

The search for a candidate for the throne of Greece began soon after the start of the Greek War of Independence against the Ottoman Empire (1821–1829) and concluded two years after the international recognition of the country's independence in 1830, and was a pivotal moment in Greek history. The conflict was significantly shaped by the involvement of major European powers, namely the United Kingdom, Russia, and France, as well as internecine Greek conflicts during and after the War of Independence.

From the outset of the Greek War of Independence, the leaders of the rebellion recognized that the major European powers, collectively known as the "Conservative Order" that emerged from the Congress of Vienna, would only acknowledge Greece's independence if it adopted a monarchical form of government. Consequently, the Greeks endeavored to identify a foreign prince who would be amenable to assuming governance of their nation, a prospect that piqued the interest of several ambitious contenders. However, the discord among the powers and the insurgents' precarious position against the Ottoman forces made the election impossible for an extended period.

As the Greek rebellion waned around 1825-1826, the international impact of the fall of Missolonghi prompted the major powers to intervene militarily in the conflict and gradually recognize Greece's independence. By the end of 1827, Greece had been practically liberated from Ottoman rule. However, the Greek people were not consulted in the royal election, which was conducted by the powers that had taken charge of the matter. Initially reluctant to accept a foreign-imposed monarchy, the Greek people ultimately welcomed the arrival of an independent sovereign to unify the young nation.

The initial candidate proposed by the powers was Prince Leopold of Saxe-Coburg, the son-in-law of King George IV of the United Kingdom. He was initially inclined to accept the honor, but ultimately declined the Greek crown due to the indecisiveness of Governor Ioannis Kapodistrias, leader of the Greek government, and the refusal of European governments to guarantee more favorable borders for Greece. Subsequently, other candidates were considered, but the Revolutions of 1830 resulted in the election becoming a less prominent priority for the chancelleries of the major powers. It was not until several months later that the name of the second son of King Louis I of Bavaria was proposed.

At the age of 17, the prince was subject to a regency imposed by the Fifth Greek National Assembly and the major powers. He finally ascended to the Greek throne as King Otto I in 1832, marking the beginning of the Kingdom of Greece. This period was characterised by a regime that was close to absolutism.

== Background: the Greek Revolution and Europe of the Holy Alliance ==
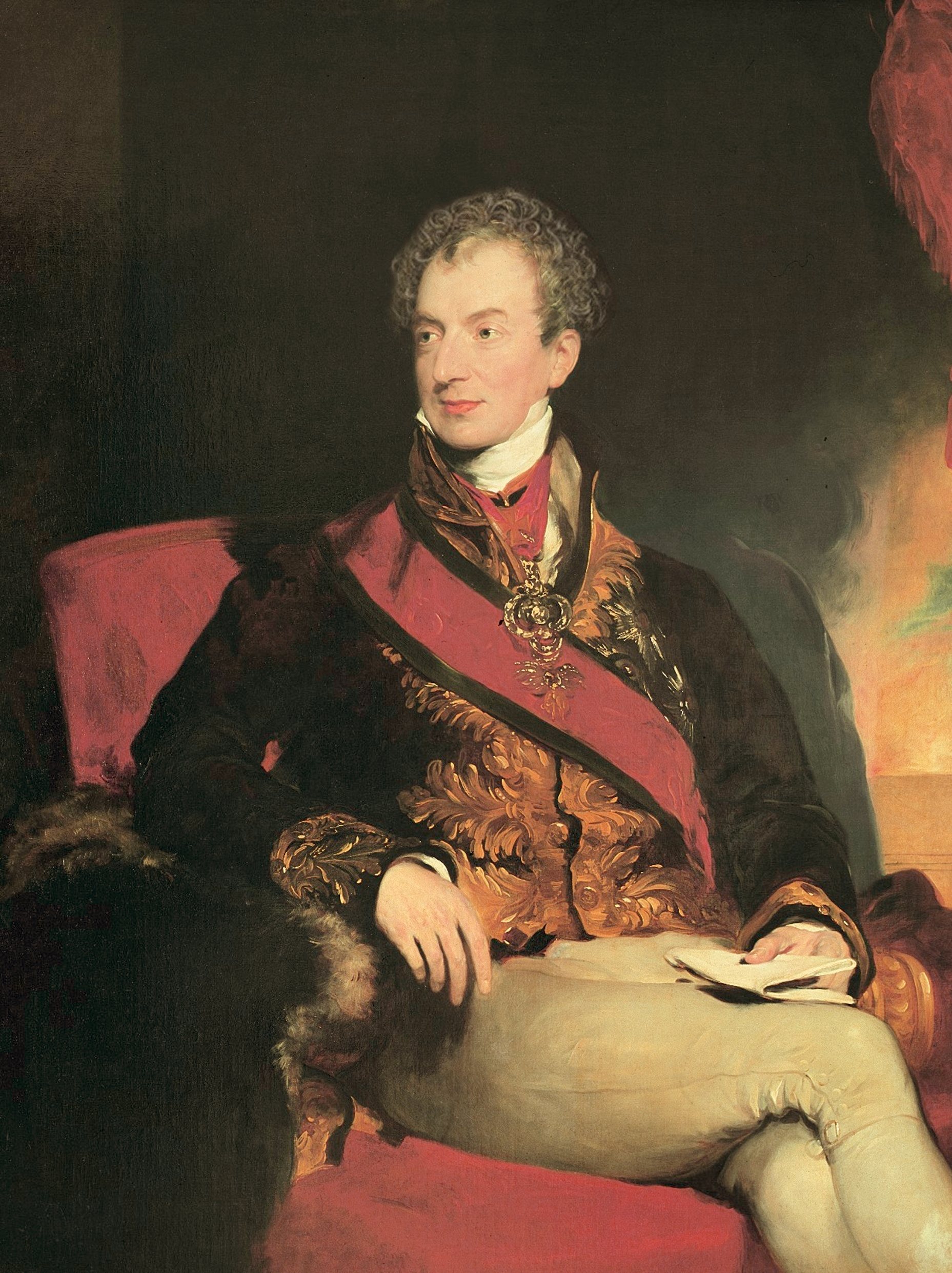
Prince Klemens von Metternich (portrait by Sir Thomas Lawrence) was one of the main architects of the Holy Alliance.

In the aftermath of the Congress of Vienna in 1815, the European continent was largely dominated by the Holy Alliance. Initially constituted by three of the four major states that had participated in the destruction of the Napoleonic Empire (Russia, Austria, and Prussia), the Holy Alliance subsequently extended its membership to include other countries, such as France under the rule of Louis XVIII in 1818.

The Holy Alliance was established to maintain equilibrium within Europe and prevent the recurrence of revolutionary upheavals. However, it rapidly evolved into a mechanism for preserving absolutism. The influence of Austrian Chancellor Klemens von Metternich resulted in the assertion of the "right of intervention [of foreign armies] if the internal situation of a state threatens the peace of its neighbors", which transformed the alliance into a counter-revolutionary entity and guarantor of the Conservative Order. Insurrections and national aspirations contrary to the maintenance of this status quo were suppressed by this alliance. In 1821, the Congress of Laibach legitimized the intervention of Austrian armies in the kingdoms of the Two Sicilies and Piedmont-Sardinia to suppress revolutionary movements. Two years later, in 1823, the Congress of Verona tasked the French army under the Duke of Angoulême with leading the Spanish expedition to overthrow the liberal Spanish government and restore the absolutist power of King Ferdinand VII.

In this profoundly reactionary context, the uprising in the Danubian Principalities (Moldavia and Wallachia), then under Ottoman suzerainty, by the troops of Alexander Ypsilantis (February-June 1821) and then the insurrection of Greece (from March 1821) and the declaration of the country's independence at the Congress of Epidaurus (1 January 1822) were initially perceived as threats to European stability. However, as the war in the Peloponnese and elsewhere continued, the stance of the major powers shifted. The Treaty of London of 6 July 1827, saw the Russian, French, and British governments move away from the influence of Metternich and the Holy Alliance, instead intervening in support of the Greek insurgents.

Nevertheless, the gradual acceptance of an autonomous government in Greece by the powers did not mean a consent to the establishment of a republican regime in the country. Therefore, it quickly became a question of finding a ruler for Greece within the great family of European monarchies. Moreover, many Greeks, from Adamantios Korais to Theodoros Kolokotronis, feared that their movement would be associated with Carbonarism. Candidates for the Greek throne (with the exception of a Bonaparte) were thus seen, even within Greece, as the best defense against this suspicion of Carbonarism.

== Before independence ==
=== Early efforts ===
==== From Catherine II's Dream to the First Greek Projects ====
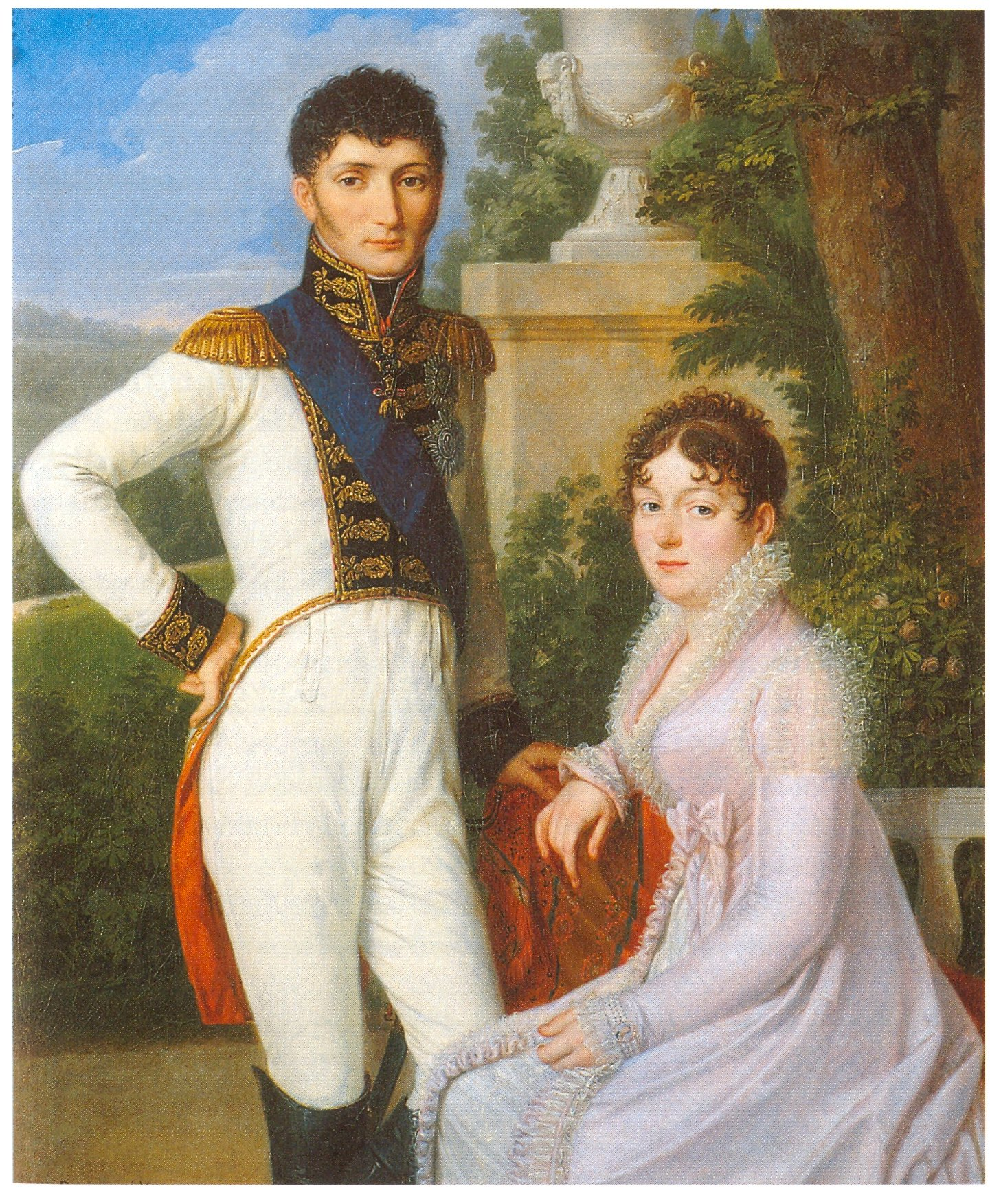
Jérôme Bonaparte and his wife Princess Catharina of Württemberg, painting by Sebastian Weygandt (1810)

The concept of restoring Greece's independence and transforming it into a kingdom was not a novel one. During the Russo-Turkish War of 1787-1792, Empress Catherine II endeavored to establish her second grandson, Grand Duke Constantine Pavlovich, as the ruler of a restored Byzantine Empire in the so-called "Greek Plan". Subsequently, Napoleon Bonaparte postulated the recreation of the Byzantine Empire and the appointment of a member of his own family as its leader. In 1815, the Congress of Vienna contemplated the transformation of the Ionian Islands into an autonomous principality under the governance of Eugène de Beauharnais.

Nevertheless, it was the Greek War of Independence that rendered the establishment of an autonomous Greek monarchy a viable proposition. As early as 1822, the Greek politician Theodoros Negris proposed to the National Assembly of Epidaurus that Jérôme Bonaparte, brother of Napoleon and former King of Westphalia, be appointed King of Greece. However, Executive Council president Alexandros Mavrokordatos advanced an opposing viewpoint, emphasizing that the Holy Alliance would never countenance the return of a Bonaparte to a European throne, and that electing the former king would inevitably provoke the ire of Napoleon's victors.

Shortly after opposing Negris' proposal, however, Mavrokordatos dispatched an emissary to Munich, Bavaria, to meet Napoleon's stepson, Prince Eugène de Beauharnais, and offer him the Greek crown. The project was ultimately unsuccessful due to Eugène's death of apoplexy in 1824.

==== Candidacy of the Duke of Nemours ====
In the European courts, the notion of a new throne piqued the interest of some enterprising princes. In France, the Duke of Orléans (the future Louis Philippe I) sought to capitalize on the opportunity to crown his second son, the young Duke of Nemours. (Note: At the time, the Duke of Bordeaux, the sole heir of the senior branch of the Bourbons following the Count of Artois and the Duke of Angoulême, was only two years of age. Consequently, for the Orléans, the Duke of Chartres, the eldest son of the Duke of Orléans, was well positioned within the line of succession to the French throne. This is why his father did not propose him to the Greeks as a sovereign (Teyssier 2006, pp. 42 & 116-117).) In February 1824, the Duke of Orléans sent a letter to Mavrokordatos and the Greek government through the intermediary of former Loiret deputy Laisné de Villévêque. In this missive, he warned the Greek government of the dangers that a republic would inevitably bring to Greece and attempted to persuade them of the benefits of a monarchy under a Capetian prince. Given that his son was only ten years of age, the Duke of Orléans put forth the proposal of raising the child in his adoptive country, within the Eastern Orthodox religion and the Greek language, while a regency would oversee the governance of the kingdom.

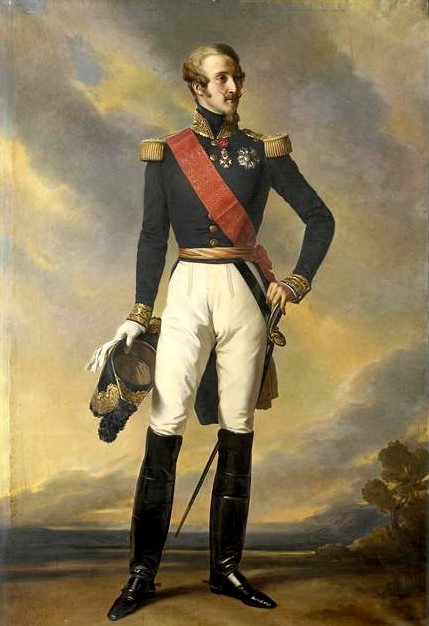
The Duke of Nemours (adult) by Franz Xaver Winterhalter.

In a statement, the Duke of Orléans asserted that the arrival of the Duke of Nemours in Greece would be readily accepted by the major powers, contingent upon the provision of certain commercial advantages. The United Kingdom would be gratified by the establishment of a state that would counterbalance Russian influence in the Eastern Mediterranean. Furthermore, the presence of a prince with both French and Neapolitan ancestry (Note: The Duchess of Orléans was the daughter of King Ferdinand I of the Two Sicilies (Teyssier 2006, p. 39).) in Greece would encourage the arrival of new European volunteers to fight alongside the insurgents, while the Duke himself could provide the financial resources for the creation of several cavalry regiments.

In response to his correspondent's urgings, Mavrokordatos sought to implement the election of the young prince, to present Europe with a fait accompli. However, he refrained from acting hastily and instead requested guarantees from the Duke of Orléans regarding the French government's sentiments on the matter. Nevertheless, he conveyed the Duke of Orléans' proposal to the recently appointed Executive Council president, Georgios Koundouriotis. The latter's entourage, particularly his brother Lazaros, was vehemently opposed to the notion of a descendant of the "Regicides" ascending the Greek throne.

Notwithstanding this, discussions between the Duke of Orléans' representatives and Greece continued. In 1825, the Viscount de Rumigny, aide-de-camp to the prince, reached out to Minister Ioannis Kolettis to garner his support for establishing a constitutional monarchy (Note: The Duke of Orléans postulated the establishment of a Greek kingdom with a bicameral parliament, comprising an elected Chamber of Deputies and a Chamber of Peers, where the leaders of the insurrection would be seated. This configuration would result in the leaders being "burdened with honors, dignities, and wealth" (Driault & Lhéritier 1926a, p. 253).) in Greece and recommended General Henry Roche. Roche, representing the Paris Philhellenic Committee, arrived in the Greek capital, Nauplion, in late April. He was officially acting on behalf of the Duke of Orléans, though he was secretly serving the Duke of Nemours and promoting the latter's candidacy to the insurgents. However, Roche's lack of diplomatic tact led to his discrediting, and the secret was soon revealed. Meanwhile, several members of the Greek government (Kolettis, Anagnostis Spiliotakis, and Konstantinos Mavromichalis) sent an emissary to French Prime Minister Joseph de Villèle to ascertain the French government's stance.

France was concerned that the actions of the Duke of Orléans and his representatives in Greece might provoke a reaction from the other major powers. (Note: His assertion was indeed accurate. On August 21, 1825, Commodore Gawen William Hamilton explicitly conveyed to the Greek provisional government that the British government would vehemently oppose any endeavor to facilitate the landing of a French prince. Furthermore, he made it clear that they would not hesitate to take decisive action against the Greek fleet should it attempt to assist (Driault & Lhéritier 1926a, p. 294).) Through Baron de Damas, the French government disavowed General Roche and made it clear that it did not support the election of a Capetian prince. Consequently, the address of a few Greek deputies to the Duke of Orléans in early 1826 had no tangible result.

==== Embassy of Nikolas Kefalas to the Catholic Powers ====
Since the inception of the Greek War of Independence, a Greek captain, who identified himself as Nikolas Kefalas and asserted that he was acting on behalf of the provisional government, had been traversing Europe intending to locate a monarch who would assume the role of sovereign for Greece. On 16 April 1822, he was granted an audience by King John VI of Portugal, during which he proffered the Greek crown to his eldest son. At the time, Prince Pedro was in Rio de Janeiro, where he was pursuing policies that the Portuguese Cortes deemed overly favorable to Brazilian interests. The Portuguese political class hoped to use Kefalas' proposal to persuade the heir to return to Europe and thus restore Lisbon's control over its colony. A message was sent to Prince Peter informing him of the Greek offer, but he preferred to stay in Brazil, where he was soon proclaimed emperor.

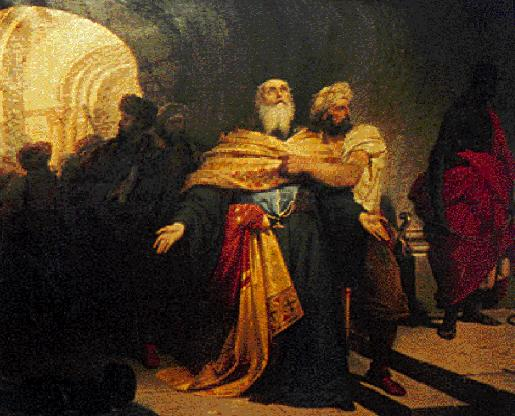
The execution of Patriarch Gregory V by the Turks, painting by Nikiforos Lytras

Notwithstanding this setback, Kefalas persisted in his circuit of European courts. In 1825, he reached out to Pope Leo XII with a request to reunite the Catholic and Orthodox churches under his leadership, by the conditions set forth by the Council of Florence in 1439. According to Kefalas, the execution of Patriarch Gregory V of Constantinople and numerous other members of the Holy Synod by Sultan Mahmud II in 1821 had resulted in a lack of guidance for Orthodox Christians, thereby necessitating the involvement of the Pope in Greece. To this end, Kefalas posited that the Pope's role would be limited to appointing a Catholic monarch from a dynastic line such as the Bourbons, Habsburgs, Wittelsbachs, or Wettins to the throne of Greece. He argued that such a monarch would inevitably lead to the expulsion of Muslims from Europe.

In addition to his audience with the Pope, Kefalas corresponded with Chancellor Metternich and the Baron de Damas, the French Minister of Foreign Affairs. Both men were suspicious of Kefalas, and Damas eventually discovered that he was acting on his behalf and was in no way an emissary of the Greek provisional government, which had even disavowed his endeavor. The Greeks were unequivocally opposed to the submission of their Church to the papacy and had no intention of converting to Catholicism, even in order to expel the Ottomans.

==== Greece Requests the Protection of the King of England ====
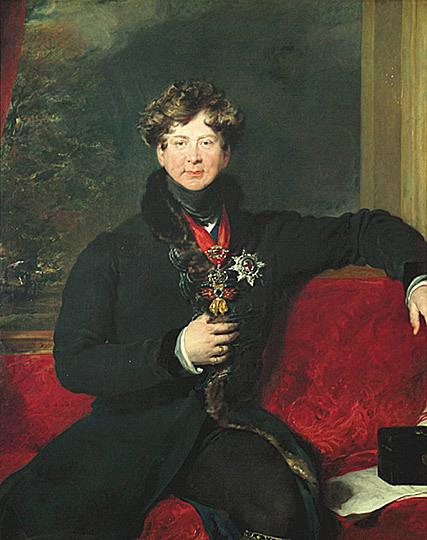
King George IV of the United Kingdom by Thomas Lawrence (circa 1822)

As European chancelleries began to express concern about Greece's future, Ibrahim Pasha of Egypt persisted in his campaign of reconquest on behalf of the Ottoman government. This resulted in thousands of inhabitants being killed or enslaved, deported to Egypt, and subjected to other forms of exploitation. Facing mounting challenges and the impact of external interference, particularly from France, the Greek provisional government sought assistance from the United Kingdom. On 26 July 1825, an assembly of deputies and members of the Orthodox clergy convened in Nauplion to formally petition King George IV for protection. In recognition of his role in safeguarding their interests, the Greek representatives proposed bestowing upon the British monarch the titles "Avenger of the Faith" and "Regenerator of the Abandoned People of Greece."

The appeal for assistance made by the Greek deputies to the British government provoked a profound sense of unease among both Philhellenic circles and the diplomatic corps. In Vienna, Metternich was convinced that if the United Kingdom extended the protection it already had over the Ionian Islands to all of Greece, Russia would hasten to invade Moldavia. The protest published by General Roche, already discredited but associated for the occasion with an American adventurer posing as the representative of the Philhellenic Committee of the United States, was nonetheless an unmitigated failure.

On September 2, 1825, British Foreign Secretary Lord Canning received a Greek delegation in London, which had come to request that the king and his government establish a protectorate. Canning was unequivocal in his refusal, citing the significant interests his country held in the Ottoman Empire and the potential risks of losing them by supporting the Greek insurgents. He therefore advised the envoys to accept a compromise with the Sublime Porte, which they were unable to accept. Despite disappointing the Greeks by maintaining the United Kingdom's neutrality in the conflict with the Turks, Lord Canning gained the goodwill of all of Europe; had he acted otherwise, he would have inevitably antagonized them.

=== Autonomous province, republic, or monarchy? ===
==== The Greeks ready to acknowledge Ottoman suzerainty ====
In the wake of this latest setback, and for a period exceeding a year, the question of monarchy receded from the Greek political agenda. Furthermore, the majority of Greek deputies came to accept the concept of limited autonomy within the Ottoman Empire. This is what Mavrokordatos and Konstantinos Zografos conveyed to British representatives by the end of 1825. Additionally, the Third National Assembly at Epidaurus issued a declaration on April 16, 1826, stating its willingness to acknowledge the Sultan's suzerainty and pay an annual tribute. However, it formally declined to permit the Sultan to intervene in the country's internal affairs.

Conversely, the Ottoman authorities were reluctant to engage in negotiations with the insurgents. In the Peloponnese, Ibrahim Pasha persisted in his campaign of reconquest and destruction of Greek forces. There were even reports that he sought to depopulate the region by replacing its inhabitants with Muslim colonists, a development that caused concern among the foreign ministries of the powers, who were opposed to the creation of a new Barbary State in the Mediterranean. (Note: The notion of a "barbarization" project has persisted as a persistent rumor, primarily disseminated by Dorothea von Benckendorff, the wife of the Prince of Lieven, the Russian ambassador in London. This rumor is believed to be a diplomatic-political maneuver designed to increase support for the Greek cause in Europe. Ibrahim Pasha is accused of intending to enslave the Greek population of the Peloponnese and deport them to his Egyptian lands, replacing them with North African Muslims. Despite Ibrahim Pasha's insistence that this rumor is false, it persists to this day (Woodhouse 1965, pp. 35–36).)

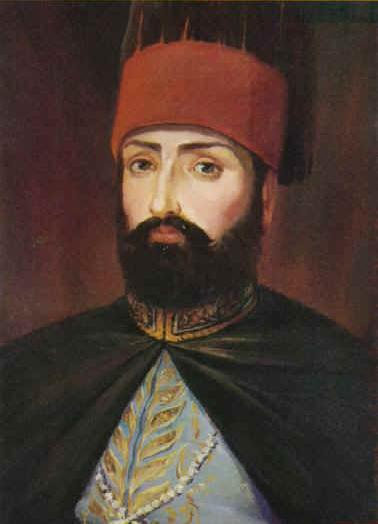
Ottoman Sultan Mahmoud II.

As a result, the Greeks requested the mediation of the United Kingdom. In response, London endeavored to intervene with the Sublime Porte to obtain autonomy for the Greek-held territory. However, the Ottoman government, which was wary of British involvement in its internal affairs, was unresponsive. Subsequently, Britain sought the assistance of Russia in compelling the Turks to consider the Greek proposal. It was at this juncture that Tsar Nicholas I, who had recently ascended to the Russian throne, issued an ultimatum to Constantinople, demanding the restoration of autonomy to the Danubian Principalities and Serbia (March 17). Seeking to appease its formidable neighbor and avert a potential conflict, the Sublime Porte initiated negotiations with him and signed the Convention of Akkerman on October 6, 1826. This agreement granted the Romanian and Serbian principalities a considerable degree of autonomy. In the meantime, London and Saint Petersburg reached an accord on a unified stance concerning the dispute between the Greeks and Ottomans. The protocol of April 4 proposed that Greece be designated a "dependency" of the Porte, with the Greeks paying an annual tribute to the Sultan. The amount of this tribute would be fixed permanently by mutual agreement. The Greeks would be exclusively governed by authorities chosen and appointed by themselves, but in whose appointment the Sultan would have some influence. In this state, the Greeks would enjoy complete public freedom of conscience and commerce and direct their internal government.

However, following the fall of Missolonghi to the combined forces of the Ottoman Empire and Egypt on April 23, the British government's diplomatic stance became increasingly skeptical of the Greek forces' ability to impose their demands on the Ottoman government. The United Kingdom counseled the insurgents to adopt a more conciliatory stance in their pursuit of autonomy. This entailed, among other things, acquiescing to the Sultan's involvement in the appointment of the country's magistrates. Russia, for its part, counseled the United Kingdom to adopt a more resolute posture to forestall any potential renegotiation of the concessions made at Akkerman by the Ottoman Empire. Even Charles X's France underwent a shift in its stance towards the Porte, aligning itself with the positions espoused by London and Saint Petersburg. In this way, the foundations of the Treaty of London of 6 July 1827, were gradually established, which resulted in the Battle of Navarino, in which the three allied powers destroyed the Turkish-Egyptian fleet, the Russo-Turkish War, during which Russia advanced into the Balkans and the Caucasus, and the Morea expedition, with which the French army expelled Egyptian forces from the Peloponnese.

==== Election of Count Kapodistrias as governor of Greece ====
While the major powers were still attempting to negotiate a resolution to the situation in Greece through diplomatic means, the Greek insurgents persisted in their efforts to expel the Ottomans from their homeland. As the military situation deteriorated, a new assembly was convened in Troezen in April 1827 to determine the appropriate course of action. Because Greek disunity was the primary cause of their misfortune, the deputies resolved to concentrate executive power in the hands of a single individual and appointed Count Ioannis Kapodistrias as governor (κυβερνήτης) of Greece for seven years.

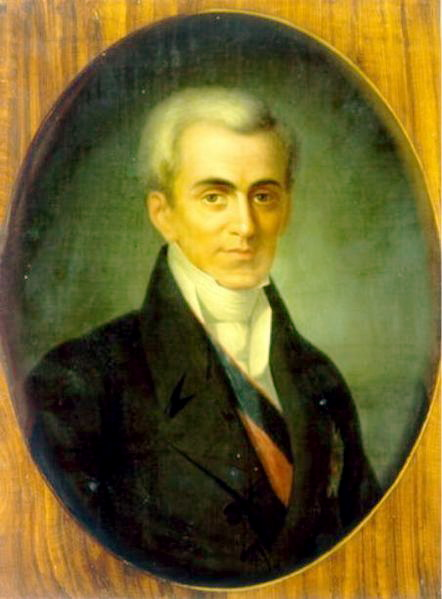
Count Ioannis Kapodistrias, by Dionysios Tsokos

Kapodistrias, a member of the Corfiot nobility (Note: The Kapodistrias family, whose origins can be traced to Capodistria (present-day Koper) in Slovenia, was ennobled by Duke Charles Emmanuel II of Savoy before being included in the Libro d'Oro (a comprehensive register of noble families) of the Ionian Islands in 1679.) and aged 50, had previously served in the government of the Septinsular Republic between 1802 and 1807. Subsequently, he joined the Russian diplomatic service and was appointed Minister of Foreign Affairs by Tsar Alexander I. For the Greeks, he possessed three significant advantages: he was not affiliated with any faction, he had extensive political experience, and most crucially, he was intimately acquainted with the intricacies of European diplomatic circles.

Kapodistrias arrived in Nauplio on 18 January 1828, aboard a British ship that was accompanied by French and Russian vessels. He promptly convened the various Greek warlords and attempted to resolve their internal divisions. Nevertheless, he did not endeavor to establish parliamentary institutions within the country. Conversely, he established a consultative council, the Panellinion, comprising twenty-seven members whom he appointed at his discretion. Furthermore, Kapodistrias was not in favor of the proposals put forth previously, which sought to transform Greece into a mere autonomous province of the Ottoman Empire. Since his ascension to the role of insurgent leader, the military landscape of the Peloponnese had undergone a notable transformation, largely due to the involvement of the coalition powers in the conflict against the Turco-Egyptian forces at Navarino.

Aware of the shift in circumstances, Sultan Mahmud II demonstrated a more conciliatory approach. He requested the intervention of the recently appointed Patriarch Agathangelos I of Constantinople and authorized the dispatch of a delegation of clergy to Greece, comprising the archbishops of Nicaea, Chalcedon, Larissa, and Ioannina. In late 1828, envoys from the Ottoman government met with Governor Kapodistrias in Poros. They delivered a letter from the Patriarch promising amnesty to insurgents in exchange for their submission. However, Kapodistrias declined to engage in further negotiations on this basis and informed the envoys that henceforth the Greeks were only willing to negotiate based on the terms outlined in the 1827 Treaty of London. Consequently, the meeting proved inconclusive, and the clergy returned to Constantinople.

==== Protocols of Poros and London ====
In the period between September and December 1828, diplomatic representatives from France, the United Kingdom, and Russia journeyed to Poros to engage in discussions with their counterparts from the Ottoman Empire and Greece. The Porte declined to participate in the negotiations, which greatly benefited Kapodistrias, who did not avoid the conference. On September 23, the Governor of Greece submitted a memorandum to the representatives of the powers, wherein he articulated substantial reservations regarding the proposal of Greek autonomy under the suzerainty of the Sultan. Nevertheless, the powers were not yet prepared to fully acknowledge the country's independence. Upon the conclusion of the conference, the assembled representatives signed a memorandum on 12 December 1828. This document asserted the necessity of establishing Greece as an autonomous province, to be governed by an appointed leader who could also be succeeded hereditarily. This leader would remain under the suzerainty of the Sultan, and Greece would pay an annual tribute of 1,500,000 Turkish piastres.

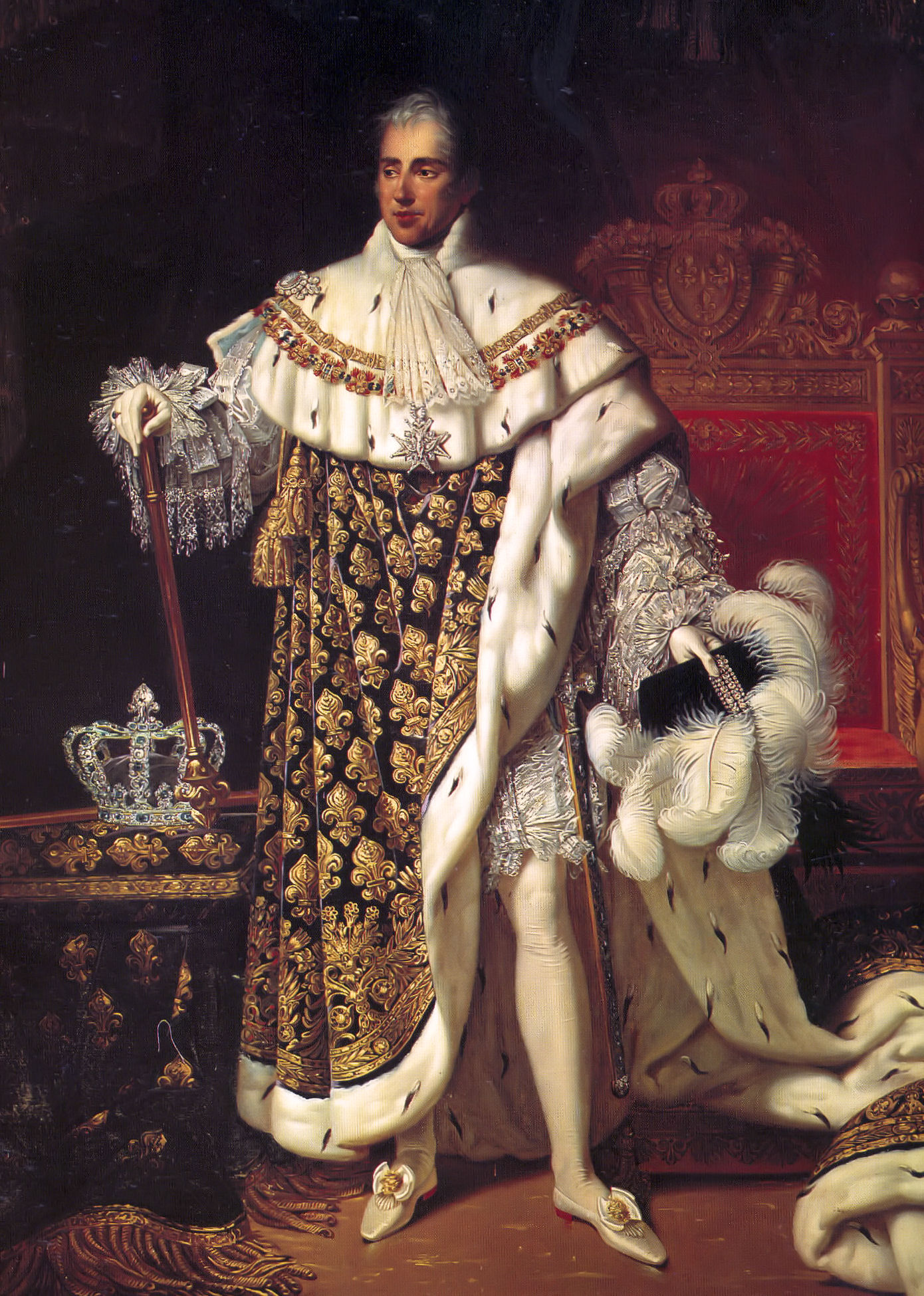
King Charles X of France in coronation costume.

As the war between Russia and the Ottoman Empire continued, the Sublime Porte eventually consented to enter into discussions with France and the United Kingdom regarding the future of Greece. On 22 March 1829, the governments of the powers signed a protocol in London based on the 12 December memorandum, which was to serve as a basis for negotiations. This document was more detailed than the previous one and set forth the following stipulations:

Greece shall enjoy, under the suzerainty of the Porte, an internal administration best suited to guarantee it religious and commercial freedom as well as the prosperity and peace it is meant to ensure. To this end, this administration shall be as close as possible to monarchical forms and shall be entrusted to a Christian chief or prince whose authority shall be hereditary by order of primogeniture. In no case shall this chief be chosen from among the princes of the families reigning in the three states signatories of the Treaty of July 6, 1827, and the first choice shall be made in concert between the three courts and the Ottoman Porte. To mark the vassalage relations of Greece towards the Ottoman Empire, the hereditary chief shall receive investiture from the Porte and shall pay it an additional year of tribute upon his accession. In the event of the extinction of the reigning branch, the Porte shall participate in the selection of a new chief as it had participated in the selection of the first one.

Notwithstanding the substantial gains it signified for the Greek cause, this protocol proved unsatisfactory to Count Kapodistrias and his administration. As early as May 20, the governor expressed discontent, noting that the Greeks were not consulted in the selection of the prince who was to govern them. Furthermore, he demanded that the sovereign chosen by the powers convert to the Orthodox religion and accept a constitution. Ultimately, he requested that, in the event of the extinction of the chosen dynasty, the new one be directly elected by the Greek nation.

The Ottoman government was officially informed of the protocol's content in June, and subsequently declined to grant Greece a status that recalled that of Serbia. Consequently, the Sultan merely issued a new firman on July 30, promising a broad amnesty to repentant insurgents, the appointment of a governor favorable to the Greeks, the punishment of abuses, and a reform of taxation and local administration.

== Recognition of Greek independence ==
=== From autonomy to independence ===
==== The Porte's hesitations ====
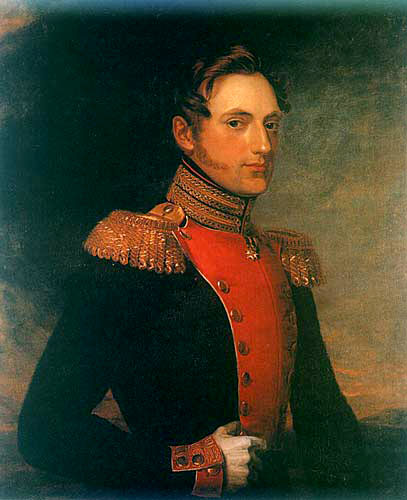
Tsar Nicholas I of Russia by George Dawe (1823)

As the Russian army continued its advance towards Constantinople and Mahmud II's concerns about a revolution grew, the Porte was compelled to resume negotiations. On August 5, 1829, the Reis Effendi (the Sultan's Foreign Minister) put forth a new plan for autonomy to the ambassadors of France and the United Kingdom. This plan, which was aimed at the Peloponnese alone, proposed the establishment of institutions similar to those of the Danubian Principalities. The ambassadors were dissatisfied with the proposals and deemed them inadequate.

In the following days, the Ottoman government consented to the appointment of a hereditary Christian prince in the Peloponnese, to be subject to the Sultan's suzerainty. However, this decision was swiftly rescinded, and the Porte reverted to the proposal of a semi-autonomous Peloponnese, to be governed by a voivode elected by the Greek population but approved by the Sultan. In this revised text, the imperial government even specified that the future leader of the Greeks would be allowed to have served a foreign power, a clear allusion to Count Kapodistrias, the former foreign minister of the Tsar.

Once again, the French and British ambassadors were disconcerted. Nevertheless, following the Russians' capture of Adrianople, the Porte ultimately consented on August 11 to acknowledge the Treaty of London of 1827.

==== Prince Polignac's project ====
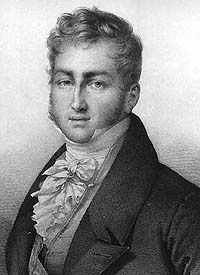
Prince Jules de Polignac, Prime Minister of France

With the surrender of Adrianople, the Tsar's army advanced on Constantinople. In light of the Ottoman Empire's declining prospects and the imminent establishment of a new order in Europe, the French government submitted a proposal for reshaping the continent to Saint Petersburg. In this confidential document, Prince Jules de Polignac put forth the proposal of ceding the principalities of Moldavia and Wallachia, along with a significant portion of Asia Minor, to Russia. In return, Austria would gain Serbia and Bosnia, Prussia would annex Saxony and the Netherlands, the United Kingdom would assume control of the Dutch colonies, and France would regain a foothold in Belgium. In the event of the loss of their respective states, King Anton I of Saxony and King William I of the Netherlands would be established in the Rhineland and Greece, respectively. Subsequently, the Greek kingdom would encompass mainland Greece, Crete, Cyprus, the Aegean Islands, and the majority of the coastline of present-day Turkey. The Turkish Straits would be rendered neutral. Ultimately, in the East, Egypt's ruler, Mehmet Ali, would have the opportunity to rebuild a vast Arab empire for his benefit.

In view of the evident difficulties that the dissolution of the Ottoman Empire would entail, the Russian government declined to assume control of Constantinople and instead initiated discussions with the Sultan on August 23. In the following weeks, on September 14, a peace treaty was signed in Adrianople, allowing Saint Petersburg to enter Armenia but also requiring the Porte to accept the Treaty of London of 1827 and the Protocol of March 22, 1829. From that point forward, the Sultan's government was amenable to negotiation, and a new international conference could be convened in London to settle the fate of Greece.

==== London Protocol of 3 February 1830 ====
During their time in Greece, the insurgents were able to achieve new military successes and liberate additional regions that were still occupied by the Ottomans. In response, the Porte requested that the powers reconsider the treaties that had been agreed upon through the signing of the Adrianople Peace on September 25.

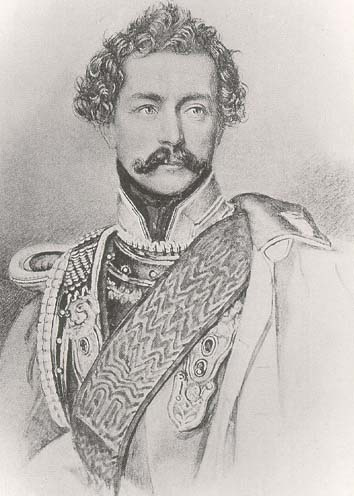
Charles of Bavaria

As a result, the Sultan's government incurred the displeasure of France, which subsequently proposed to the other powers the complete and total independence of Greece. The United Kingdom, increasingly concerned about Russia's growing influence over the Ottoman Empire, and recognizing that a free Greece would be more readily accessible to Saint Petersburg than an autonomous Greece, promptly endorsed the French proposal. Concerning Russia, its principal objective was to demonstrate its amicability towards its allies, and it did not oppose the prospect of Greek independence.

On November 30, the London Conference acknowledged Greece's independence, albeit with a diminished scope compared to the autonomy initially envisioned. France then proposed making the country a grand duchy, to be entrusted to Prince Charles of Bavaria, the younger brother of King Louis I, who had been a generous supporter of the Greek insurgents. However, the British government was firmly opposed to the Bavarian candidacy. As a result, the diplomats agreed to offer the Greek crown either to Prince John of Saxony (who was supported by France), to Prince Frederick of the Netherlands (who was supported by the United Kingdom), or to another candidate if these two refused.

Following the conclusion of the London Conference, a new protocol was signed on February 3, 1830. This resulted in Greece becoming a fully independent state, yet the monarchical institutions were established without consulting its representatives, who had not been invited to the negotiations. The powers decided that the country's government should be entrusted to a hereditary monarch bearing the title of "Sovereign Prince of Greece." They also reiterated that the future sovereign could not be chosen from the families reigning in Paris, London, and Saint Petersburg.

=== The choice of Leopold of Saxe-Coburg ===
==== Prince Leopold of Saxe-Coburg receives the crown ====
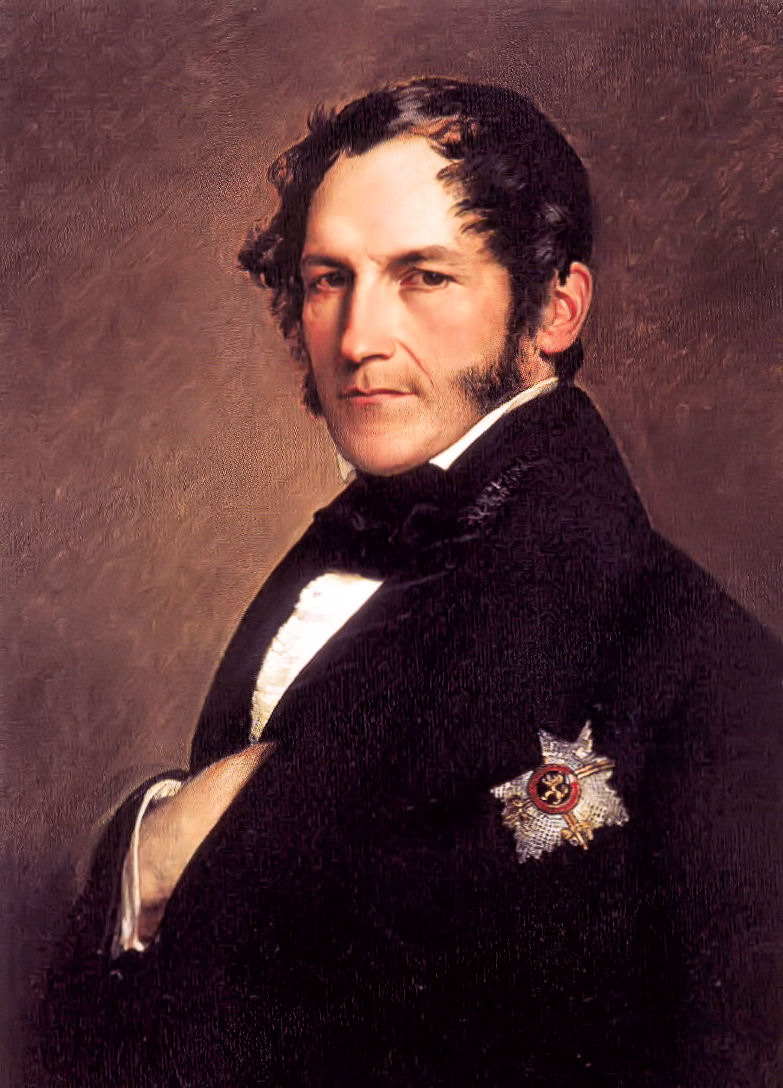
Portrait of Prince Leopold of Saxe-Coburg by Franz Xaver Winterhalter.

Leopold, the widower of Princess Charlotte Augusta of the United Kingdom, the only daughter of King George IV, is not considered a full member of the House of Hanover and does not hold any official position in his adopted country. Consequently, he is not subject to the exclusion measures that pertain to other British, French, and Russian princes. Prince Leopold is held in high esteem, particularly given his previous role as a general in the Russian army and his extensive connections with European royal families. In Greece, Prince Leopold is not unknown, frequently mentioned in Anglophile circles. However, he has long been estranged from his father-in-law, who has not forgiven him for siding with his ex-wife, Princess Caroline of Brunswick, in their dispute. As a result, the prince encountered difficulties in securing support from the British government, which accepted his candidacy only reluctantly and requested that he relinquish all his English possessions in return.

Following the approval of the Duke of Wellington and his cabinet, Prince Leopold formally accepted the proposal extended to him on February 11, 1830. To secure the most advantageous position for himself in Greece, he adds a series of conditions to his acceptance of the royal charge. He requested that the powers protect the Hellenic country against external aggression and that this measure be extended to Samos and Crete, whose populations have largely participated in the war of independence. Furthermore, the prince requests that the Greek-Ottoman border be slightly modified in favor of Greece in the Aspropotamo Valley and that the powers provide his country with significant financial and military aid until the state is fully reorganized.

Subsequently, correspondence ensues, and the representatives of the powers accept the majority of the requested guarantees. The representatives of the powers assure the prince of their governments' desire to protect the Christians of the islands, as well as those of Greece. They also promise Leopold a sufficient loan to allow him to reorganize the Hellenic army. Furthermore, they propose that the French troops of the Morea army remain in Greece for as long as the prince deems necessary. However, they insist on the impossibility of changing the course of the border between Greece and the Porte.

Once these explanations were provided, the powers were convinced that they had overcome Leopold's reluctance. On February 20, 1830, they signed a new international protocol that granted George IV's son-in-law the title of "sovereign prince of Greece." A few days later, on February 28, Leopold officially accepted the crown.

==== Greece's demands and Prince Leopold's abdication ====
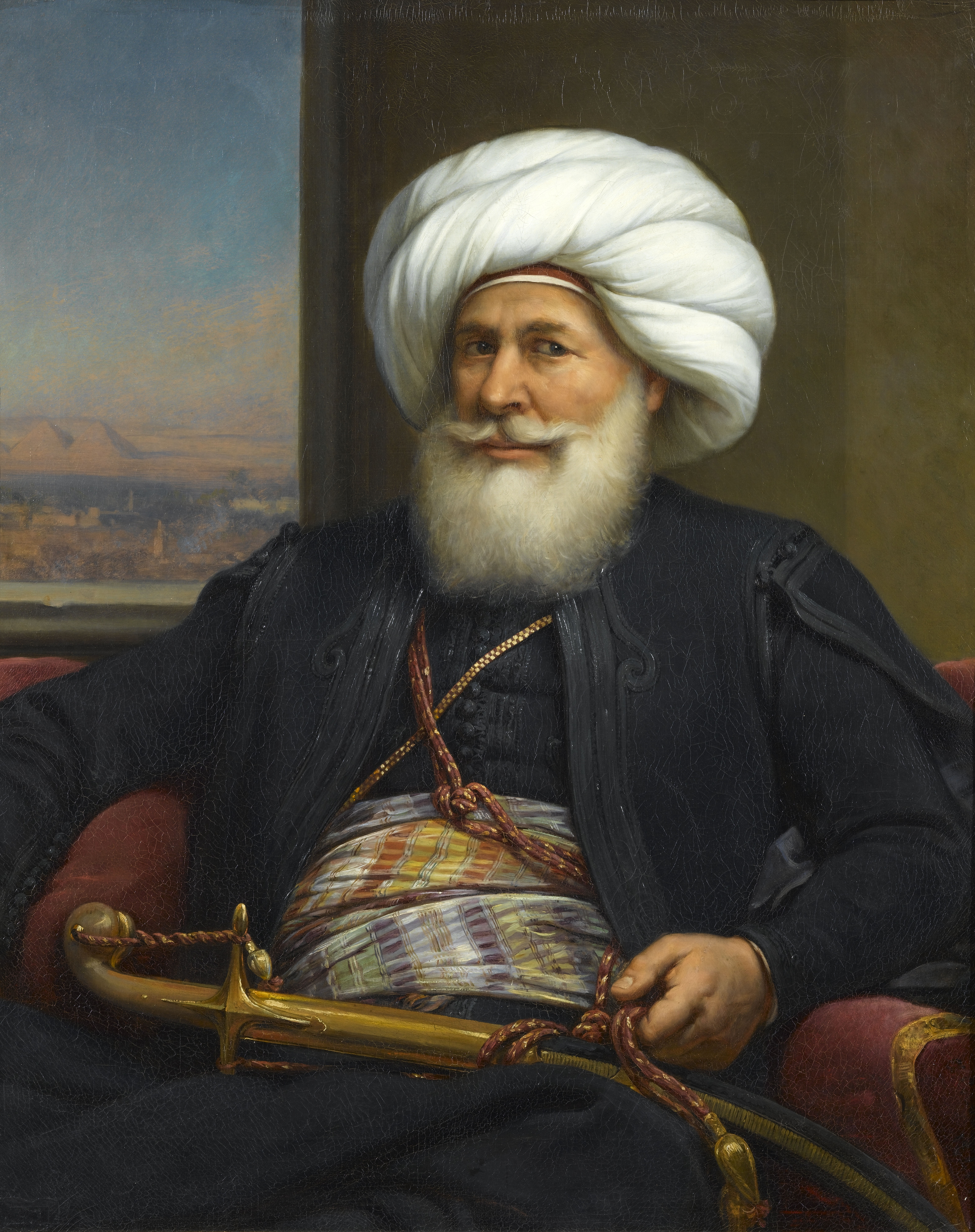
Hard hit by the War of Independence, Crete was entrusted to Mehemet Ali, Viceroy of Egypt, by the London Protocol of February 3, 1830.

Having accepted the position of King of Greece, Leopold promptly notified Count Kapodistrias, with whom he had been acquainted since the Napoleonic Wars and with whom he reestablished contact in 1825 to secure his assistance. In his missive, the prince requests the governor's assistance and counsel, yet the response he receives (dated April 6) fails to provide the reassurance he seeks. It seems that Kapodistrias' intention may have been to intimidate and dissuade Leopold from pursuing the throne. (Note: This is the opinion of Olivier Defrance (Defrance 2004, p. 101), though it differs from that of Édouard Driault and Michel Lhéritier (Driault & Lhéritier 1926b, pp. 18 & 26).) He emphasizes the discontent in Greece caused by the border delimitation with the Ottoman Empire and suggests to the prince that the new demarcation must be ratified by the National Assembly. Furthermore, the politician underscores the Greeks' aspiration for their new sovereign to espouse the Orthodox faith, a prospect that does not meet with Leopold's approval. (Note: Upon ascending to the Belgian throne in 1831, Leopold II declined to convert to Catholicism, maintaining his affiliation with the Lutheran faith throughout his lifetime.)

In the following days, on April 22, 1830, the Greek Senate drafted a memorandum addressed to Leopold. In this document, the Senate expressed its support for the prince's election but also presented the demands of the Hellenic people. In this document, the Assembly also strongly asserts the injustice of the border drawn by the great powers, the rightful belonging of Samos, Crete, and Psara to the Greek nation, the country's financial situation, and the matter of the royal religion.

In London, Prince Leopold endeavors to provide substantial assistance to the Greek delegation in their pursuit of their demands. He successed in negotiating an increase in the loan granted by the powers to the Hellenic nation from twelve to sixty million francs. However, he cannot effect a change in the border alignment with the Ottoman Empire or to incorporate Crete into the kingdom. In light of these circumstances and the tenuous nature of his position vis-à-vis the Greek populace, Leopold discloses to the representatives of the powers on May 21 that he elects to relinquish the responsibilities entrusted to him and renounce the Hellenic crown.

In light of Prince Leopold's abdication, the powers resolved to identify an alternative candidate for the Greek throne. The representatives of France and Russia then requested the Hellenic Senate to provide its opinion regarding a potential candidate. However, the Senate merely expressed its "full confidence in the fairness and wisdom of the Allies, awaiting their final decision as a decree of Providence." Nevertheless, the outbreak of the July 1830 revolution in France soon diminished the great powers' interest in the fate of the Hellenic nation.

== A period of uncertainty ==
=== The impact of the Revolutions of 1830 ===
==== The end of the "Vienna Order" and the neglect of the Greek question ====
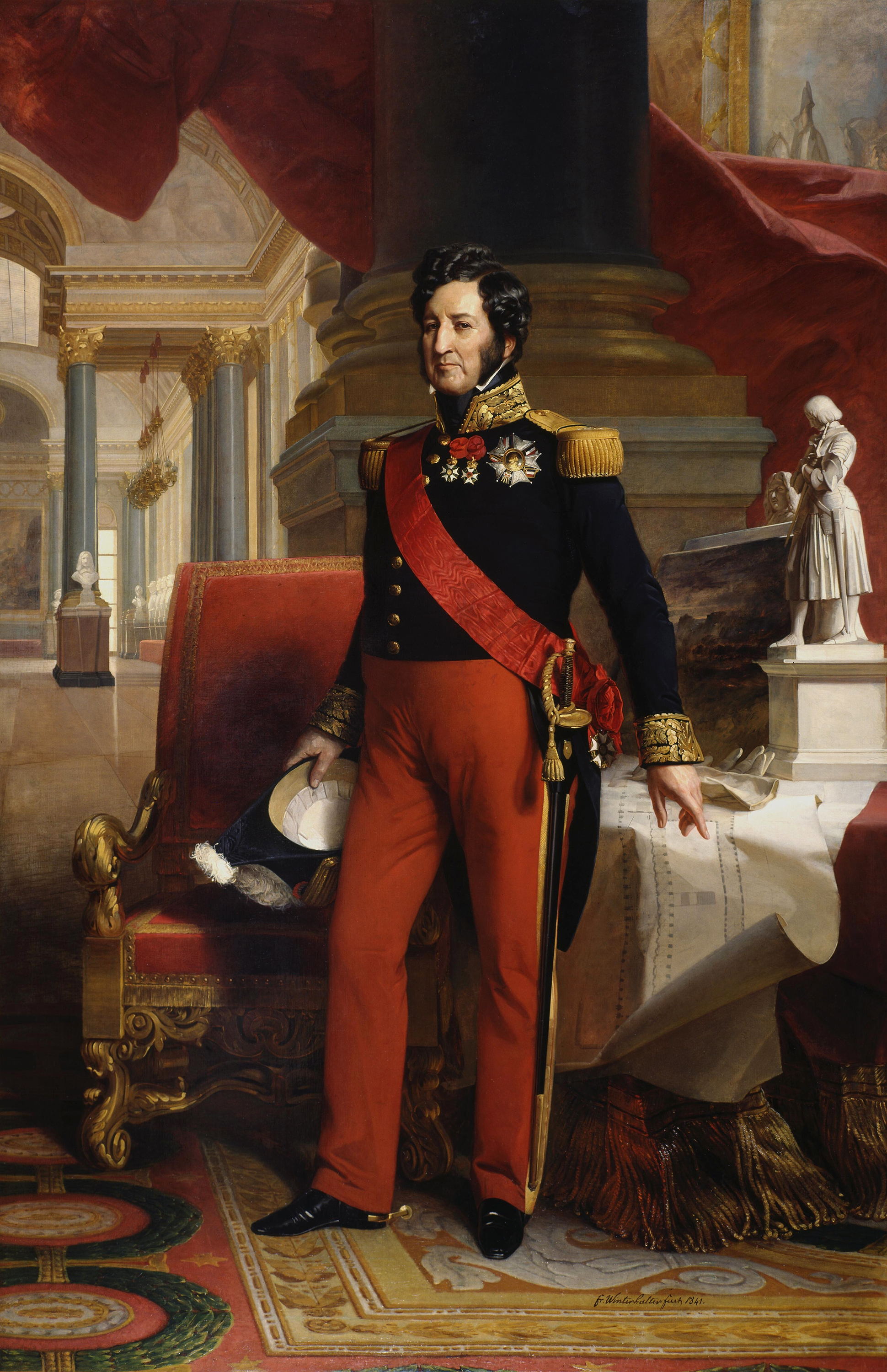
Thanks to the Revolution of 1830, the Duc d'Orléans became King of France under the name of Louis-Philippe I.

The French Revolution of July 1830 and the uprisings in Belgium (in August), Italy, Germany, and Poland (in November) had a profound impact on the "Vienna Order", leading to a temporary reorganization of international relations. These developments have the effect of undermining the positive relations that exist between the powers that guarantee Greek independence. A rift is becoming increasingly evident between France, now under the governance of the July Monarchy of Louis-Philippe I, and the Russian Empire of Nicholas I.

For a period exceeding one year, the attention of the great powers has also been directed towards the fate of Belgium. No new international conference addresses the Greek question before September 26, 1831. Furthermore, while the royal election in Greece appears to be at an impasse, with no new candidacy genuinely put forth by the powers, Prince Leopold of Saxe-Coburg is elected King of the Belgians on June 4, 1831, under the name Leopold I. This development causes some unrest among the Greek population.

==== Kapodistrias's dictatorship and Greek instability ====
Upon his arrival in Greece in 1828, Count Kapodistrias then consolidated his power base by establishing a Council of State (the Panellinion) under his direct command and appointing prefects and extraordinary commissioners to oversee the country and its communities. The governor of Greece has been able to impose himself on the international stage due to his considerable prestige and diplomatic successes. Furthermore, the Assembly he initially worked with has been particularly compliant, given that its election was supervised by the new prefects.

However, following two years of stability, the refusal of the great powers to provide Greece with robust borders and full sovereignty, led to growing discontent among the Greek population towards Kapodistrias. He was accused by clan leaders of attempting to dissuade Prince Leopold of Saxe-Coburg from coming to Greece to assume the crown, which led to suspicions that he was seeking to retain power for himself.

In the summer of 1830, amidst a wave of revolutionary fervor across Europe, a new uprising shook Greece, particularly the Aegean Islands and Mani. The revolt, led by former independence war leaders (Mavrokordatos, Trikoupis, Miaoulis, Koundouriotis, and Tombazis), prompted Kapodistrias to establish a personal dictatorship, suppress public liberties, and set up special tribunals. In response, the insurgents portrayed Kapodistrias as a puppet of Russia and sought to exploit the existing power structures to gain power for themselves. It is at this time that the candidacy of the young Duke of Nemours was again discussed in Greece.

=== In search of a new candidate ===
==== Towards a Byzantine Restoration? ====
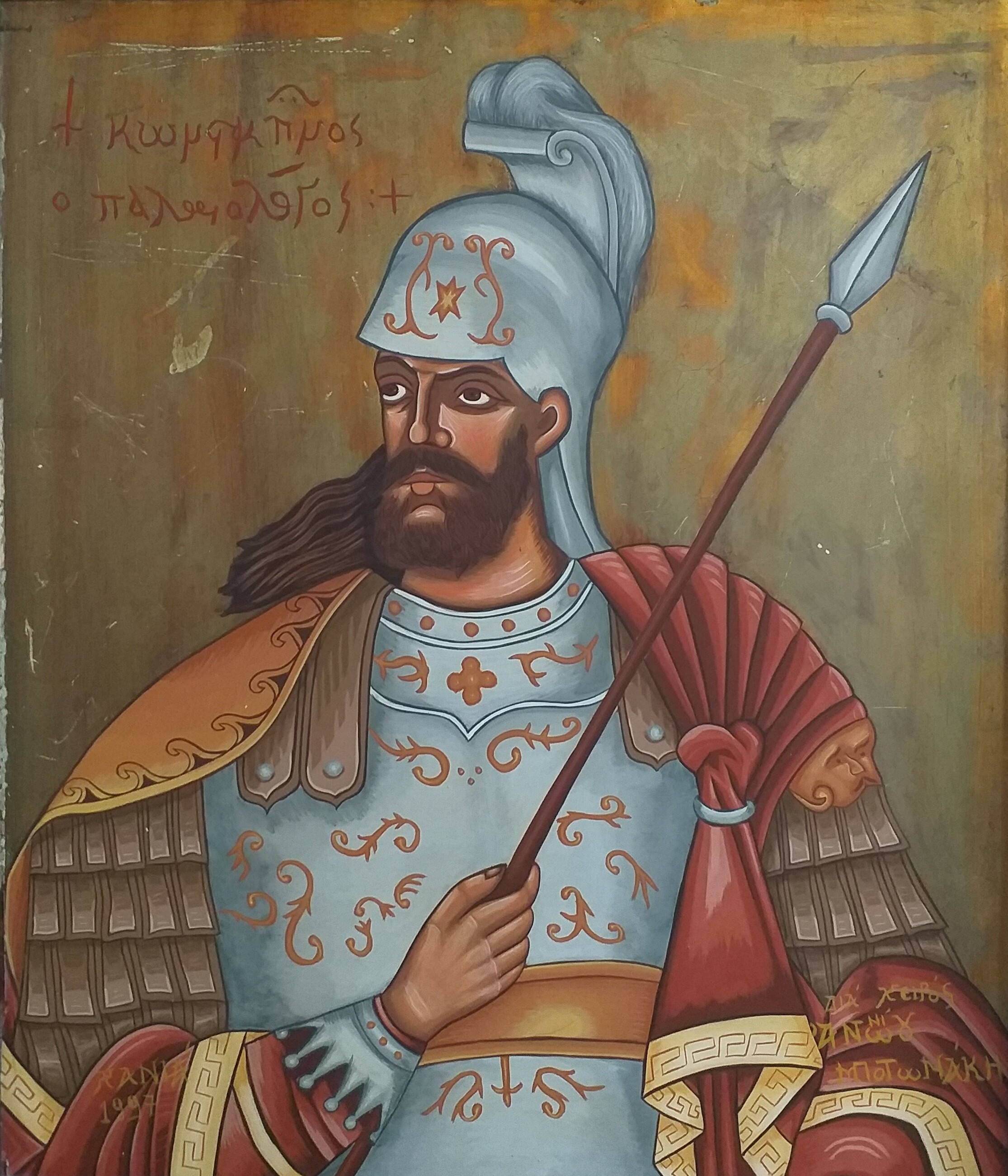
Constantine XI Palaeologus, last Byzantine emperor.

In the aftermath of the war of independence, the Greek government dispatched a delegation to Western Europe to ascertain whether the Paleologos lineage had survived the fall of Constantinople. However, this mission proved unsuccessful. Concurrently, many individuals purporting to be descendants of the Byzantine emperors made their claims to the Hellenic crown known to the European chancelleries.

In France, Georges Stephanopoli de Comnène, brother and heir of Demetrio Stefanopoli de Comneni, who obtained letters patent from King Louis XVI in 1782 recognizing him as the descendant and heir of the Comneni of Byzantium and Trebizond, (Note: The letter patent state that Demetrius is a direct descendant of Emperor David Comnenus, descending "in direct line, to the thirteenth degree" (Comnène 1831, p. 8).) asserts his claim to the imperial succession. He is a member of the Greek community of Cargèse and the uncle of the Duchess of Abrantès. He posits that the Hellenes would be best governed by a prince of the same origin. However, in light of the lack of interest demonstrated by the powers in his candidacy, "Prince Georges" ultimately restricts his claims to an apanage in Greece for his nephew and heir, Adolphe-Constant Geouffre de Comnène, and subsequently, to a mere financial compensation for him and his family.

Similarly, in the United Kingdom, an Irishman named Nicholas Macdonald Sarsfield Cod contacted Prime Ministers Lord Aberdeen and Lord Palmerston and King William IV in 1830 to present his claims. He claims to be "the heir and representative of his royal ancestor Constantine" and requests that the political class recognize him as the heir to the Greek throne. Additionally, he critiques the inconsistency of Prince Leopold, whose selection he deems incomprehensible.

==== Candidates far from unanimous support ====
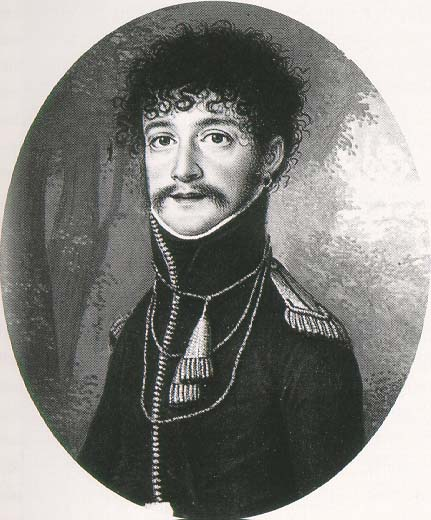
Prince Paul of Württemberg, circa 1800.

In the absence of a definitive resolution regarding the vacant Greek throne, the potential candidacy of the Duke of Nemours is once again a topic of discussion in France and Greece. Despite his election to the Belgian throne on February 3, 1831, the second son of King Louis-Philippe I remains without a crown, as his father declined the honor for him to appease England. Nevertheless, the prince's candidacy for the Greek crown would contravene the London Protocol of March 22, 1829, which prohibits members of the ruling dynasties of Greece's protector powers from ascending the Hellenic throne. The Orléans family thus definitively renounces the project delineated by their leader in 1824. (Note: The candidacy of another prince of Orléans, the Duke of Aumale, is nevertheless mentioned during the election to the throne of Greece in 1862-1863, albeit with little enthusiasm (Teyssier 2006, p. 227).)

Subsequently, alternative candidates emerged. First, Prince Paul of Württemberg, who had secured the endorsement of the former King Charles X of France in July 1830, ultimately failed to persuade his successor and rival to do the same. Subsequently, Prince Frederick of the Netherlands, who had been considered the previous year but was now strongly opposed by Paris, was also put forth as a candidate. Paris viewed the Orange-Nassau family as enemies of France since Belgian independence. Finally, Prince Otto of Bavaria was also considered, but Russia criticized him for belonging to a Catholic dynasty and thus being unlikely to embrace Orthodoxy.

The appointment of a European prince to head Greece has proven more challenging than anticipated. In response, the chancelleries have considered appointing Count Kapodistrias as regent to stabilize the country and facilitate a transition to a monarchical regime. However, this initiative has also encountered difficulties in securing unanimous support from the powers, ultimately leading to its non-implementation.

==== The king of Bavaria supports his son's candidacy ====
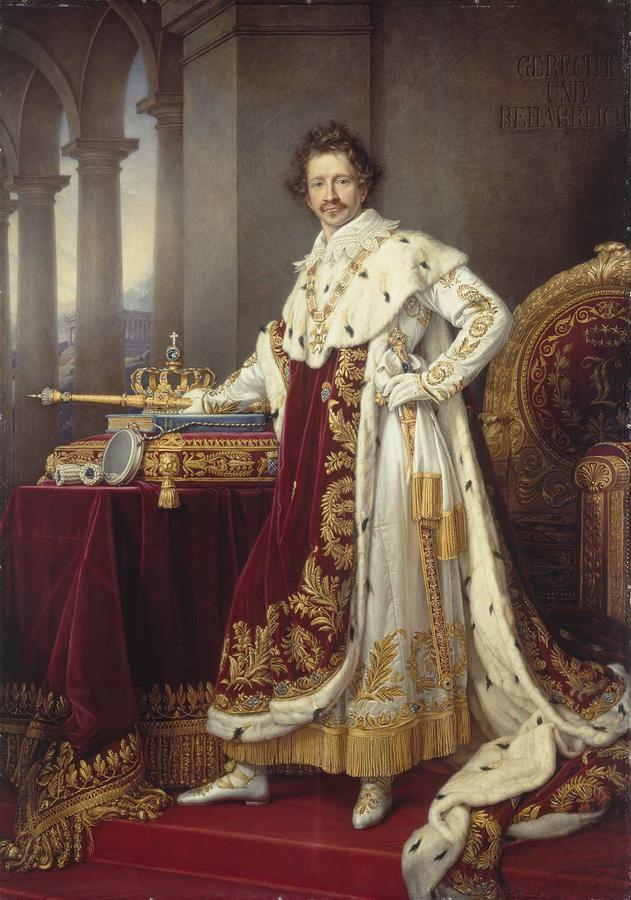
King Ludwig I of Bavaria in coronation dress.

Upon ascending the throne of Bavaria in 1825, King Ludwig I promptly demonstrated his staunch support for the Greek cause, which he referred to as his "philhellene" sentiments. The monarch was profoundly inspired by classical culture and provided substantial financial support for the Greek cause at a time when other European rulers perceived the War of Independence as a potential threat to the continent's stability. In 1829, the king, who had been advised by his son's tutor, Friedrich Thiersch, a Hellenist, proposed that Prince Otto be considered for the crown of Greece. Subsequently, he intends to dispatch the 14-year-old to his adoptive country to foster his Greek identity and vest the regency in Count Ioannis Kapodistrias.

Despite initial reluctance from Russia, King Ludwig gradually succeeded in persuading the other powers of the merits of his project. However, the resurgence of unrest in Greece once again complicated the question of the election to the throne and, in particular, that of a possible regency.

=== Instability in Greece ===
==== The assassination of Kapodistrias and the rise to power of his brother ====
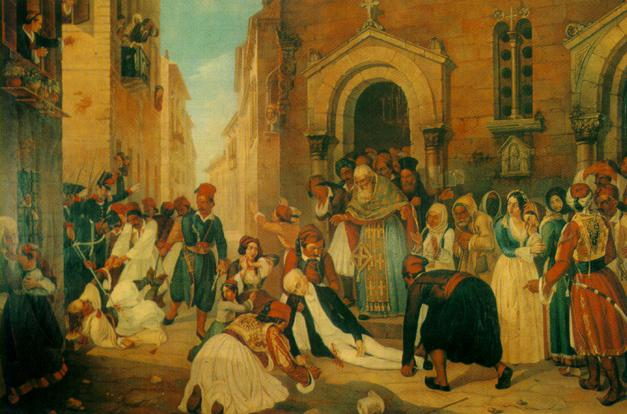
The assassination of Kapodistrias. Painting by Dionysios Tsokos.

As Greece teeters on the brink of civil war and the protective powers express mounting concern about the country's situation, an assassination disrupts the political life of Hellas. On September 27, 1831 (Julian calendar), Count Kapodistrias was assassinated while en route to church. The perpetrators of the assassination, Konstantinos and Georgios Mavromikhalis, were respectively the brother and son of the warlord Petros Mavromikhalis. The latter had been imprisoned by the Governor of Greece on March 8 in an attempt to pressure the Maniot insurgents. Immediately following the assassination, the first of the perpetrators is killed by a guard assigned to the head of state. However, the second perpetrator evades capture and flees to the French legation. Ultimately, he is handed over to the authorities and tried, resulting in his execution by firing squad on October 23. Notably, he issued a final call for his compatriots to unite.

Once again, the Greek government is lacking a leader, necessitating the appointment of a new executive. In the aftermath of the assassination, the Senate promptly convened to establish a provisional government. This government was composed of Count Augustinos Kapodistrias, the younger brother of the late Governor Theodoros Kolokotronis, and Ioannis Kolettis. However, the persistent unrest within the country enables Augustinos Kapodistrias to progressively gain the upper hand over his rivals. The elections for the National Assembly deputies, which commence in Argos, are marred by a multitude of irregularities, including the exclusion of deputies from regions that are opposed to the "Russian party." On December 19, an assembly of pro-Russian Moreote deputies elected Kapodistrias as governor of Greece. In response, a rival assembly of mainland Greek deputies, convening in the city, was dispersed by force three days later. Following this event, the schism among the Greeks intensified, with the opposition establishing a parallel government in Megara, primarily led by Kolettis. The powers eventually recognized the new sovereign of Greece, anticipating that the forthcoming appointment of Prince Otto would reinstate stability within the country.

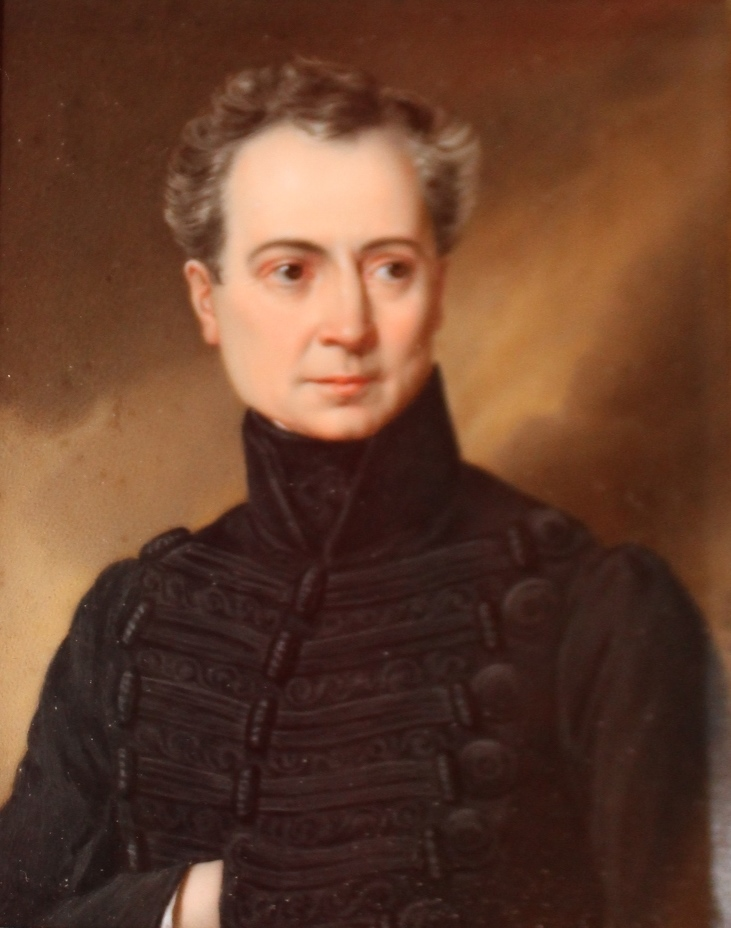
Count Augustinos Kapodistrias (1834).

==== The fifth National Assembly and the new monarchical regime ====
While the Greek opposition voices its discontent with the powers that be in the wake of the official recognition of Augustinos Kapodistrias' government, the fifth Greek National Assembly, convened in March 1832 in Nauplia, resolves to enact a constitution in anticipation of the arrival of their new sovereign.

Notwithstanding protests from representatives of the powers, who expressed concern that adopting a fundamental law would alarm the Bavarian court, the Greek deputies proceeded to establish the foundations for a new political regime. The text specifies that sovereignty will henceforth be hereditary, constitutional, and representative; that the heir to the throne must profess the Orthodox religion and be declared of age at 24; that a House of Deputies and a Senate will be established; and that provincial assemblies will be formed at the local level. Additionally, the Assembly confirmed the legitimacy of Count Augustinos Kapodistrias, who was to remain as the head of state until the arrival of the new king.

==== The resignation of Augustinos Kapodistrias and his replacement by Kolettis ====
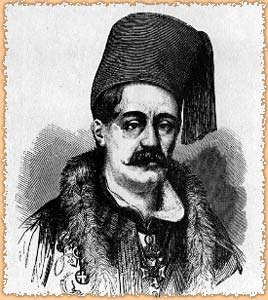
Portrait of Ioannis Kolettis.

The National Assembly's decisions have had the unintended consequence of exacerbating the schism between the disparate political factions in Greece. Those who oppose Augustinos Kapodistrias believe that by confirming his election as the leader of Greece, the Assembly has effectively granted him nearly absolute authority. Those in opposition allege that the head of state attempts to retain control over the future sovereign to maintain his authority. In light of these developments, the Maniots and islanders have called for the resignation of the governor and the establishment of a foreign regency, to be selected by the King of Bavaria.

The opposition forces, led by Ioannis Kolettis, resolved to take Argos and expel Count Kapodistrias. Following a successful initial engagement with the loyalist forces of Dimitrios Kallergis, the opposition forces captured the Greek capital on April 7, 1832. In light of the potential for a similar fate to befall him, the governor then resigns from his position and exiles himself to his family's lands in Corfu. With control now established, Kolettis formed a new government, initially comprising five members (Note: Kolokotronis, Zaïmis, Kolettis, Metaxas, and B. Boudouris, then Koundouriotis, Ypsilantis, Zaïmis, Kolettis, Metaxas, Plapoutas, and Trikoupis.) and subsequently seven, representing a diverse array of factions. This "mixed government" persists until Otto arrives in Greece but ultimately proves inadequate in restoring peace within the country.

== Effective independence ==
=== Diplomatic negotiations ===
==== From Munich negotiations to the Treaty of London ====
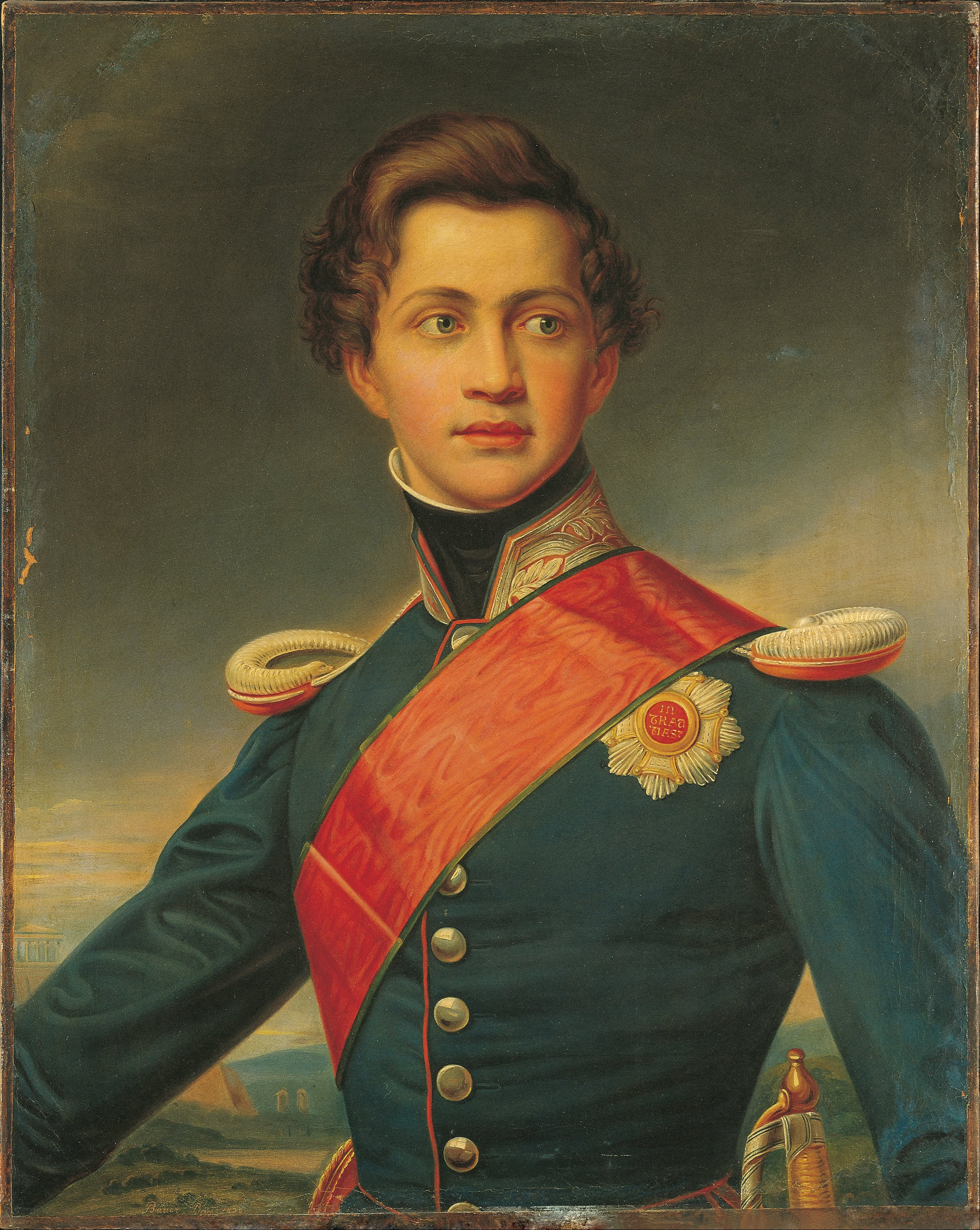
Portrait of Otto of Bavaria by Joseph Stieler (c. 1835).

Since January 1832, the representatives of the protective powers have consented to bestow the crown of Greece upon Prince Otto of Bavaria and have initiated negotiations with the court of Ludwig I to facilitate the election. The governments of Great Britain, France, and Russia have collectively demanded that the Kingdom of Bavaria establish an apanage for Prince Otto. This is intended to ensure that, once he ascends to the Greek throne, he will not impose a significant financial burden on his subjects. Furthermore, they requested that Ludwig I guarantee the establishment of a legal order in Greece and select Count von Montgelas, renowned for his liberal ideologies, as the regent. The Bavarian monarch guarantees to the powers' representatives that his country is prepared to make the requisite financial sacrifices to facilitate the election. However, he indicates that Count von Montgelas is too advanced in age to be reassigned from his current post in Bavaria. Instead, he proposes Count von Armansperg as a suitable replacement. Similarly to Leopold of Saxe-Coburg, the king demands that the powers provide Greece with a more secure border, extending from the Gulf of Arta to the Gulf of Volos and including the Aegean islands. Furthermore, he requested a loan of sixty million francs for Greece and ensured that the constitution voted by the National Assembly was not enforced.

In comparison to the stance taken in 1830, the governments in power demonstrated a greater degree of openness regarding the issue of Greek borders and expressed opposition to the recently proposed constitution, which they deemed invalid. However, they did acknowledge the moderation of the Bavarian demands. The Protocol of April 26, 1832, and the Treaty of London of May 7, 1832, formally proclaimed the elevation of Greece to a kingdom and the appointment of Prince Otto of Bavaria as its head of state. The crown is declared to be hereditary by primogeniture in the descendants of King Otto, or the event that there are no surviving descendants of King Otto, then in those of his brother Luitpold, or the event that there are no surviving descendants of King Otto or his brother Luitpold, then in those of his brother Adalbert. However, the treaty specifies that "in no case shall the crowns of Bavaria and Greece be united on the same head." Finally, a regency is provided until Otto's majority, set on his 20th birthday on June 1, 1835.

With the dynastic question largely resolved, the powers' representatives resumed negotiations with the Sublime Porte to definitively settle the issue of Greek-Ottoman borders.

==== The question of Greek borders ====
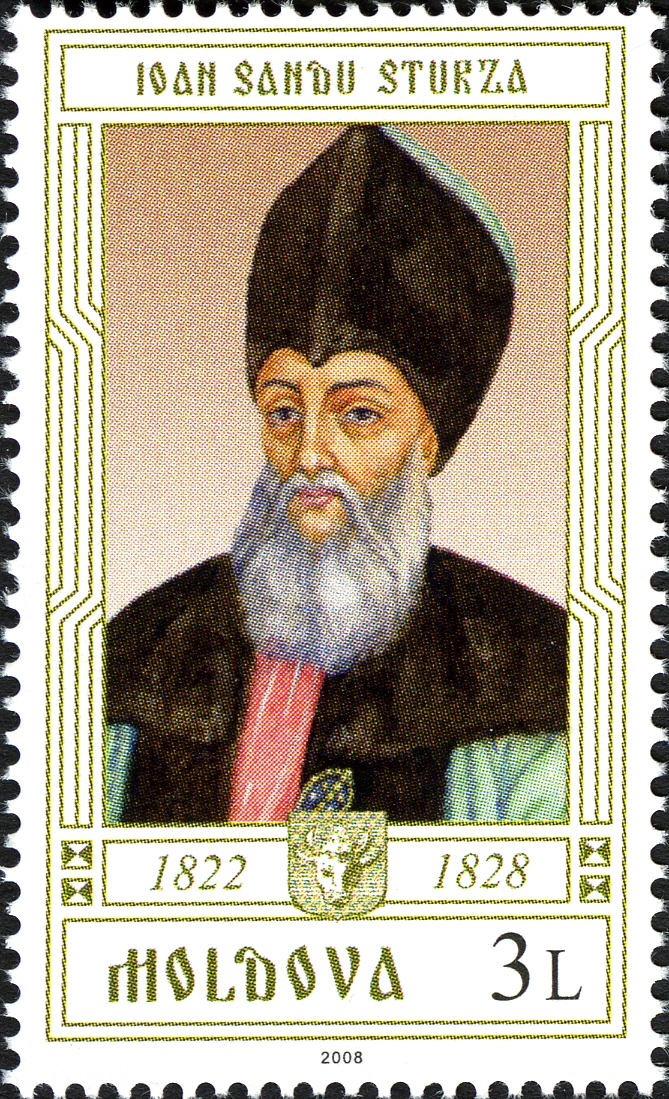
Moldavian stamp bearing the effigy of Ioan Sturdza, first prince of Samos

To guarantee Greece a more advantageous position than its former Ottoman ruler, representatives from the powers' governments were dispatched to the Ottoman capital to revise the border delineation outlined in the protocol of February 3, 1830. Following arduous negotiations (Note: These negotiations extended from February to July 1832.) with the Reis Effendi, the powers ultimately secured substantial concessions from the Porte. The Treaty of Constantinople, signed on July 21, 1832, establishes the new Greek-Turkish border along the Arta-Volos line, which traverses the Mount Othrys range to Mount Velouchi and bisects the Aspropotamos valley. In return, the Ottoman Empire, which had initially demanded Euboea as compensation, received only 40 million piastres from the Kingdom of Greece.

Subsequent discussions in London in August 1832 resulted in a resolution regarding the Aegean islands. Despite the absence of territorial gains for Greece in this region, the Ottoman Empire bestowed upon Samos a considerable degree of autonomy. The island was constituted as a vassal principality of the Porte and is governed by primates elected by notables. No Ottoman troops are permitted to station themselves there, and the sole representative of Constantinople is a Christian prince, appointed and dismissed by the Sultan. In exchange, the Turks are granted an annual tribute of 400,000 piastres and full recognition of their sovereignty over the island. Unlike its more distant northern neighbor, Crete remains under the control of Mehmet Ali's Egypt, which is now at war with the Ottoman Empire.

=== The organization of the future monarchy ===
==== The question of the regency ====
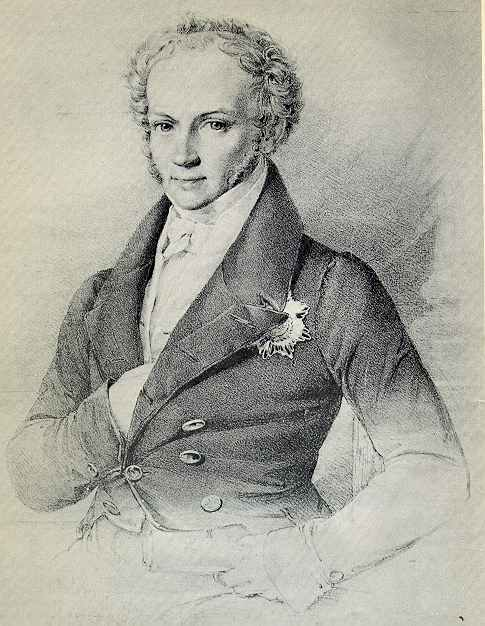
The Count of Armansperg.

Despite the ongoing political turbulence in Greece, King Otto has yet to arrive. The question of the regency has been a significant point of contention among European chancelleries and the Munich court for several weeks. Given Count von Armansperg's affiliation with the liberal movement, King Ludwig I is concerned that aligning with the most progressive Greek factions might result in a weakening of his son's authority. The question of the regency is definitively resolved only at the end of September 1832. At this point, a triumvirate is appointed to represent the crown until Otto I reaches the age of majority. The triumvirate includes the former Bavarian Prime Minister, Georg Ludwig von Maurer, former Minister of Justice, and General Carl Wilhelm von Heideck, a hero of the War of Independence.

==== The question of royal religion ====
Simultaneously, Count Potemkin, the Russian representative, presents King Ludwig I with an autographed letter from the Tsar in which Nicholas I underscores the paramount significance he attaches to Prince Otto's conversion to the Orthodox religion. The Bavarian monarch asserts that he cannot contravene his son's conscience, which is rooted in the Catholic faith, yet asserts that his progeny will be nurtured in the Greek religion. A rumor, which was subsequently refuted but persists in circulation, suggests that a matrimonial alliance between Otto and one of the Tsar's daughters has been concluded.

==== The Greek-Bavarian Friendship Treaty ====
After announcing the regents' selection, the Munich court welcomed three Greek deputies, duly appointed by their country, to extend greetings to the young Otto I. The three deputies were Andreas Miaoulis (an islander), Konstantinos Botsaris (from Rumelia), and Dimitrios Plapoutas (a Moreote who was closely associated with Kolokotronis). In the presence of the archimandrite of the Orthodox Church of Munich, the three men pledge their fealty to Otto.

On December 9 of the following year, an alliance treaty was signed between Bavaria and Greece. This treaty guaranteed the treaties of London and Constantinople and placed a Bavarian division of 3,500 men at the service of the Hellenic kingdom, replacing the French forces that had been present in the Peloponnese since the Morea expedition. Additionally, the treaty stipulated that it would be transformed into a family pact upon King Otto's majority.

== Consequences: establishment of the Bavarian monarchy ==
=== The Arrival of King Otto in Greece ===
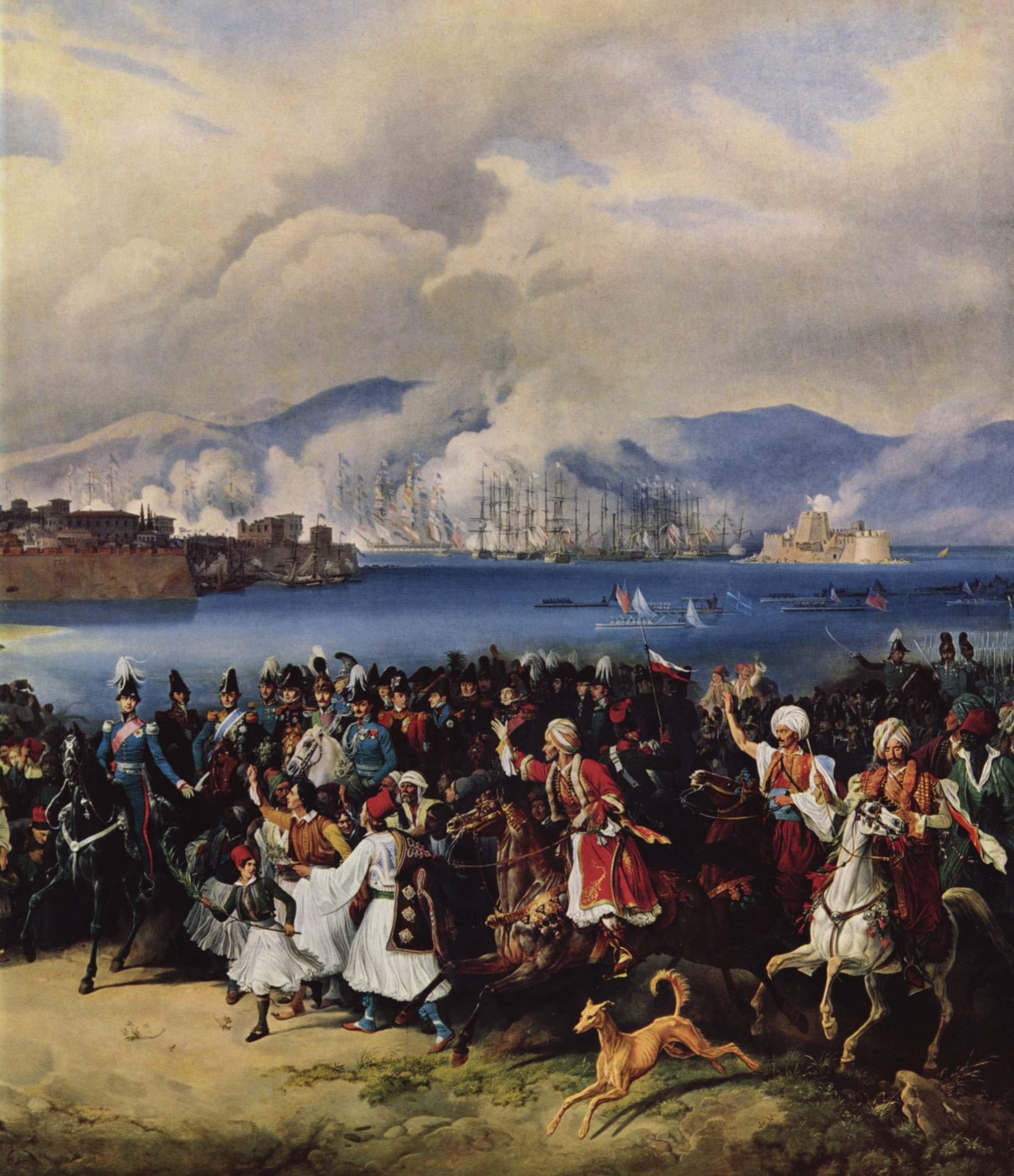
Otto's arrival in Nafplio by Peter von Hess (1835).

With the establishment of the new monarchy underway, Otto and the regents departed Munich on December 6, 1832, and proceeded to Trieste, where they boarded the English frigate Madagascar. They ultimately reached their destination of Nafplio on January 30, 1833, at precisely one o'clock in the afternoon. The following day, the Greek government arrived to pay their respects to the sovereign and the regents. However, it was only on February 6 (January 25 Julian) that they disembarked in Greece in a solemn ceremony. They were greeted with great enthusiasm, which was further amplified by Otto's declaration that he was "called to the throne by the Great Mediating Powers but also by the free suffrage of the Greeks."

=== The establishment of monarchical institutions ===
Following the establishment of the regency, the 1832 constitution was effectively superseded, resulting in the transformation of the new regime into a quasi-absolute monarchy. The regency exercised its authority through the issuance of ordinances that were given the force of law. The Greek justice system underwent a significant reorganization, resulting in the establishment of several new judicial institutions. These included courts of first instance, commercial courts, appellate courts, a court of cassation, and a court of accounts. Additionally, a civil code was introduced, and the press was subjected to monitoring. Most importantly, following a period of anarchy, the restoration of public order was achieved, and a significant number of educational institutions were constructed throughout the country.

Additionally, the Orthodox Church underwent a period of reorganization. Given the evident dependency of the Patriarchate of Constantinople on the Ottoman Sultan, the regency convened a council of the twenty-three bishops and archbishops of free Greece. In July 1833, the Greek Church was proclaimed autocephalous and organized into a permanent synod under the monarch's authority, who alone had the power to appoint bishops. However, this development was not unanimously accepted among the Greeks, as Otto remained Catholic, prompting some to view his ascension as the head of the national Church as heretical.

=== The choice of Athens as the new capital ===
Map of the Kingdom of Greece in 1832.

Since its liberation in December 1822, Nafplio had assumed the role of capital of the newly independent Greek state. The town is situated in the Gulf of Argos and constituted one of the most effectively fortified strongholds of the Mediterranean Sea at the time, due to its extensive network of fortifications. The economy of Nafplio, based on the trade of sponges, silk, wine, and oil, appeared to flourish in a Greece ravaged by the war against the Ottoman Empire. The city's Venetian heritage also manifested in the retention of several grand 18th-century buildings, one of which, a modest two-story structure with a facade of five windows, was selected to serve as the royal palace for King Otto. Despite these few assets, Nafplio hardly appeared to be a modern capital. With a population of approximately 6,000 at the time of the Bavarian sovereign's arrival, the city had no paved roads and most of its streets were in a disrepair state. Its main squares were covered with debris from the war, and more seriously, the aqueduct that was supposed to supply it with water was almost out of order, and the most basic goods were unavailable.

The atmosphere of Nafplio proved oppressive for the young Otto I, who took advantage of his elder brother, Crown Prince Maximilian of Bavaria, visiting in May 1833, to embark on an expedition across his country and visit the site of Athens. Impressed by the Parthenon ruins, the sovereign resolved to restore the city's splendor and establish it as the new capital of the resurgent Greece. However, it was not until August 28, 1834, that the city was formally designated as the capital, and construction commenced on infrastructure befitting a modern metropolis.

== See also ==
- First Hellenic Republic
- Kingdom of Greece
- Ioannis Kapodistrias
- Augustinos Kapodistrias
- Jérôme Bonaparte
- Eugène de Beauharnais
- Prince Louis, Duke of Nemours
- Pedro I of Brazil
- Prince Karl Theodor of Bavaria
- Leopold I of Belgium
- Demetrio Stefanopoli
- Prince Paul of Württemberg
- Prince Frederick of the Netherlands
- Otto of Greece
- 1862 Greek head of state referendum

== Bibliography ==
=== On the royal election ===
- Minet, Paul (1991). "King-Making in Nineteenth Century Greece". Royalty Digest. 1 (4): 106 et seq. ISSN 0967-5744.
- Standaert, F. S (1996). "Léopold de Saxe-Cobourg, prince Souverain de la Grèce". Museum Dynasticum (in French). VIII (2): 3–20. ISSN 0777-0936.

=== Books on personalities linked to the election ===
- Beales, ACF (1931). "The Irish King of Greece". Journal of Hellenic Studies. 51 (51): 101–105. doi:10.2307/627423. JSTOR 627423.
- Bower, Leonard (2001). Otho I : King of Greece, a biography. Royalty Digest. ISBN 1905159129.
- Corrêa da Costa, Sérgio (1995). Sérgio (in Portuguese). Rio de Janeiro, Paz e Terra. ISBN 978-85-219-0129-7.
- Defrance, Olivier (2004). Léopold Ier et le clan Cobourg (in French). Brussels: Éditions Racine. ISBN 978-2-87386-335-7.
- Nicol, Donald M (2002). The Immortal Emperor : The Life and Legend of Constantine Palaiologos, Last Emperor of the Romans. Cambridge: Cambridge University Press. ISBN 0-521-89409-3.
- de Nussac, Louis (1932). L'héritage français du royaume de Grèce et de l'empire d'Orient : Histoire d'une famille limousine de l'ancien régime au second empire et fin des derniers princes Comnènes (in French). Paris: Éditions internationales.
- Teyssier, Arnaud (2006). Les enfants de Louis-Philippe et la France (in French). Cambridge: Pygmalion. ISBN 2857049056.

=== Old documents relating to the election ===
- Comnène, Georges (1831). Sur la Grèce (in French). Paris: Imprimerie de Firmin Didot Frères. Archived from the original on October 9, 2017.
- Grove (1834). Notice sur la candidature du prince Paul de Wurtemberg à la couronne de Grèce, en 1830, pour établir la réclamation formée par M. Grove contre le prince (in French). Imprimerie de Carpentier-Méricourt.

=== History of Greece ===
- Brewer, David (2001). The Greek War of Independence : The Struggle for Freedom from Ottoman Oppression and the Birth of the Modern Greek Nation. New York: The Overlook Press. ISBN 1-58567-395-1.
- Contogeorgis, Georges (1992). Histoire de la Grèce. Nations d'Europe (in French). Paris: Hatier. ISBN 2-218-03841-2.
- Driault, Édouard; Lhéritier, Michel (1926a). Histoire diplomatique de la Grèce de 1821 à nos jours : L'Insurrection et l'Indépendance (1821-1830) (in French). Vol. I. PUF. Archived from the original on August 2, 2024.
- Driault, Édouard; Lhéritier, Michel (1926b). Histoire diplomatique de la Grèce de 1821 à nos jours : Le Règne d'Othon - La Grande Idée (1830-1862) (in French). Vol. II. PUF. Archived from the original on August 2, 2024.
- Koliopoulos, Giannis; Veremis, Thanos M. (2004). Greece : The Modern Sequel From 1821 to the Present. London: Hurst. ISBN 1-85065-463-8.
- Vacalopoulos, Apostolos (1975). Histoire de la Grèce moderne (in French). Horvath. ISBN 2-7171-0057-1.
- Woodhouse, C. M. (1965). The Battle of Navarino. London: Hodder et Stoughton.

=== General works ===
- Caron, Jean-Claude; Vernus, Michel (2008). L'Europe au XIXe siècle : Des nations aux nationalismes 1815-1914 (in French). Paris: Armand Colin. ISBN 978-2-200-21711-2.
- Duroselle, Jean-Baptiste (1996). L'Europe de 1815 à nos jours (in French). Vol. Nouvelle Clio. Paris: PUF. ISBN 2-13-045847-5.
- Tacel, Max (1997). Restaurations, révolutions, nationalités. 1815-1870 (in French). Paris: Armand Colin. ISBN 2-200-01495-3.
- St Clair, William (2008). That Greece might still be free. The Philhellenes in the war of independence. Cambridge: Open Book Publishers. ISBN 9781906924010.
