= Greek Senate (1829) =

A new legislative body called the Senate (Greek: Γερουσία) was created in 1829 by the Fourth National Assembly at Argos, replacing the prior advisory body called the Panellinion which had been founded by Governor Ioannis Kapodistrias the previous year.

== History ==
The Senate had a total of 120 Senators. The Fourth National Assembly at Argos had decreed that 21 of them would be selected by the Governor out of a pool three times that number, selected by the Assembly, while the other 6 would be appointed directly by the Governor. The Senate's function was advisory on all non-administrative votes.

Elected to the office of President of the Senate was Georgios Sisinis.

When Kapodistrias was assassinated in 1831, the Senate transferred the Executive Powers to a three-person Administrative Committee on 20 December 1831, presided by Kapodistrias' brother Augustinos. The other members of the Committee were Theodoros Kolokotronis and Ioannis Kolettis. The Committee was dissolved in March 1832 after Augustinos left.

On 28 March 1832, a new 5 person Administrative Committee was created with Georgios Kountouriotis, Alexander Ypsilantis, Andreas Zaimis, Markos Botsaris, and Spyridon Trikoupis.

On 27 July 1832, the Fifth National Assembly at Nafplion dismisses the Senate however the Senate does not acknowledge this decision.

On 21 September 1832, the Senate appoints a new 3 person Administrative Committee to hold executive power.

Finally, in January 1833 the Senate was permanently dismissed with the arrival of King Otto.

With the enactment of the Greek Constitution of 1844, a new legislative body was created also with the name Senate.

== Senators ==
- Georgios Sisinis
- Dimitris Plapoutas
- Andreas Kalamogdartis
- Andreas Miaoulis
- Georgios Douzinas
- Andreas Zaimis
- Ioannis Peroukas
- Tatsi Magginas
- Georgios Antonopoulos
- Georgios Mavrommatis

== See also ==
- Greek Senate
