= Fourth National Assembly at Argos =

Greek national assembly in 1829

- 11 July - 6 August 1829
Party	Leader	Seats
Filiki Eteria		8
French Party		5
English Party		2
Russian Party	Andreas Metaxas	2
This lists parties that won seats. See the complete results below.

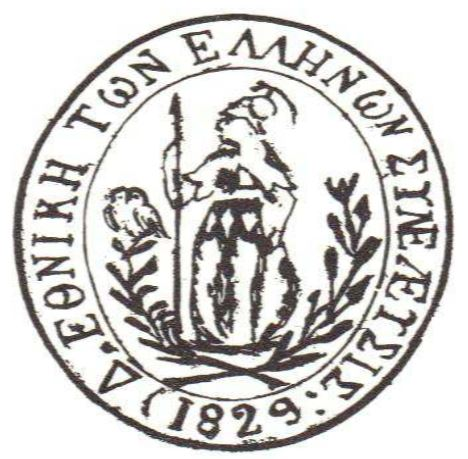
Seal of the national assembly

The Fourth National Assembly at Argos (Greek: Δʹ Εθνοσυνέλευση Άργους) was a Greek convention which sat at Argos from 11 July to 6 August 1829, during the Greek War of Independence.

The Fourth National Assembly followed on from the Third National Assembly at Troezen (1827), which had adopted a new constitution and selected Ioannis Kapodistrias as Governor of Greece with extensive powers for a seven-year term. The Assembly counted 236 representatives from all over Greece (including territories, such as Crete or Macedonia, that were still under Ottoman control), for the first time elected via suffrage.

The Assembly adopted a series of reforms suggested by Kapodistrias, most notably:

- the replacement of the Panellinion advisory council with a 27-member Senate
- the adoption of the phoenix as the country's currency

== Members of the National Assembly ==
- Andreas Metaxas leader of the Russian Party
- Theodoros Kolokotronis (Russian Party)
- Spyridon Trikoupis (English Party)
- Ioannis Orlandos (English Party)
- Yannis Makriyannis (French Party)
- Ioannis Kolettis (French Party)
- Dimitrios Voulgaris (French Party)
- Benizelos Roufos (French Party)
- Georgios Kountouriotis (French Party)
- Dimitris Plapoutas
- Vasileios Dimitrakopoulos
- Georgios Sisinis member of Filiki Eteria
- Anagnostis Matsoukas
- Andreas Zaimis
- Sotirios Theocharopoulos member of Filiki Eteria
- Georgios Michalakis
- Andreas Kalamogdartis
- Nikitas Stamatelopoulos
- Rigas Palamidis
- Anagnostis Kondakis
- Mitros Anastasopoulos
- Kostas Botsaris
- Theophilos Kairis
- Dimitris Tsokris
- Dimitris Perroukas
- Anagnostis Makrypoukamisos
- Georgios M. Antonopoulos
- Georgios Agallopoulos
- Iakovos Paximadis
- Petrobey Mavromichalis
- Georgios Mavromichalis
- Tatsis Magginas
- Panagiotis Dimitrakopoulos
- Frangiskos Mavros
- Georgios Chrysidis
- Panagiotis Naoum member of Filiki Eteria
- Lykourgos Logothetis member of Filiki Eteria
- Konstantinos Bellios
- Chatzilias Oikonomou
- Christoforos Perraivos member of Filiki Eteria
- Drosos Mansolas
- Georgios Ainian member of Filiki Eteria
- Gerogios Psyllas
- Stamos Staikos
- Andreas Iskos
- Anagnostis Monarchidis
- Georgios Daskalopoulos
- Vasileios N. Boudouris
- Emmanouil Tombazis
- Anagnostis Anastasopoulos
- Loukas Rallis
- Christodoulos Klonaris
- Athanasios Tsakalov member of Filiki Eteria
- Antonios Georgantas
- Anagnostis Chatzianargyrou
- Manouil Vernardos member of Filiki Eteria
- Georgios Logiotatidis
- Vasileios Petimezas
- Panagiotis Zapheiropoulos
- Nikolaos Poniropoulos
- Konstantinos Metaxas
- Nikolaos Spiliadis
- Lysandros Vilaetis
- Konstantios, Metropolitan of Maroneia
- Georgios Valtinos
- Konstantinos Schinas
- Georgios Mavrommatis
