= Georgios Psyllas =

Greek scholar, editor and politician

Georgios Psyllas (Greek: Γεώργιος Ψύλλας; 1794–1878) was a Greek scholar and politician, and editor during the Greek War of Independence of the newspaper Efimeris ton Athinon.

== First years: studies in Europe ==
Georgios Psyllas was born in Athens in 1794. After completing his basic education in his birthplace, he continued his studies in Europe, as a scholar of Philomousos Eteria of Athens. At first he went to Trieste and then in Pisa (October 1816), where he met Panagiotis Kordikas and the Metropolitan Ignatius of Hungarovlachia. From that time the Philomousos Eteria of Vienna took on his cost of staying abroad. In early October 1817, at the urging of the Countess Elding, wife of the Duke of Weimar and spokesperson of the Philomousos Eteria of Vienna, he went to Jena. There he was influenced by the movement of liberalism of which the University of Jena was one of the major foci. The murder of a student and the riots which followed made the Greek students leave the city and continue their studies at the University of Göttingen. He heard about the Revolution when he was in Berlin and he immediately decided to return to serve in the Greek revolution.

== Return to Athens: political career ==
After various adventures he returned to Athens. He was elected as member of the "Ephorate of Athens". When Omer Vrioni arrived in Attica and the Athenians abandoned the city, he fled to Aegina, where he developed significant activity. He was distinguished as a representative in the National Assemblies of Epidaurus and Astros and for a short period (January–February 1822) he served as second secretary of the Legislative Corps. In 1824, upon the recommendation of the English colonel Leicester Stanhope, Psyllas undertook the publication of the Εφημερίς των Αθηνών ("Newspaper of Athens", August 1824 – April 1826).

Later, Psyllas was appointed by Ioannis Kapodistrias as member of the Panellinion and first secretary of the Department of the Interior (January 1828) and three months later (April 1828) as Emergency Commissioner of Lower Messenia. In 1829, he was elected as plenipotentiary of Attica in the Fourth National Assembly at Argos and afterwards as a judge in the Cyclades (he did not accept the position). Then he moved to Aegina where he wrote the Dictionary compendium of the old Greek language into the present one, which was published in Athens in 1836.

Following the arrival of King Otto he was appointed by the Regency as commander of Euboea (March 1833) and a month later as Secretary of State (i.e., Minister) for Internal Affairs. From this position he worked for the placement of the first prefects, the restoration of the fighters and the selection of the new capital of the state, for which he strongly supported the candidacy of Athens. After the discovery of the conspiracy that led to the trial of Theodoros Kolokotronis, he was removed from the Council of Ministers (October 1833) and became prefect of Attica and Euboea and State Counsellor. In May 1834 he was transferred to the prefecture of Euboea and one year later he was dismissed after von Armansperg’s intervention. He remained as unpaid State Counsellor until 1844, when he was appointed senator. This position gave him the opportunity to express his liberal and humanitarian ideas.

In May 1854, Psyllas took over the Ministry of Ecclesiastical Affairs and Public Education in the government of Alexandros Mavrokordatos that was formed during the Crimean War. But the serious health problems that he had and the unfavorable political situation forced him to resign a month later. The resignation followed his commendation from the King with the Silver Cross of the Order of the Redeemer. After the eviction of Otto and during the Interregnum period (1862-1863) he declined to be involved in politics. When the Council of State was established according to the provisions of the Greek Constitution of 1864, he agreed to take over the vice-presidency of this short-lived advisory body which was abolished in November 1865. This was his last public position.

From May 1867 he concentrated on writing his memoirs, which were completed in September 1869. He died of pneumonia in Athens on 18 January 1878.

He was married to Margarita Vitali, with whom he had six children: Filippos, Andreas, Iosif, Alexandros, Kleopatra and Viktoria.

== Bibliography ==
- Ioannis Arsenis, Michael Rafaelovits (1881). Ποικίλη Στοά: Εθνική εικονογραφημένη επετηρίς, Έτος 1/16, 1881-1914. Athens: Εστία. Retrieved September 10th 2009.
- Dimitrios Gatopoulos, "Τα ανέκδοτα απομνημονεύματα του Αθηναίου Αγωνιστού Γ. Ψύλλα”, Το Νέον Κράτος, issue 34, p. 657-666
- Dimitrios Gatopoulos, "Το δεύτερο μέρος των ανέκδοτων απομνημονευμάτων του Γ. Ψύλλα”, Το Νέον Κράτος, issue 35, p. 721-730
- Dimitrios Gatopoulos, "Το τρίτο μέρος των ανέκδοτων απομνημονευμάτων του Γ. Ψύλλα”, Το Νέον Κράτος, issue 36, p. 812-822
- Reggina Katsimardou, "Ο Γεώργιος Ψύλλας μέσα από το Αρχείο της Φιλομούσου Εταιρείας των Αθηνών", Τεκμήρια Ιστορίας, Historical and Ethnological society of Greece, 2015, p. 22-29
- N. K. Louros, "Ο Γεώργιος Ψύλλας και η Αθήνα", Νέα Εστία, issue 1386, p. 436-449
