= Lysandros Vilaetis =

Greek politician and chief of Pyrgos

Lysandros Vilaetis Λύσανδρος Βιλαέτης
- Born: Elis, Greece
- Died: Greece
- Occupations: politician, president of the Greek Parliament

Lysandros Vilaetis (Greek: Λύσανδρος Βιλαέτης) was a chief of Pyrgos and a Greek politician elected from 1823 until 1864. He descended from a noted family of Pyrgos in which he was one of the first who inhabited the area. He was a representative of Elis in the Second National Assembly at Astros in 1823, in the Third National Assembly at Troezen, in the Fourth National Assembly at Argos, in the Fifth National Assembly at Nafplion, in the Third of September National Assembly of the Greeks at Athens and in the Second National Assembly of the Greeks at Athens in 1862.

In 1848, Lysandros Vilaetis revolted along with approximately 80 comrades who ran into Pyrgos. He left for Zakynthos when the movement failed. He was finally pardoned in 1849.
