= Georgios Sisinis =

Greek politician

- Γεώργιος Σισίνης
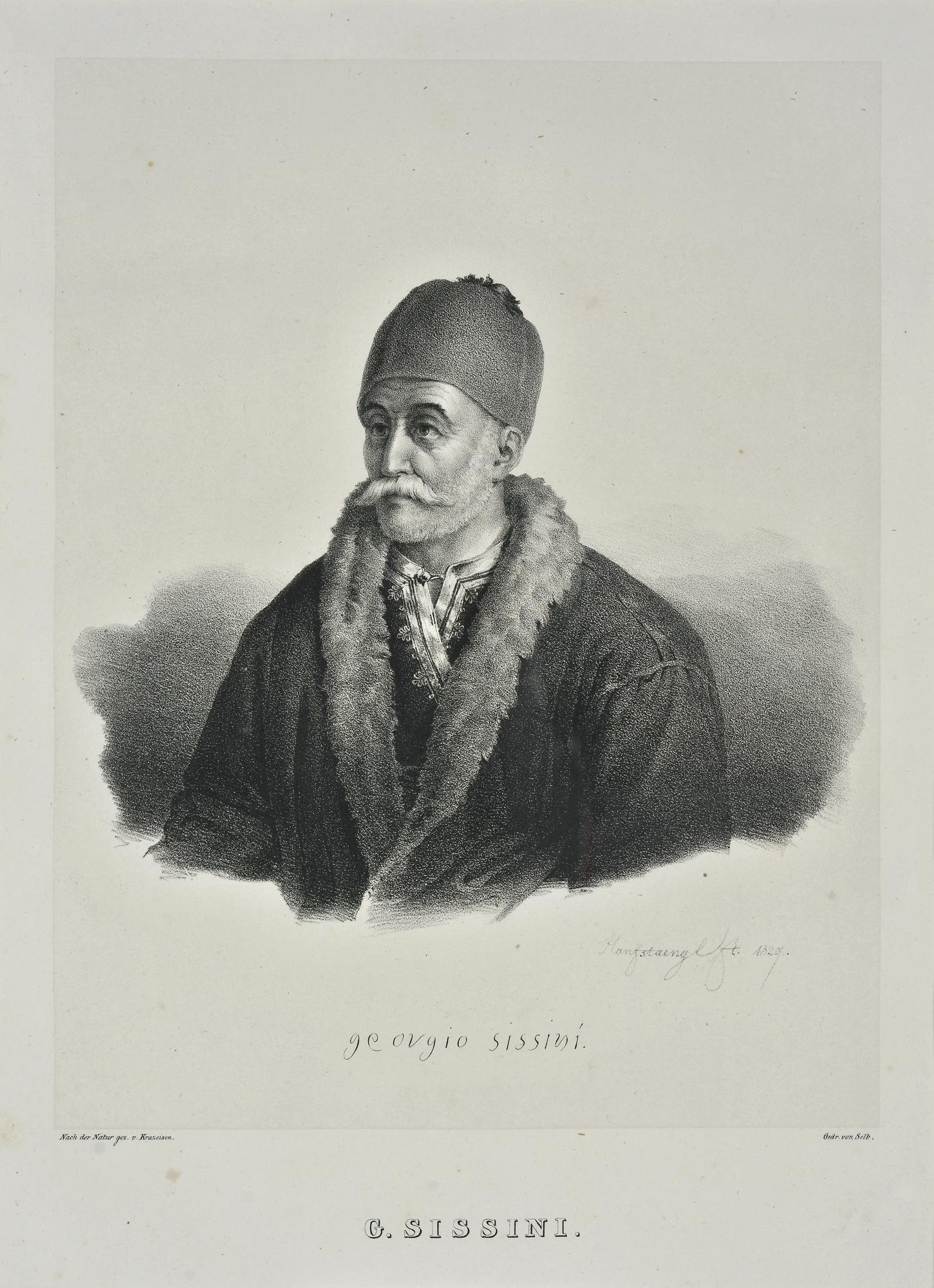
- A portrait of Georgios Sisinis by Karl Krazeisen

President of the Senate
- In office 1828–1831
- Governor: Ioannis Kapodistrias

Personal details
- Born: 1769 Gastouni, Morea Eyalet, Ottoman Empire (now Greece)
- Died: 1831 (aged 61–62) Gastouni, First Hellenic Republic
- Spouse: Yakinthi Stathakopoulou
- Children: Michail Sisinis; Chrysanthos Sisinis
- Profession: Physician; Politician

Military service
- Allegiance: (Greece) First Hellenic Republic
- Branch/service: Hellenic Army
- Battles/wars: Greek War of Independence; Siege of Patras; Battle of Lalas; Siege of Chlemoutsi; Greek Civil Wars

Georgios Sisinis (Greek: Γεώργιος Σισίνης, 1769–1831) was a Greek revolutionary leader and politician of the Greek War of Independence.

== Biography ==
He was born in Gastouni in Elis, to a rich and historic family of the area. Georgios, his father Chrysanthos and his three brothers, who died young, were all physicians. During the Ottoman rule, he was a primate (prokritos) of Gastouni.

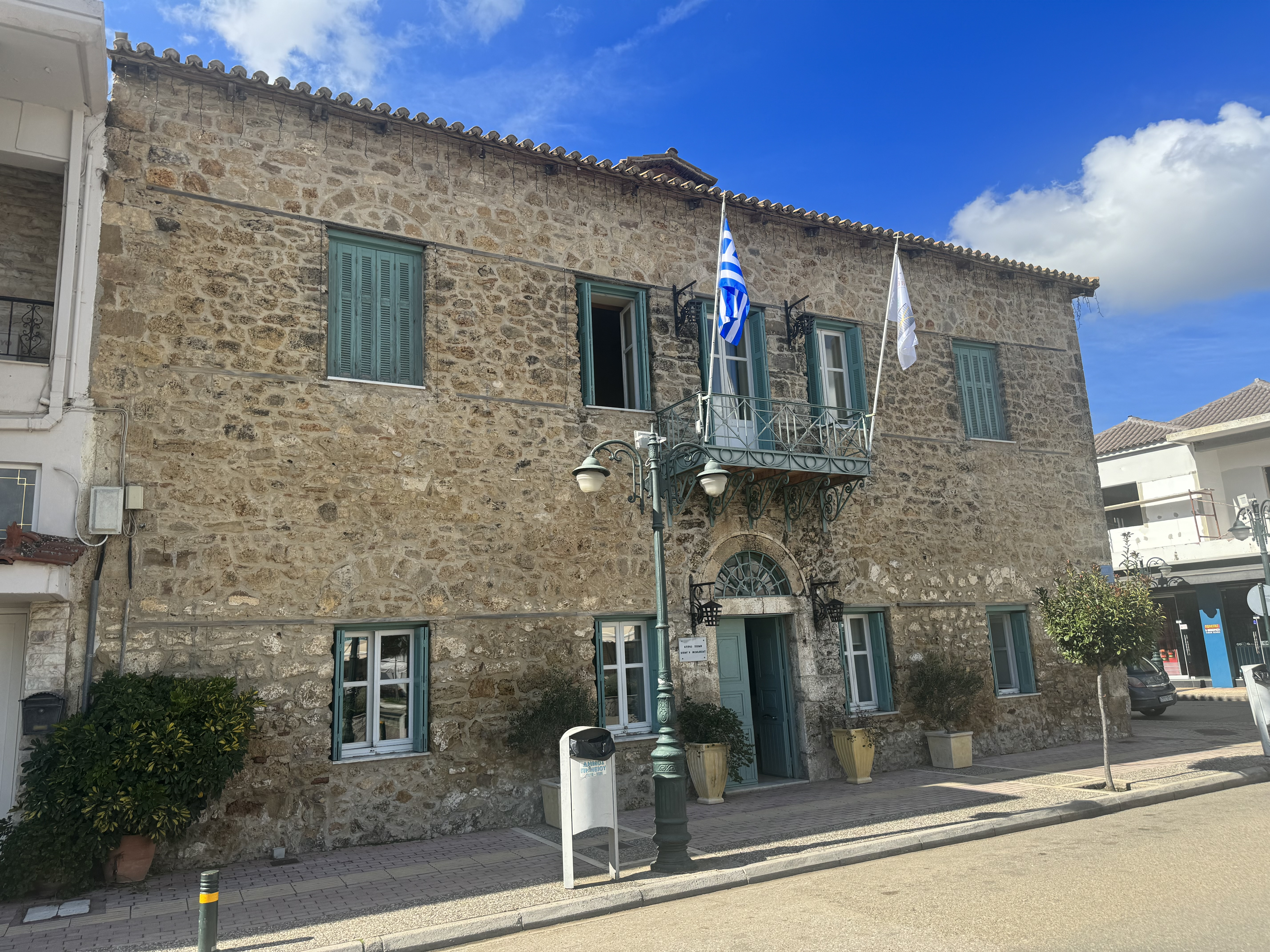
House of Sisinis in Gastouni

He became a member of the Filiki Eteria in 1819. In 1821, as the Ottoman authorities suspected the Greeks of planning a revolution, he was requested to come to Tripolitsa along with other primates; at the suggestion of Germanos of Old Patras, he feigned illness and did not attend. Sisinis proclaimed the start of the Greek War of Independence in Elis, and was one of the most important contributors to the Greek struggle. He provided the Greek troops in the Peloponnese with provisions, and distinguished himself in the battles of Patras, Lala and of Chlemoutsi.

As a politician, he was elected representative of Elis in the Second National Assembly at Astros, and was chairman of the Third National Assembly at Troezen and of the Fourth National Assembly at Argos. In early 1825, during the Greek civil wars of 1824–1825 he and his son Chrysanthos Sisinis were arrested and imprisoned in Hydra. Released in spring, they returned to an active part in the military operations.

Under Governor Ioannis Kapodistrias, he was appointed a member of the Panellinion, and in 1829 he was named president of its successor, the Senate. He resigned following disagreements with Kapodistrias, but was not involved in the Governor's assassination in 1831, which he condemned.

He married Yakinthi Stathakopoulou and had two sons, Michail and Chrysanthos.

He died at Gastouni in 1831.

His descendants include the writer David Patrikarakos.
