= Anagnostis Anastasopoulos =

Greek politician

- Αναγνώστης Αναστασόπουλος
- Occupation: Politician Fighter

Anagnostis Anastasopoulos (Greek: Αναγνώστης Αναστασόπουλος) was a Greek politician and fighter in the Greek Revolution of 1821.

== Biography ==
He was from the village of Ligourio, Peloponnese. He served as a soldier and fought in the siege of Nafplio. He later followed a political career and became a senator in the Peloponnesian Senate and a deputy in the Fourth National Assembly at Argos.
