= Efimeris ton Athinon =

The Efimeris ton Athinon (Greek: Eφημερίς των Αθηνών, "Newspaper of Athens") was the first newspaper that was published in Athens. The public announcement for the publication of the newspaper took place on 18 July 1824 and the first issue of the newspaper was released on 20 August. It was printed in Salamis where the ephors of Athens temporarily sent the press for fear of raids by the Ottoman garrison of Chalkis. The next sheet was printed normally in Athens on 6 September. 103 sheets were released the first year, until 30 October 1825 and 37 sheets were issued during the second year, with the last sheet on 15 April 1826, when its publication was abruptly stopped.

The Efimeris ton Athinon used the current popular language (Demotic Greek) and regularly carried news of the ongoing Greek War of Independence. Along with these current affairs, there are also articles on the political system, the institutions and laws, the Press and media, the role of the "newspaperwriter" and politics. What distinguishes this newspaper was the presentation of texts on poetry and literature. In addition the newspaper carried news about the Filomousos Society of Athens, in the establishment of the Philanthropic Society in Nafplion, letters by scholars on various topics and general news from abroad.

Georgios Psyllas was the director of the newspaper. The newspaper was printed on a press that the envoy of the Philhellenic Society of London, Colonel Leicester Stanhope, donated to the Community of Athens.

== Bibliography ==
- G. Psyllas, Εφημερίς Αθηνών" 1824-1826, Βιβλιοπωλείον των Βιβλιοφίλων- Σπάνια Βιβλία Σπανός, Athens, 1981
- D. Gatopoulos, "Το τρίτον μέρος των ανέκδοτων απομνημονευμάτων του Γ. Ψύλλα", Το Νέον Κράτος, issue 36, p. 812-822
- N. E. Skiadas, "Το πρώτο τυπογραφείο της Αθήνας και ο Άγγλος Φιλέλλην Στάνχοπ", Τα Αθηναϊκά, issue 37, p. 19-23
