= Chrysanthos Sisinis (died 1845) =

Greek revolutionary leader and politician

Chrysanthos Sisinis Χρύσανθος Σισίνης
- Born: Gastouni, now Greece
- Died: 1845; Greece
- Occupations: Greek revolutionary, politician

Chrysanthos Sisinis (Greek: Χρύσανθος Σισίνης, died 1845) was a Greek revolutionary leader and a politician.

He was born in Gastouni and was the son of Georgios Sisinis. He fought at the battles of Patras, Athens, Messolongi and several other battles. He was jailed together with his father in the civil period as an adherent of Kolokotronis. After his release, he entered politics and was elected many times as a representative for Elis. He died in 1845.
