= Georgios Mavrommatis =

Greek politician

Georgios Mavrommatis (Greek: Γεώργιος Μαυρομμάτης; Katouna, 1771 – Athens, 1836) was a Greek politician.

== Biography ==
He was the son of the kodjabashi Mitsos Mavrommatis, and the father of Anastasios Mavrommatis, also a politician. He acted as senator, deputy in the national assemblies of Epidaurus in 1821, Troezen in 1827 and Argos in 1829. He was the emergency governor of western Sporades and then of Achaea in 1828 – 1829. He was the Finance Minister in the government of 1827.
