= Sotirios Theocharopoulos =

Greek fighter and politician

Sotirios Theocharopoulos (Greek: Σωτήριος Θεοχαρόπουλος; Agia Varvara, Akrata, ? – died 10 February [O.S. 22 February] 1854) was a Greek fighter of the Greek Revolution of 1821 and politician.

== Biography ==
He was born in Agia Varvara, Akrata and soon became a kodjabashi of the area.

In 1819 he entered the Filiki Eteria, to which he donated a large part of his fortune. He took part in the gathering of Vostitsa in January 1821, while he later refused to heed to the summon of all kodjabashis by the Pasha of Tripoli. He organised a military force and signed the historic letter of the kodjabashis of Achaea declaring the revolution on 26 March 1821 in Saint George's square in Patras. He took part in the battles of Korinthos, Athens, Tripoli and Patras. In 1824 he was declared general. In 1826 and 1829 he was elected as a deputy in the National Assemblies.

After the end of the revolution he acted as the treasurer of Achaea and Ileia (1835), while under king Otto he acted as a senator and member of parliament. He died on 10 February 1854.
