= Greek Constitution of 1827 =

The Greek Constitution of 1827 was signed and ratified in June 1827 by the Third National Assembly at Troezen, during the latter stages of the Greek War of Independence. The Constitution represented the first major step towards realizing a centralised system of Government, pooling together some of the more disparate elements of the liberation struggle. The Third National Assembly initially convened in Piada (now Nea Epidavros) in 1826 and subsequently in Troezen in 1827. After unanimously electing John Capodistria as the Governor of Greece for a seven-year term, it voted for the Political Constitution of Greece (Greek: Πολιτικόν Σύνταγμα της Ελλάδος, romanized: Politikón Syntagma tis Elládos). The Assembly wanted to give the country a stable government, modeled on democratic and liberal ideas. For this reason, it declared for the first time the principle of popular sovereignty: "Sovereignty lies with the people; every power derives from the people and exists for the people". This key democratic principle was repeated in all the Greek Constitutions after 1864.

== Features ==
The Constitution consisted of 150 articles. It established a strict separation of powers, vesting the executive power to the Governor and assigning to the body of the representatives of the people, named Vouli, the legislative power. The Governor only had a suspending veto on the bills, and he lacked the right to dissolve the Parliament. He was 'inviolable', while the Secretaries of the State, in other words the Ministers, assumed the responsibility for his public actions (thus introducing into the text of the 1827 Constitution the first elements of the so-called 'parliamentary principle'). The Constitution was also comparatively developed in its approach to human rights for the time.

== Definition of Greekness ==
Paragraph 6 provided a definition of who is to be considered a Greek:

- Those natives of Greece who believe in Christ
- Those under Ottoman yoke who believe in Christ and come to Greek territory to fight for it or to live in it
- Those born in any country who have a Greek father
- Those, either natives or not, as well as their children, who were citizens of another state before the publication of this constitution and come to Greece and take the Greek Oath
- Those aliens who shall come and be naturalised as citizens (criteria and procedure regulated in paragraphs 30–35)

As a formal sign of naturalisation, the Constitution includes the so-called Greek Oath: "I swear in the name of the All-Highest and of the fatherland to always come to the assistance of the freedom and well-being of my nation, sacrificing for it even my life, if the need should arise. Further I swear to submit to the laws of my fatherland, to respect the rights of my co-citizens, and to fulfill without fail the obligations of a citizen."
