= Panellinion =

Advisory body created on 23 April 1828 by Ioannis Kapodistrias

The Panellinion (Greek: Πανελλήνιον) was the name given to the advisory body created on 23 April 1828 by Ioannis Kapodistrias, replacing the Legislative Body, as one of the terms he set to assume the governorship of the new country. The Panellinion was later replaced by the Senate during the Fourth National Assembly at Argos in July 1829. The body was named after the Panhellenion, a league of Greek city-states established by Emperor Hadrian.

The Panellinion had 27 members, split into three departments.

Before publishing Kapodistrias' decision regarding the 1829 elections, the Governor added 9 new members to overcome the obstructions he faced by the Panellinion. With the majority now on his side, he had support for his actions.

== Notable members ==
Among the members of the Panellinion were:

- Georgios Kountouriotis, minister of finance
- Ioannis Kolettis
- Petrobey Mavromichalis
- Nikolaos Spiliadis
- Viaros Kapodistrias, brother of Governor Kapodistrias and lawyer from Corfu, appointed by Kapodistrias
- Ioannis Gennatas, lawyer from Corfu, appointed by Kapodistrias
- Georgios Sisinis
- Andreas Metaxas
- Christodoulos Klonaris
- Tatsis Magginas
- Nikolaos Renieris
- Andreas Zaimis
- Lykourgos Logothetis
- Andreas Kalamogdartis
- Alexandros Mavrokordatos
- Rigas Palamidis
- Panos Ragos
- Georgios Psyllas
- Constantinos Zografos
- Christodoulos Ainian
- Alexandros Kontostavlos
- Georgios Stavros

== Committees ==
The committees of the Panellinion were:

=== Internal affairs ===
- Andreas Zaimis, president
- Georgios Psyllas
- Christodoulos Ainian

=== Military affairs ===
- Petrobey Mavromichalis
- Constantinos Zografos
- Christodouloas Klonaris

=== Finance ===
- Georgios Kountouriotis
- Nikolaos Spiliadis
- A. Papadopoulos

=== Secretary ===
Spyridon Trikoupis was initially appointed but was later replaced by Spiliadis.
