= Andreas Zaimis =

Greek freedom fighter and government leader (1791–1840)

- Ανδρέας Ζαΐμης
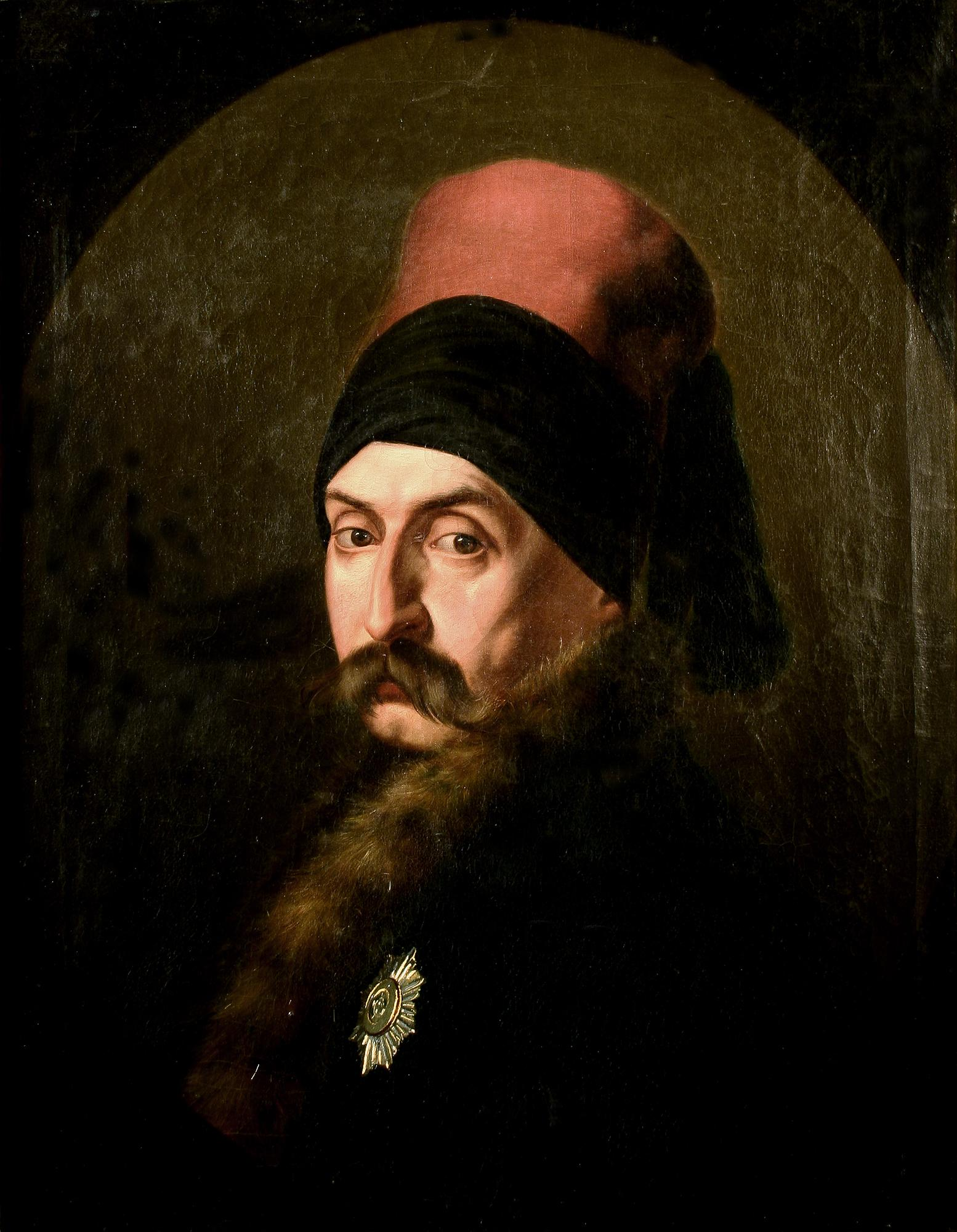

President of the Provisional Administration of Greece
- In office 18 April 1826 – 26 March 1827
- Preceded by: Georgios Kountouriotis
- Succeeded by: Vice-gubernatorial Committee of 1827; Ioannis Kapodistrias (as Governor of Greece)

Personal details
- Born: 1791 Kerpini, Kalavryta, Ottoman Empire
- Died: 4 May 1840 (aged 49) Athens, Greece
- Spouse: Eleni Deligianni

Andreas Asimakis Zaimis (Greek: Ανδρέας Ζαΐμης; 1791 – 4 May 1840) was a Greek freedom fighter and government leader during the Greek War of Independence.

== Biography ==
Andreas Zaimis was born in 1791 in Kerpini, Achaea, into a prominent local family. His father, Asimakis Zaimis, a notable of Kalavryta, is traditionally credited with raising the banner of the Greek Revolution at the Monastery of Agia Lavra on 17 March 1821. Initiated at an early age into the Filiki Eteria, Andreas abandoned his studies in Italy in order to take an active part in the struggle for national liberation.

During the Greek War of Independence, Zaimis participated in several key military operations, including the siege of Patras in 1822 and the defense of Missolonghi. In 1822, he was elected a delegate to the First National Assembly of Epidaurus, contributing to the initial efforts toward the institutional organization of the revolutionary Greek state. Following the fall of Missolonghi in 1826, and during the suspension of the Third National Assembly, Zaimis was appointed, by decision of the national assemblies, President of the Administrative Committee of Greece, assuming temporary governance and the continuation of the national resistance.

Under the administration of Ioannis Kapodistrias, Zaimis was appointed a member of the Panellinion, the supreme consultative body of the newly established state. In 1837, he became a Councillor of State, a position he held until his death in Athens in 1840.

Andreas Zaimis married Eleni Deligianni, daughter of Ioannis Deligiannis, a notable from Langadia. They had one son, Thrasyvoulos, and a grandson, Alexandros, both of whom followed his political path and later served as Prime Ministers of Greece.

Zaimis took part in the Assembly of Vostitsa, during which he engaged in a heated verbal dispute with Papaflessas. Zaimis refused to accept Papaflessas's claims of guaranteed Russian support for the forthcoming uprising—claims that were later proven unfounded. Zaimis's contribution to the struggle for Greek independence and his enduring patriotism were praised by prominent historians and statesmen, including Charilaos Trikoupis and Giannis Vlachogiannis, as well as by numerous other contemporaries and later commentators.

Political offices
| Preceded by Georgios Kountouriotis | President of the Administrative Committee; 18 April 1826 – 26 March 1827 | Succeeded by Vice-gubernatorial Committee of 1827 |
