= Third National Assembly at Troezen =

Greek national assembly in 1827

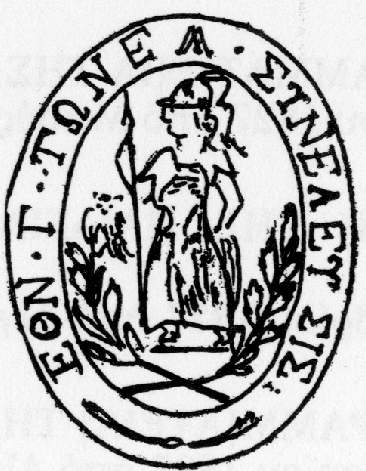
Seal of the III National Assembly at Troezen

The Third National Assembly at Troezen (Greek: Γʹ Εθνοσυνέλευση της Τροιζήνας) was a Greek national assembly that convened at Troezen in 1827 during the latter stages of the Greek war of independence. Its aim was to complete the work of the 1826 'Third National Assembly of Epidaurus' - which had been interrupted due to the war events. The Third National Assembly at Trozen eventually ratified the first definitive charter of the First Hellenic Republic, the "Political Constitution of Greece". Additionally, statesman Ioannis Capodistrias was elected as the first Governor of the Hellenic State.

== Convening of the Assembly ==
The long-delayed Third National Assembly was initially convened in April 1826 at Piada, but cut short by the news of the Fall of Missolonghi. Attempts to arrange a new Assembly in the autumn also failed due to disagreements among the various factions. Instead, two rival assemblies were established at Aegina and Kastri. Finally, after much deliberation, all parties agreed to participate in an assembly at Troezen. 168 delegates assembled there on 19 March 1827, under the chairmanship of Georgios Sisinis.

== Election of Capodistrias ==
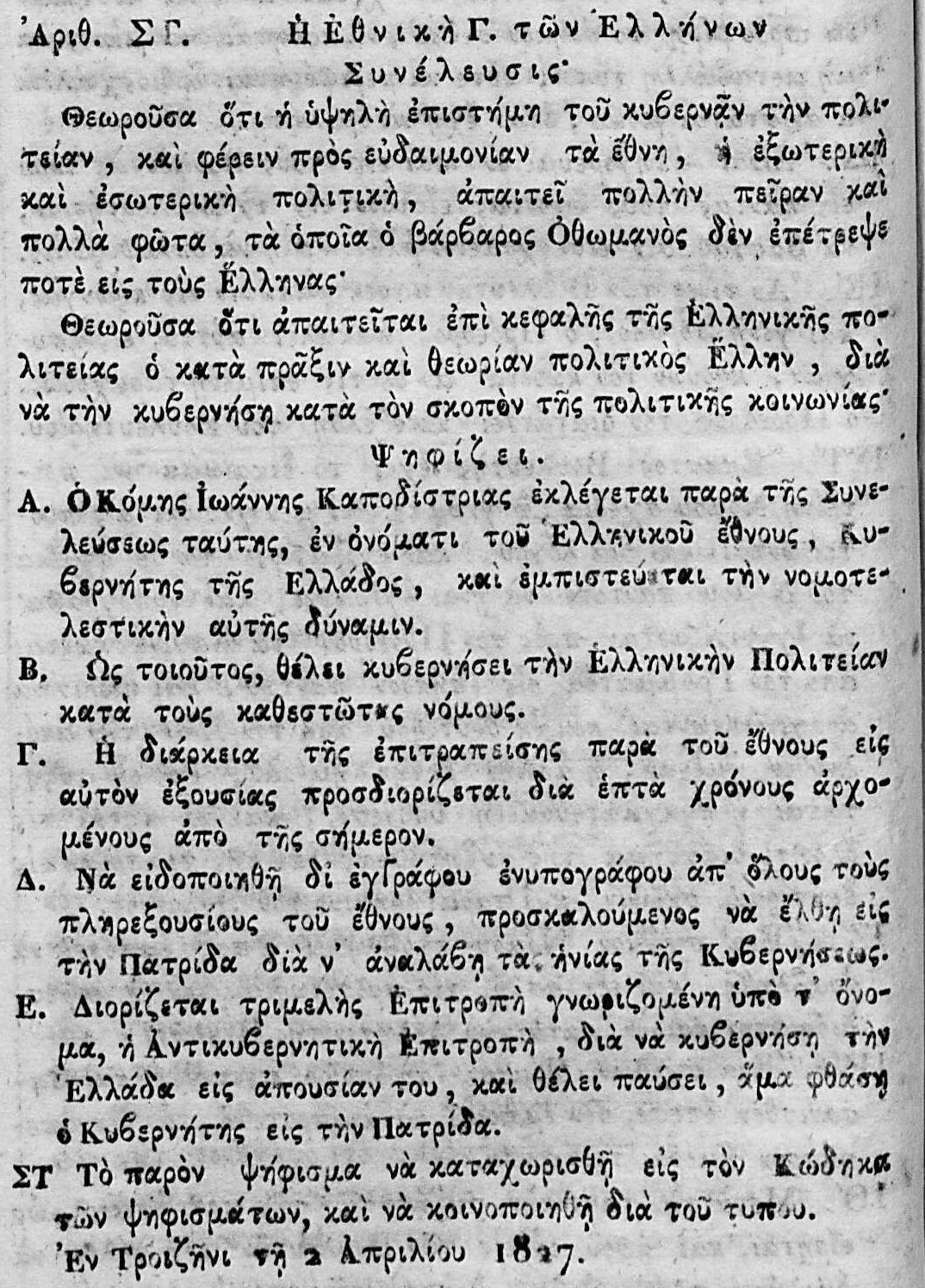
The election of Capodistrias

Having suffered from internal dissensions, the Assembly decided to create a supreme post to preside over the Executive, creating thus the office of Governor of Greece, to which it elected the then most distinguished Greek, Count Ioannis Kapodistrias, for a seven-year term, on April 3. A Governmental Commission was set up to administer Greece until his arrival.

== The new Constitution ==
On 1 May, the Assembly approved by vote of the Political Constitution of Greece. For the first time, the Constitution was not labeled "Provisional", signaling the Greek aspirations for complete independence from the Ottoman Empire. This Constitution consisted of 150 articles. It established key principles in Greek Constitutional history which remain to this day, such as the statement "Sovereignty lies with the people; every power derives from the people and exists for the people". It established a strict separation of powers, vesting the executive power to the Governor and assigning to the body of the representatives of the people, named Boule, the legislative power. The Governor only had a suspending veto on the bills, and lacked the right to dissolve the Parliament. He was inviolable, while the Secretaries of the State, in other words the Ministers, assumed the responsibility for his public actions (thus introducing into the text of the 1827 Constitution the first elements of the so-called parliamentary principle).

On 4 May 1827, a day before its dissolution, the Assembly also voted for establishing Nafplion as the capital of Greece and seat of both parliament and government.
