= Executive of 1822 =

Greek political chamber

The Executive of 1822 (Greek: Εκτελεστικό του 1822) was one of the two chambers that were set up in the First National Assembly at Epidaurus. There were five members, and they had to implement the decisions of Legislative Corps. The term of the office was initially set to one year. The Executive's tenure lasted from 15 January 1822 to 26 April 1823 (O.S.), when the Second National Assembly at Astros elected a new Executive.

The Executive's members, as elected by the First National Assembly, were:

- Alexandros Mavrokordatos, President of the Executive
- Athanasios Kanakaris, died in January 1823
- Ioannis Orlandos
- Anagnostis Deligiannis
- Ioannis Logothetis

== Ministers ==
Office	Incumbent	Dates
President of the Executive	Alexandros Mavrokordatos	13 January 1822–10 May 1823
President of the Council of Ministers	Theodoros Negris	16 January 1822–10 May 1823
First Secretary of State	Theodoros Negris	16 January 1822–10 May 1823
Minister of Foreign Affairs	Theodoros Negris	16 January 1822–10 May 1823
Minister of the Interior	Ioannis Kolettis	16 January 1822–10 May 1823
Minister of Economy	Panoutsos Notaras	16 January 1822–10 May 1823
Minister of War	Notis Botsaris	16 January 1822–10 May 1823
Minister of Naval Affairs	Τhree-member Committee from Hydra, Spetses and Psara	16 January 1822–10 May 1823
Minister of Law	Theodoros Vlasios	16 January 1822–10 May 1823
Minister of Religious Affairs	Bishop Iosif of Androusa	16 January 1822–10 May 1823
Minister of Police	Lambros Nakos	16 January 1822–10 May 1823

In February 1822 the three-member Committee for the Ministry of Naval Affairs was appointed:

- N. Panteli Nikolakis
- Andreas Chatzianargyrou
- Ioannis Nikolaou Lazarou

In June 1822, Fransesco Voulgaris replaced N. Panteli Nikolakis.
