= Sotiris Charalampis =

Greek Fighter and Politician

Sotiris Charalampis (Greek: Σωτήρης Χαραλάμπης) was a fighter and politician from Achaea who participated in the Greek Revolution.

== Biography ==
He was an important power broker in the Peloponnese before the Revolution and was the son of Anastasios Charalampis. He was born in about 1770 in Zarouchla, Achaea, he married Victoria Sisini, sister of Georgios Sisinis, and lived in the province of Kalavryta. When the Revolution, of which he was an organiser, started, he was elected general of the local captains by the people of Kalavryta. He had been initiated in the Filiki Eteria. He fought in Saravali, in Pournarokastro and in the siege of Patras with a military force which he himself provided for.

He was elected in the Peloponnesian Senate in 1821 and took part as deputy of the province of Kalavryta in the First National Assembly at Epidaurus and the Second National Assembly at Astros. After the First Assembly he was part of the Vouleftiko ("Legislative [body]") in 1822 and after the Second Assembly, he was elected vice president in the Ektelestiko ("Executive [body]"). He died in 1826 in Nafplio.

== Sources ==
- Fotios Chrisanthopoulos, ed. (1888). Lives of Peloponnesian men, and of the clerics, military men and politicians who came to the Peloponnese, who fought in the revolutionary struggle. Athens: Stavros Andropoulos, Printing house P. D. Sakellarios.
- Athanasios T. Fotopoulos, The Kodjabashis of the Peloponnese during the Second Turcocracy (1715-1821), Doctoral Thesis, National and Kapodistrian University of Athens, Athens, 1995.
