= Liolios Xirolivaditis =

Greek army officer (1783–1860)

- Georgios Xirolivaditis
- Born: 1783; Xirolivado, Imathia
- Died: December 29, 1860 (aged 76–77); Messolonghi
- Spouse: Despo Lioliou
- Children: 1
- Military career
- Allegiance: Greece
- Rank: Lieutenant colonel
- Unit: Greek army
- Conflicts: Greek War of Independence

George Liolios Xirolivaditis or Xerolivadiotis (in his signature he used the form of Liolios Xerolivadiotis or Liolios Elimpios=Olympios) was a Greek armatolos and fighter of the Greek Revolution in 1821 who lived from the late 18th century until the mid of the 19th century.

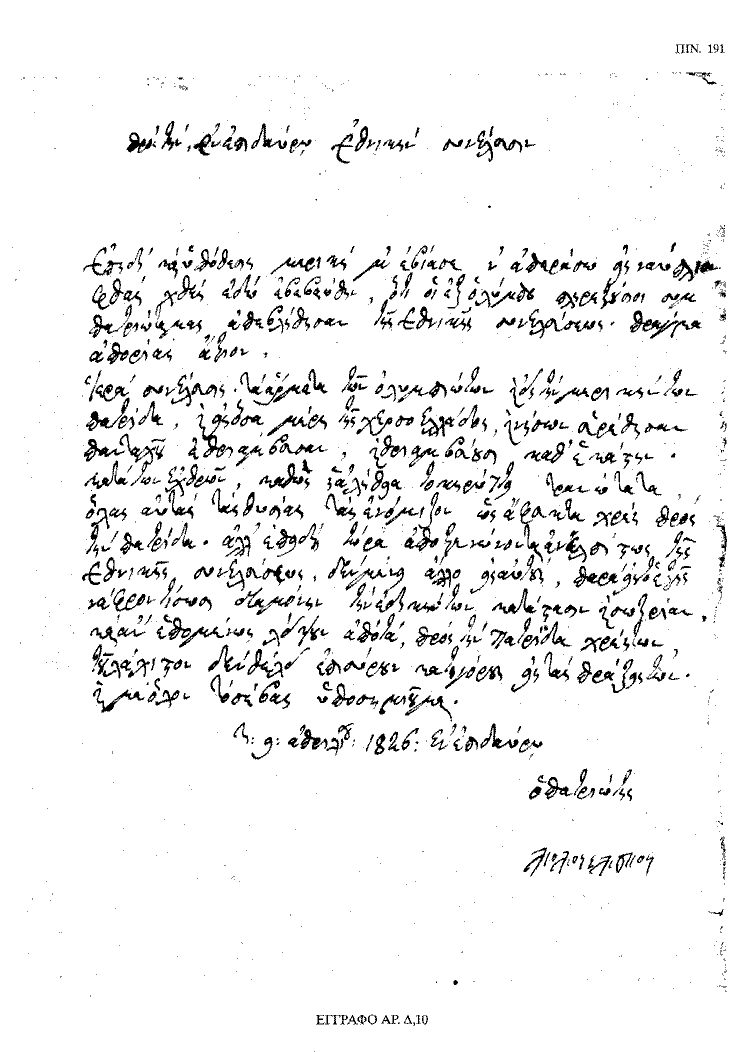
Liolios Xirolivadiotis(Elimpios) Complaint to the third National Assembly

== Early life ==
George (Liolios) Xiroleivaditis or Xiroleivadiotis was born in 1783 in Xirolivado, a village on Mt. Vermio, southwest of the town Veria. From a very young age (15 years old) he joined various groups of klephts and armatoloi, following a military career since then.

He was married to Markos Botsaris' sister, Despo. His son was Spyridon Liolios who was born on October 10, 1817, in Souli. Τhe first years after the revolution, his family moved to Corfu and then to Zakynthos. He died in 1860 at the age of 78 in Messolonghi.

== Career ==
According to his autobiographical note, his military action began in 1798. He joined groups of klephts in Macedonia, Thessaly and Epirus. From 1800 onwards, he participated in the groups of Vlachavas and fought mainly against Ali Pasha. After 1807, he took part in the operations of the Macedonian Armatoloi based on Skiathos island. He finally came to terms with Ali Pasha, by whom he was appointed armatolos in the region of Veria and Edessa and he collaborated with A. Karatasos. Even so, he fought one more time against Ali Pasha, when a new war broke out between Ali and the Souliotes in 1820 into which he supported Markos Botsaris who was his brother-in-law. Along with the rest of the Souliotes, he settled in Souli and resisted against the attacks of the sultan forces as a leader of Kiafa fortress. During the Greek war of independence he spent much of his fortune, maintaining a group of warriors for the needs of the Revolution

He served next to great chiefs such as Souliotes Markos and Kostas Botsaris, his compatriot Anastasios Karatasos, Kolokotronis, Ypsilantis, Kyriakos Mavromichalis. He defended the Mills of Lerna in 1825 under the leadership of Dimitrios Ypsilantis and Kyriakos Mavromichalis, fighting against Ibrahim Pasha of Egypt. He followed Ypsilantis and Mavromichalis in various other operations in the Peloponnese. Then he served under Kolokotronis. In Western Greece, he collaborated with Christoforos Perraivos, while under the directions of Kostas Botsaris he arrived at Dervenakia in Apokouros. In addition, in 1826, as a commander of 150 men, he collaborated with Anastasios Karatasos, and he took part in the operations in the area of Atalanta against Mustabey. In 1827 under Adam Doukas, he moved to Trikeri. In fact, he built a ship at his own expense and participated in pirate operations at the coast of Asia Minor against the Turks. However, later, during the administration of Kapodistrias, he was forced to hand his ship over to Miaoulis, without receiving the compensation promised to him by the Greek Government. In 1829, as a pentacosiarch of the seventh Chiliarchy, he took part in the guarding of the Thermopylae passage.

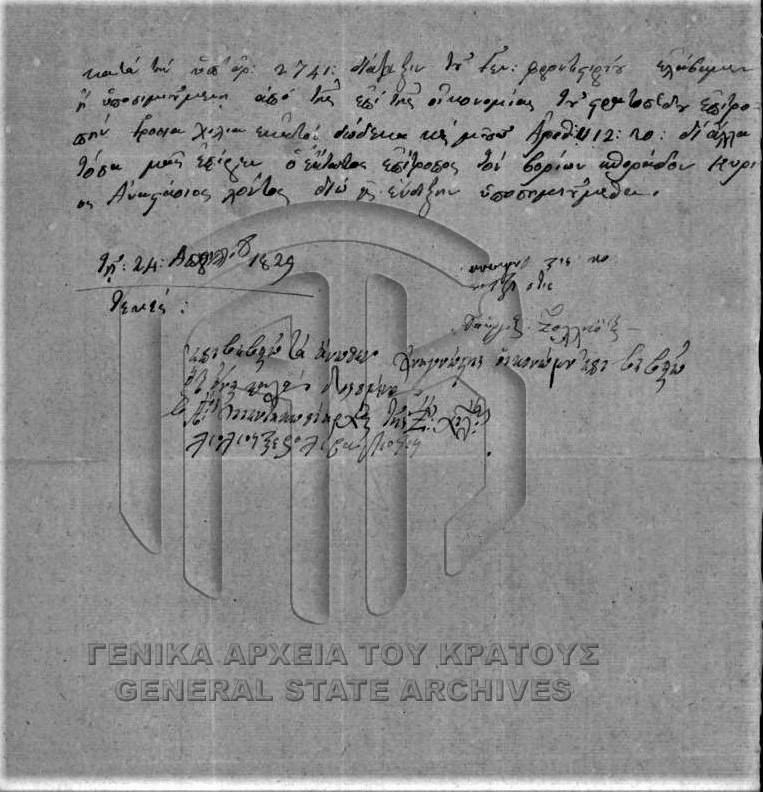
Handwritten receipt signed by Liolios Xirolivaditis, pentacosiarch of the seventh Chiliarchy in 1829

Apart from biographical resources, many archival records have recently been made known about his life. For instance, in September 1823, Liolios was on Hydra island and from there he went to Salamina at the suggestion of Alexandros Mavrokordatos. Anastasios Londos made sure that Liolios’ demands were met, but not the conferment of offices: "I have finished all the cases of Liolios, apart from the offices that George has requested". In April 1826, he corresponded with the administration regarding the movements of himself and his secretary, while he appeared in Epidaurus during the works of the third National Assembly and submitted a handwritten report protesting strongly against the non-acceptance of the Macedonian (= Olympian) representatives. In 1828, he was on Salamina island, where his wife, Despo Lioliou, arrived from Poros. His family was badly off. That is why they accepted the financial support of 300 grosis from the Government. In 1829, while holding the position of high officer, he signed a receipt for 1112 grosis, received from Anastasios Lontos, temporary commissioner of Northern Sporades. After the enthronement of Otto the first he joined the Royal Phalanx where he reached the office of lieutenant colonel.

== Epilogue ==
Georgios Kremos emphasizes Liolios’ honesty, selflessness and patriotism, since he spent all his property on the Greek Cause and "Died destitute like all true fighters". Georgios Gazis describes Liolios as an honest, conscientious and very religious person, especially at the end of his life. Finally, I. Petrov describes him as a tireless fighter, devoted to the national duty and selfless benefactor of the Greek nation.

== Bibliography ==
- Archeia tēs hellēnikēs palingenesias vol.18, Athens 2000.
- Arsenis, Ioannis Ποικίλη Στοά: Εθνική εικονογραφημένη επετηρίς, Επί του Τυπογραφείου Αττικού Μουσείου, Αθήνα, 1884[Poikile Stoa. National Illustrated Yearbook]
- Gazis, Georgios, Λεξικόν της Επαναστάσεως και άλλα έργα, Ιωάννινα 1971.
- Hionidis, Georgios, Λιόλιος Ξερολιβαδιώτης : ένας αγνοημένος Μακεδόνας αγωνιστής του '21 και λίγα για την ιστορία του, Έκδοση του Τουριστικού Ομίλου Ξερολιβάδου, Θεσσαλονίκη, 1977.
- Kasomoulis, Nikolaos, Ενθυμήματα στρατιωτικά της Επαναστάσεως των Ελλήνων 1821-1833 (επιμ. Ι. Βλαχογιάννης), τ.3, Αθήνα 1942.
- Kremos, Georgios, "Speech about G. Liolios Xirolivaditis (Summary)", Parnassos 8, p. 191
- Monuments of Greek History, vol.5. Historical Archive of Alexandros Mavrokordatos, III, (Emm. Protopsaltis, ed.), Athens 1968. [Μνημεία της Ελληνικής Ιστορίας, τ. 5^{ος}, Ιστορικόν Αρχείον Αλεξάνδρου Μαυροκορδάτου, τ.ΙΙΙ, επιμ. Εμμ. Πρωτοψάλτης, Αθήνα 1968].
- Vacalopoulos, Apostolos, History of Macedonia 1354–1833, transl. P.Magann, Institute of Balkan Studies, Thessaloniki 1973
