= Londos family =

Military family from Greece

The Londos family (Greek: Οικογένεια Λόντου) was a military family from Vostitsa (modern Aigio), which flourished during the last century of Ottoman rule in Greece, through the Greek War of Independence. They declined in prominence beginning in the 1840s.

The family was part of the wider Londos clan, whose other main branch was at Patras.

Its members were connected by family ties with the families: Charalambi, Straight, Maximou, Geroulanou, Kalliga, etc.

== Origins ==
In 1715, Golfinos Londos, the progenitor of this branch of the Londos family, settled permanently in Vostitsa, coming from Kalanos Nezeron where he was born. There he began to purchase estates and engage in trade, which brought him enormous profits. Within a few years, Golfinos gained great influence among the kodjabashis and was eventually recognized as the ruler of the region.

== Zenith ==
The Londos family of Vostitsa was actively involved in the Orlov revolt movement of 1770, but managed to escape the wrath of the Turks. From the testimonies of the time it seems that members of the family maintained friendly relations with the Turks. In 1778, Sotirakis Londos was appointed general commissioner of the Peloponnese. The family's influence grew even more a few years later, when Sotirakis Londos occupied the office of mora ayan (first tier of the kodjabashis).

After that point, the primates of Peloponnese were divided into two factions. The first was the Achaean, headed by the Londos family and supported by the prefects of Vostitsa, Patras, Elis, and the second was that of Karytaina. Finally the primates of Karytaina succeeded in beheading Sotirakis Londos. Taking advantage of this blow against the Londos family, Ioannis Deligiannis-Papagiannopoulos established a illegitimate branch of his own house in the area of Nezerohoria within the Londos lands, who come from Kalanos Nezeron, thus aiming on the one hand at the constant friction of his main competitors with the relatives and allies of Papagiannopoulos, who they settled with a focus on the neighboring Kalanistra, and on the one hand in the general neutralization of any hostile influence in the area north of Gortynia.

During the Greek War of Independence in 1821 the Londos family gave their best. Its members had prepared for the impending rebellion since they had already been initiated into the Filiki Eteria since 1818. With the beginning of the revolution, he formed a corps of 700 soldiers and took part in the battles of Patras and Missolonghi, while he also played an important role in the civil war.

After the end of the revolution, many members of the Londos family held important positions such as prime ministers, ministers, senators, presidents of the Parliament, parliamentarians, generals, admirals, mayors, etc. Its most active member was Andreas S. Londos.

== Decline ==
From 1840 the most important representative of the family, Andreas, began to face great financial difficulties. At first he borrowed money from his brothers, Loukas and Anastasios, but later his brothers, unable to continue lending to him, began to confiscate his estates. In particular, his brother Anastasios confiscated a large part of his real estate property, causing his financial problem to swell.

With the resignation of the Mavrokordatos Government, of which he was a minister, Andreas Londos was marginalized even more, while he was prosecuted by Ioannis Kolettis. Finally, on 24 September 1845, unable to bear his failure, he committed suicide with a gun at his home in Athens. His body was taken to Aigio and specifically to the house of his brother Loukas on 15 October, but he was not buried with a church ritual due to the ban imposed by the Kolettis Government.

His funeral was finally held in September 1847, immediately after the death of Ioannis Kolettis. At the same time, since the death of Andreas, even though the members of the Londos family continued to be elected deputies of Vostitsa, the substantial influence of the family on the political events of the place stopped. The formal end came a few years later with the death of the last brother of the family, Loukas Londos.

== Members ==
- Golfinos Londos, primate & progenitor of the Londos family in Vostitsa

- Sotirakis Londos, primate, mora ayan and son of Golfinos

- Loukas Londos, Member of Parliament for Vostitsa and son of Sotirakis

- Konstantinos Londos, son of Loukas

- Anastasios Londos, rear admiral and son of Constantine

- Anastasios Londos, mayor of Aigio, member of parliament, minister and son of Sotirakis
- Andreas Londos, primate, chieftain, member of parliament, minister and son of Sotirakis
- Maria Londou, wife of Leon Messinezis and daughter of Sotirakis

- Miltiadis Messinezis, raisin merchant and son of Maria

- Aristotle Messinezis, raisin merchant and son of Miltiadis
- Ioannis Messinezis, son of Miltiadis
- Georgios Messenezis, merchant, consul of London and son of Miltiadis

- Miltiadis Messinezis, wife of Konstantinos Michalopoulos and daughter of Georgios

- Leon M. Messinezis, merchant, member of parliament, husband of Susana Stavropoulou and son of Miltiadis

- Miltiadis Messinezis, merchant and son of Leo

- Zoi Messinezi, wife of Stylianos Andreas Kontogouris and daughter of Maria

- Aristomenis Kontogouris, mayor of Patras, member of parliament, minister, husband of Victoria Chrysanthou Sisini and son of Zoe

- Nikolaos A. Kontogouris, army officer, member of parliament and son of Aristomenis
- Filippos Kontogouris, diplomat and son of Aristomenis

- Ioannis Messinezis, president of the Parliament & Council of State, MP, husband of Maria Doumas and son of Maria

- Leo Messenezis, governor and son of John
- Maria Messinezi, wife of Konstantinos Sorriadis and daughter of Ioannis

- Teti Sotiriadis, wife of Kostas Iliaskos and daughter of Maria

- Sotirios Messinezis, landowner, mayor of Aigio, husband of Hyakinthi Georgiou Sisini and son of Maria

- Georgios Messinezis, lawyer and son of Sotiris
- Lykourgos Messinezis, husband of Kallisti Andrea Notara and son of Sotiris

- Sotiris Messinezis, lawyer and son of Lykourgos

- Filippos Messinezis, diplomat and son of Sotiris

- Yakinthi Messinezi, wife of Petros Margaritis and daughter of Lykourgos

- Loris Margaritis, composer, pianist and son of Yakinthi

- Messinezis, son of Lykourgos

- Nysis Messinezis-Metaxas, employee of the National Bank, historian and son of Messinezis
