= Panoutsos Notaras =

Leading figure of the Greek War of Independence (1740/1752–1849)

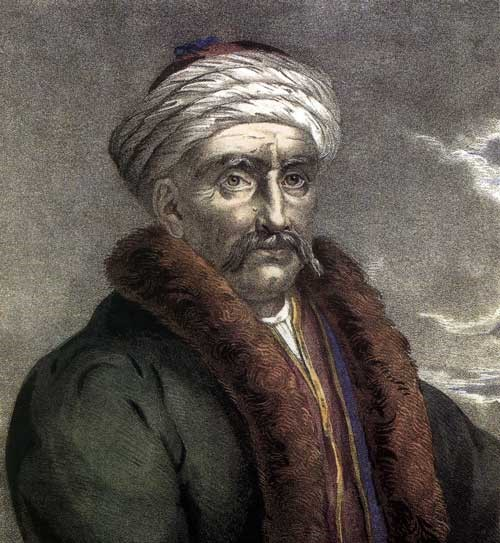
Notaras painted by Adam Friedel.

Panoutsos Notaras (Greek: Πανούτσος Νοταράς; 31 March 1740 or 1752 – 18 January 1849) was a Greek revolutionary and politician who was a leading figure of the Greek War of Independence, serving several times as president of the Greek national assemblies and legislative bodies.

== Early life ==
Panoutsos Notaras was born in Trikala, Corinthia on 31 March, either in 1740, or, more probably, in 1752. His family, the Notarades, were among the six most prominent Greek Orthodox families of the Peloponnese during the late Ottoman rule, and occupied high-ranking offices in the provincial administration. Panoutsos' father, Spyridon Notaras, was considered one of the best-educated Greek magnates. Panoutsos himself received a good education by the scholar Grigorios Karvounis, although his feeble health did not allow him to go for university studies to Italy.

== Greek War of Independence ==
Panoutsos Notaras participated in the unsuccessful Orlov Revolt in 1770, and in 1818 became a member of the Filiki Etaireia, a secret society preparing for another Greek uprising against the Ottoman Empire. He considered the start of the Greek War of Independence in March 1821 as too premature, and fell out with the Etaireia's envoy, Papaflessas, over the issue. Nevertheless, after the uprising had progressed, and following the execution of his brother Andrikos by the Ottomans in April and the arrival of Dimitrios Ypsilantis in the Peloponnese in June, he came around to supporting it. He was elected as a representative to the First National Assembly at Epidaurus in late 1821, and participated in the 12-member committee that drafted the Greek Constitution of 1822. In the first Executive of the Provisional Government, serving from January 1822 to April 1823, he was Minister of Economy. From 11 October 1824 until 6 April 1826, Notaras served as President of the Legislative Corps, although the body was largely sidelined by the Executive at the time. In the Greek civil wars of 1824–1825, he sided with the "government" faction although he initially sympathized with the "military" faction around Theodoros Kolokotronis. Nevertheless, as President of the Legislative he tried unsuccessfully to mediate between the two sides, and urged the government to show leniency and pardon their opponents.

Notaras served briefly (6–16 April 1826) as President of the Third National Assembly, but its sessions were suspended at the news of the fall of Missolonghi. He remained head of a provisional committee representing the Assembly to the Executive, and on 16 March 1827 issued the order reconvening the Assembly at Troezen. Due to his involvement in a scandal in support for his nephew Ioannis Notaras, he was dismissed from his post before the Assembly reconvened, and retired from public life for two years. Under the new Governor of Greece, Ioannis Kapodistrias, Notaras became a member of the Panellinion, an advisory body created instead of a parliament, but was not very active there. On 27 November 1829, Kapodistrias appointed Notaras as president of the Court of Appeals in Nafplion.

Notaras took part in the Fifth National Assembly at Nafplion, where, following the resignation of Ioannis Kapodistrias' brother and successor, Augustinos, he supported Ioannis Kolettis. He was elected President of the Assembly on 11 June 1832, and chaired it until it broke up on 20 August. His brief tenure was dominated by the acceptance of the Bavarian prince Otto, who was selected by the three Great Powers (France, Britain, Russia), as King of Greece.

== Later life and death ==
Notaras remained on the sidelines in the first decade of Otto's rule, but following the 3 September 1843 Revolution he was elected President of the new National Assembly, which was tasked with drafting a new constitution. He held the post from 8 November until the Assembly's dissolution on 18 March 1844, but this was largely an honorary appointment for the "Nestor of Greek politicians", since his advanced age precluded any active participation. The actual work was handled by the Assembly's vice-presidents, Andreas Metaxas, Andreas Londos, Alexandros Mavrokordatos and Ioannis Kolettis.

In 1846, Notaras published his autobiography, and retired to his native Trikala, where he died on 18 January 1849. The historic Notarades building is also in the village (at risk of collapse as of 2019).
