= Farmakidis =

Farmakidis is a surname. Notable people with the surname include:

- Theoklitos Farmakidis (1784–1860), Greek cleric and journalist
- Ioannis Farmakidis, Greek wrestler

== See also ==
- Salpigks Elliniki#Dispute between Farmakidis and Ypsilantis - Suspension of Publication
