= Christoforos Zachariadis =

Fighter in the Greek Revolution of 1821

- Occupation: Soldier

Christoforos Zachariadis (Greek: Χριστόφορος Ζαχαριάδης) was a fighter in the Greek Revolution of 1821, and was originally from Kyparissia. He participated in military operations in Moldavia and Wallachia initially and then later in the Peloponnese. He worked with the "Committee of Zakynthos". Politically, he was considered to be a follower of the Anglophile faction.

== Biography ==
Christoforos or Christos Zachariadis was born in Kyparissia but was raised in Zakynthos. Later he moved to Odessa where he worked as a secretary in a commercial store. There, in 1820, he was initiated into the Filiki Eteria, a secret organization whose purpose was to overthrow the Ottoman rule of Greece and establish an independent Greek state. When the Revolution in the Danubian Principalities broke out, he was one of the founders of the Sacred Band in Focşani and then he served as an adjutant to the captain Giannakis Kolokotronis.

On 27 May he took part in the battle against the Ottoman cavalry at the Notseti monastery. After the suppression of the revolution in the Danubian Principalities, he fled to the Peloponnese, along with Giannakis and Apostolis Kolokotronis, Ioannis Petas and other fighters. He arrived in the Peloponnese in August 1821 and took part in the Battle of the Trench, the Siege of Tripolitsa and later in the battles during the Siege of Patras.

In 1825 he was the bearer of the note of the "Zakynthos Commission", which was signed by Theodoros Kolokotronis, Andreas Zaimis, Andreas Miaoulis, Kanellos Deligiannis, and others, in which they asked for English protection of the nascent Greek state. During the same period he was a representative of the "Zakynthos Commission" in the Greek provisional capital, Nafplio. In fact, in September 1825, in a letter to the committee he chastised the political infighting between various factions in the capital. During the Third Siege of Missolonghi he acted as a spy in the Egyptian camp and managed to obtain important information, which he later communicated to the besieged.

== Bibliography ==
- Fotios Chrysanthopoulos (1888). Βίοι Πελοποννησίων ανδρών και των εξώθεν εις την Πελοπόννησον ελθόντων κληρικών, στρατιωτικών και πολιτικών των αγωνισαμένων τον αγώνα της επαναστάσεως. Athens: Σταύρος Ανδρόπουλος, Τυπογραφείο Π. Δ. Σακελλαρίου.
- Dionysios Kokkinos, Η Ελληνική Επανάστασις, εκδόσεις Μέλισσα, 6th Edition, Athens, 1974.
- Apostolos E. Vakalopoulos, Ιστορία του Νέου Ελληνισμού, Vol. VII, Thessaoniki, 1982.
