= Kolokotronis =

Kolokotronis (Greek: Κολοκοτρώνης) is a Greek surname. When used without any additional context, it refers to the Greek warlord Theodoros Kolokotronis, whose contribution to the Greek revolution of 1821 against the Ottoman Empire was determining for Greece to regain its freedom and become an independent country after four hundred years of Ottoman subjugation.

When used within a greater context, it may refer to the following notable people:

- Apostolis Kolokotronis, Greek military officer
- Gennaios Kolokotronis (1805–1868), Greek general
- Konstantinos Kolokotronis, Greek revolutionary
- Matina Kolokotronis (born 1964), American basketball executive
- Panos Kolokotronis, Greek military officer
- Theodoros Kolokotronis (1770–1843), Greek general, son of Konstantinos, father of Gennaios and Panos
  - Theodoros Kolokotronis Stadium in Tripoli, Greece
