= George Jarvis (Philhellene) =

First of American Philhellenes who took part in the Greek Revolution

George Jarvis (1797–1828) was the first American Philhellene, who took part in the Greek Revolution.

== Biography ==
George Jarvis, born in Altona (today a western borough of Hamburg) was the son of Benjamin Jarvis, an American diplomat on assignment in Europe. While Jarvis was a student in a German university, he was fired by enthusiasm for the Greek Revolution. Jarvis sailed for Greece with Frank Abney Hastings, a Royal Navy officer, arriving on the island of Hydra on April 3.

Jarvis serving as an officer in the Greek Navy from 1822 to 1824 with Manolis Tobazis, a captain and shipowner from Hydra.

Jarvis was a true philhellene who endangered his life to come to the aid of Greece and her people. Upon his arrival in Greece in 1822 he put the "fustanella" (uniform of the Greek fighter), he taught himself to read and write Greek and thereafter Greek fighters call him Captain "George Zervas or Zervos, the American".

After Lord Byron's arrival in Greece, Jarvis left Hydra for the town of Missolonghi, in western Central Greece, and served as Lord Byron's adjutant until his death on April 18, 1824. Under guidance of Greek engineer M. Kokkinis he also helped fortify both Missolonghi and the island of Aitoliko. In August 1824 under Alexandros Mavrokordatos's leadership, he took part in the expedition to the northern Turkish strongholds of Kravassaras (Amfilochia) and Makrynoros, in the province of Epirus.

During the invasion of the Morea by Ibrahim Pasha of Egypt, he assumed the expenses for the 45 soldiers sent to Methoni. From 1827 until his death on August 11, 1828, Jarvis along with Samuel Gridley Howe and Jonathan Peckham Miller, as members of the philhellenic committee of America, continued to contribute by distributing much needed medication, clothing and food to Greek population who had suffered during this time. George Jarvis died on August 11, 1828, most probably from tetanus or typhus. He was buried within the premises of Agios Ioannis church in the city of Argos, with the rank of lieutenant general.
