= Petrakis =

Petrakis (Greek: Πετράκης), feminine Petraki (Greek: Πετράκη) is a Greek surname. Notable people include:

- Dionysios Petrakis, Greek monk and politician
- Georgios Petrakis (1890–1972), Greek resistance fighter and politician
- Giannis Petrakis (born 1959), Greek football manager
- Giorgos Petrakis (born 1988), Greek football manager
- Harry Mark Petrakis (1923–2021), American writer
- Maria Petraki (born 1962), Greek chess player
- Stefanos Petrakis (1924–2022), Greek sprinter
- Stylianos Petrakis, Greek naval officer
- Vangelis Petrakis (1938–2026), Greek footballer

== See also ==
- John Petrakis Park, baseball venue in Dubuque, Iowa, United States
- Petraki Monastery, monastery in Athens
