= Anastasios Londos =

Greek politician (c. 1791 – 1856)

- Ἀναστάσιος Λόντος
- Born: c. 1791; Aigio, Achaea, Ottoman Empire
- Died: 1856; Greece
- Occupation: Politician
- Years active: 1823–1856
- Father: Sotirakis Londos
- Relatives: Maria Messinezi [d] (sister); Andreas Londos (brother); Loukas Londos [d] (brother)

Mayor of Aigio
- In office 1835–1837

Member of parliament for Aigialeia
- In office 1850–1853

Senator of Greece
- In office 1853–1856

Greek Minister of Justice
- In office 1854–1855

Greek Minister of Foreign Affairs
- In office 1855–1856

Anastasios Londos (Greek: Ἀναστάσιος Λόντος; c. 1791 – 1856) was a Greek politician, mayor of Aigio and senator of the Kingdom of Greece.

== Early life ==
He was born in Aigio in about 1791 and was the child of a powerful family of nobles. He was sent to Pisa to study medicine but with the outbreak of the revolution of 1821 he returned to Greece, as a result of which he interrupted his studies.

== Political career ==
He was elected representative of the province of Vostitsa in the Astros National Assembly in 1823 and took part in totally three of the Greek National Assemblies (1823, 1826 and 1843). During the period of the government of Kapodistrias he served as extraordinary commissioner of the Northern Sporades but eventually joined the anti-government opposition forces. In 1835 he was appointed mayor of Aigio, he held this position until 1837. In 1850 he was elected member of parliament for Aigialeia and in 1853 he was elected senator. In 1854–1855 he served as Minister of Justice in the government of Mavrokordatos, while in 1855–1856 he took over the Ministry of Foreign Affairs in the government of Dimitrios Voulgaris.

He died in 1856 while serving as a senator of Greece.

== Family ==
He was the brother of Andreas Londos, Loukas Londos and Maria Messinezi. His father Sotirakis Londos was a distinguished Greek politician.

== Sources ==
- "Register of Recipients, Senators and Members of the Parliament 1822–1935" (PDF) (in Greek). Athens: Hellenic Parliament. 1986.
