= Salpigks Elliniki =

- Type: Print newspaper
- Publisher: Theoklitos Farmakidis
- Language: Greek
- Headquarters: Kalamata

The Salpigks Elliniki was the first printed newspaper in Greece. It was published by Theoklitos Farmakidis in Kalamata on August 1, 1821. Only 3 issues were published (August 1, 5, and 20, 1821), which are preserved in the Library of the Hellenic Parliament, donated by Timoleon Filimon.

== History ==
Dimitrios Ypsilantis, coming from Trieste to Greece as an envoy of the “National Representative,” that is, Alexandros Ypsilantis, brought with him a small printing press. In his effort to find a printer, he contacted Iakovos Tombazis, who introduced him to Konstantinos Tompras, who had learned the printing trade in Paris. Tompras agreed to operate the printing press, and it was decided to set it up inside a Turkish mosque in liberated Kalamata as the "National Printing House". The first issue of Salpigks Elliniki was printed there on August 1, 1821.

== Publisher ==
The publication was entrusted to the scholar Theoklitos Farmakidis, who was appointed as “supervisor and publisher” of the newspaper Salpigks Elliniki. Theoklitos Farmakidis was an experienced journalist, having also participated in the publication of the magazine Hermes the Scholar in Vienna.

== Publication ==
The initial plan, when Salpigks was first published, was to be released every other day. The price was set at 50 grosia per year. However, they ultimately managed to publish only three issues, on August 1, 5, and 20, 1821. The newspaper was published in 4-page, two-column format. The first issue even had a cover.

== Content ==
In the three issues of Salpigks, material was published that exclusively concerned the Greek Revolution. In the first two issues, the well-known revolutionary proclamation of Alexandros Ypsilantis was published. The third issue contained an appeal from the Messinians to the European governments, regarding the liberation struggle being waged by Greece.

== Dispute between Farmakidis and Ypsilantis - Suspension of Publication ==
Dimitrios Ypsilantis believed that Salpigks Elliniki should serve exclusively the interests of the Struggle and that he should control and direct its content to satisfy the military and political necessities of the time. Theoklitos Farmakidis, supporting the principle of freedom of the press, reacted to Ypsilantis's attempt to impose censorship on the newspaper. Thus, Farmakidis refused to continue the publication, and this commendable effort did not come to fruition.

== Criticism ==
It was considered that Salpigks Elliniki, like some other Greek newspapers of the time, published distorted or exaggerated information to excite the Greeks. This made objective reporting and forming a correct understanding of military developments difficult, especially in the early years of the Greek Revolution of 1821.
