= Panagiotis Karatzas =

Greek revolutionary leader

- Born: Patras, Ottoman Greece (now Greece)
- Died: 1824; Oblou Monastery, Achaia, Greece
- Occupation: Greek revolutionary leader

Panagiotis Karatzas (Greek: Παναγιώτης Καρατζάς; 18th century – 1824) was a Greek revolutionary leader in Patras during the Greek Revolution of 1821. During his childhood he showed his bravery and defiance against the Ottoman Empire, often fighting with Turkish peers. He fled to the Ionian Islands, then under British rule, he moved to Zakynthos, and enrolled into the British Army in the 3rd Greek Legion. He returned to Patras in 1809.

He was one of the main commanders during the siege of Patras (1821). He was against the Ottoman-era local kodjabashis of the area. He was murdered by Greek rivals in 1824.
