= Messenian Senate =

First government of the Greek Revolution

Messenian Senate Μεσσηνιακή Σύγκλητος
- 1821–1821
- Status: Regional government in revolt against the Ottoman Empire
- Capital: Kalamata
- Common languages: Greek
- Religion: Greek Orthodox
- Government: Republic
  - 1821: Petrobey Mavromichalis
- Historical era: Greek War of Independence
  - Established: 25 March 1821
  - Disestablished: 25 May 1821
Preceded by	Succeeded by
Morea Eyalet	Peloponnesian Senate

The Messenian Senate (Greek: Μεσσηνιακή Σύγκλητος) was the first government of the Greek Revolution. It was the first move towards the creation of the Peloponnesian Senate.

== History ==
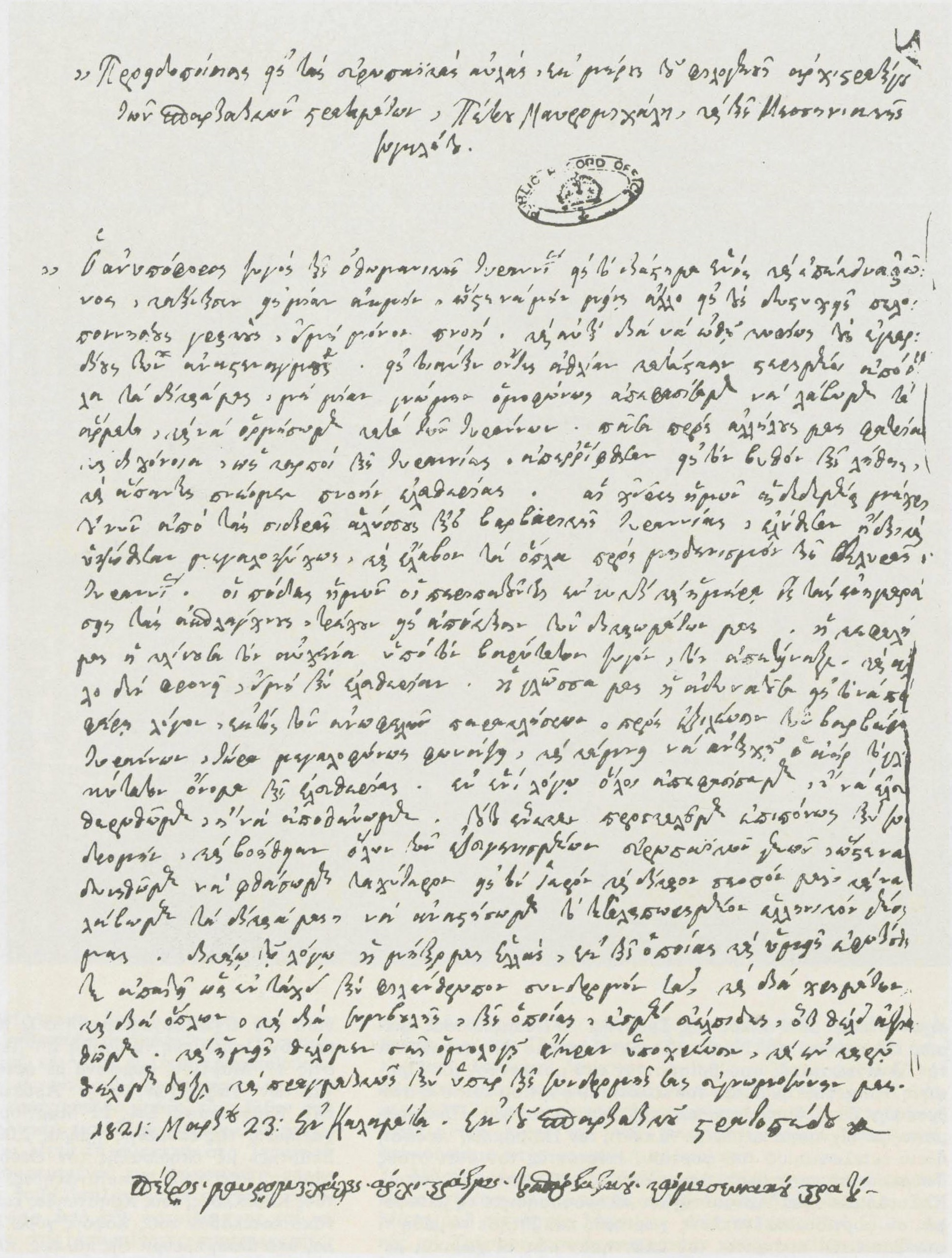
The Manifesto Addressed to Europe of 1821

The Messenian Senate was formed at Kalamata on 25 March (O.S.) 1821. During its inaugural session, it elected Petrobey Mavromichalis as its president.

Three days later the Senate issued a Manifesto Addressed to Europe, “the first formal briefing (“warning”, as the manifesto was characterised by its writers) of the European governments and European public opinion about the declaration of war to Turkey by the Greeks”. In the following months, the Manifesto (probably written by Adamantios Korais) was delivered to the European consulates in Patras and appeared in Italian, French, English, German and American newspapers. The Messenian Senate was dissolved after the formation of the Peloponnesian Senate.

== The Manifesto Addressed to Europe ==
The text of the Manifesto:

Manifesto addressed to Europe by Petros Mavromichalis, Commander-In-Chief of the Spartan Troops, and the Messenian Senate, sitting at Kalamata.

The insupportable yoke of Ottoman tyranny hath weighed down for above a century the unhappy Greeks of the Peloponnesus. So excessive had its rigour become, that its fainting victims had scarcely strength enough to utter groans. In this state, deprived of all our rights, we have unanimously resolved to take up arms against our tyrants. All our intestine discord is plunged into oblivion as a fruit of oppression, and we breathe the air of liberty. Our bands having burst their fetters, already signalize themselves against the barbarians. We no longer run about day and night to execute corvées imposed by a merciless taskmaster. Our mouths are opened; heretofore silent, or employed only in addressing useless supplications to our tormentors, they now celebrate a deliverance which we have sworn to accomplish, or else to perish. We invoke therefore the aid of all civilized nations of Europe, that we may the more promptly attain to the goal of a just and sacred enterprise, reconquer our rights, and regenerate our unfortunate people. Greece, our mother, was the lamp that illuminated you; on this ground she reckons on your philanthropy. Arms, money, and counsel, are what she expects from you. We promise you her lively gratitude, which she will prove by deeds in more prosperous times.

(Signed) PETROS MAVROMICHALIS

Given at the head-quarters of Kalamata, March 28/April 9, 1821.
