= Oblou Monastery =

Monastery in Achaia, Greece

- Μονή Ομπλού

Monastery information
- Established: 1189
- Dedicated to: Presentation of Theotokos
- Celebration date: November 21
- Diocese: Metropolis of Patras

Site
- Location: Krini, Patras, Achaia
- Country: Greece
- Coordinates: 38°10′22″N 21°46′26″E

The Oblou Monastery (Greek: Μονή Ομπλού) is located in Achaia and is built on the mountain that is today called Oblos. It is one of the most historic Monasteries of modern Greece, which appears involved in every important historical moment.

During the time of the Turkish occupation, the Monastery was an important attraction for many monks of the region, it actively participated and was destroyed for its participation during the liberation struggles.

The Oblou Monastery was built in 1189 and took its name from the small church that existed on the site before its construction.

The Monastery has an area of approximately 1800 sq.m. and its katholikon is dedicated to the Presentation of Theotokos. On the site of the Monastery, there is also an internal chapel in honor of Agios Charalambos. Today, according to the national census of 2011, it counts only 6 monks.

== Historical evidence ==
The Monastery has been destroyed by all the conquerors that passed through the area (Venetians, Turks, Germans) and has contributed significantly to all the revolutions and liberation struggles of the Greek Nation. After the "Orlov" of 1770, the hordes of Albanians brought by the Ottomans to suppress the revolution caused great destruction in the region. They set fire to the Monastery as well as the temples of Saint Andrew and Saint Aikaterini and the Girokomeio Monastery.

The codex of M. Oblou states "1770 in the month of April, the looting and destruction of Old Patras took place with drunkenness and the burning of the monastery, destruction of the cells and the church of the Albanians". A document dated May 13, 1770 is also preserved according to which the ağa Suleiman and Mustafa declare that the monks worshiped Mehmet Pasha and no one should disturb them. The metochi that the Monastery in Patras had was also burned by the Albanians and was rebuilt in 1790.

At the beginning of the Revolution of 1821, the Monastery was a supply center for the camp of Patras. In the codex of the Monastery there is a difficult to understand reference to the beginning of the Revolution, where it says that on March 3, 1821, the Moria revolution reached Oblos. Thomopoulos gives the possible interpretation that there was a meeting of those qualified for the Revolution.

Rebels gathered in Oblos on March 21–23 before descending on Patras. On March 23, Asimakis and Dimitrakis Zaimis and others wrote from Kalavryta to the abbot of Agia Lavra not to delay the shipment of food to Oblos because the army is in danger of disbanding. On April 3, 1821, Yusuf Pasha arrived in Patras and dissolved the siege of the fortress by dispersing the camps of A. Zaimis and A. Londos. Around the end of May, Andreas Zaimis strengthened the defense around Oblos and repelled an attack by the Turkalvans under Aslanakis.

In 1581 the Monastery became a Stavropigiac Monastery and in 1896 the Monastery of Agios Konstantinos was incorporated and became a sharer of it.

== Sources ==
- Αποτελέσματα της Απογραφής Πληθυσμού-Κατοικιών 2011 που αφορούν στο Μόνιμο Πληθυσμό της Χώρας, Εφημερίδα της Κυβερνήσεως της Ελληνικής Δημοκρατίας, τχ. 2ο, φ. 3465 (28 Δεκεμβρίου 2012).
- Στέφανου Ν. Θωμόπουλου, Η Ιερά Μονή Ομπλού, Τύποις "Φοίνικος" Ηρακλέους Π. Ευμορφοπούλου, Εν Πάτραις 1903.
- Βασίλης Κ. Λάζαρης (επιμ.), Στέφανου Ν. Θωμόπουλου "Ιστορία της Πόλεως Πατρών από αρχαιοτάτων χρόνων μέχρι του 1821". Έκδοση τέταρτη στη δημοτική γλώσσα και με βάση τα χειρόγραφα του συγγραφέα, Τόμος Β', Αχαϊκές Εκδόσεις, Πάτρα 1999. ISBN 960-7960-09-2. (ιδίως σελ. 405–412)
- Νίκα Πολυχρονοπούλου-Κλαδά, "Η Μονή Ομπλού και επισημάνσεις επί του αρχείου της (1315-1829)" στο Ζ΄ Διεθνές Συνέδριο Πελοποννησιακών Σπουδών, τομ. 3, 2005.
- Αγαμέμνων Τσελίκας, "Τα δικαιοπρακτικά έγγραφα των μοναστηριών Ομπλού, Χρυσοποδαριτίσσης, Αγίων Πάντων και Γηροκομείου Πατρών (1712-1855). Διπλωματική έκδοση" στο Δελτίο του Ιστορικού και Παλαιογραφικού Αρχείου, τόμος Θ', Μ.Ι.Ε.Τ., Αθήνα 2000. ISSN 1108-6068.
- "Μεσσάτιδα", περιοδικό Δήμου Μεσσάτιδος, τεύχος 2
