= Apostolis Kolokotronis =

- Αποστόλης Κολοκοτρώνης
- Born: Arcadia, Greece
- Died: 1862; Tripoli, Greece
- Spouse: Sophia St. Dimitrakopoulou
- Children: Five daughters
- Relatives: Giannakis Kolokotronis (father), Theodoros Kolokotronis (uncle)
- Military career
- Allegiance: Greek War of Independence
- Branch: Greek Army
- Rank: Colonel
- Unit: Royal Phalanx
- Commands: General Leader of the Armed Forces of Tripoli Region
- Conflicts: Moldavia-Wallachia campaign, Battle of the Ditch, Siege of Nafplio, Siege of Acrocorinth, Battles during the Siege of Patras, Repulsion of the invasion of Mahmud Dramali Pasha, Military operations against Ibrahim Pasha, Greek civil wars of 1824–25
- Awards: Commemorative Medal of the War of Independence
- Other work: Officer of the Royal Phalanx

Apostolis Kolokotronis (Greek: Αποστόλης Κολοκοτρώνης) was a chieftain of the Greek War of Independence and an officer of the Greek army from Arcadia. He was member of the well-known Kolokotronis family.

== Biography ==
Kolokotronis was the son of the chieftain Giannakis Kolokotronis (also known by the nickname "Daskoulias") and nephew of the commander Theodoros Kolokotronis. In the first stages of the Greek War of Independence, he took part along with his father in the military operations in Moldavia-Wallachia under the command of prince Alexandros Ypsilantis. After the suppression of the revolution in the Danubian Principalities, father and son returned in early August 1821, along with other fighters to the Peloponnese and participated in the Battle of the Ditch, where Apostolis was injured.

After that he actively participated in the siege of Nafplio, the siege of the Acrocorinth, in the conflicts during the siege of Patras (battles of Chalandritsa, Girokomio, etc.), and in the repulsion of the invasion of Mahmud Dramali Pasha. He was appointed Lieutenant on June 5, 1823, by the Greek government.

During the Greek civil wars of 1824–25, although he was invited by Theodoros Kolokotronis to join him in the blockade of Nafplio and the siege of Tripoli, he adopted a neutral position. Also, in early 1824 he was accused of arbitrariness in Pyrgos area. Later he participated in the military operations against Ibrahim Pasha and he was elected by Theodoros Kolokotronis as general leader of the armed forces of Tripoli region.

After the creation of the independent Greek state, he became in 1836 an officer of the Royal Phalanx and in 1845 he received the rank of colonel and was awarded with the Commemorative Medal of the War of Independence. He died in 1862 in Tripoli. He was married to Sophia St. Dimitrakopoulou from Tripoli with whom he had five daughters.
