= Emmanouil Tombazis =

Greek naval captain (c. 1784–1831)

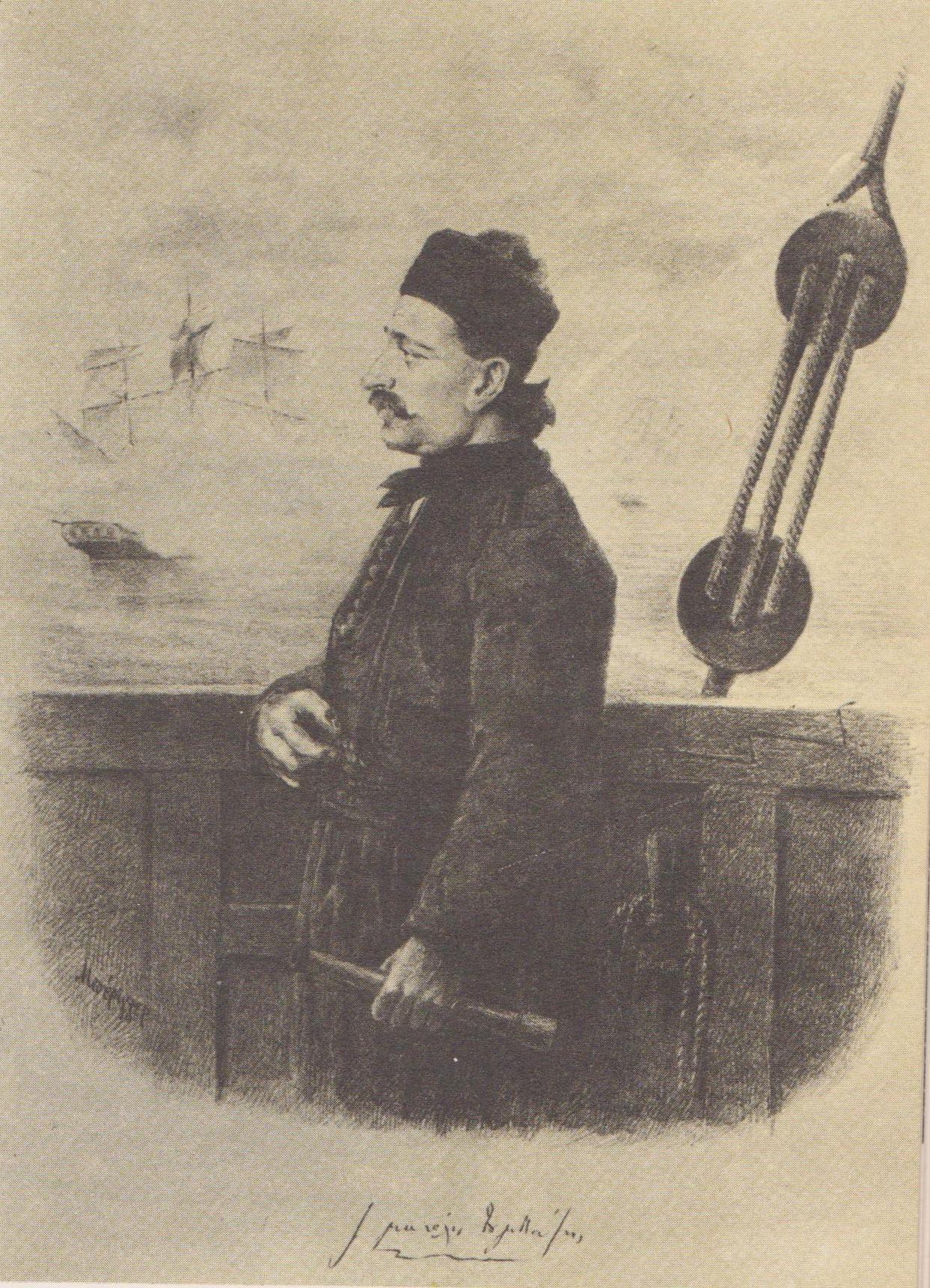
- Emmanouil Tombazis c. 1825 by Boehringer
- Born: c. 1784; Hydra, Ottoman Empire (now Greece)
- Died: 1831 Hydra, First Hellenic Republic
- Allegiance: (Greece) First Hellenic Republic
- Branch: Hellenic Navy
- Rank: Captain
- Conflicts: Greek War of Independence: Greek raid on Alexandria
- Children: Nikolaos Tombazis
- Other work: Representative for Hydra at the First National Assembly at Epidaurus and Second National Assembly at Astros; Commissioner of Crete; Minister for Naval Affairs

Emmanouil Tombazis (Greek: Εμμανουήλ Τομπάζης, c. 1784–1831) was a Greek naval captain from Hydra, active during the Greek War of Independence, who was appointed Commissioner of Crete for the Greek provisional government in 1823–1824 and naval minister for a short period in 1828.

The Tombazis family migrated from Vourla, Smyrna to the island of Hydra in 1668. It was originally named Yakoumakis (Greek: Γιακουμάκης). Emmanouil Tombazis was the son of Nikolaos Tombazis and brother of Iakovos Tombazis. During the early years of the War of Independence, he participated in several naval battles and served as a representative for his native island in the national assemblies of Epidaurus and Astros.

Appointed Commissioner for Crete in early 1823, he arrived on the island on 21 May 1823 at the fort of Kissamos with a small fleet of five warships, three transports and 600, mostly Epirote, volunteers. His arrival gave new impetus and hope to Cretan insurgents, notably since the Ottoman Turks at the fort surrendered shortly after his arrival, on May 25, and this was followed by other victories.

However, Tombazis was criticised for his delay in organising a military force to repel the expected arrival of 12,000 Turkish-Egyptian soldiers under the command of Hussein Bey, a son-in-law of Muhammad Ali of Egypt. When he finally gathered 3,000 insurgents at Gergeri they were no match for the larger and better-trained force at the battle of Amourgelles on 20 August 1823.

In 1828 he was appointed by Governor Ioannis Kapodistrias as Minister for Naval Affairs, but resigned shortly after when he disagreed with his policies.

He died at Hydra in 1831, leaving behind a son, Nikolaos (1815–1896).

== Sources ==
- Detorakis, Theocharis (1988). "Η Τουρκοκρατία στην Κρήτη ("Turkish rule in Crete")". In Panagiotakis, Nikolaos M. (ed.). Crete, History and Civilization (in Greek). Vol. II. Vikelea Library, Association of Regional Associations of Regional Municipalities. pp. 333–436.
