= Fotos Bomporis =

Greek politician

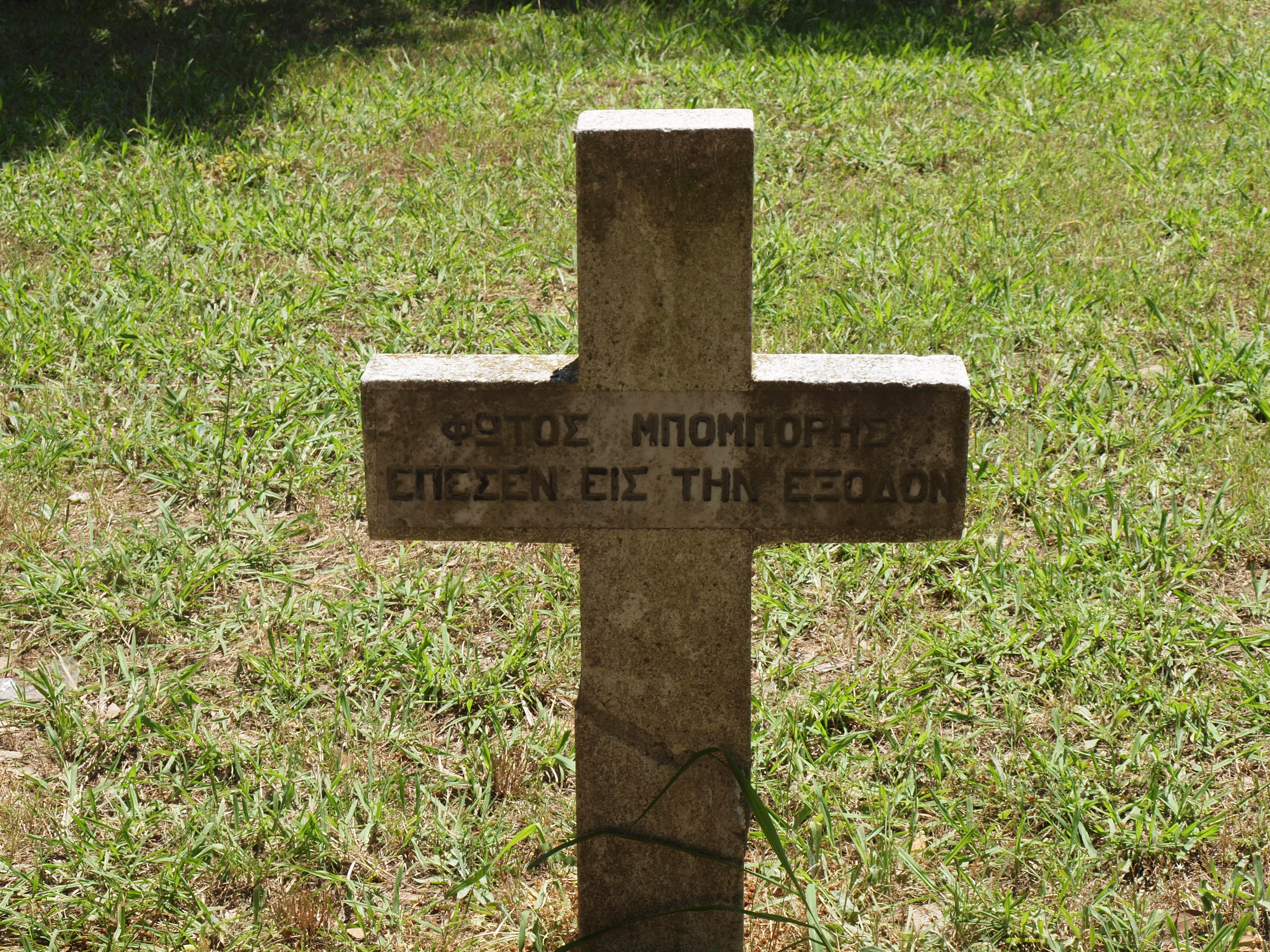
- The grave of Bomporis at Missolonghi
- Native name: Φώτος Μπόμπορης
- Born: Fotios Bomporis; Φώτιος Μπόμπορης
- Died: 28 February 1826 Missolonghi, Sanjak of Karli-Eli, Ottoman Empire (now Greece)
- Allegiance: (Greece) First Hellenic Republic
- Branch: Hellenic Army
- Conflicts: Greek War of Independence; Third Siege of Missolonghi †
- Other work: Member of the First National Assembly at Epidaurus

Fotos Bomporis or Fotios Bomporis (Greek: Φώτος Μπόμπορης or Φώτιος Μπόμπορης; died 28 February 1826), from Kranea was a Greek politician and chieftain of the Greek Revolution of 1821, deputy of the Souliotes in the First National Assembly at Epidaurus.

He was one of the most notable chieftains of Souli in the early 19th century and leader of a rebel force under Markos Botsaris during the Revolution. He was present in Missolonghi on 4 November 1821 during the formation of the Senate of Western Continental Greece, as a "commissioner of Captains from Souli". He acted as deputy of the Souliotes in the First National Assembly at Epidaurus, by Markos Botsaris' suggestion, and he then became part of the Legislature. He was killed outside of Missolonghi, on 28 February 1826, while attacking a Turkish rampant. His dead body was taken from the Ottomans by men of his group, who transferred it to Missolonghi and buried it, the next day, in an individual grave with general honours. The mention on the cross on his grave that he Fell in the Exodus is not accurate, as he had already been killed before the Exodus of Missolonghi.
