= Karl von Normann-Ehrenfels =

Württembergian soldier (1784–1822)

Graf Karl von Normann-Ehrenfels
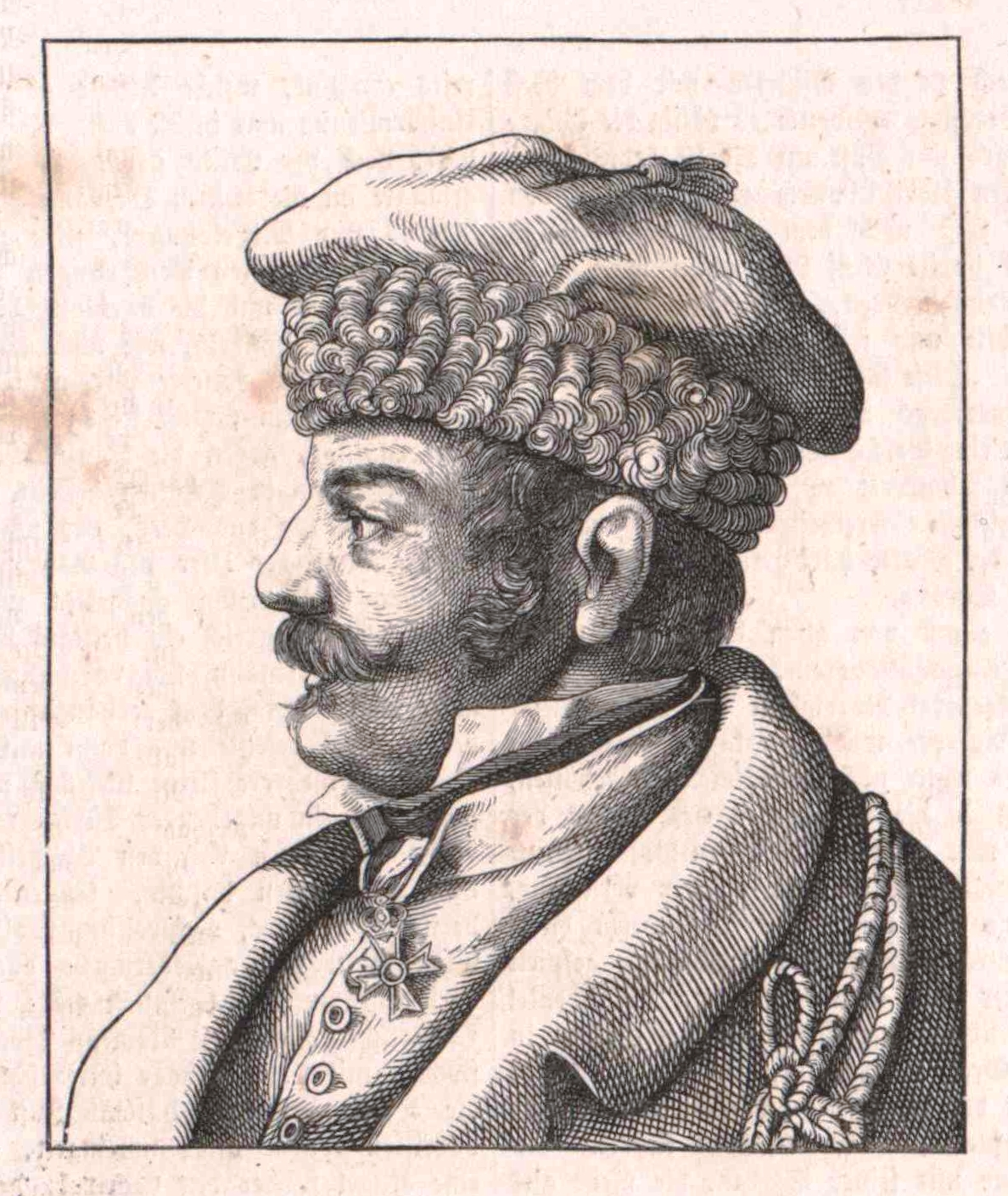
- Woodcut of Karl von Normann-Ehrenfels
- Born: 14 September 1784; Stuttgart, Duchy of Württemberg
- Died: 15 November 1822 (aged 38); Missolonghi, Greece
- Military career
- Allegiance: Habsburg monarchy Kingdom of Württemberg; First Hellenic Republic
- Branch: Army
- Service years: 1799–1817, 1822
- Rank: Major general (Württemberg); Chief of staff (Greece)
- Commands: Württemberg Cavalry Brigade; Leib-Chevauxleger Regiment
- Conflicts: Napoleonic Wars; French invasion of Russia; Greek War of Independence; Battle of Peta

Karl Friedrich Leberecht Graf von Normann-Ehrenfels (Greek: Κάρολος Νόρμαν, Stuttgart, 14 September 1784 – Missolonghi, 15 November 1822) was a Württembergian soldier who fought in the Napoleonic Wars. As a Philhellene he sailed to Greece to assist the Greek rebels in the Greek War of Independence, and died there of wounds received in the Battle of Peta.

== Biography ==
Karl von Normann-Ehrenfels was one of the sons of the jurist Philipp Christian von Normann-Ehrenfels, who served as the Kingdom of Württemberg's chief minister in 1806–1812. In 1799 he joined an Austrian cuirassier regiment. He quickly gained a commission as an officer and served alongside the Austrians until the Peace of Luneville. With the help of his father, he then switched to the Württemberg military, rising to the rank of lieutenant colonel and commander of the Leib-Chevauxleger by 1810. In 1812, he led his regiment in the French invasion of Russia. In 1813, as a major general, he organized and led a cavalry brigade, initially alongside the French, but on 18 October he went over to the Coalition forces, even though Württemberg continued to stand by its alliance with Napoleon. This action caused King Frederick I of Württemberg to prohibit Normann from returning to Württemberg; only after the King's death, in March 1817, was he able to secure his return to his homeland, although he was still prohibited from entering the capital, Stuttgart.

After his father's death he succeeded him as master of his estates at Ehrenfels, but in early 1822, along with other philhellenes, he sailed to Greece to assist the Greek rebels in their uprising against the Ottoman Empire. He served as chief of staff to Alexandros Mavrokordatos in the disastrous Battle of Peta on 16 July 1822, and died of his wounds a few months later at Missolonghi.

== Sources ==
- "Normann, Karl Friedrich Lebrecht". Deutsche Biographie (in German). Archived from the original on 19 July 2013.
