= Peloponnesian Senate =

Provisional government of the Peloponnese Islands (1821–23)

Senate of the entire People of the Peloponnese provinces Γερουσία όλου του Δήμου των επαρχιών της Πελοποννήσου
- 1821–1823
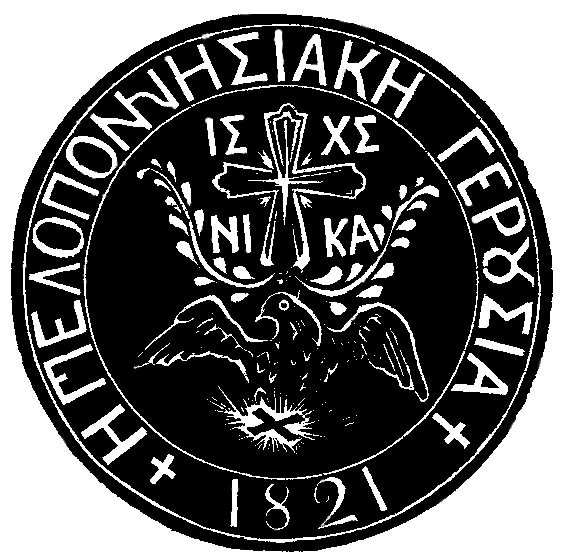
- Seal of the Peloponnesian Senate
- Status: Regional government in revolt against the Ottoman Empire
- Capital: Chrysopege Monastery, Tripolitsa
- Common languages: Greek
- Religion: Greek Orthodox
- Government: Republic
  - 1821–1822: Bishop Theodoritos of Vresthena
  - 1822–1823: Asimakis Fotilas
- History
  - Established: 26 May 1821
  - Second National Assembly at Astros: April 1823
| Preceded by | Succeeded by |
| Messenian Senate; Morea Eyalet | First Hellenic Republic |

The Senate of the entire People of the Peloponnese provinces (Greek: Γερουσία όλου του Δήμου των επαρχιών της Πελοποννήσου), commonly known as the Peloponnesian Senate (Πελοποννησιακή Γερουσία), was a provisional regime that existed in the Peloponnese during the early stages of the Greek War of Independence.

== History ==
On 25 March 1821 (all the dates are given according to the Julian calendar), a few days after the outbreak of the Greek War of Independence in March 1821, the rebels of the southern Peloponnese, led by the Maniots, assembled at Kalamata and founded the Greek rebels' first organ of government, the Messenian Senate. As the uprising spread through Greece, the Messenian Senate's leader, Petrobey Mavromichalis, invited representatives from the rest of the Peloponnese in an assembly held at the Kaltetza Monastery. There, on 26 May the "Senate of the entire People of the Peloponnese provinces", commonly known, from the legend on its seal, as the "Peloponnesian Senate" and as the "Senate of Kaltetza" (Γερουσία των Καλτετζών), was founded, with Bishop Theodoritos of Vresthena as president and Rigas Palamidis as secretary. Sotirios Charalambis, Athanasios Kanakaris, Anagnostis Deligiannis, Theocharis Rentis and Nikolaos Poniropoulos were members. Unlike the modern concept of a "senate" as the upper body of parliament, the Peloponnesian Senate was both a legislative and executive organ. The Senate's constitutional charter was created on 15 December 1821.

On 27 May 1821, the Senate moved its seat to the Chrysopege Monastery in Stemnitsa. After the capture of Tripolitsa in September, the Senate established itself in the town in February 1822. The Peloponnesian Senate continued in existence (with Asimakis Fotilas as president after February 1822) until it was dissolved by the Second National Assembly at Astros in April 1823.
