= Athanasios Kanakaris =

Greek politician

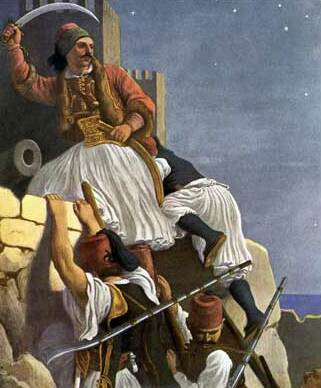
- Athanasios Kanakaris during the siege of Patras by Peter von Hess
- Native name: Αθανάσιος Κανακάρης
- Born: 1760; Patras, Morea Eyalet, Ottoman Empire (now Greece)
- Died: 15 January 1823 (aged 62–63) Ermioni, Morea Eyalet, Ottoman Empire (now Greece)
- Allegiance: (Greece) First Hellenic Republic
- Branch: Hellenic Army
- Conflicts: Greek War of Independence; Siege of Patras
- Spouse: Paraskevi Kostaki
- Children: Benizelos Roufos; Angeliki
- Other work: Member of the Filiki Etaireia; Member of the Peloponnesian Senate; Member of the First National Assembly at Epidaurus

Athanasios Kanakaris (Greek: Αθανάσιος Κανακάρης; 1760 in Patras – 14 January 1823 in Ermioni) was a Greek politician. He fought in the Greek War of Independence against the Ottoman Empire.

He was born in Patras in 1760. His father was Benizelos Roufos (elder), who belonged to a wealthy family of Sicilian descent, that had settled in Patras during the 1600s. His mother was Angeliki Kanakaris, who was a member of a Greek family that originated from Livadeia, and had settled in Patras at approximately the 1600s. Kanakaris was elected as a headsman of Patras in 1785, and became one of the most influential Greek magnates in the Morea. While serving as the province's representative to the Porte, he became a member of the Filiki Eteria. During the Greek War of Independence, he served as a member of the Peloponnesian Senate and of the First National Assembly at Epidaurus, and contributed from his personal fortune to the Greek cause. From 13 January 1822 until his death due to illness, in 1823, he served as deputy president of the Executive Corps of the Greek provisional government, under Alexandros Mavrokordatos.

His son, was also named Benizelos Roufos and served as Prime Minister of Greece later on. Other members of the family served as mayors, members of parliament and ministers.

He married Paraskevi Kostaki, and in addition to the aforementioned son, they also had a daughter named Angeliki.
