= Theoklitos Farmakidis =

Greek cleric and journalist (1784–1860)

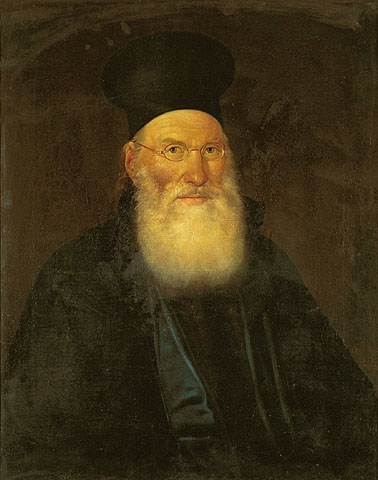
- Theoklitos Farmakidis; Portrait by Dionysios Tsokos
- Born: 15 January 1784; Nibegler, Ottoman Empire
- Died: 26 April 1860 (aged 76); Athens, Kingdom of Greece

Philosophical work
- Era: Age of Enlightenment
- Region: Western philosophy
- School: Liberalism, Modern Greek Enlightenment
- Main interests: Freedom of religion, Greek Independence

Theoklitos Farmakidis (born Theoharis Farmakidis; Greek: Θεόκλητος (Θεοχάρης) Φαρμακίδης; 1784–1860) was a Greek scholar and journalist. He was a notable figure of the Modern Greek Enlightenment.

== Biography ==
He was born in 1784 in Nibegler (Νιμπεγλέρ) near Larissa, in the Thessaly region of northern Greece. He studied at the Phanar Greek Orthodox College and the Princely Academy of Iași. After Anthimos Gazis he continued the publishing of Hermes o Logios with his partner Konstantinos Kokkinakis. He joined the Philiki Etaireia and became an admirer of Adamantios Korais, supporter of Greek independence and critic of the Ecumenical Patriarchate of Constantinople.

=== Greek Revolution ===
After the outbreak of the Greek War of Independence, he approached Dimitrios Ypsilantis. In August 1821, in Kalamata he started publishing the Greek newspaper Elliniki Salpinx ("Greek Bugle"). He took part at the National Assemblies of Epidaurus and Astros and later he taught in the Ionian Academy (1823-1825).

== Thought ==
He was a supporter of the English party and Alexandros Mavrokordatos. During the reign of Otto, he was advisor on ecclesiastical/religious matters and supporter of the establishment of the Church of Greece. He was liberal and tolerant to the different dogmas and became friend with Jonas King, the controversial Protestant missionary in Greece.

A strongly pro-West supporter, he was against the Greek involvement in the Crimean War.

== Selected works ==
- Elements of the Greek language, Athens, 1815
- Apology, Athens, 1840
- The Synodal Tome or About the Truth, Athens, 1852

== Sources ==
- Βγένα Α. Βαρθολομαίου, Η δίκη του Θεόκλητου Φαρμακίδη (1829-1839), Μνήμων 4 (1974), σελ. 172–214.
