= Sotirakis Londos =

Sotirios Londos (Greek: Σωτήριος Λόντος), better known as Sotirakis (Σωτηράκης), was a prominent Greek magnate and notable during the last decades of Ottoman rule in the Peloponnese.

Sotirakis Londos was the grandson of Golfinos Londos, the founder of the Londos family in the Nezera area of Achaea. Sotirakis moved away from Nezera and established himself at Vostitsa (modern Aigio), where he founded a new branch of the family. He quickly distinguished himself for his prudence and courage. After being sent as vekil (representative) of the Morea to the Sublime Porte, on his return in 1799 he was named to the position of mora ayan (μοραγιάνης), i.e. the most senior rank of the local notables of the Peloponnese (Morea), who were members of the provincial council advising the governor of the Morea Eyalet. He was accorded the special privilege of being consulted on the choice of the local archbishops, aiming to ensure that no foreigners were appointed to such posts.

He was executed by decapitation on 13 December 1812 (O.S.) at Tripoli by the Ottoman governor of the Morea. His son, Andreas Londos, became an important military and political leader of the Greek War of Independence and in the subsequent Kingdom of Greece.

== Sources ==
- Aspreas, G. (1929). Μεγάλη Στρατιωτικὴ καὶ Ναυτικὴ Ἐγκυκλοπαιδεία. Tόμος Τέταρτος: Καβάδης–Μωριάς [Great Military and Naval Encyclopaedia. Volume IV: Kavadh–Morea] (in Greek). Athens: Ἔκδοσις Μεγάλης Στρατιωτικῆς καὶ Ναυτικῆς Ἐγκυκλοπαιδείας. p. 376. OCLC 31255024.
- Fotopoulos, Athanasios Th. (2005). Οι κοτζαμπάσηδες της Πελοποννήσου κατά τη δεύτερη τουρκοκρατία (1715-1821) [The Kodjabashis of the Peloponnese during the Second Turkish Rule (1715–1821)] (in Greek). Athens: Irodotos. ISBN 978-960-825646-0.
