= Adam Doukas =

Greek revolutionary and politician

Adam Doukas (Greek: Αδάμ Δούκας, 1790-1860) was a Greek revolutionary and politician.

Doukas was born in 1790 in Permet, then Ottoman Empire, now in southern Albania. He then moved to Ioannina where he attended the local Maroutsaia School. At the time of the outbreak of the Greek War of Independence (1821) he lived in Livadeia in Central Greece. He became one of the most important political leaders of the Greek Revolution in Eastern Central Greece and Euboea. Doukas was politically attached to Ioannis Kolettis and his French Party. Doukas was also in close contact with the most important local military figures of the War of Independence. He participated in the First National Assembly at Epidaurus (1821–1822) as a representative of Thebes, as well as in the Fourth National Assembly at Argos. In 1825 he became Minister of War in the revolutionary government of Greece. He latter participated in the liberation of Euboea by the Greek forces and was in charge of the surrender committee of the Ottoman garrison in Karystos, southern Euboea, in April 1833.

After the end of the successful national struggle Doukas became member of various state cabinets from 1850 to 1860, during the reign of King Otto. He died in Euboea in 1860.

== Sources ==
- Petropoulos, John Anthony (1968). Politics and Statecraft in the Kingdom of Greece: 1833-1843. Princeton University Press. ISBN 9780691051444. "adam doukas."
