= Ioannis Orlandos =

Greek politician

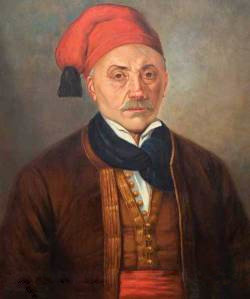
- Ioannis Orlandos by Konstantinos Palaiologos
- Native name: Ιωάννης Ορλάνδος
- Born: c. 1770; Spetses, Ottoman Empire (now Greece)
- Died: 1852 Hydra, Kingdom of Greece
- Allegiance: (Greece) First Hellenic Republic; Kingdom of Greece
- Conflicts: Greek War of Independence
- Other work: Delegate at the First National Assembly at Epidaurus; Founding member of the Archaeological Society of Athens

Ioannis Orlandos (Greek: Ιωάννης Ορλάνδος) was a Greek politician and revolutionary who participated in the Greek War of Independence.

== Early life and Greek Revolution ==
His father Constantinos-Anagnostis Orlandos came from Spetses to Hydra in 1781. He was married with the daughter of Theodoros Ghikas, a notable citizen of Hydra. Orlandos was an Arvanite and spoke fluently the local Arvanitika of Hydra. His correspondence with Georgios Kountouriotis is one of the few texts which have preserved the features of Hydriot Arvanitika. In Hydra, where he had been living since 1811, he married the sister of Georgios and Lazaros Kountouriotis, Hydriote landlords and shipowners. He was also a significant shipowner before the revolution. At the start of it, he gave all his ships to the revolutionary government. He became a delegate from Hydra at the First National Assembly at Epidaurus and a member of the twelve-member committee that modified the text of the first constitution. He had the position of the vice-president of the legislative corps from 13 January until April 1823. On 26 April and after Lazaros Kountouriotis denied the position, he was elected president of the legislative corps. A month later, on 22 May 1823, disappointed by the way politics had taken and anticipating the upcoming civil war, he resigned from his post. His political opponents had already accused him of factionalism due to the assistance he provided to Kountouriotis. In June 1823 he became a member of a committee jointly with Andreas Louriotis and Andreas Zaimis to negotiate about a loan in London. Before departing for the British capital, he wrote a letter about the need for unity and avoidance of civil wars. Also, in November 1823 he visited Lord Byron in Kephalonia. In January 1824, he and Louriotis, a man of Mavrokordatos, were the Greek ambassadors who negotiated and finally borrowed the first loan from Britain during the revolution, £800,000. In London, they were formally welcomed and they even met the Secretary of State for Foreign Affairs, George Canning. He was a member of the delegation who, in 1825, summed the second loan, £2,000,000. He returned to Greece on 1825 and continued representing Hydra at the National Assemblies.

== Life in independent Greece ==
Orlandos was a member of the English Party, considering the UK as the most effective country as of helping the revolution. He selected them due to the Kingdom's liberal political heritage and also its superiority in the sea. Then, he joined the anti-Kapodistrian faction stating that he preferred Greece a British protectorate instead of tolerating Ioannis Kapodistrias' authoritarian administration. So he took part in the anti-Kapodistrian demonstrations of Hydra, during the summer of 1831. After all these and in searching for scapegoats to apologize for the loans, he and Louriotis were accused of wrongful administration. They were firstly acquitted but, in 1835 the court characterised them responsible for the loss of £28,769. In 1839 they published their huge apology in two volumes which they later renounced. In 1837 he was one of the founding members of the Archaeological Society of Athens.
