= Matina Kolokotronis =

American basketball executive (born 1964)

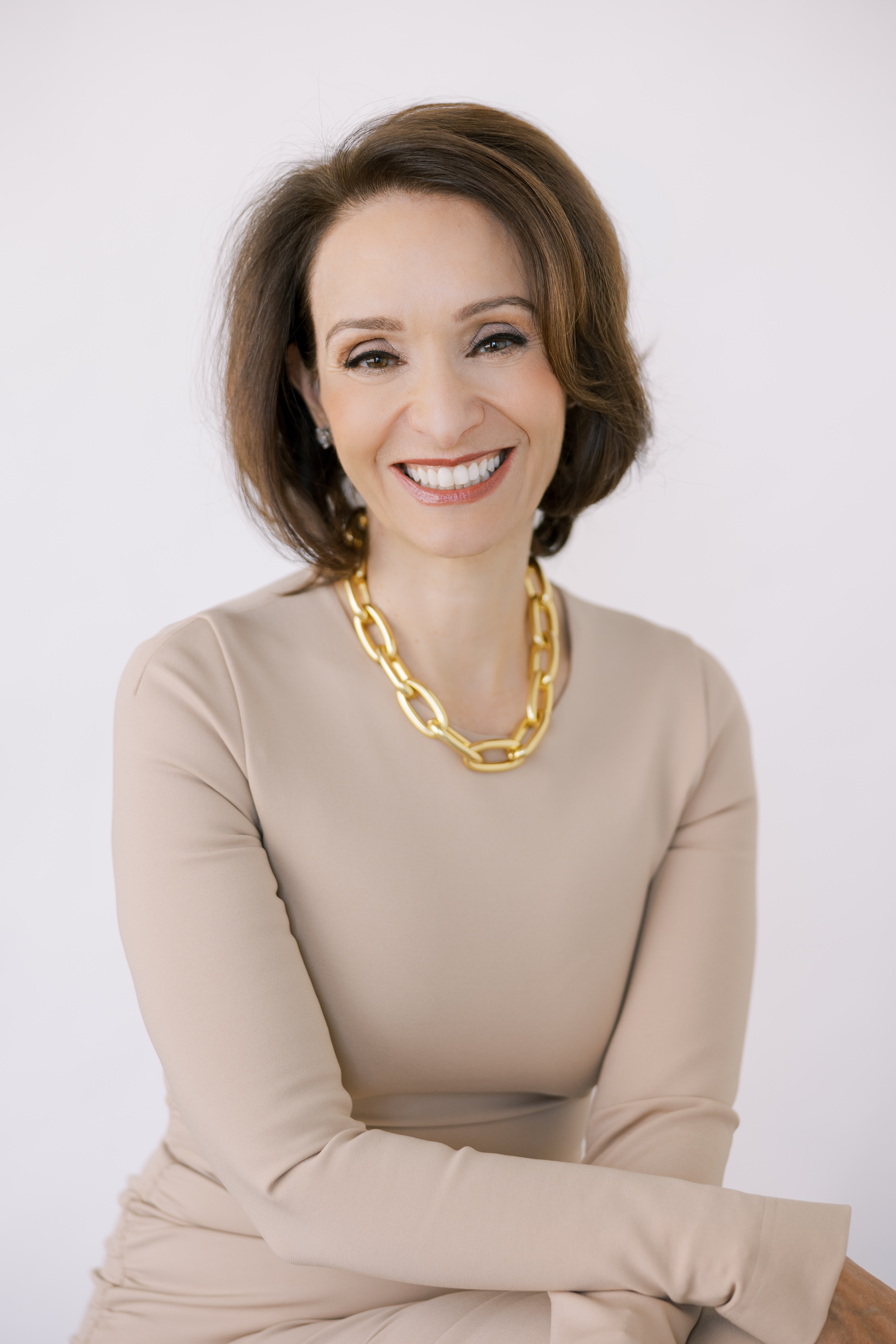

Sacramento Kings
- Position: Chief Operating Officer
- League: NBA

Personal information
- Born: November 21, 1964 (age 61) Chicago, Illinois

Career information
- College: Loyola University Chicago & McGeorge School of Law

Matina Kolokotronis (born November 21, 1964) is Chief Operating Officer of the Sacramento Kings of the National Basketball Association. Kolokotronis is in her 27th season with the Kings.

== Early life ==
Born in Chicago, Illinois, Kolokotronis is the second of four daughters born to Greek immigrants. Kolokotronis received her B.A. from Loyola University, Chicago, and her law degree from McGeorge Law School, University of the Pacific (United States).

== Personal ==
Kolokotronis's husband, Sotiris Kolokotronis, is a real estate developer in Sacramento. They have three children.
