= Dionysios Petrakis =

Greek abbot and politician

- Διονύσιος Πετράκης
- Born: 18th-century Greece
- Died: 19th-century Greece

Dionysius Petrakis (Greek: Διονύσιος Πετράκης) was a Greek monk - abbot of the Petraki Monastery - and politician. He took part in the Greek Revolution of 1821, and was a member of the first National Assembly of Epidaurus.
