= Battle of the Trench (1821) =

Battle during the Greek War of Independence

- Part of the Greek War of Independence
Date	10 August 1821 (Note: Greece officially adopted the Gregorian calendar on 16 February 1923 (which became 1 March). All dates prior to that, unless specifically denoted, are Old Style.)
Location	Loukas, Morea Eyalet, Ottoman Empire (now Arcadia, Greece) 37.566°N 22.460°E
Result	Greek victory

Belligerents
Greek revolutionaries	Ottoman Empire

Commanders and leaders
Theodoros Kolokotronis; Dimitris Plapoutas; Dimitrios Deligiannis; Ioannis Dagres	Ali Bey (DOW); Kabır Kehaya †; Abdul Bölükbaşı †

Strength
~2,000	3,000

Casualties and losses
30 killed Numerous wounded	400 killed Numerous wounded

The Battle of the Trench (Greek: Μάχη της Γράνας) was fought near Tripolitsa in Arcadia in August 1821 between the Greek revolutionary forces led by Theodoros Kolokotronis and the Ottoman garrison of Tripolitsa during the first year of the Greek War of Independence. The battle ended with the complete victory of the Greeks.

== Prelude ==
In August 1821, the Greeks began the siege of Tripolitsa. The Ottomans who were besieged in the city attempted several night sallies in order to find supplies. When Theodoros Kolokotronis was called by the Greek revolutionaries to take over command of the siege, he ordered the digging of a trench (grana) one meter deep and two meters wide running from Mytikas in the village of Benteni up to the hill near the village of Loukas where the chieftain Ioannis Dagres held the position. This entire project designed to intercept the Ottoman sorties covering a distance of approximately 700 meters, was completed by the peasants of the region in three days.

== Battle ==
During the night of 9–10 August, an Ottoman force of 3,000 infantry and cavalrymen sallied from Tripolitsa to Loukas hill in order to attack the force of Ioannis Dagres and also for their usual raid for supplies. After looting several villages in the wider area, they attacked Dagres' force at dawn, putting the Greeks in a difficult position. Kolokotronis, realising the seriousness of the situation, ordered Plapoutas, Dimitrios Deligiannis, Papazafiropoulos, Christopoulos, George Aulakos and the armed Greeks of Tripolitsa to occupy positions within the trench, while he placed other forces behind the fences of the vineyards, as well as ordering other troops to come to assistance. Moreover, in order to lessen the pressure on the trench, he ordered a diversionary attack by the forces of Demetrios Ypsilantis, Anagnostaras and Panagiotis Giatrakos.

While the forces of Ali Bey had put Dagres and his men in a difficult position, they realised the imminent danger and retreated in order to avoid being cut off. As they attempted to withdraw, they found themselves being pursued and came upon the Greeks positioned in the trench.

Although the position of the retreating Turks was perilous, their situation temporarily improved when the garrison cavalry came to their aid. Both the Turkish foot soldiers and the cavalry, however, suffered heavy losses as they tried to cross the trench. At the same time, additional Turkish forces left Tripolitsa attempting to rescue their comrades, leading to a general engagement on two fronts. Kolokotronis, followed by his bodyguard, moved between fronts encouraging his men. Eventually, the Turks caved in and retreated in disorder towards Tripolitsa.

== Losses ==
During the battle, the Ottomans lost about 400 men. Most of the Turks were killed during the failed attempt to cross the trench. Among the dead were several prominent Ottomans of Tripolitsa such as Abdul Bölükbaşı (son of the local lord Sheikh Tahir Efendi) and Kabır Kehaya. Ali Bey also died of his wounds three days after the battle. The Turks also abandoned and lost on the battlefield that day all of their animal carts and provisions.

On the Greek side, thirty men were killed, including the brother of Ioannis Dagres, Thanasis. There were also numerous men wounded, including the minor leaders Apostolis Kolokotronis and Georgios Dritsas, who died a few days later.

== Aftermath ==
The successful outcome of this battle for the Greek forces, contributed greatly to the acceleration of the subsequent capture of Tripolitsa by the Greek revolutionaries. The Ottomans suffered considerable losses and the ability to forage which caused a sharp decline in morale.
