= First National Assembly at Epidaurus =

First Greek national assembly

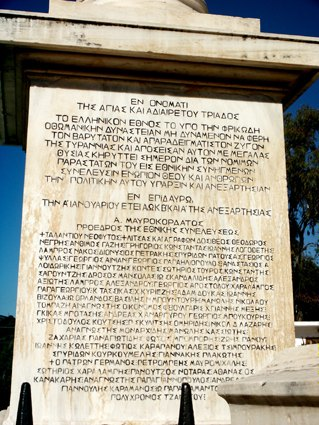
Bottom part of the monument, containing the beginning of the Greek Constitution of 1822, declaring the independence of the Greek nation from the Ottoman Empire.

The First National Assembly of Epidaurus (Greek: Αʹ Εθνοσυνέλευση της Επιδαύρου, 1821–1822) was the first meeting of the Greek National Assembly, a national representative political gathering of the Greek revolutionaries.

== History ==
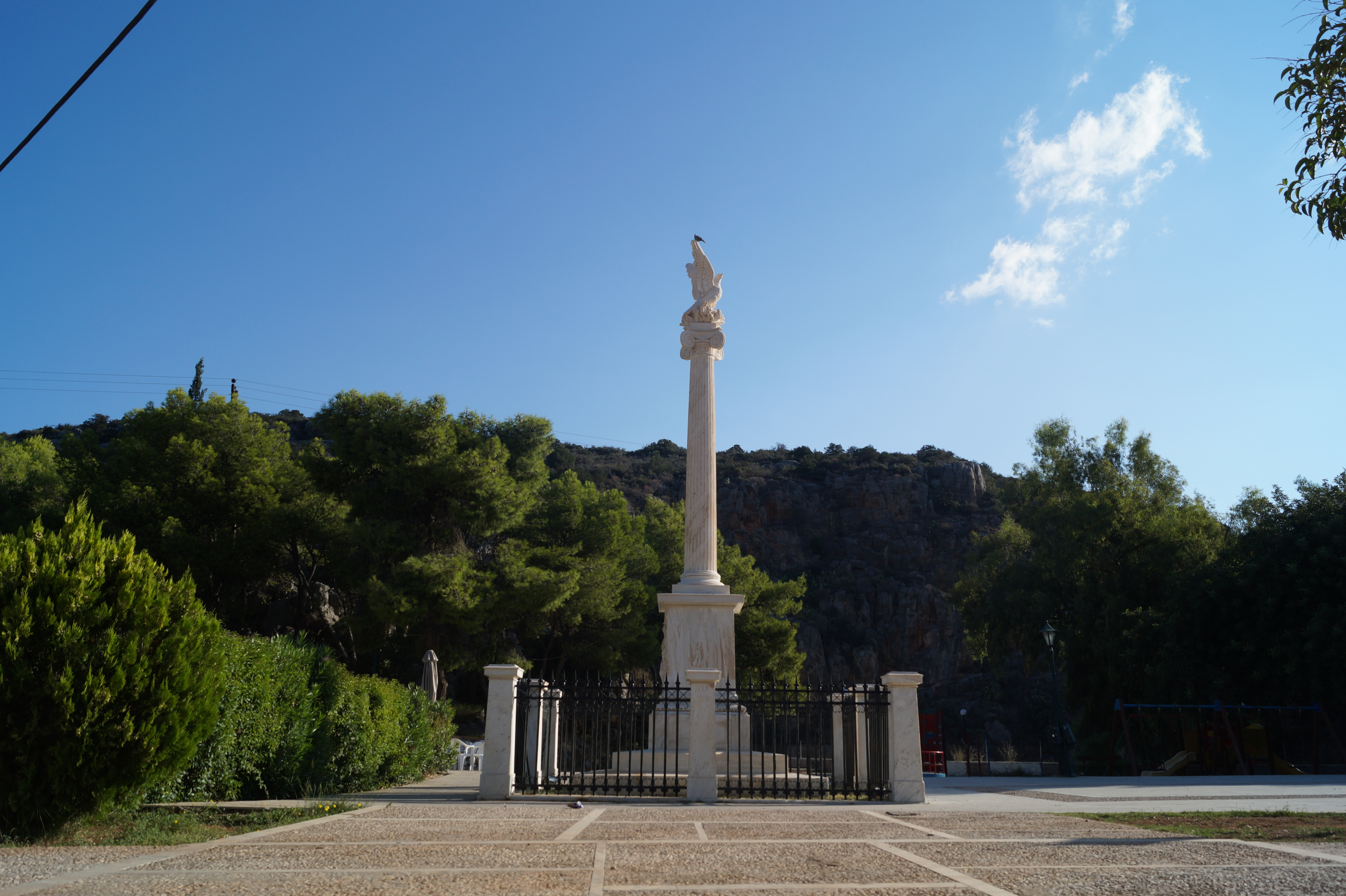
The monument

The assembly opened in December 1821 at Piada (today Nea (New) Epidavros). It was attended by representatives from regions involved in the revolution against Ottoman rule.

The majority of the representatives were local notables and clergymen from the Peloponnese, Central Greece and the islands. In addition, a number of Phanariots and academics attended. However, a number of prominent revolutionaries, including Alexander Ypsilantis and the most prominent military leaders were absent. Of the 59 representatives at the assembly, 20 were landowners, 13 were ship-owners, 12 were intellectuals, 4 were military leaders, 3 were archpriests, 3 were merchants.

The first document adopted by the assembly proclaimed the independence of the Greek nation from the Ottoman Empire. The first paragraph was:

" In the name of the Holy and Indivisible Trinity.
The Greek nation, wearied by the dreadful weight of Ottoman oppression, and resolved to break its yoke, though at the price of the greatest sacrifice, proclaims today before God and man, by the organ of its lawful representatives, met in national assembly, its independence."

It also passed a number of other important documents, including:

- The Provisional Regime of Greece (Προσωρινό Πολίτευμα της Ελλάδος), sometimes translated as Temporary Constitution of Greece (more commonly known as the Greek Constitution of 1822), which also included a Declaration of Independence.

The Assembly elected a five-member executive on 15 January 1822, which was presided over by Alexandros Mavrokordatos. The executive in turn appointed the first government which had 8 ministries.

The first legislature had 33 members.

Another characteristic of the First National Assembly is the absence of any reference in the Constitution to the Filiki Eteria, although Demetrios Ypsilantis, brother of Alexander Ypsilantis and official representative of the Filiki Eteria, was appointed president of the legislature, a body controlled by the local notables.

== List of delegates ==
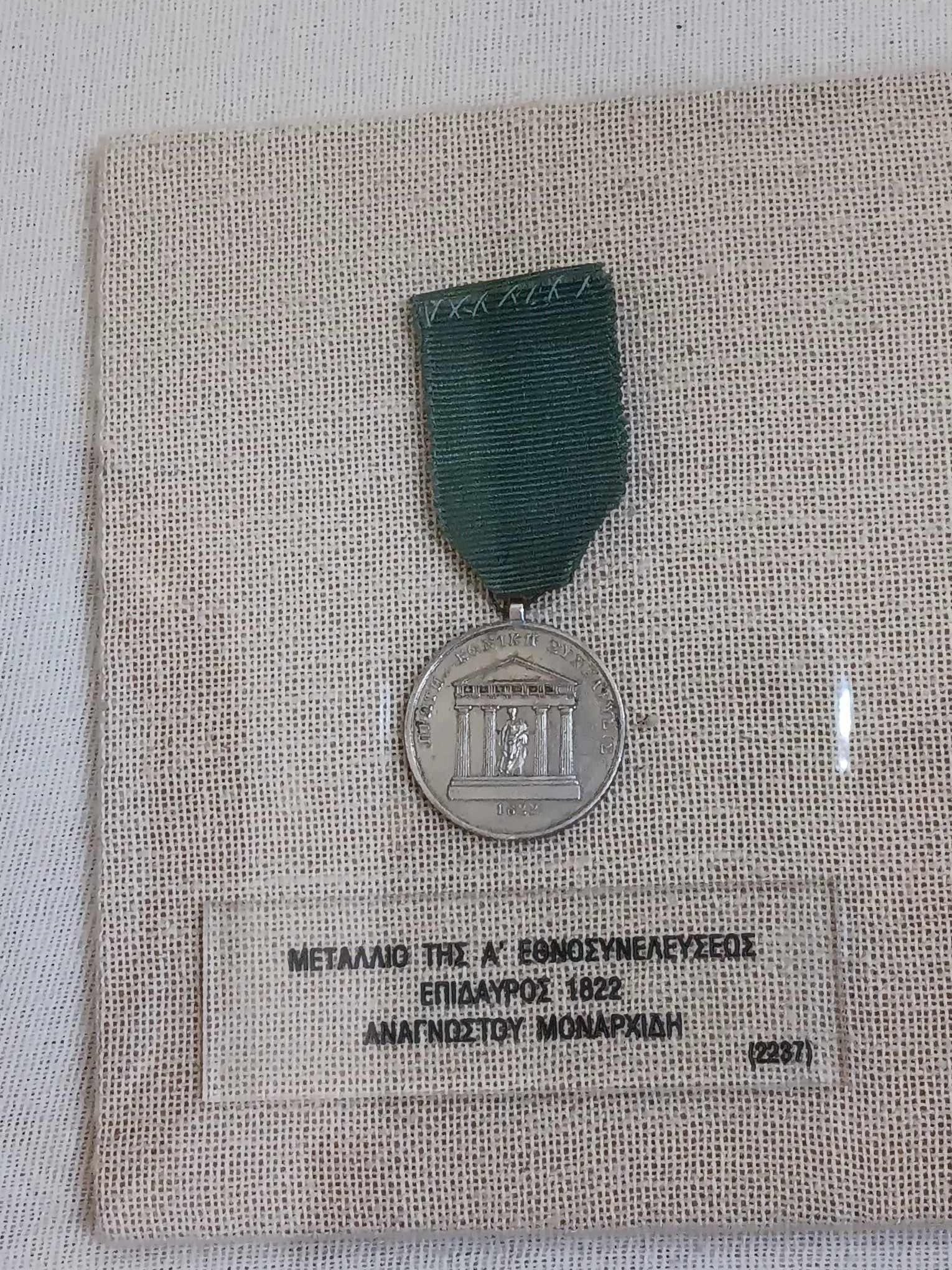
Medal awarded for the participation in the assembly to Anagnostis Monarchidis

Eastern Greece (included representatives from Thessaly/Macedonia)

- Lambros Alexandrou
- Alexandros Axiotis
- Georgios Ainian
- Adam Doukas
- Sotiris Douros
- Anthimos Gazis
- Grigorios Konstantas
- Giannoutsos Kontes
- Ioannis Logothetis
- Drosos Mansolas
- Ioannis Skandalidis
- Theoklitos Farmakidis
- Theodoros Negris
- Zacharias Panagiotidis
- Georgios Papailiopoulos
- Konstantinos Sapountzis
- Christoforos Perraivos

Hydra, Spetses, Psara

- Dimitrios Voulgaris
- Francescos Voulgaris
- Dimitrios Papanikolis
- Konstantinos Kanaris
- Anagnostis Monarchidis
- Ioannis Orlandos
- Iakovos Tombazis
- Emmanouil Tombazis
- Georgios Kountouriotis
- Andreas Miaoulis

Peloponnese

- Athanasios Kanakaris
- Theodoros Kolokotronis
- Germanos III of Old Patras
- Georgios Mavromichalis
- Dimitris Plapoutas
- Panoutsos Notaras
- Petrobey Mavromichalis
- Kyriakoulis Mavromichalis
- Konstantinos Mavromichalis
- Anagnostis Deligiannis
- Sotiris Charalambis
- Andreas Zaimis
- Ioannis Papadiamantopoulos

Western Greece

- Dimitrios Makris
- Alexandros Mavrokordatos
- Ioannis Kolettis
- Fotos Bomporis, as Representative of the Souliotes

Others

- Georgios Apostolou
- Markos Botsaris
- Kitsos Tzavelas
- Theophilos Kairis
- Asimakis Fotilas
- Kostas Botsaris
- Vincenzo Gallina
- Christodoulos Koutsis
- Benjamin of Lesbos
- Zois Panou
- Dimitrios Panourgias
- Charalambos Papageorgiou
- Georgios Karaiskakis
- Papaflessas
- Dionysios Petrakis
- Giannakis Plakotis
- Anastasios Polyzoidis
- Georgios Psyllas
- Neophytos Vamvas
- Nikolaos Vilaetis
- Demetrios Ypsilantis

== See also ==
- Executive of 1822
