= Battle of Peta =

1822 battle of the war of Greek independence

- Part of the Greek War of Independence
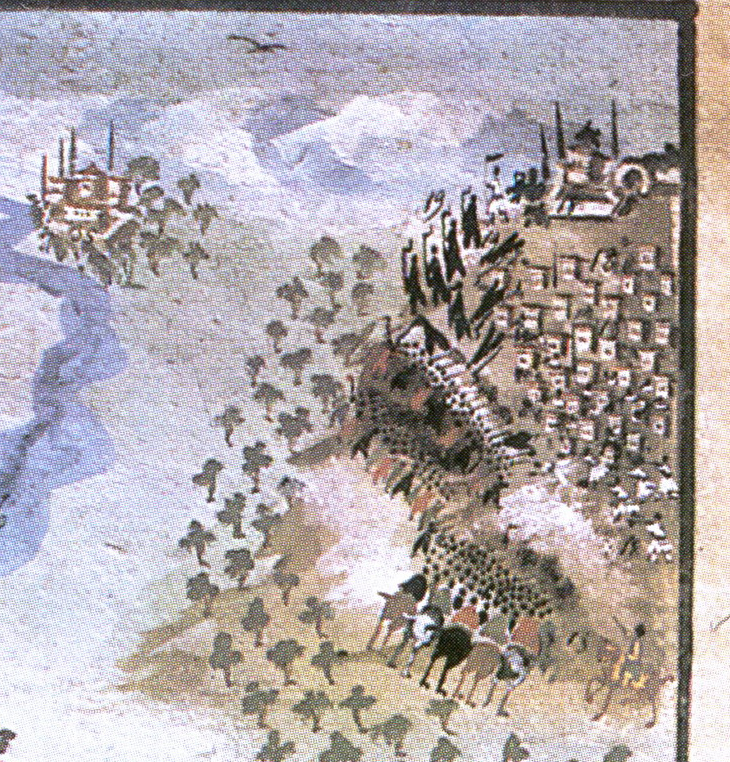
- The Battle of Peta by Panagiotis Zographos
Date	16 July 1822 (4 July Julian calendar)
Location	Peta, Sanjak of Ioannina, Ottoman Empire (now Arta, Greece) 39.1672798°N 21.0300179°E
Result	Ottoman victory

Belligerents
(Greece) First Hellenic Republic	Ottoman Empire

Commanders and leaders
Alexandros Mavrokordatos; Markos Botsaris; Panagiotis Rodios; Karl von Normann-Ehrenfels; Jean-François-Maxime Raybaud; Franciszek Mierzejewski	Omer Vrioni

Strength
2,100; 93 Philhellenes	6,000–8,000

Casualties and losses
268+ dead (including 68 Philhellenes); Many taken prisoner	Unknown

The Battle of Peta or Battle of Petta was fought between the Greeks (with Philhellenes) led by Alexandros Mavrokordatos with Markos Botsaris and the Ottomans led by Omer Vrioni on 16 July 1822 (4 July Julian calendar). The conflict occurred on a hillside near the village of Peta in Epirus.

== Background ==
After the Souliotes defeated the forces of Hurshid Pasha in May and June 1822, they joined Prince Alexander Mavrocordatos who landed at Missolonghi with a contingent of Greek regulars. At the same time, however, Hurshid Pasha surrendered command of the Ottoman forces in Epirus to the Albanian general Omer Vrioni. Joining the Greeks were one battalion of German, Polish, Swiss, French and Italian philhellene volunteers with Karl von Normann-Ehrenfels, formerly of the Württemberg army, serving as Mavrokordatos's chief of staff. Several of the Italian, German and French philhellenes were veterans of the Napoleonic wars and who trained a battalion of Greeks to fight in the Western-style of war. The philhellenes were far from united and in a duel a German shot a Frenchman dead. One French philhellene Jean-François-Maxime Raybaud reported: "It was unimaginably difficult to train the men in the harsh and precise details of service in the ranks, in strict discipline and in the advantages of systematic instruction, when these men were Europeans of a generally difficult temperament and different in their habits, education, language and weapons". Mavrokordatos's force of about 2,000 men, both regular and irregular were outnumbered by the Ottoman force of 10,000 (or 14.000)Turks and Albanians. Mavrokordhatos placed his men on two ridges to the west and east of the village of Peta, which stands on a low hill at the beginning of a coastal plain. On the higher ridge to the east of the village were placed Greek forces under Gogos Bakolas on the right, forces commanded by other captains Varnakiotis and Vlachopoulos in the middle while Markos Botsaris were on the left. On the western and lower ridge were the philhellenes with the Greek regulars under the Italian captain Taralla in the middle, volunteers from the British protectorate of the Ionian islands on the right and the philhellenes under the Italian Dania on the left. Bakolas and Botsaris were old enemies, both being rival klephts (bandits) and Mavrokordatos wanted to keep the two rivals as far as apart as possible as the two men hated on another.

== Battle ==
The Greek forces were encamped at Peta in Arta when a force of 7,000-8,000 Ottoman troops attacked their positions. The Ottomans advanced before dawn in a crescent formation with 600 horsemen charging on the right towards the western ridge. The Ottoman cavalry were surprised that no fire was returned, and only when they reached within a hundred feet of the ridge, did the philhellenes and the Greek regulars return fire, bringing down a lethal rain of bullets that cut down the Ottomans, who were not used to fighting a disciplined opponent in Greece. Over the next two hours, the Ottomans charged and charged again against the ridge, and were beaten off with heavy losses every time. On the north of the eastern ridge, Albanian irregulars attacked, but were initially repulsed by Bakolas's men. During the conflict, the Greeks and Philhellenes were betrayed by Gogos Bakolas, an old klepht and captain of the armatoloi. According to some accounts, Bakolas deliberately left his right flank unguarded and made no effort to fire upon the Albanians as they advanced on his right flank. When the Albanians scaled the ridge, Bakolas ordered his men to retreat and the Albanians made no effort to attack him as Bakolas had agreed before the battle to betray his own side. With the Albanians on the upper ridge, the other Greek forces were driven off. Once the eastern ridge was in Ottoman hands, the Ottoman seized the village of Peta and then attacked the Greek forces on the western ridge from behind. Attacked from both sides, the forces on the lower ridge were overwhelmed with most of the philhellenes and Greek regulars, who were now disorganized and out of formation making a desperate last stand against the Ottoman cavalry who cut them down without mercy. Bakolas's treachery resulted in the overall defeat of the Greeks.

== Aftermath ==
At the end of the conflict, the entire Philhellenes' Battalion suffered massive casualties. Of the philhellenes killed included both the Italian officers Dania and Tarella and the overall losses were 67 philhellenes killed, of whom 34 were German, 12 Italian, 9 Polish, 7 French, 1 Dutch and 1 Hungarian. Despite Botsaris's brave efforts, he was forced to flee to Mesolonghi with Prince Mavrokordatos.

The defeat had a negative impact on the prestige of Mavrokordatos, such as to the supporters of the necessity for a regular Greek army. The sympathies and support of the Greek revolutionaries were moved towards the military leaders (captains) of Peloponnese, especially Kolokotronis.

== Sources ==
- Kitromilides, Paschalis (2021). The Greek Revolution: A Critical Dictionary. Harvard University Press. ISBN 978-0674259317.
