= Iakovos Tombazis =

Greek admiral

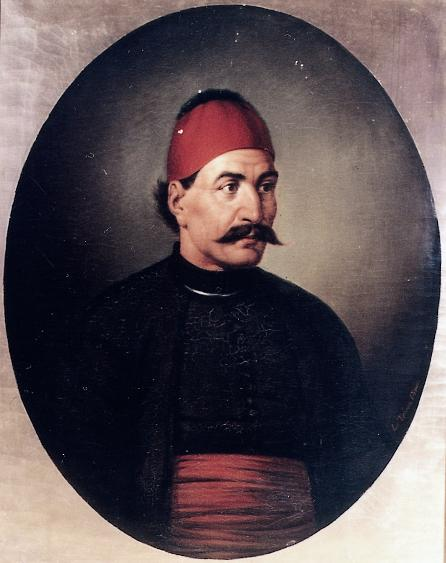
- A portrait of Iakovos Tombazis by Dionysios Tsokos
- Native name: Ιάκωβος Τομπάζης
- Nicknames: Yiakoumakis; Γιακουμάκης
- Born: c. 1782; Hydra, Ottoman Empire (now Greece)
- Died: 1829 Hydra, First Hellenic Republic
- Buried: Hydra
- Allegiance: (Greece) First Hellenic Republic
- Branch: Hellenic Navy
- Commands: First Admiral of the Hydra fleet Themistoklis
- Conflicts: Greek War of Independence
- Children: Georgios Tombazis
- Other work: Member of the Filiki Etaireia

Iakovos "Yiakoumakis" Tombazis (Greek: Ιάκωβος Τομπάζης, c. 1782–1829) was a Greek admiral, merchant and ship-owner from the Greek island of Hydra who became the first admiral of the Hellenic Navy during the Greek War of Independence.

== Biography ==
The Tombazis family migrated from Vourla, Smyrna to the island of Hydra in 1668. It was originally named Yakoumakis (Greek: Γιακουμάκης). Iakovos Tombazis' date of birth is not known but some historians suggest 1782. He was the son of Nikolaos Tombazis and brother of Emmanouil Tombazis.

As a businessman, he was shrewd and was the first to build greenhouses in Greece. In 1818, he was initiated into the Filiki Eteria (Friendly Society) which was preparing the ground for the revolt. When the war broke out, his fellow islanders made him admiral of the fleet of Hydra. He took part in several clashes against the Sultan's Navy in the eastern Aegean and soon realized that the Greek warships, being mostly converted and armed merchantmen, could not face the Ottoman ships of the line in conventional combat. He therefore proposed the use of fireships instead, and sent Dimitrios Papanikolis to burn the Turkish frigate Moving Mountain anchored at Eresos on Lesbos. Tombazis met fellow Hydriote Andreas Miaoulis in 1822 and reportedly realized the man's military genius, proposing him as admiral of the fleet. After Tombazis withdrew from the admiralty, he continued to support the revolution with his ships and money.

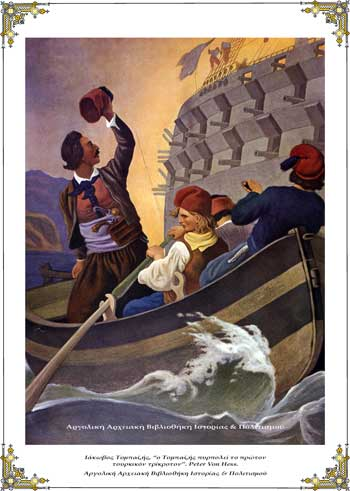
Tombazis by Peter von Hess

He died in 1829.

== Legacy ==
The Greek destroyer Tombazis (D-215) was named for the Admiral in 1976.

== Sources ==
- Iakovos Tombazis from Phantis Wiki
- The sailors of 1821(Οι ναυμάχοι του 1821), Historical Magazine(Περιοδικό Ιστορικά), Issue 178(Τεύχος 178). Αθήνα: Ελευθεροτυπία(Eleutherotipia). 2003.
- Κωνσταντίνα Αδαμοπούλου–Παύλου (Konstantina Adamopoulou-Pavlou); Αννίτα Πρασσά (Annita Prassa) (22 March 2012). "Tombazis Iakovos-Giakoumakis (1782-1829)" Τομπάζης Ιάκωβος ή Γιακουμάκης (1782-1829). ARCHIVES LIBRARY OF HISTORY AND CULTURE OF ARGOLIDA ΑΡΓΟΛΙΚΗ ΑΡΧΕΙΑΚΗ ΒΙΒΛΙΟΘΗΚΗ ΙΣΤΟΡΙΑΣ ΚΑΙ ΠΟΛΙΤΙΣΜΟΥ (in Greek).
