= Siege of Patras (1821) =

Battle of the Greek War of Independence

Coordinates: 38.2500°N 21.7333°E

- Part of the Greek War of Independence
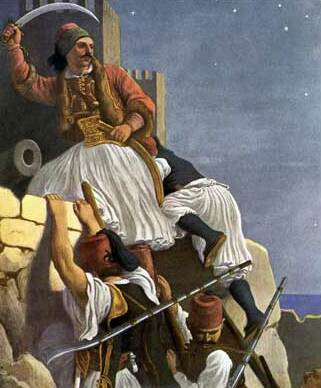
- Athanasios Kanakaris during the siege of Patras by Peter von Hess
Date	March 1821
Location	Patras, Morea Eyalet, Ottoman Empire (now Achaea, Greece)
Result	Greek victory; Capture of the city by the Greeks; Establishment of the Directorate of Achaea

Belligerents
Greek revolutionaries	Ottoman Empire

Commanders and leaders
Germanos of Patras; Athanasios Kanakaris; Andreas Londos; Benizelos Roufos; Panagiotis Karatzas; Ioannis Papadiamantopoulos	Unknown

Strength
1,500	Unknown

Casualties and losses
Unknown	Unknown

The siege of Patras was one of the first events of the Greek War of Independence. After the outbreak of the revolution, the Greeks under the leadership of the primates of Patras, captured the city and destroyed the Muslim quarter. The Greeks tried to capture also the main fortress of the city.

The flag raised over Patras by Andreas Londos.

In April, an Ottoman army lifted the siege and destroyed a large part of the city, with Patras remaining under Ottoman control almost until the end of the war (1828).

The consul of France in the city at the time was Hugo Pouqueville, brother of François Pouqueville, and for Great Britain Philip James Green.

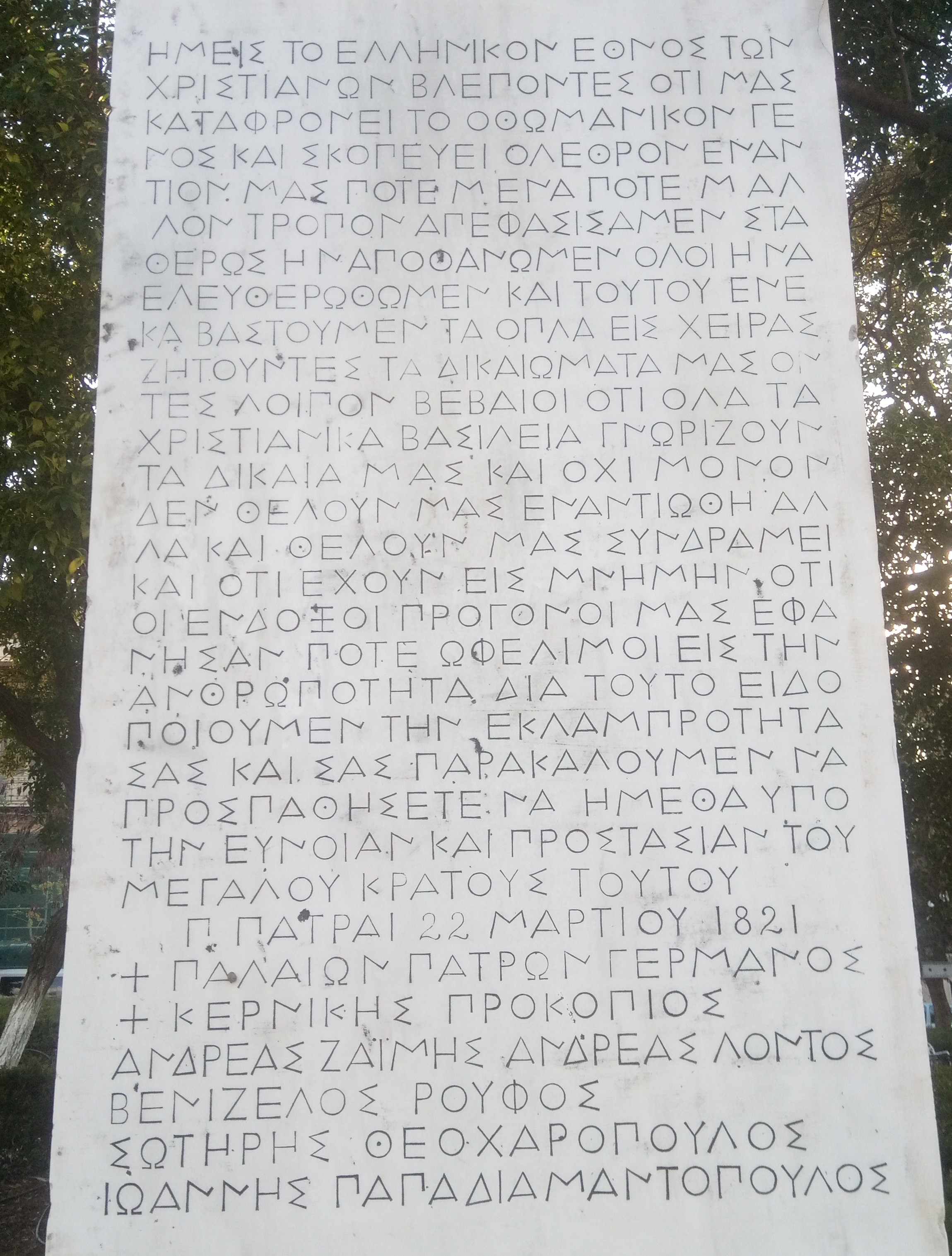
Declaration by the revolutionaries of Patras, engraved on a stele in the city

== Aftermath ==
In February 1822, after a victorious battle outside Patras (Battle of Girokomio), the Greeks under Theodoros Kolokotronis began again the siege of the fortress. It was after the defeat in the Battle of Peta, which allowed the Ottoman army to pass to Achaea, and the Expedition of Dramali that brought an end to the siege.
