= Second National Assembly at Astros =

Greek National Assembly in 1823

The Second National Assembly at Astros (Greek: Βʹ Εθνοσυνέλευση στο Άστρος) was the second Greek National Assembly, a national representative body of the Greeks who had rebelled against the Ottoman Empire.

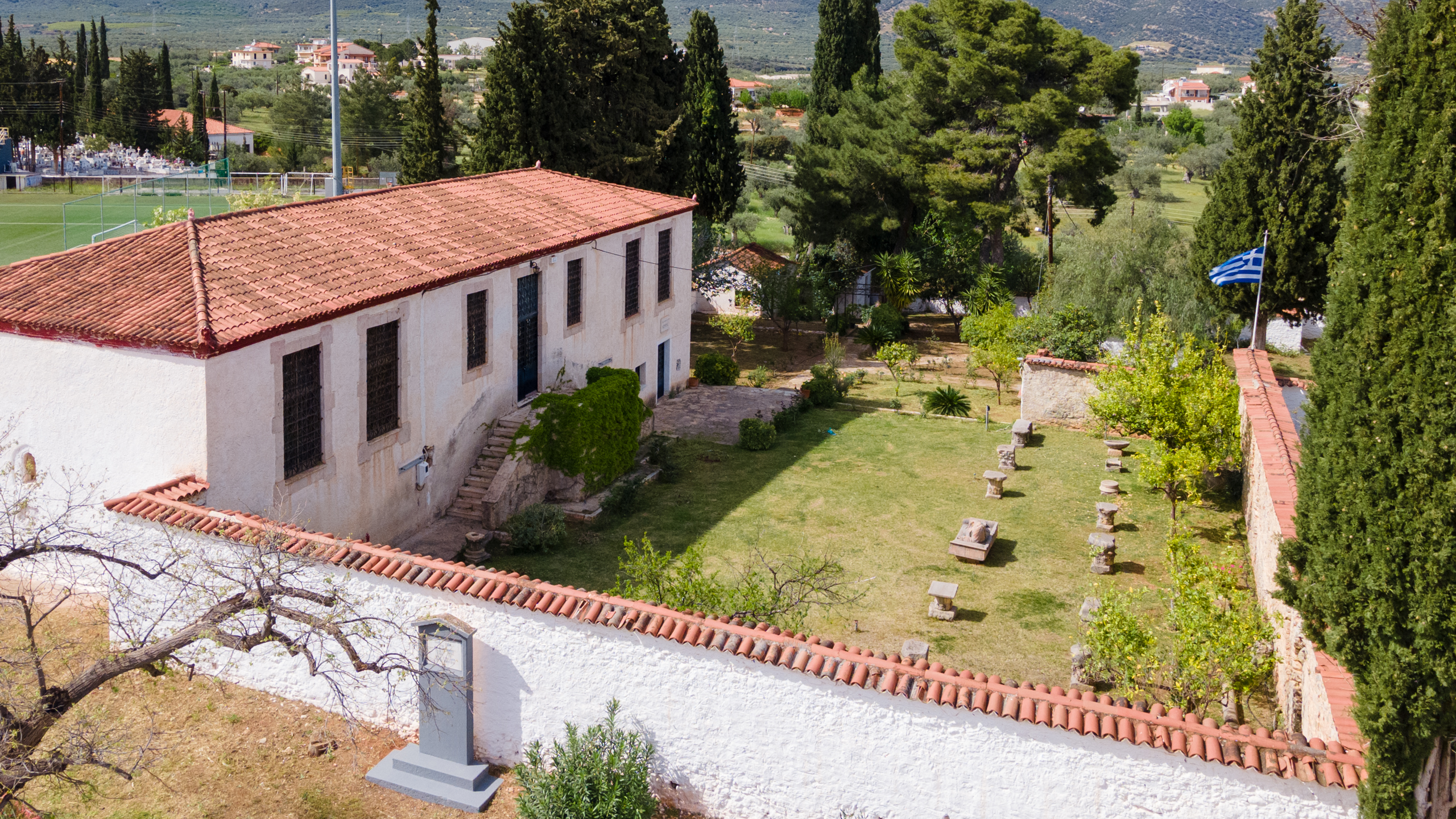
Today's Astros Archeological Museum is where the assembly took place.

== New constitution ==
It convened at Astros between 30 March and 18 April 1823 under the chairmanship of Petros Mavromichalis. Its most important task was the revision of the Constitution of Epidaurus, adopted in the First National Assembly. The new Constitution was voted on April 13 and was called the Epidaurus Law to stress its continuity with the one of 1822. It was legally more articulate as compared to its predecessor. It allowed a slight superiority to the Legislative power as opposed to the Executive, given the fact that the latter's veto power was circumcised from an absolute to a suspending one. The new Constitution also marked improvements as far as the protection of human rights was concerned: property was protected, as was the honor and the security not only of Greeks but of all persons on Greek territory; it established the freedom of the press and abolished slavery. It also abolished the previous local government bodies.

== Chosen presidents of government and parliament, decision to seek financial aid from the United Kingdom of Great Britain and Ireland ==
President of the Executive (government) was elected Petros Mavromichalis, of the Legislative (parliament) Ioannis Orlandos, while the delegates agreed also to seek financial aid and loan, mainly from the United Kingdom of Great Britain and Ireland. However, the great disadvantage of the yearly term of the Administrative branches remained unaltered, a result of the ever-growing distrust between politicians and the military. The Assembly of Astros passed a new electoral law, according to which the right to vote was bestowed to men rather than to seniors, while the voting age went down from 30 to 25 years.
