= Andreas Londos =

Greek military leader and politician

- Ανδρέας Λόντος
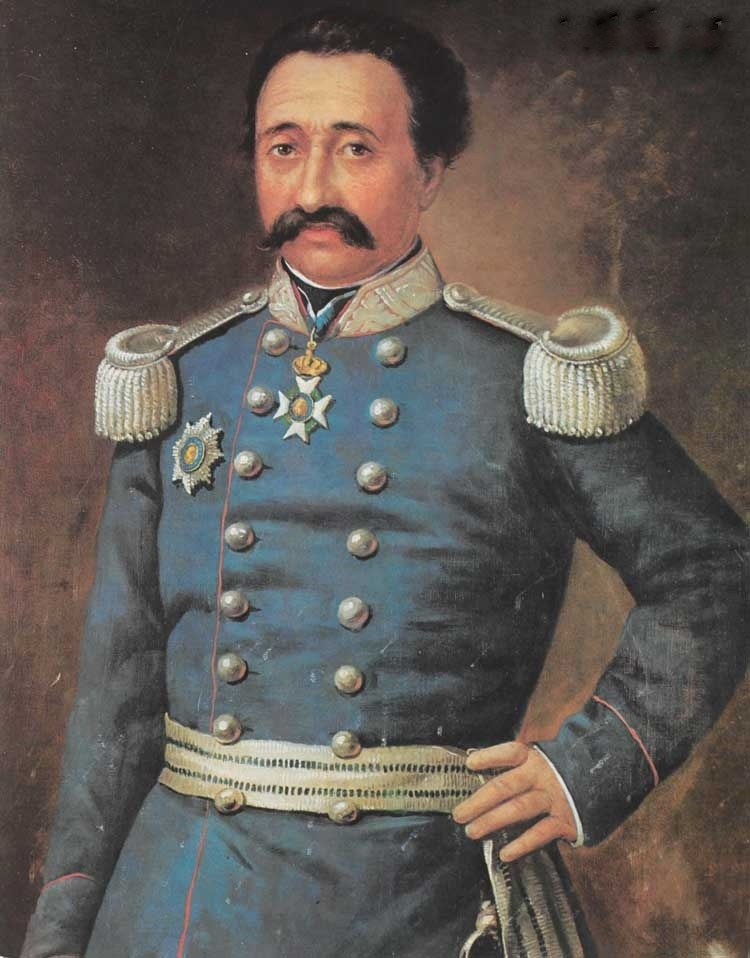
- Andreas Londos in uniform of a major general
- Born: c. 1786; Vostitsa, Ottoman Empire (now Aigio, Greece)
- Died: c. 1846; Athens, Kingdom of Greece
- Relatives: Sotirakis Londos (father)
- Military career
- Allegiance: First Hellenic Republic; Kingdom of Greece
- Branch: Hellenic Army
- Service years: 1821 - 1846
- Rank: Major general
- Conflicts: Greek War of Independence; Siege of Patras; Battle of Dervenakia; Greek Civil Wars; 3 September 1843 Revolution
- Awards: Grand Commander of the Order of the Redeemer
- Other work: Member of the Filiki Etaireia

Andreas S. Londos (Greek: Ανδρέας Λόντος, c. 1786–1846) was a Greek military leader and politician.

Born in Vostitsa in c. 1786 to Sotirakis Londos, he was initiated into the Filiki Eteria in 1818, and was one of the first military leaders to raise the banner of revolt in the Peloponnese during the Greek War of Independence.

On 26 January 1821, under the ruse of a land dispute between landowners, Londos and other leading landowners, primates and bishops of the Filiki Eteria, including Andreas Zaimis and Germanos of Patras, met Papaflessas at the Monastery of Archangels Michael and Gabriel in Vostitsa to discuss plans for an uprising against the Turks. At first, skeptical of Papaflessas's rhetoric for general uprising, Londos and the other leaders eventually raised the banner of independence on 10 March 1821, at the Monastery of Agia Lavra. It was after the Bey of Tripoli imprisoned and threatened to execute several leading Greek Bishops.

The flag raised by Andreas Londos in Patras at the outbreak of the Greek War of Independence.

On 23 March 1821, he and 400 Greek fighters marched on Vostitsa. Hearing rumours of a general insurrection, the Turks fled across the Gulf of Corinth and took refuge at Amfissa. The Greeks captured the town without a fight. Leaving 200 men as a garrison, Londos then marched on Patras to join the siege of the city's fortress.

In July 1822, at Akrata, a force of Greek fighters under Londos, Zaimis and Petimezas surrounded and attacked a group of 4,000 Turks marching to Patras after their defeat at the Battle of Dervenakia. Only a few were lucky to escape, while Yusuf Pasha sent ships to take them to Patras.

Andreas Londos along with his friend and ally, Andreas Zaimis were later embroiled in the political intrigues surrounding the claims of two factions to the legitimacy of government. At first, siding with the government (then led by Georgios Kountouriotis), Londos later joined the Peloponnesian leaders against the government of Ioannis Kolettis and was subsequently on the losing side of the civil war of 1824.

Following Greek independence, he became involved in the September 3 Movement that finally secured a constitution for the people of Greece.

Andreas Londos died in 1846 in Athens.
