= Alexandros Mavrokordatos =

Greek politician (1791–1865)

- Αλέξανδρος Μαυροκορδάτος
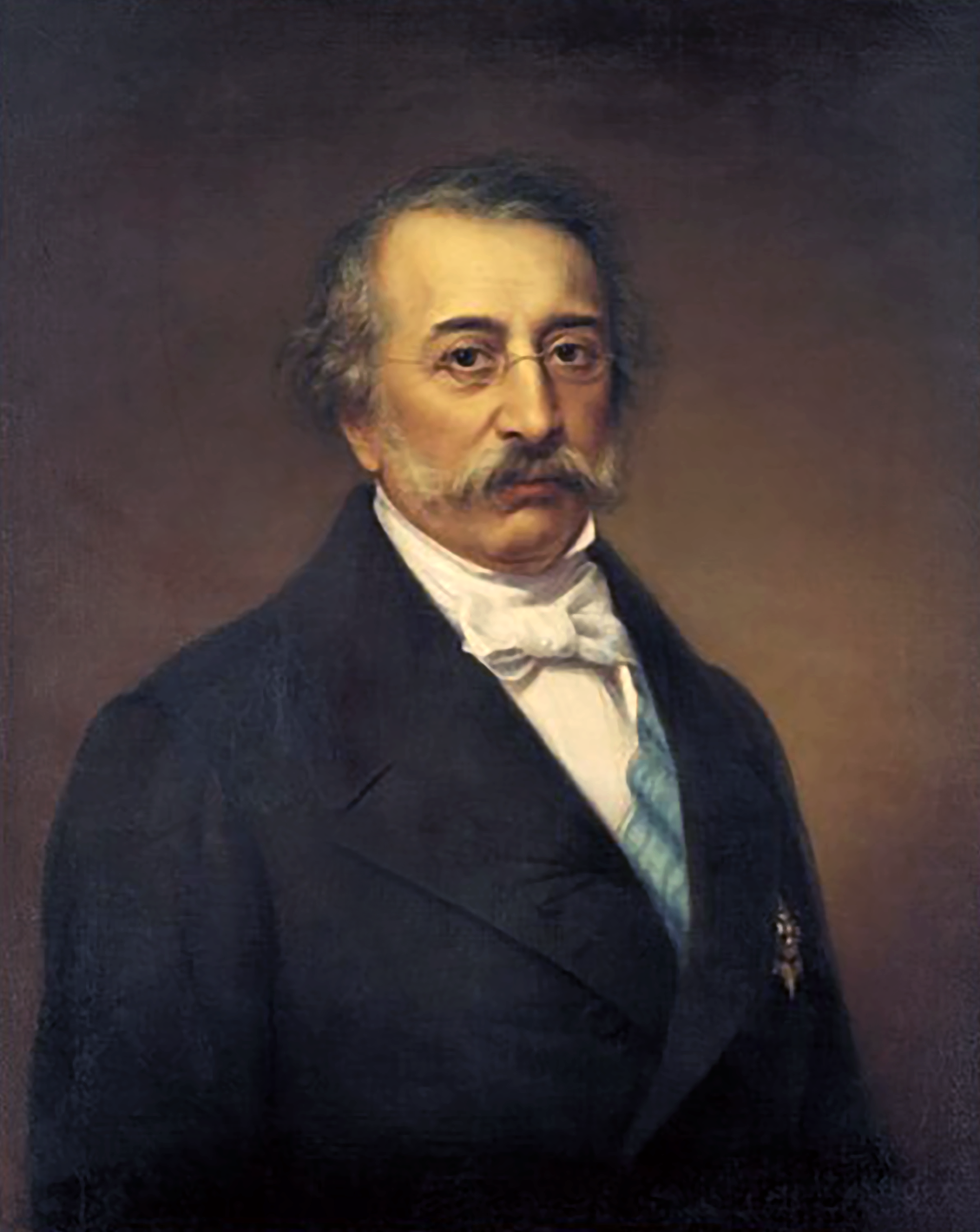

Prime Minister of Greece
- In office 16 May 1854 – 29 October 1855
- Monarch: Otto
- Preceded by: Antonios Kriezis
- Succeeded by: Dimitrios Voulgaris
- In office 30 March 1844 – 4 August 1844
- Monarch: Otto
- Preceded by: Konstantinos Kanaris
- Succeeded by: Ioannis Kolettis
- In office 24 June 1841 – 10 August 1841
- Monarch: Otto
- Preceded by: Direct Rule by Otto
- Succeeded by: Direct Rule by Otto
- In office 12 October 1833 – 31 May 1834
- Monarch: Otto
- Regent: Josef Ludwig von Armansperg
- Preceded by: Spyridon Trikoupis
- Succeeded by: Ioannis Kolettis

President of the Executive Provisional Administration of Greece
- In office 15 January 1822 – 26 April 1823
- Preceded by: Office established
- Succeeded by: Petrobey Mavromichalis

Personal details
- Born: 11 February 1791 Constantinople, Ottoman Empire (now Istanbul, Turkey)
- Died: 18 August 1865 (aged 74) Aegina, Kingdom of Greece
- Resting place: First Cemetery of Athens
- Party: English Party
- Spouse: Chariklia Argiropoulos
- Relations: Mavrokordatos family Cantacuzino family Caradja family
- Relatives: Alexander Mavrokordatos (great-great-grandfather); Nicholas Mavrocordatos (great-grandfather); Șerban Cantacuzino (great-grandfather); Nicholas Caradja (grandfather); John Caradja (uncle); Charilaos Trikoupis (nephew)
- Education: Phanar Greek Orthodox College
- Alma mater: University of Padua
- Occupation: Revolutionary; Politician

Military service
- Allegiance: First Hellenic Republic; Kingdom of Greece
- Branch/service: Hellenic Army
- Battles/wars: Greek War of Independence; Battle of Peta; First Siege of Missolonghi; Battle of Sphacteria

Alexandros Mavrokordatos (Greek: Αλέξανδρος Μαυροκορδάτος; 11 February 1791 – 18 August 1865) was a Greek statesman, diplomat, politician and member of the Mavrokordatos family of Phanariots.

== Biography ==
In 1812, Mavrokordatos went to the court of his uncle John Caradja, Hospodar of Wallachia, with whom he passed into exile in the Austrian Empire (1818), where he studied at the University of Padua. He was a member of the Filiki Eteria and was among the Phanariot Greeks who hastened to Morea on the outbreak of the War of Independence in 1821. At the time of the beginning of the revolution, Mavrokordatos was living in Pisa with the poet Percy Bysshe Shelley and his wife Mary Shelley, and upon hearing of the revolution, Mavrokordatos headed to Marseille to buy arms and a ship to take him back to Greece.

Mavrokordatos was a very wealthy, well educated man, fluent in seven languages, whose experience in ruling Wallachia led many to look towards him as a future leader of Greece. Unlike many of the Greek leaders, Mavrokordatos, who had lived in the West, preferred to wear Western clothing, and looked towards the West as a political model for Greece. The American philhellene Samuel Gridley Howe described Mavrokordatos:

"His manners are perfectly easy and gentlemanlike and though the first impression would be from his extreme politeness and continual smiles that he was a good-natured silly fop, yet one soon sees from the keen inquisitive glances which involuntarily escape from him, that he is concealing, under an almost childish lightness of manner, a close and accurate study of his visitor ... His friends ascribe every action to the most disinterested patriotism; but his enemies hesitate not to pronounce them all to have for their end his party or private interest ... Here, as is often the case, truth lies between the two extremes".

Mavrokordatos, a crafty, intelligent man was the best politician thrown up by the Greek struggle and he dominated directly or indirectly the various assemblies that endeavoured to establish a government for Greece. He was active in endeavouring to establish a regular government, and in January 1822 he was elected by the First National Assembly at Epidaurus as the "President of the Executive", making him in effect Greece's leader. The Epidaurus assembly was largely Mavrokordatos's triumph as he wrote the first Greek constitution and become the new national leader. Reflecting the fact that the Greek government had little power, Mavrokordatos was more interested in defending his power base in West Rumeli (Continental Greece), going first to the island of Hydra to secure the support of the Hydriots' warships and then to Missolonghi, where he supervised the building of the defensive works while using his wealth to create a network of patronage designed to secure him support from the western Rumeliot clans. Mavrokordatos did not play the part of a national leader, and had created a deliberately complicated constitution largely to ensure that no one else could become a successful leader while he was off securing his power base in West Rumeli. One observer commented about Mavrokordatos's tactics: "He imitates the cunning of the hedgehog who, they say, flattens his needles and makes himself thin to enter his burrow, and once inside fluffs them out again and becomes a ball of prickles to stop anyone else getting in".

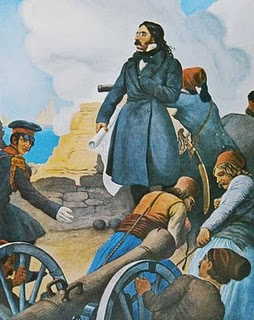
Alexandros Mavrokordatos by Peter von Hess

He commanded the advance of the Greeks into western Central Greece the same year, and suffered a serious defeat at Peta on 16 July, but retrieved this disaster somewhat by his successful resistance to the First Siege of Missolonghi (November 1822 – January 1823). At Peta, Mavokordatos wanted a victory by his philhellene units and his Greek soldiers trained by the German philhellene Karl von Normann-Ehrenfels to show the advantages of professional military training to the Greeks. Mavorkordatos appointed Normann-Ehrenfels, formerly a captain in the Württemberg army his chief of staff. At the Astros assembly in 1823, Mavrokordatos did not seek office again, but had himself appointed as general secretary of the Executive, which made him responsible for the flow of paperwork both to and from the Executive. In 1823, Mavokordatos supported the Senate in its dispute with the Executive dominated by supporters of his rival Theodoros Kolokotronis. In 1824, Mavrokordatos welcomed Lord Byron to Greece and tried to persuade him to lead an attack on Navpaktos. In 1824, Mavrokordatos backed a plot by the American philhellene George Jarvis and the Scottish philhellene Thomas Fenton to murder his rival Odysseas Androutsos and Androutsos's brother-in-law Edward John Trelawny.

Mavrokordatos's English sympathies brought him, in the subsequent strife of factions, into opposition to the "Russian" party headed by Demetrius Ypsilanti and Kolokotronis; and though he held the portfolio of foreign affairs for a short while under the presidency of Petrobey (Petros Mavromichalis), he was compelled to withdraw from affairs until February 1825, when he again became a Secretary of State. The landing of Ibrahim Pasha followed, and Mavrokordatos again joined the army, barely escaping capture in the disaster at Sphacteria, on 9 May 1825, on board the ship Ares.

After the fall of Missolonghi (22 April 1826) he went into retirement, until President John Capodistria made him a member of the committee for the administration of war material, a position he resigned in 1828. After Kapodistria's murder (9 October 1831) and the resignation of his brother and successor, Augustinos Kapodistrias (13 April 1832), Mavrokordatos became Minister of Finance. He was Vice-President of the National Assembly at Argos (July 1832), and was appointed by King Otto as his Minister of Finance, and in 1833 Premier.

From 1834 onwards, he was Greek envoy at Munich, Berlin, London and, after a short interlude again as Premier of Greece in 1841, he was appointed envoy to Constantinople. In 1843, after the 3 September uprising, he returned to Athens as Minister with no portfolio in the Metaxas cabinet, and from April to August 1844 was head of the government formed after the fall of the Russian party. Going into opposition, he distinguished himself by his violent attacks on the Kolettis government. In 1854-1855 he was again head of the government for a few months.

He died in Aegina on 18 August 1865.

== Family tree ==
Alexander Mavrocordatos
Nicholas Mavrocordatos
Soultana Chrysoskolaiou
Alexandros Mavrocordatos
Panayotakis Stavropoleos
Smaragda Stavropoleou
Nicholas Mavrocordatos
Constantin Cantacuzino
Șerban Cantacuzino
Helena Basarab
Smaragda Cantacouzena
Maria
Alexandros Mavrokordatos
Nicolae Caradja
Smaragda Caradja

Political offices
New title	President of the Executive; 15 January 1822 – 26 April 1823	Succeeded by Petrobey Mavromichalis
Preceded by Spyridon Trikoupis	Prime Minister of Greece; 12 October 1833 – 31 May 1834	Succeeded by Ioannis Kolettis
Preceded by King Otto	Prime Minister of Greece; 24 June – 10 August 1841	Succeeded by King Otto
Preceded by Konstantinos Kanaris	Prime Minister of Greece; 30 March – 4 August 1844	Succeeded by Ioannis Kolettis
Preceded by Antonios Kriezis	Prime Minister of Greece; 16 May 1854 – 29 September 1855	Succeeded by Dimitrios Voulgaris
