= Laskarina Bouboulina =

Greek naval commander (1771–1825)

Rear Admiral Laskarina Bouboulina
- Λασκαρίνα Μπουμπουλίνα; Laskarina Bouboulina
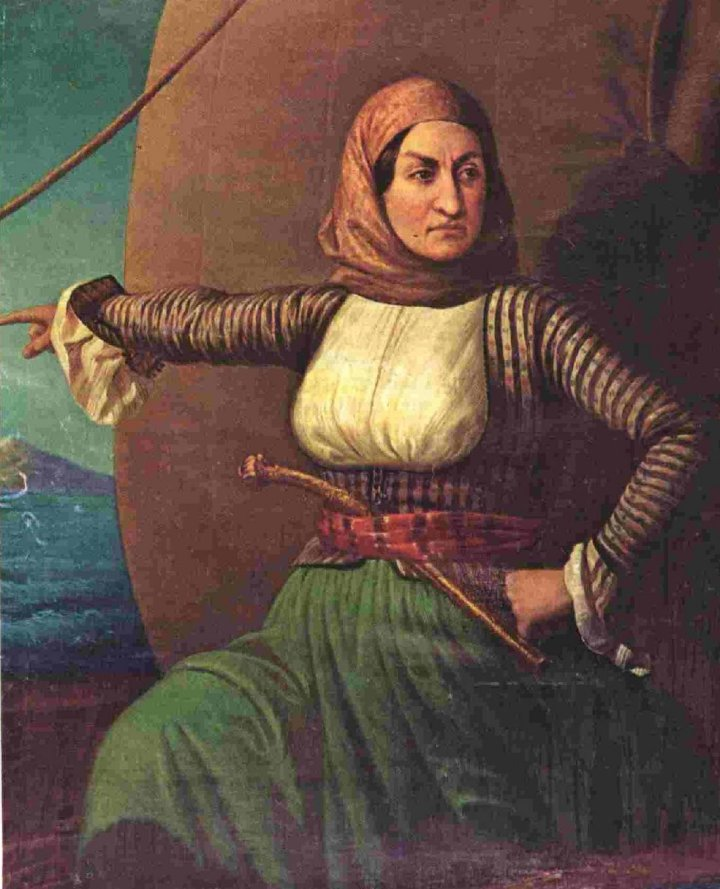
- Oil painting of Bouboulina; National Historical Museum, Athens
- Born: Λασκαρίνα Πινότση; Laskarina Pinotsi; 1771; Constantinople, Ottoman Empire (now Turkey)
- Died: 22 May 1825 (aged 53–54); Spetses, Eyalet of the Archipelago, Ottoman Empire (now Greece)
- Spouse(s): Dimitrios Yiannouzas; Dimitrios Bouboulis
- Children: Yiannis Yiannouzas; Georgios Yiannouzas; Eleni Boubouli
- Relatives: Panos Kolokotronis (son-in-law); Lela Karagianni (great-granddaughter)
- Military career
- Allegiance: (Greece) First Hellenic Republic
- Branch: Hellenic Navy
- Rank: Captain (Revolutionary Navy); Rear Admiral (Posthumous, Hellenic Navy); Admiral (Posthumous, Russian Navy)
- Nicknames: Καπετάνισσα; Kapetanissa; Κυρά; Kyra
- Commands: Agamemnon
- Conflicts: Greek War of Independence X; Siege of Nafplion; Siege of Monemvasia
- Other work: Member of the Filiki Etaireia

Laskarina Pinotsi, commonly known as Bouboulina (Greek: Λασκαρίνα (Μπουμπουλίνα) Πινότση; (Note: Laskarína (Bouboulína) Pinótsi, pronounced [laskaˈrina bubuˈlina piˈnotsi]) 1771 – 22 May 1825), was a Greek naval commander in the Greek War of Independence in 1821, considered one of the first women to attain the rank of admiral. (Note: There are some earlier historical precedents, like Isabel Barreto in the Spanish Navy.)

Bouboulina was born in Constantinople in 1771. Her father was Stavrianos Pinotsis, an Arvanite from Hydra and her mother was Skevo Kokkini, descendant of the Byzantine Kokkinis family. During her youth, she developed an interest in sailing which was facilitated by her stepfather's liberal attitude to education. She was widowed twice, inheriting a considerable sum of money from her second husband. She later allegedly joined the Filiki Etaireia secret society which sought to achieve Greek independence from the Ottoman Empire, being among the few women to do so. Following the outbreak of the Greek War of Independence she commanded a fleet of Spetsiot ships which contributed to several campaigns, most notably the siege of Nafplion.

Following the defeat of her faction in the Greek civil war in 1824, Bouboulina was briefly imprisoned and expelled to Spetses. She was killed on 22 May 1825, during the course of a family feud. A few days after her death, the Russian Navy awarded her with the honorary title of Admiral, and in 2018 she was awarded the honorary title of Rear Admiral by the Greek Navy.

== Biography ==
=== Early life ===
Bouboulina was born in 1771 in Constantinople. She was the daughter of Stavrianos Pinotsis, a captain from Hydra island, and his wife Skevo (Paraskevi) Kokkini, descendant of the notable Byzantine Kokkinis family; a large part of this family lived in the island of Zakynthos. From her father's side, she originated from the local native Arvanite population of the island of Hydra. (Note: Some scholars however dispute this, and argue that Bouboulina didn't speak Arvanitika originally but learned it later in her life by her first husband and through socializing with the Albanian-speakers of the place she lived. Researcher of the history of the Kokkinis family, Antonios Kokkinis, claims that neither of Bouboulina's parents had Albanian origin.) The Ottomans had imprisoned Pinotsis for his part in the failed Orlov revolt of 1769–1770 against the Ottoman rule shortly after the birth of his daughter. Her father died soon afterward and the mother and child returned to Hydra. Bouboulina's family moved to Spetses when she was four years old. Her mother later married Spetsiot Dimitrios Lazarou-Orlov. Lazarou had previously double-barrelled his family name to Lazarou-Orlov in order to commemorate his participation in the Orlov revolt and declare his loyalty to Russia. Bouboulina grew up alongside her half-siblings. During her youth she enjoyed swimming, fishing, riding on horseback, sailing and singing klepht songs. Her stepfather encouraged her interest in sailing beyond the accepted social norms of the time, a decision which has been attributed to his admiration for Russian empress Catherine the Great. Her home's library contained many books from Enlightenment era writers including those of Friedrich von Schiller and Voltaire.

She married captain Dimitrios Yiannouzas with whom she had three children; Yiannouzas drowned during a battle against Algerian pirates. She later remarried the wealthy shipowner and captain Dimitrios Bouboulis, taking his surname. Bouboulis likewise drowned in a battle against Algerian pirates on 10 May 1811 off the shore of Lampedusa. Bouboulina took over his fortune and his trading business, acquiring shares in other Spetsiot ships. She traveled to Constantinople in 1814. The Ottomans were aware of the fortune Bouboulina had inherited from her husband and were seeking a premise to seize it in 1816. The Ottomans argued that Bouboulis' assets should be forfeited since he had fought on the Russian side during the last Russo-Turkish war. Bouboulina returned to Constantinople in 1816 to argue her case, enlisting the help of the Russian ambassador and the Valide Sultan. The latter was able to convince the Ottoman officials to allow Bouboulina to retain her property.

Bouboulina was visited by nationalist priest Papaflessas in 1818. Following her meeting with Papaflessas, she made her third visit to Constantinople. Bouboulina joined the Filiki Etaireia, an underground organization that was preparing Greece for revolution against Ottoman rule. She would have been one of a few women, but she is not named in historical members lists. Upon her return to Spetses, she ordered the construction of a ship that was larger than Ottoman regulations would allow. The Ottomans dispatched admiral Hussein to ensure Bouboulina adhered to Ottoman law. Bouboulina proceeded to bribe Hussein, who then signed a report indicating that the ship was a long range Spetsiot trade ship. Agamemnon was armed with 18 cannons and went on to become the first warship in modern-day Greece.

=== Greek War of Independence ===
Upon the outbreak of the Greek War of Independence, Bouboulina sailed on the Agamemnon, which was commanded by her son Yiannis Yiannouzas, to Nafplion, along with another ship commanded by her half brother Manolis Lazarou-Orlov, imposing a naval blockade on the city on 4 April 1821. Bouboulina and Staikos Staikopoulos then appealed to the Spetsiots who dispatched seven more ships to assist in the siege. Bouboulina commanded great respect among the revolutionaries who nicknamed her Kapetanissa (Captain) and Kyra (Lady). On 10 April, the besieged Ottomans exploited the fact that the Greek sentries were celebrating Orthodox Easter, breaking through the siege. Bouboulina then disembarked at Myloi and traveled to Argos on horseback, supplying the local rebels with money and ammunition. In Argos, Bouboulina participated in a conference of local military commanders and kodjabashis, where the Greeks decided to resume the siege of Nafplion.

The siege of Nafplion continued until the rebels became aware of the Kehaya Bey's force which had reached Corinth and was heading to relieve the siege. Yiannis Yiannouzas then assembled troops from Argos, Spetses and Kranidi in order to check the Kehaya Bey's advance and was killed in May in the ensuing battle outside Argos. Bouboulina subsequently traveled to the battlefield in order to collect her son's remains who was beheaded in the aftermath of the battle. According to Dutch consul Edouard Taitbout de Marigny, she personally executed three Ottoman prisoners during her son's funeral ceremony. After failing to capture Argos or burning it (according to Kolokotronis), the Kehaya Bey reinforced Nafplion's garrison and departed for Tripolitsa. Bouboulina then resumed the naval blockade of Nafplion. In May 1821, she blockaded Monemvasia with the Agamemnon, while the rest of the Spetsiot fleet remained off the shore of Nafplion. (Note: According to 19c. naval historian Anastasios K. Orlandos however, the Agamemnon was part of a six ships Spetsiot squadron that left Spetses on May 6 to operate in the gulf of Corinth and was still in Galaxidi in June 18 (Nautika vol 1 pp. 140)) The garrison of Monemvasia surrendered on 25 July, at the same time another of her ships (Note: the Agamemnon itself, according to Orlandos (Nautika vol 1 pp. 140)) resupplied Galaxidi. Rumors of Bouboulina's exploits spread beyond Greece and many foreign philhellenes sought to meet her. During one such meeting in Astros, one foreign volunteer (Maurice Persat) showed her a lithograph depicting her which he had purchased in Paris. The highly romanticized and inaccurate depiction caused Bouboulina to burst out laughing.

In September 1821, she arrived in Tripolitsa which was besieged by the troops of general Theodoros Kolokotronis. The Ottomans were on the brink of surrender and were requesting a safe exit of the local officials along with their harems and release of a number of prisoners. On 18 September, Kolokotronis convened a meeting of his officers to discuss the terms offered by their adversaries. Bouboulina took an active part in the negotiations, intervening to save the lives of the women from Hursit's harem upon Valide Sultan's request. Kolokotronis allowed only the officials of Albanian origin to depart the city. Three days later the city fell to the Greeks who massacred the local Muslim population and looted their properties. Bouboulina was subsequently accused on taking part in the looting (which was a common practice in both Greek and Ottoman warfare of the period). After the fall of Tripolitsa, Bouboulina returned to Nafplion to personally oversee its blockade.

She participated to the naval section of a failed assault on Nauplia in December 1821, where she distinguished herself by her courage. Her biographers don't provide details of her activities during the subsequent phases of the siege of Nauplia: she is not mentioned as having taken part in the events of the Expedition of Dramali which resulted in another break of the siege of Nauplia, nor to the battle of Nauplia in September 1822.

On 22 November 1822, (Note: 30 November, according to accepted historiography) the Ottomans surrendered the Palamidi fortress. On 3 December 1822, the Ottoman population of Nafplion was allowed to safely depart for Asia Minor, surrendering the city to the Greeks. Bouboulina was appointed to one of the commissions tasked with redistributing the property of Nafplio's Muslim population, a position she abused for personal gain.

Bouboulina then moved into a house in Nafplion. Soon afterward she gave her daughter Eleni Boubouli in marriage to Kolokotronis' son Panos Kolokotronis. Panos Kolokotronis was appointed the commander of Nafplion's garrison, making Bouboulina one of the region's most powerful people.

Bouboulina stayed in Nafplion until the civil war of 1824 during which she supported the faction of Kolokotronis. She and Panos Kolokotronis were blockaded in the city by pro-governmental forces from 8/20 March 1824, at sea by Miaoulis with two brigs and two gunboats, and on the land by 500 Kranidiots and Poriots. After the agreement that put an end to the first civil war, P. Kolokotronis eventually surrendered the fortress on June 7/19 and joined his father in Karytaina Discussions about Bouboulina's treatment illustrated the growing dissent between members of the victorious governmental faction: the president Koundouriotis insisted on her expulsion from Nafplion, while Zaimis and Londos interceded in her favor, to no avail.: her house in Nafplion was confiscated and she departed for Spetses. She was imprisoned for some time on false charges of witchcraft and heresy by her islander political opponents before being eventually released.

On 22 November 1824, during the second civil war, Panos Kolokotronis was either (according to conflicting interpretations) murdered or killed in battle. by pro-governmental troops. Although Theodoros Kolokotronis wanted to give her in marriage to someone of his choice, Bouboulina secretly took her daughter Eleni back, leaving her dowry behind, perhaps to marry her to the Northern chieftain Theodore Grivas in order to secure an alliance with him, or because the two had already an extramarital affair After the final defeat of his faction in the second civil war, Kolokotronis was imprisoned in February 1825.

=== Death in feud ===
Eugenia Koutsi and Bouboulina's son Georgios Yiannouzas had eloped, after the former was forced by her family to betroth a man she disliked. Bouboulina had supported her son's decision. On 22 May 1825, armed members of the Koutsis family went to Bouboulina's house, believing that the couple was hiding inside. When Bouboulina confronted them from the balcony, she was shot and killed by one of the armed men. According to Kalomoira Argyriou-Koumpi, the motive for her assassination may have not only been revenge for the honor of the Koutsis family, but also from unease caused by her extraordinary behavior for a woman of her time.

== Legacy ==
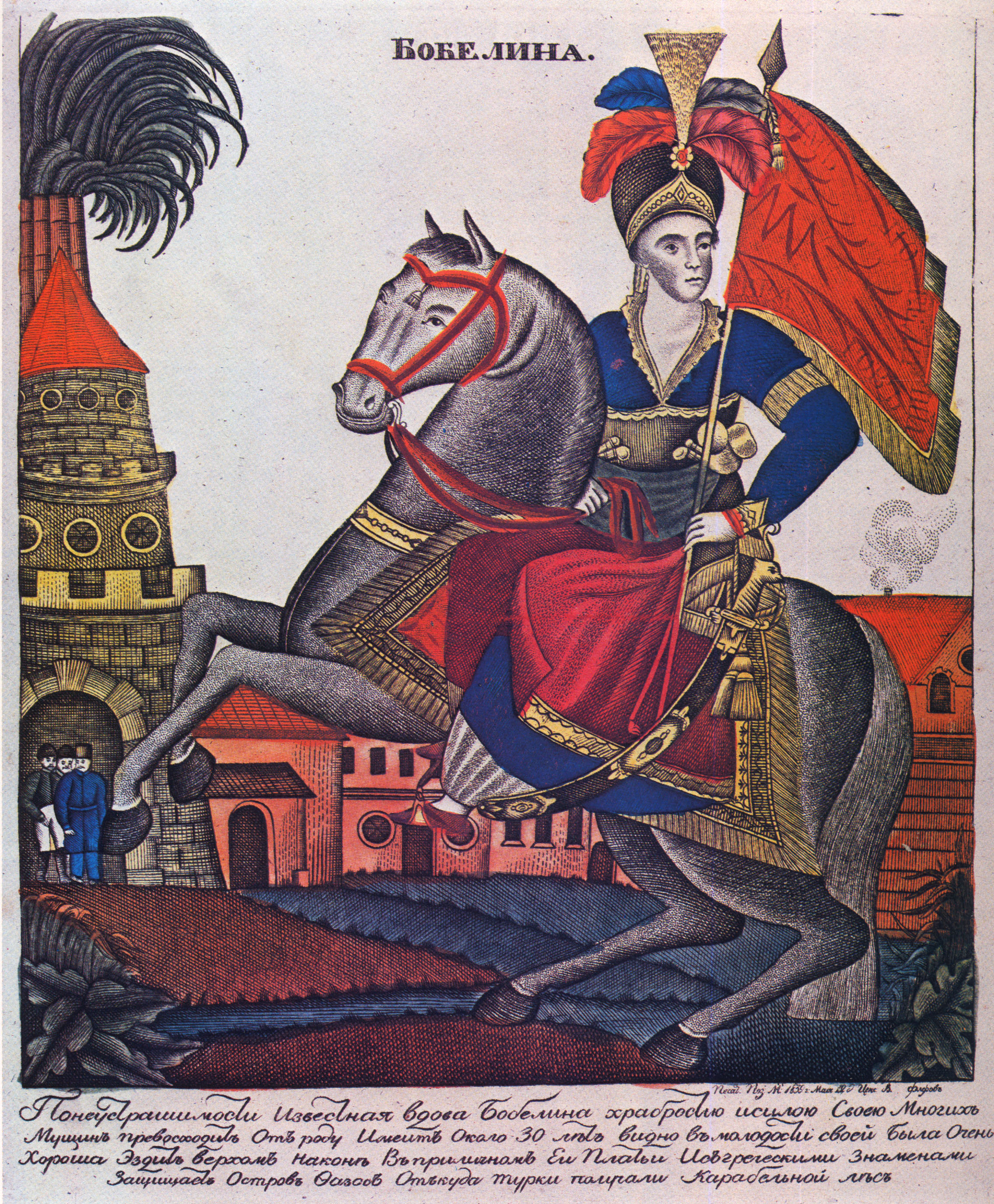
"Bobelina", a 19th-century Russian lubok

A few days after her death, a Russian delegation presented her with the honorary rank of Admiral of the Russian Navy granted by Tsar Alexander I of Russia, making her perhaps the first woman in world naval history to hold this title. This statement has been circulated by her descendants (who maintain a museum dedicated to her), but no documentary evidence has been provided by anyone to support this claim, and Russian encyclopedias and naval reference books deny the existence of a female admiral in the Russian Empire. In 2018 she was granted the title of Rear Admiral (expressed in Greek as Υποναύαρχος) in the Hellenic Navy.

Bouboulina was depicted on the reverse of both the Greek ₯50 banknote of 1978 and the ₯1 coin between 1988–2001. A statue of Bouboulina sculpted by Natalia Mela-Konstantinidou is located at Spetses. A bust of Bouboulina created by Lazaros Lameras is located in Tinos while a copy of it is hosted in the Pedion tou Areos. A bust of her also exists at the junction of Bouboulinas str. and Emmanouil Sofroni str. in Nafplion. The Greek drama film, Bouboulina, starring Irene Papas in the titular role was released in 1959, it was directed and written by Kostas Andritsos. A documentary film based on a fictionalized account of her life and deeds, The Brave Stepped Back: The Life and Times of Laskarina Bouboulina, was released in 2005, debuting at the Armata Festival in Spetses.

Lela Karagianni (sometimes spelled Karayanni or Carayannis), leader of the Greek Resistance cell Bouboulina during the Second World War, was her great-granddaughter.

In Sid Meier's Civilization VI, players can recruit Bouboulina as a Great Admiral.

== Bibliography ==
- Aliberty, Soteria (1933). Αι Ηρωίδες της Ελληνικής Επαναστάσεως, Athens
- Angelomatis-Tsougarakis, Helen (2008). "Women in the Greek War of Independence". In Mazower, Mark (ed.). Networks of power in modern Greece. Columbia University Press. ISBN 978-0231701037.
- Kalogeropoulos Householder, April (2006). The Life and Legacy of Laskarina Bouboulina: Feminist Alternatives to Documentary Filmmaking Practices (PhD thesis). University of Maryland.
- Papadimitriou, Lydia (2015). "Heroines of the 1821 Revolution in Greek Cinema: Bouboulina (1959) and Manto Mavrogenous (1971)". Eroi şi antieroi balcanici/Balkan Heroes and Anti-Heroes, Editura Fundaţiei Culturale Est-Vest, Bucureşti: 43–48.
- Xiradaki, Koula (1995). Γυναίκες του 21 [Women of 21] (in Greek). Athens: Dodoni. ISBN 960-248-781-X.
