= Panos Kolokotronis =

Greek revolutionary (1800–1824)

- Πάνος Κολοκοτρώνης
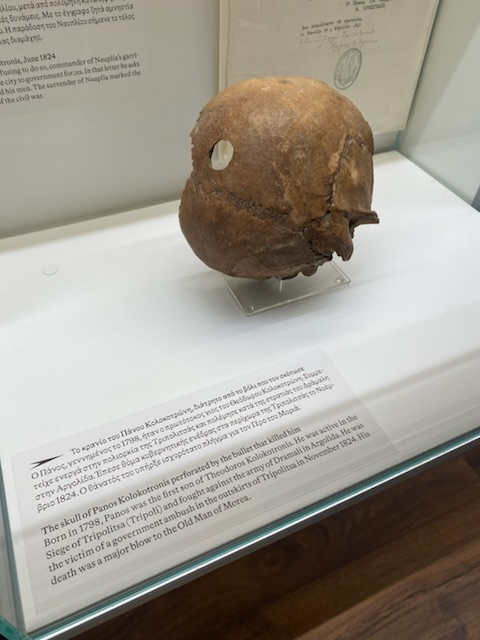
- Skull of Panos Kolokotronis, National Historical Museum, Athens
- Born: 1800; Zakynthos, Septinsular Republic (now Greece)
- Died: 3 December 1824 (aged 23–24); Thana, Arcadia, Greece)
- Spouse: Eleni Boubouli
- Relatives: Konstantinos Kolokotronis (grandfather); Theodoros Kolokotronis (father); Gennaios Kolokotronis (brother); Nikitas Stamatelopoulos (cousin)
- Military career
- Allegiance: (Greece) First Hellenic Republic
- Branch: Hellenic Army
- Conflicts: Greek War of Independence; Siege of Tripolitsa; Battle of Valtetsi; Battle of Lalas; Battle of Dervenakia; Greek Civil Wars †
- Other work: Member of the Filiki Etaireia

Panos Kolokotronis (Greek: Πάνος Κολοκοτρώνης; died 3 December 1824) was the eldest son of the Greek General Theodoros Kolokotronis and his mother was Aikaterini Karousou (Greek: Αικατερίνη Καρούσου). He was born on the island of Zakynthos in 1800, while his father was serving there as a Major in the British Infantry. He fought along with his father in the Greek War of Independence and distinguished himself in many battles.

In 1822, he married Eleni, the daughter of Laskarina Bouboulina.

On 3 December 1824, during the second civil war, he was murdered in an ambush close to the village of Thana, Arcadia, Greece, by order of the revolutionary government.

His skull is on display in the National Historical Museum in Athens.

== See also ==
- Theodoros Kolokotronis
- Gennaios Kolokotronis
