= Greek civil wars of 1823–1825 =

Civil conflicts in Greece

The Greek civil wars of 1823–1825 occurred alongside the Greek War of Independence. The conflict had both political and regional dimensions, as it pitted the Roumeliotes, who lived in mainland Greece, and shipowners from the Islands, primarily Hydra island, against the Peloponnesians or Moreotes. It divided the nation, and seriously weakened the military preparedness of the Greek forces in the face of the oncoming Egyptian intervention in the conflict.

== Background ==
By the end of March 1821, Peloponnese was in open revolt against the Ottoman Empire and by October 1821 the Greeks under Theodoros Kolokotronis had already captured Kalamata and Tripolitsa. After the fall of Kalamata, the Messenian Senate, the first of the Greeks' local governing councils, held its inaugural session. At almost the same time, the Achean Directorate was summoned in Patras. With the initiative of the Messenian Senate, a Peloponnesian assembly convened, and elected on May 26 a Senate. Assemblies convened also in Central Greece (November 1821) under the leadership of two Phanariots: Alexandros Mavrokordatos in the western part, and Theodoros Negris in the eastern part. These assemblies adopted two local statutes, the Charter of Western Continental Greece and the Legal Order of Eastern Continental Greece. The statutes provided for the creation of two local administrative organs in Central Greece, an Areopagus in the east, and a Senate in the west. The three local statutes were recognized by the First National Assembly, but were later dissolved by the Second National Assembly.

The First National Assembly was formed at Epidaurus in late December 1821, consisted almost exclusively of Peloponnesian notables. The Assembly composed the first Greek Constitution and appointed the members of an executive and a legislative body that were to govern the liberated territories. Mavrokordatos saved the office of president of the executive for himself, while Ypsilantis, who had called for the Assembly, was elected president of the legislative body, a place of no significance. Military leaders and representative of Filiki Eteria were marginalized, but gradually Kolokotronis' political influence grew, and he soon managed to control, along with the captains he influenced, the Peloponnesian Senate, which was not dissolved by the National Assembly. The Senate actually governed Peloponnese, while the central government was too weak to exercise its power. Seeing the impasse and the growing power of the Peloponnesian captains, Mavrokordatos and the Hydriots proposed the dissolution of the Senate and its incorporation into the National Assembly. Mavromichalis accepted the proposal, but the military leaders rejected it. After the rejection of the proposal, the central administration tried to marginalize Kolokotronis. In November 1822, the central administration promulgated the law for the election of representative for the new National Assembly, but Kolokotronis defied the law, and declared that the Peloponnese will organize its own assembly for the elections of the new members of the Senate.

== First civil war ==
First Greek Civil War
- Part of the Greek War of Independence
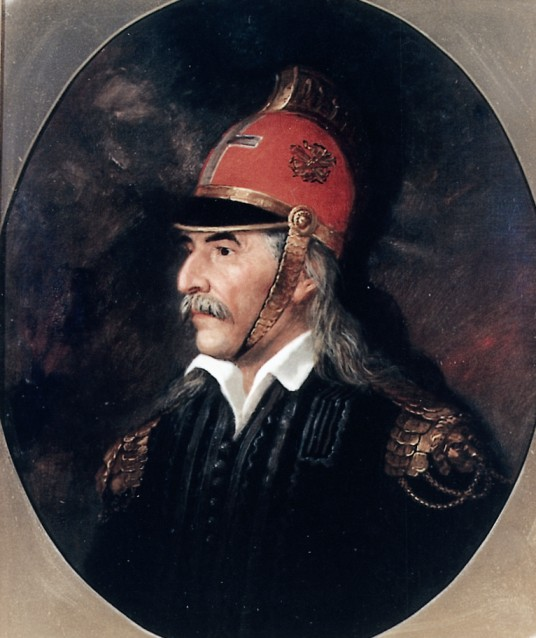
- Theodoros Kolokotronis
| Date | Autumn 1823 – June 1824 |
| Location | Peloponnese, First Hellenic Republic |
| Result | Partial victory of the military leaders: Agreement between the two factions |

Belligerents
| (Greece) First Hellenic Republic Most of the primates | Military leaders Supporters of Philiki Etaireia |

Commanders and leaders
| Alexandros Mavrokordatos; Andreas Londos | Theodoros Kolokotronis; Petros Mavromichalis |

The provisional government decided that the National Assembly would take place in Epidaurus (taken meanwhile in the end of December 1822), and asked Kolokotronis to return the fort to the government. Kolokotronis refused, and proposed that the Assembly take place in Nafplion, while the city remained under his control. His stance divided his supporters and weakened him politically. Most of the members of the Peloponnesian Senate obeyed the decisions of the government, and the captains were forced to negotiate their participation in the Assembly. Finally, the Second National Assembly was gathered in March 1823 in Astros. Central governance was strengthened at the expense of regional bodies, a new constitution was voted, and new members were elected for the executive and legislative bodies.

Trying to coax the military leaders, the central administration proposed to Kolokotronis to participate in the executive body as vice-president. Kolokotronis accepted, but his actions caused a serious crisis when he prevented Mavrokordatos, who had been elected president of the legislative body, from assuming his position. His attitude towards Mavrokordatos caused the rage of the members of the legislative body, which was controlled by the Roumeliotes and the Hydriots. Both Kolokotronis and his president in the executive, Petros Mavromichalis, were harshly criticized by the members of the legislative body. The crisis culminated when the legislative overturned the executive and dismissed its members. Kolokotronis and most of the Peloponnesian notables and captains supported Mavromichalis, who remained president of his executive in Tripolitsa. However, a second executive, supported by the islanders, the Roumeliotes, some Achaean notables—Andreas Zaimis and Andreas Londos were the most prominent—and others, such as Papaflessas, was formed at Kranidi with Kountouriotis as president.

Actual fighting started in early March 1824, when the government asked Panos Kolokotronis to surrender Nafplion. Panos Kolokotronis refused and the government decided to besiege the city. On 22 March 1824, the forces of the new executive besieged Tripolitsa, and after two weeks of fighting an agreement was reached between Kolokotronis, from the one side, and Londos and Zaimis, from the other. The old executive was finally dissolved, and Kolokotronis fled the city. On 22 May the first phase of the civil war officially ended. Most members of the new executive however wanted a complete victory over their opponents, and were thus displeased by the moderate terms of the agreement that Londos and Zaimis brokered. Kolokotronis and Mavromichalis retreated, but they intended to regroup their forces and launch a new offensive. Additionally, Panos Kolokotronis agreed to surrender Nafplion only to Londos and Zaimis, an arrangement which again resulted in the intensification of the mistrust of the government towards the two Achaean notables, who were still allies of the central administration.

== Second civil war ==
Second Greek Civil War
- Part of the Greek War of Independence
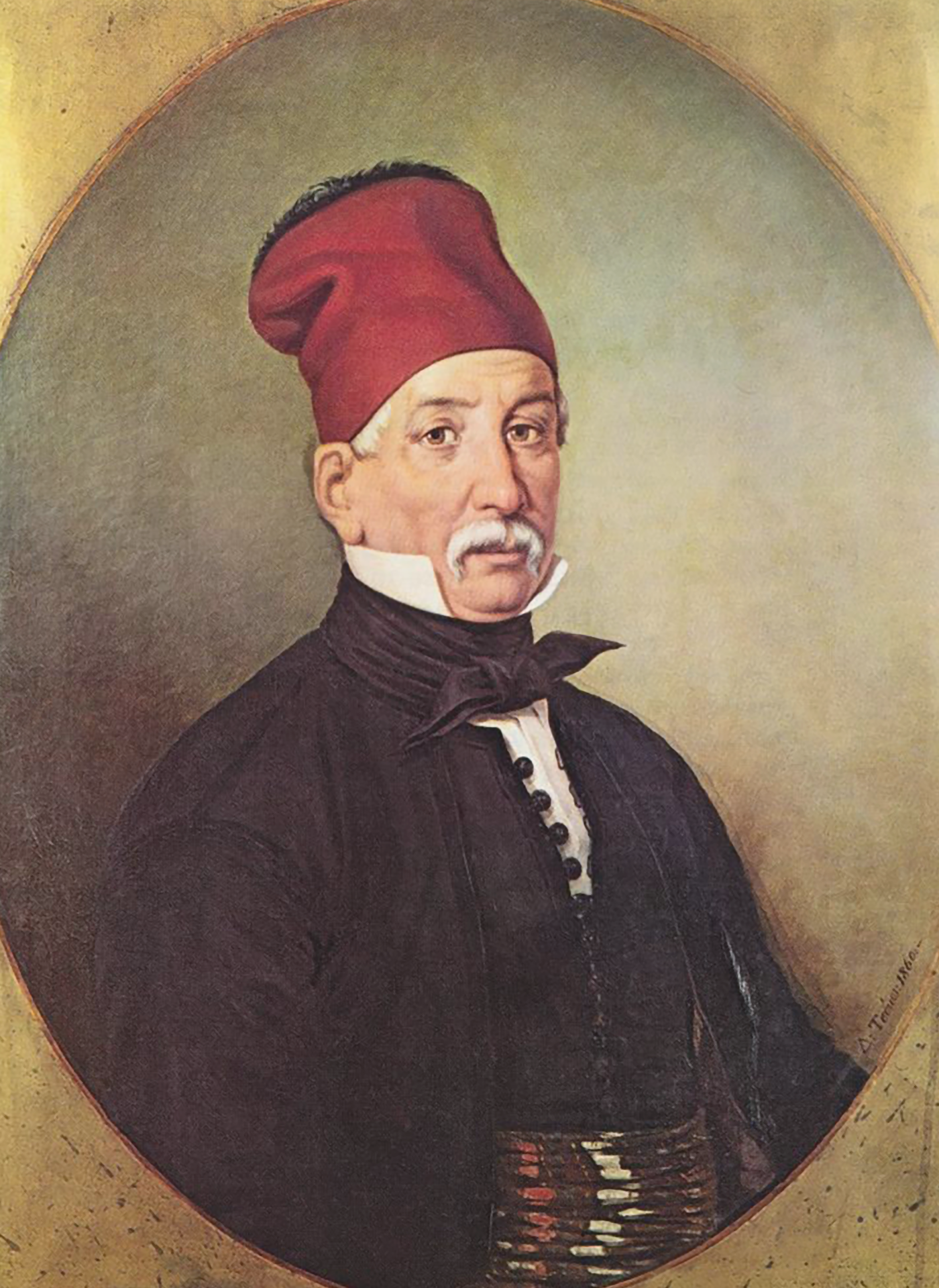
- Georgios Kountouriotis
| Date | October 1824 – February 1825 |
| Location | Peloponnese, First Hellenic Republic |
| Result | Victory of the government: Imprisonment of Kolokotronis |

Belligerents
| (Greece) First Hellenic Republic; Roumeliotes; Hydriotes | Moreotes |

Commanders and leaders
| Georgios Kountouriotis; Ioannis Kolettis; Alexandros Mavrokordatos; Yannis Makriyannis | Theodoros Kolokotronis; Andreas Londos; Kanellos Deligiannis |

During this period the two first installments of the English loan had arrived, an event which strengthened the position of the government; but the infighting was not yet over. Zaimis and the other Peloponnesians who supported Kountouriotis came into conflict with the executive body when they were excluded from most government posts after the elections of 3 October 1824. Prominent persons from both sides proposed negotiations and the convening of a new National Assembly, but most members of the executive (especially Papaflessas and Ioannis Kolettis) wished the complete subjugation of the Peloponnesians.

The military conflict resumed when Kolokotronis roused the residents of Tripolitsa against the local tax collectors of the government. Papaflessas and Yannis Makriyannis failed to suppress the rebellion, which spread throughout the Peloponnese, but neither Kolokotronis nor Londos or Zaimis attempted to occupy Tripolitsa. Kolokotronis remained inactive for some period because of an additional reason: he could not overcome the death of his son, Panos, killed by his opponents. While the Peloponnesians were undecided about their further moves, the government regrouped its armies, which now consisted mainly of Roumeliotes and Souliots, several of whom previously served the Peloponnesians. The plan of the government was implemented by Kolettis, who ordered two bodies of Roumeliotes and Souliots to invade the Peloponnese. On 23 November, the first of these bodies under Gouras occupied Corinth and raided the province. The second body under Georgios Karaiskakis, Kitsos Tzavelas and others, attacked in Achaea Londos and Zaimis, who retreated and then fled to Kalamos. In January 1825, a Roumeliote force, led by Kolettis himself, raided once again Peloponnese, and arrested Kolokotronis, Deligiannis' family and others. The next month Mavrokordatos assumed the position of the president of the executive. In May 1825, under the pressure of the Egyptian intervention of Ibrahim Pasha, those imprisoned were released and granted amnesty.

== Sources ==
- Dakin, Douglas (1973). The Greek struggle for independence, 1821-1833. University of California Press. ISBN 0-520-02342-0.
- Dimitropoulos, Dimitris (2009). "Kolokotronis during the Infighting". Theodoros Kolokotronis (in Greek). Athens: Ta Nea. ISBN 978-960-469-707-6.
- Koliopoulos, John S.; Veremis, Thanos M. (2004). "A Regime to Suit the Nation". Greece: the Modern Sequel. C. Hurst & Co. Publishers. ISBN 1-85065-463-8.
- Rotzokos, Nikos (2003). "The Civil Wars". In Panagiotopoulos, Vassilis (ed.). History of Modern Hellenism (in Greek). Vol. III. Athens: Ellinika Grammata. pp. 143–170. ISBN 960-406-540-8.
