= Kanellos Deligiannis =

Greek politician (1780–1862)

- Κανέλλος Δεληγιάννης
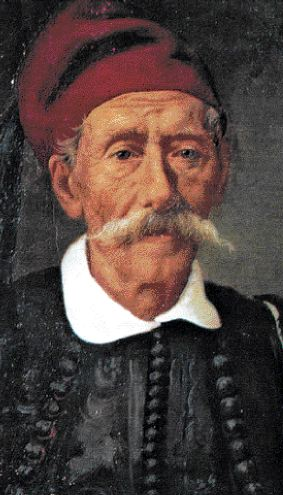
- A portrait of Deligiannis

Speaker of the Hellenic Parliament
- In office 1844–1845
- Monarch: Otto

Personal details
- Born: c. 1780 Langadia, Morea Eyalet, Ottoman Empire (now Greece)
- Died: 18 September 1862 Athens, Kingdom of Greece

Military service
- Allegiance: (Greece) First Hellenic Republic
- Branch/service: Hellenic Army
- Battles/wars: Greek War of Independence; Siege of Tripolitsa; Battle of Peta; First Siege of Missolonghi; Greek Civil Wars

Kanellos Deligiannis (Greek: Κανέλλος Δεληγιάννης; c. 1780–1862) was a Greek magnate from the Morea and the son of Ioannis Deligiannis. He was one of the main organizers of the Greek War of Independence and a politician in the independent Kingdom of Greece.

== Biography ==
He was born in Langadia, Gortynia, and was a son of one of the most important magnates in the Peloponnese (Morea), Ioannis Deligiannis. Due to the prominence of his family in the area, he played an important role in the Greek Revolution.

He fought at Tripolitsa, Peta, Missolonghi, and elsewhere. During the Greek civil wars of 1824–1825, he joined with many chiefs of the Peloponnese and Hydra and convinced Theodoros Kolokotronis to join them by offering his daughter in marriage to one of Kolokotronis' sons. In the second round of the civil war, he was imprisoned along with Kolokotronis by the provisional government of Georgios Kountouriotis. After Independence, he became a speaker of the Greek Parliament in 1844–1845.

Deligiannis also wrote memoirs, which are considered controversial, as they seek to justify his father's pro-Turkish stance as being beneficial for the Greek population. His memoirs also portray the rivalries of the various groups and the leading families of the Peloponnese before and during the Revolution.

He died in 1862.
