= Siege of Tripolitsa =

1821 battle and massacre in the Greek War of Independence

Coordinates: 37.5167°N 22.3833°E

- Part of the Greek War of Independence
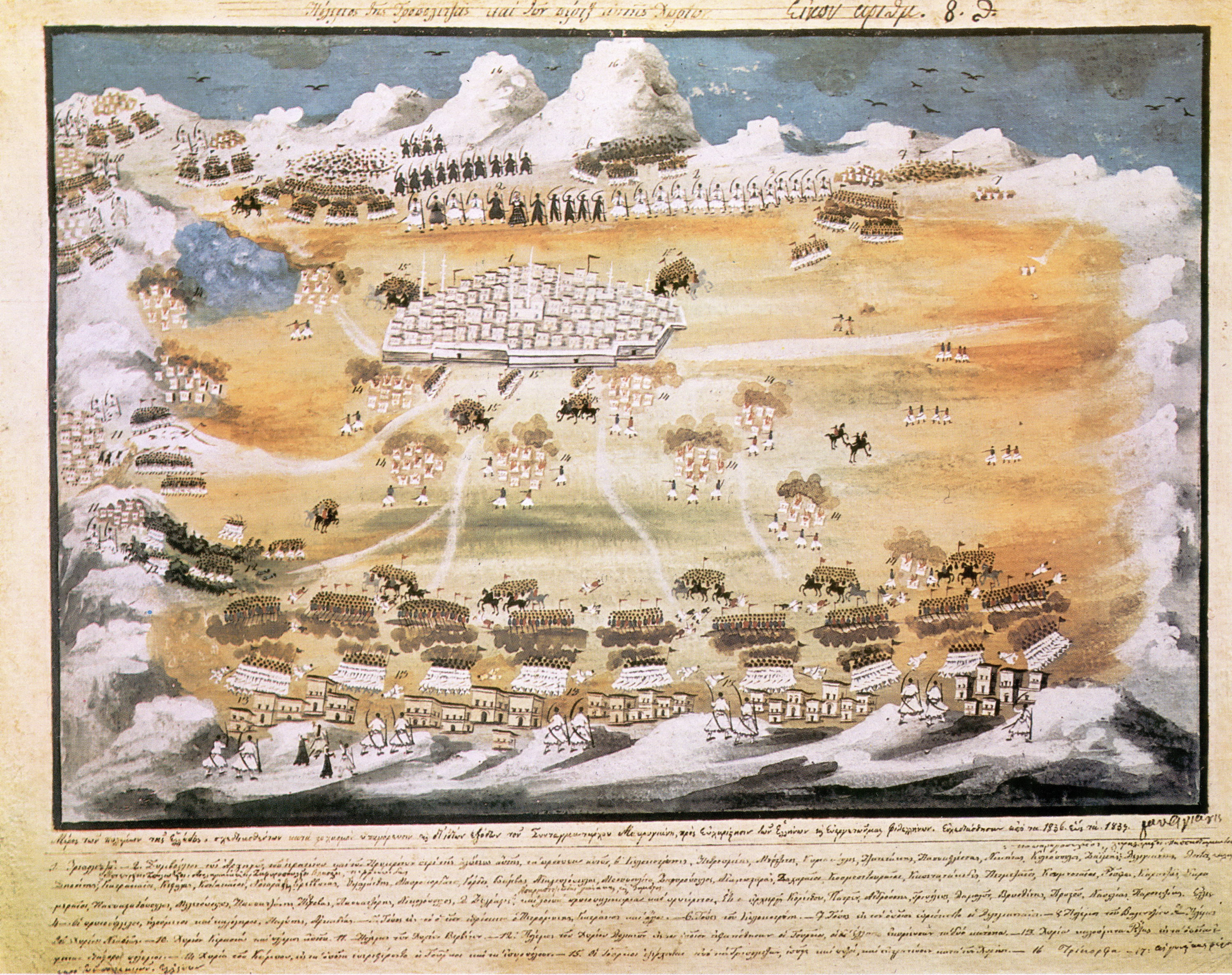
- Scene of the siege of Tripolitsa
Date	April–23 September 1821
Location	Tripoli, Morea Eyalet, Ottoman Empire (now Arcadia, Greece)
Result	Greek victory

Belligerents
Greek Revolutionaries	Ottoman Empire

Commanders and leaders
Theodoros Kolokotronis; Dimitris Plapoutas; Anagnostaras; Petros Mavromichalis; Panagiotis Kefalas; Alexandros Kantakouzinos; Maxime Raybaud	Mustafa Bey (surrendered)

Strength
10,000	12,000

Casualties and losses
100 killed or wounded	8,000 killed, wounded, or captured
- See § Death toll

The siege of Tripolitsa or fall of Tripolitsa (Greek: Άλωση της Τριπολιτσάς, romanized: Álosi tis Tripolitsás, Greek pronunciation: [ˈalosi tis tripoliˈt͡sas]), also known as the Tripolitsa massacre (Turkish: Tripoliçe katliamı), was an early victory of the revolutionary Greek forces in the summer of 1821 during the Greek War of Independence, which had begun earlier that year, against the Ottoman Empire. Tripolitsa was an important target, because it was the administrative center of the Ottomans in the Peloponnese.

Following the capture of the city by Greek revolutionary forces, the Muslim and Jewish population was massacred.

== Background ==
Situated at the center of the Peloponnese, Tripolitsa was the pre-eminent town in southern Greece, and the capital of the Morea Eyalet (first-level province of the Ottoman Empire) since 1786, which made it an important target for the Greek revolutionaries. Many rich Turks and Jews lived there, together with Ottoman refugees, such as Turks and Albanians from Vardounia (Βαρδούνια), who had been driven there by the outbreak of the revolt and escaped massacres in the country's southern districts.

It was also a potent symbol for revenge since its Greek population had been massacred by the Ottoman forces a few months earlier, after the failed rebellion at Moldavia in early 1821. Other massacres of the town's Greeks had occurred in 1715 (during the Ottoman reconquest of the Morea) and on Holy Monday, 29 March 1770, after the failed Orlov Revolt. The de facto commander in chief of the Greek forces, Theodoros Kolokotronis, now focused on the province's capital. He set up fortified camps in the surrounding places and established several headquarters under the command of his captain, Anagnostaras in the nearby villages, notably Zarachova, Piana, Dimitsana and Stemnitsa, where local peasants provided his men with food and supplies.

In addition, a fresh and compact force of Maniot troops under Petros Mavromichalis, the Bey of Mani, arrived and camped at Valtetsi so as to take part in the final assault to the Ottoman capital of Morea. Arvanites were present alongside Greek revolutionaries during the siege and the massacre that followed. Other commanders present at the siege were Bouboulina, Panagiotis Rodios, Alexandros Kantakouzinos, Olivier Voutier, Maxime Raybaud as chief of the artillery, Kanellos Deligiannis and Demetrios Ypsilantis (left before the city was taken).

The Ottoman (Turkish and Albanian) garrison was reinforced in May by some troops and cavalry sent by Hursid Pasha from the north and was led by the Kehayabey Mustafa.

The rebels' decisive victory in the Battle of Valtetsi and several other victorious clashes, such as those in Doliana and Vervena, meant that the Greek revolutionaries had effective control over most areas in the centre and the south of the Peloponnese.

== Siege ==
Four large bodies of besiegers formed a semicircle around Tripolitsa. On the left was Kolokotronis with 2,500 men; on the right, Giatrakos with 1,500; in the center, Anagnostaras with 1,000; and behind the right and center was Petrobey Mavromichalis with 1,500 men. The roads to Argos and Leontari were guarded by 150 and 300 men respectively. Petrobey Mavromichalis was proclaimed commander-in-chief under the supreme leadership of Demetrios Ypsilantis, but the actual leader was Kolokotronis.

Until August, skirmishes took place between the combatants, in which the Greeks had the advantage when confronting the Ottoman infantry. Even when the Ottoman cavalry attacked, they withdrew to the foothills of the mountains and again inflicted damage on the Turks, protected by the terrain.

In August, it became known that Kiamil Bey would transport reinforcements and supplies to Corinth, which was also under siege. Kolokotronis ordered a trench to be dug along the road the Turks would take, but Kiamil Bey did not ultimately set out. However, on 10 August more than four thousand Turks emerged and gathered abundant food from the surrounding villages. On their return, they were attacked by the Greeks lying in ambush in the trench, suffered heavy losses, and all the food and animals fell into the hands of the besiegers. This battle, known as the Battle of Grana or Battle of the Trench, drove the already starving Turks into despair.

At the end of August, the Scottish philhellene Thomas Gordon arrived by ship from Marseille, with Greek and philhellene volunteers, three artillery pieces, and six hundred rifles. However, the Greek artillery was able to inflict very little damage on the enemy, despite the efforts of the foreign volunteers, among them Jean-François-Maxime Raybaud.

Ypsilantis then, while epidemics had already broken out in the city, proposed the surrender of the city on favorable terms, but this was arrogantly rejected by the Turks.

On 26 August, a rumor spread that the Turkish fleet was bringing 10,000 soldiers to Patras for a landing, whereas in reality it had only 1,000 Albanians. Since there was a fear that these troops would reinforce besieged Tripolitsa, Ypsilantis marched to the Gulf of Corinth with 500 of Kolokotronis's men, including his nephew Apostolis and his sons Panos and Gennaios. The Ottoman fleet anchored at Zakynthos, was supplied by the island's neutral authorities, and on 7 September sailed into Patras. Around the middle of September, 700 Albanians from the fleet landed, entered the abandoned Aigio, and burned it down, while they dispersed throughout the province, plundering. On 19 September, the Turkish fleet sailed toward Galaxidi, where it captured 34 ships, destroyed the rest, slaughtered a few elderly people who had remained in the town, and burned it. Ultimately, however, the fleet did not relieve the besieged at Tripolitsa. Its purpose was to facilitate the movement of troops to the Peloponnese, but this expedition failed because of the Turkish defeat at the Battle of Vasilika. Meanwhile, the fortresses of Monemvasia and Navarino surrendered to the Greeks.

The military defeats caused the Ottomans inside Tripolitsa to split into three factions: the local Turks, led by Kiamil Bey; the Turks who had come from Asia, led by Kehaya Bey and the Kaymakam; and the Albanians sent by Hurshid, four thousand according to Fotakos, who were led by Elmas Bey. According to Trikoupis, the first group sought security, the second honor, and the third money. All three regarded any further resistance as futile once they learned that the land reinforcements had been defeated at Vasilika. However, the Asian Ottomans around Kehaya Bey proposed a sortie and escape toward Nafplio, while the Albanians did not want to risk the attempt (especially knowing that if the others left, they would easily come to an agreement with the Greeks). The local Turks, meanwhile, did not want to risk the safety of their families and therefore favored a compromise, relying also on their relations with the Greek notables. The Asians and the Albanians had no families to care for.

Meanwhile, skirmishes took place inside the city between the Albanian soldiers and the Turks. The former looted the property of local Turks, causing unrest among the besieged. They also engaged in a black market in food and water, while receiving their back pay after first surrounding and confining Kehaya Bey in his palace. The Greek besiegers, for their part, had reached 15,000 "in the hope of plunder", and some of them sold supplies to the besieged at night. The Greeks gave the besieged food and received weapons and valuable objects in return. The military commanders saw these transactions but did not intervene because most of the Greeks were unarmed. As Fotakos says, some fought "with the goad of their oxen".

The Turks who favored compromise incited the women, something that was customary among the Ottomans in times of crisis, and so on 6 September they gathered beneath the palace and vehemently demanded a compromise because they were dying of hunger and thirst. At a meeting held immediately afterward, Kehaya Bey was forced to yield, and it was decided that proposals for a compromise would be made to the Greeks through the archbishops and notables who were being held hostage in Tripolitsa.

Because of the hot and humid weather and the hundreds of dead who were being hastily buried inside and around the city, an epidemic of typhus broke out that initially wiped out a large part of the besieged. After the city's capture, the epidemic spread to the Greeks as well, and according to some estimates one quarter of the population of the Peloponnese died during the winter of 1821. The cases of the epidemic are described, among others, by the Polish physician Kutzofski, who accompanied Ypsilantis.

=== Hostages ===
The archbishops and notables were initially merely confined within the city. At the beginning of April, the Turks disarmed and imprisoned eighteen bodyguards of the hostages who had entered the city with them, and on 16 April they beheaded the nephew of a notable and one of his men as persons who were communicating with the besiegers. Immediately afterward, the Turkish crowd rushed at the hostages, but was repulsed by the guard. On 17 April, the hostages were imprisoned "to calm the mob", but the following day the eighteen bodyguards were murdered so that the chain to which they were shackled could be freed, after which the clergymen were to be chained to it.

The hostages lived for five months under tragic conditions. When the Turks released them from prison in order to use them in the negotiations, one metropolitan and one deacon had already died. Six more died immediately after their release in a single day, and two more shortly thereafter. The Turks justified their imprisonment by saying that they had confined them in order to protect them from the mob, and they dictated letters to the besiegers for them to send. When the Turks realized that the capture of the city was approaching, they showed remorse for their treatment of the hostages and began passing outside the prison, greeting them and visiting them. They asked the prisoners not to bear a grudge, because whatever had happened was "teşirati" (fate), and asked them to say good things about them.

=== Negotiations ===
The negotiations were conducted by letter, but the letters were more threatening than conciliatory. The Turks called on the Greeks to lay down their arms and appeal to the Sultan's mercy; otherwise, they would be sold, just as the Serbs had once been sold for three grosia per man. Finally, they asked what the Greeks wanted. The Greeks replied that they guaranteed the lives and honor of the Turks and would allow them to go elsewhere. The Turks requested a meeting of plenipotentiaries, the besiegers agreed, and a truce was concluded.

Immediately, a crowd of starving women and children poured out of the city. The Albanians stationed at the gates stripped them of whatever they had. The Greeks accepted the first people who came out, but they fired upon and drove back the second wave of those leaving. At the same time, however, the Turks also drove them back, firing from the walls. Eventually, those who had emerged from the walls were allowed to remain behind the Greek camp, on the road toward Kalavryta, and to feed themselves as best they could.

On 15 September, a tent was set up on the plain outside the city, near Agios Athanasios, where the plenipotentiaries of the three factions came to negotiate with the Greeks. The Greek side repeated its previous demands, and the Turks returned to the city to consult among themselves. A second meeting was also held, during which the Turks requested 1,800 animals so that they could transport armed men to Myloi, near Nafplio, and 40 European ships to carry them to a place of safety. The Greeks agreed to transport the Turks by ship, but unarmed. They stated that they would allow them to keep their movable property, but demanded fifty million grosia for the devastation of the Peloponnese and as war compensation. No agreement was reached at a third meeting, and hostilities resumed.

=== Private agreements ===
Since the Albanians in general were regarded as being aligned with Ali Pasha of Ioannina, Souliot envoys, now allies of Ali, proposed that a separate agreement be concluded with the Albanians of Tripolitsa. This would both weaken the city's defense and strengthen Ali in his struggle against the Sultan's forces, to the benefit of the Revolution.

The Greeks readily accepted the plan, and so did the Albanians. Elmas Bey reached an agreement with Kolokotronis: the Albanians would leave with their weapons and all their baggage, the harems of the pashas, and the most prominent Turks—namely Kehaya Bey, the kaymakam, the qadi, as well as some others who were not Peloponnesians. They promised to fight against the Sultan as soon as they had safely returned to Epirus. Hostages were provided by Kolokotronis and Kanellos Deligiannis.

When the local Turks learned of the agreement with the Albanians, they panicked. The Albanians and the Asians would leave, and they and their families would be left alone in the face of the revolutionaries. Fierce quarrels accompanied by mutual gunfire broke out between Albanians and Turks, and the latter began making agreements with the Greeks either individually or in groups, leaving the city and declaring that they surrendered to their acquaintances, together with their families and possessions.

But there were also strong complaints on the Greek side. They saw the expected booty, and above all the Albanians' treasures, slipping from their hands. Raybaud states characteristically that the Mavromichalides (the ones who were present), Bouboulina, Kolokotronis, and the other military commanders managed to make fortunes within a few days through these transactions. According to some foreign writers, Bouboulina received rich gifts from wealthy Jewish women "in exchange for vague promises". The sole exception to profiteering was said to be Nikitaras. This rumor concerning Kolokotronis is denied by those who edited his memoirs; they published a letter from Kolokotronis from December 1821 in which he asks for a little cloth to make underwear, "because he has none at all", as well as paper for writing, showing him in an extremely poor financial condition and explicitly disputing the claims.

Andreas Londos sought to violate the agreement concerning the departure of the Albanians because these Albanians had looted Vostitsa, but he was prevented from doing so by Dimitris Plapoutas, who believed that it would be more effective for them, the Greeks, to honour the agreement. During the negotiations, the Greeks attempted to reach an agreement among themselves over the distribution of the booty. Following the fall of the city, according to Filimon, since "the multitude gathered from every corner of the Peloponnese threatened general plunder", it was decided that the soldiers, who had not been paid since the beginning of the siege, would receive three-quarters of the spoils, while the remaining quarter would go to the National Treasury. The distribution among the men would be equal: the rear guard would receive as much as the vanguard. Shares were even provided for the families of those soldiers killed during the battle. At the same time, special rewards were established for each captured Turkish troop, whereas until then they had been paid only for the severed heads they brought to the camp (three piastres). Raybaud, however, states that the severed heads remained in the camp, where they caused a great stench, and had not been handed over in exchange for money. The Kehaya Bey, Kiamil Bey, and other official Turks were placed under bounty.

23 September was set as the date of the Albanians' departure. Their belongings were sent for safekeeping to Kolokotronis's tent. On the eve of the city's fall, another armed confrontation took place between Turks and Albanians inside Tripolitsa.

== Massacre of civilians ==
=== Background ===
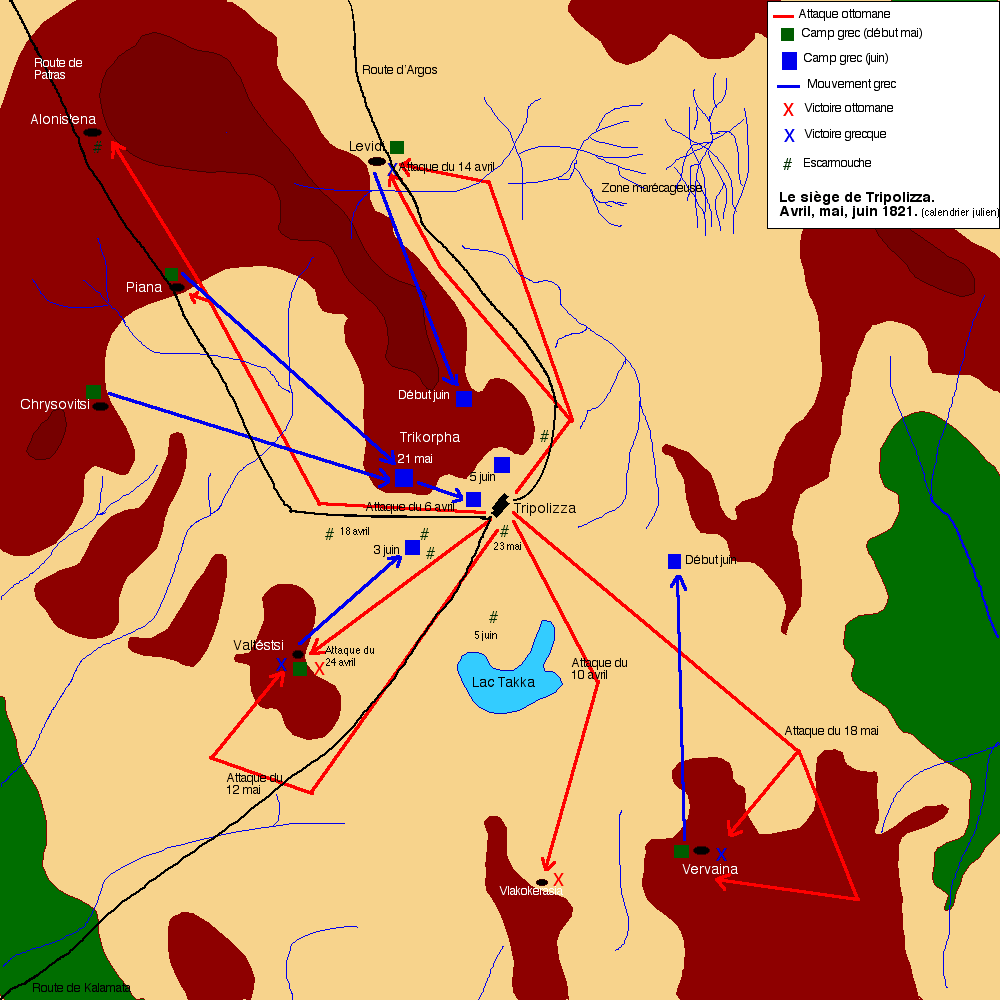
Map showing the first phase of the siege of Tripolitsa during the Greek War of Independence

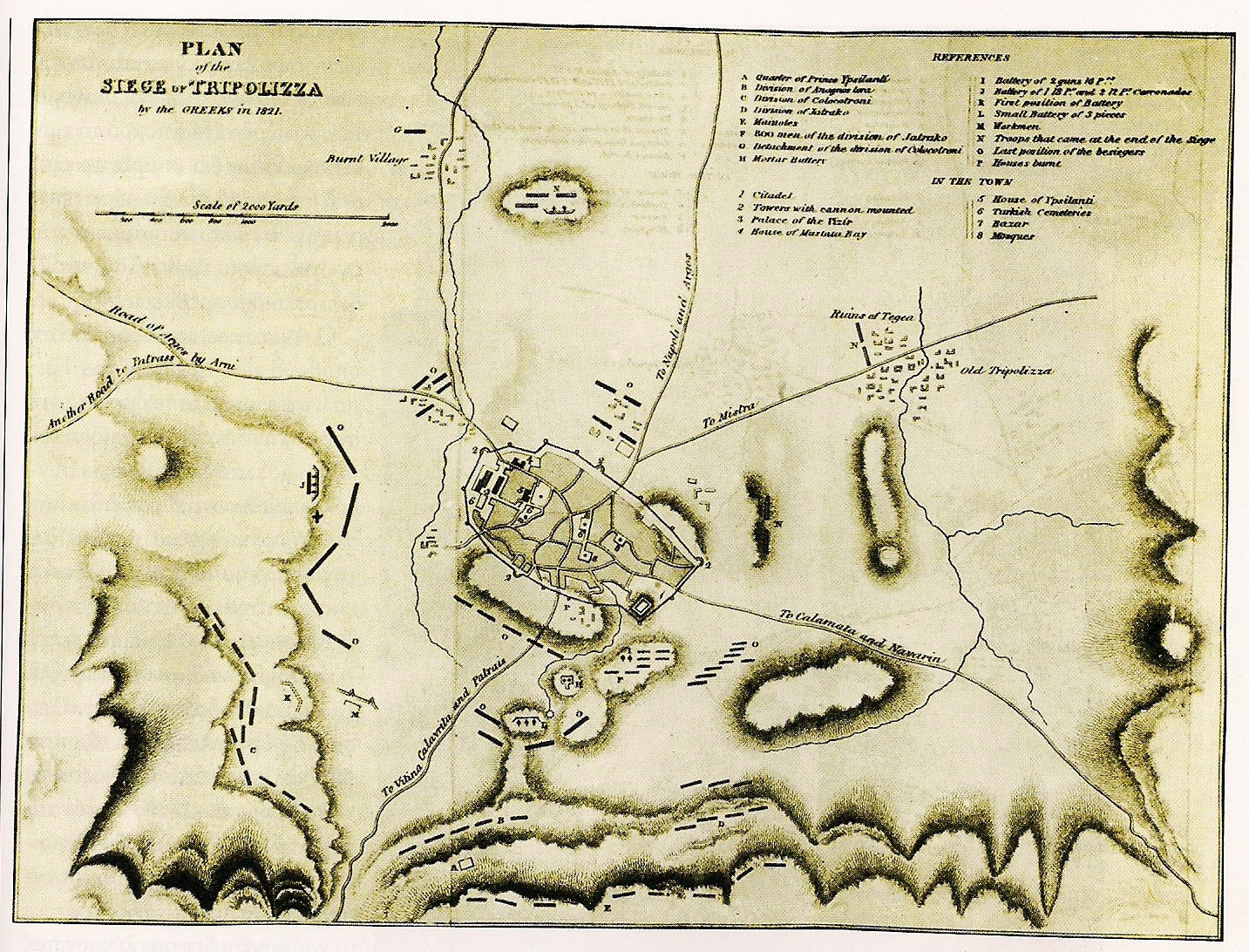
Plan of the siege of Tripolitsa. The detachments of Kolokotronis' division, which have surrounded the town are symbolized by the letter "O".

The region had a history of atrocities. Around fifty years before the siege in question, during the Russo-Turkish War of 1768–1774, the Turks had slaughtered 3,000 of the Greek civilians of Tripolitsa. According to German historian Heinrich Theodor Flathe, the massacre was committed as retaliation to the Constantinople massacre of 1821.

Before and during the siege, eight Greek Orthodox prelates of Peloponnese were incarcerated inside the city, and five of them died before the fall, due to "hardships, torture, and illnesses". They were imprisoned by the Turks, chained in a cramped underground cell, suffered starvation and disease, and were in extremely poor physical condition by the time of the fall. Two of them died before being released, while three died immediately, the day they were released and a few weeks before the city's fall.

=== Massacre ===
In the three days following the city's capture, the Muslims (including combatants, former combatants, and non-combatants) and the Jewish inhabitants of Tripolitsa were massacred. The Muslims composed mostly of Islamized local Greeks, alongside smaller numbers of Romani, Albanians, and ethnic Turks (collectively referred to as "Turks").

=== Opposition by Greek leaders ===
The massacre was not planned and was also opposed by the Greek leaders, including Theodoros Kolokotronis, Fotakos, Spiliadis, Petrobey Mavromichalis, Alexandros Mavrokordatos, Demetrios Ypsilantis and others, who made great efforts to stop it. Ypsilantis ordered that "we are fighting in order to be able to live with the Turks in a state based on law. The cities we conquer are our cities and you should not destroy them". When Kolokotronis arrived, he immediately instructed his soldiers to protect Turkish homes and explicitly ordered for no innocent Turk to be harmed, stating in a written order that "whoever touches them shall receive punishment in the same manner in which they harm them, and even more".

Fotakos wrote how he "begged them to cease the slaughter". The sole non-Greek witness to the massacre, Jean-François-Maxime Raybaud, wrote that, apart from Fotakos, "many [other] captains and other Greeks out of compassion wanted to save some Turks". He reports that "Rhodios, Patroklos, and some Peloponnesian villagers" succeeded in saving many Turks.

When the First Hellenic Republic was declared in 1822, the First Provisional Constitution banned troop misconduct and the Greek government passed a number of provisions and laws to make sure that such atrocities would not be repeated again.

=== Death toll ===
The total number of Muslims, combatants and non-combatants, killed during the sack is unknown. Edward Blaquière, who arrived in Greece two years later, estimated around 6,000 dead. Josiah Conder and Thomas Curtis agreed with that number. Thomas Gordon, who arrived in the city shortly after its fall, estimated it at 8,000. Scholar Aristides N. Hatzis believes this to be the most realistic estimate. Greek historians Spyridon Trikoupis and Ioannis Filimon, both disavowing the atrocity, estimated the number at 10,000, including former combatants and non-combatants. This number is considered close to the truth by historian Kyriakos Simopoulos.

Historian Theophilus C. Prousis, citing David Brewer, reports that: "Flight, disease, starvation, and death in battle reduced the town’s population by almost one-half (from 30,000 to 15,000 residents). Nearly 8,000 Turks and Albanians died in combat during the siege, while an additional 2,000 non-combatants, mostly women and children, were massacred by Greek forces in a nearby gorge". Hezekiah Niles quoted the London Courier in December 1821: "8,000 Turks bearing arms were put to the sword on the taking of Tripolitza".

Many Muslims were saved or spared. Some Greek officers and villagers saved many Turkish civilians. A tiny contingent of Turkish cavalry escaping to Nauplion, a few women, most notable Turks, as well nearly all Albanians, i.e. around 2,000–4,000 individuals, were spared. The commander of Hurshid Pasha's cavalry set fire to the seraglio in order to burn the harems with the women inside, but the Greeks managed to extinguish the fire in time, and the pashas' harem was placed under the protection of Petrobey Mavromichalis who later freed them.

=== Assessments ===
Kolokotronis says in his memoirs:

Inside the town they had begun to massacre. ... I rushed to the place ... If you wish to hurt these Albanians, I cried, "kill me rather; for, while I am a living man, whoever first makes the attempt, him will I kill the first." ... I was faithful to my word of honor ... Tripolitsa was three miles in circumference. The [Greek] host which entered it, cut down and were slaying men, women, and children from Friday till Sunday. Thirty-two thousand were reported to have been slain. One Hydriote [boasted that he had] killed ninety. About a hundred Greeks were killed; but the end came [thus]: a proclamation was issued that the slaughter must cease. ... When I entered Tripolitsa, they showed me a plane tree in the market-place where the Greeks had always been hanged. I sighed. "Alas!" I said, "how many of my own clan – of my own race – have been hanged there!" And I ordered it to be cut down. I felt some consolation then from the slaughter of the Turks. ... [Before the fall] we had formed a plan of proposing to the Turks that they should deliver Tripolitsa into our hands, and that we should, in that case, send persons into it to gather the spoils together, which were then to be apportioned and divided among the different districts for the benefit of the nation; but who would listen?

Based upon accounts and descriptions provided by officers, William St. Clair wrote:

Upwards of ten thousand Turks were put to death. Prisoners who were suspected of having concealed their money were tortured. Their arms and legs were cut off and they were slowly roasted over fires. Pregnant women were cut open, their heads cut off, and dogs' heads stuck between their legs. From Friday to Sunday the air was filled with the sound of screams... One Greek boasted that he personally killed ninety people. The Jewish colony was systematically tortured... For weeks afterwards starving Turkish children running helplessly about the ruins were being cut down and shot at by exultant Greeks... The wells were poisoned by the bodies that had been thrown in...

The Turks of Greece left few traces. They disappeared suddenly and finally in the spring of 1821 unmourned and unnoticed by the rest of the world....It was hard to believe then that Greece once contained a large population of Turkish descent, living in small communities all over the country, prosperous farmers, merchants, and officials, whose families had known no other home for hundreds of years...They were killed deliberately, without qualm or scruple, and there was no regrets either then or later.

Historian Kyriakos Simopoulos wrote that the spurious accounts cited by St. Clair were exaggerations, created simply by taking accounts of previous Ottoman crimes and projecting them onto the Greeks. He notes that people who were actually present in the scene of the massacre state that Turks were killed simply by being shot, as the Greek soldiers did not want to get close to them due to the ongoing epidemic in the city.

Accounts of the behavior of the Greek forces during the atrocity, and the religious exhortations associated with them, closely resemble what St. Clair describes as the longstanding Ottoman methods employed in the Massacre of Chios, suffered by the Greeks themselves eight months later, in 1822.

The massacre at Tripolitsa was the final and largest in a sequence of massacres against Muslims in the Peloponnese during the first months of the revolt. Historians estimate that upwards of twenty thousand Muslim men, women and children were killed during this time, often with the exhortation of the local clergy.

=== Rationale ===
Our friends in Greece are getting on famously. All the Morea is subdued, and much treasure was acquired with the capture of Tripoliza. Some cruelties have ensued. But the oppressor must in the end buy tyranny with blood – such is the law of necessity.

— Mary Shelley, author of Frankenstein, letter to Maria Gisborne

The rationale behind the massacre has been debated. Although the Greek leaders definitively opposed the massacre, seeking to stop it, and most Greeks and other Europeans condemned it as well, some Greeks and non-Greek philhellenes tried to rationalize it in context.

George Finlay suggested that the Greeks were simply imitating the cruelty they had endured, stripping them of total moral blame by pointing to their environment, a concept known as "mirroring". Meanwhile, Thomas Gordon said in an 1823 speech:

... in a war of that description, when a whole country is attempted to be put to the sword, the war cannot be carried on according to those nice feelings of honour which have always distinguished the troops and inhabitants of this country. [The Greeks] were no common or ordinary sufferers [and] were justly enraged at the conduct of the Turks, in putting to death, impaling, and burning their friends and relatives.

Percy Bysshe Shelley, in his poem Hellas, implied how extreme oppression naturally breeds extreme revenge. Samuel Gridley Howe, recounting Olivier Voutier's story of an old Greek shepherd whose son was killed by a Turk, wrote that: "Where is the father, with a soul so free from the frailties of human nature, as not to have exclaimed with the old shepherd – 'give me vengeance and let me die!' ". Mary Shelley, novelist and author of Frankenstein, wrote positively of the siege, while noting that the cruelties were plainly justified, as "the oppressor must in the end buy tyranny with blood – such is the law of necessity".

Historian James Irving Manatt considered the massacre:

[a] natural result of the experience of four hundred years under the Muslims, of the subjection of the Greeks on Greek soil to a handful of foreign conquerors, diametrically opposed in race, religion and civilization, who drained their best blood to gratify their passion for lawless power and its enforcement, till the accumulated oppression ripened with an inevitable harvest into a national vendetta.

Abraham John Valpy shared a similar assessment. Valpy wrote:

the most barbarous of all ... is the attempt of some to assimilate the Greek character of 'systematic cruelty', as they call it, with that of the Turks themselves, and for this reason they are continually referring to the history of the atrocities committed at Tripolitza. ... If we speak of systematic cruelties, we ought not to give so much attention to the horrid acts of war, dreadful as they are, as to those which for four successive centuries have been unilaterally inflicted upon their innocent victims.

Hezekiah Niles quoted an article in the London Courier without any personal comment: "But the Turks, acting under the orders of a legitimate government, may murder the Greeks, and their women and children—their patriarchs, archbishops and priests at". He then proceeded to note how, during the siege of the city, the Greeks had found out that the Turks had just murdered "12,000 to 13,000 [Greek] hostages of all ages and both sexes" in other parts of the Ottoman Empire. Historian Charles L. Booth wrote:

Turkish cruelty was committed against innocent civilians, whereas the cruelty of the Greeks was a function of spontaneous rage by individuals who had lost helpless loved ones. This meant that Turkish cruelty was premeditated and vicious, perpetrated by officials of the Turkish state. What the Greeks did was spontaneous and unprovoked. One could, presumably, sympathize with Greek cruelty, but not with atrocities committed by the Turks. In its reprinting of the London Courier article, Niles itself in no way qualified what the Courier had reported. Both journals seemed to accept that Turkish violence was barbaric, whereas Greek violence was spontaneous and the product of justifiable provocation.

According to German historian Heinrich Theodor Flathe, the massacre was committed as retaliation to the Constantinople massacre of 1821. Jean-François-Maxime Raybaud, the sole non-Greek eyewitness to the massacre, agreed, writing that: "Alas, a considerable population was to be offered to the spirits of the victims of Smyrna, Constantinople, Scala-Nova, and Ayvali, and new sufferings, new outrages against humanity, were about to avenge four centuries of oppression and injury".

=== Jews ===
Steven Bowman believes that, although the Jews were murdered, they were not targeted specifically, in fact: "Such a tragedy seems to be more a side-effect of the butchering of the Turks of Tripolis, the last Ottoman stronghold in the South where the Jews had taken refuge from the fighting, than a specific action against Jews per se." A friend of Kolokotronis, Anagnostis Zafeiropoulos, along with Fotios Chrysanthopoulos, rescued a Jewish family named Hanam before the siege. During the siege and the subsequent massacre, another Jew, called Levi, was rescued personally by Kolokotronis himself.

== Aftermath ==
The capture of the city of Tripolis had a salutary effect on the morale of the revolutionaries. The Greeks then saw that their way towards victory was possible and secured approximately 11,000 arms, with the entire Peloponnese bearing hardly any trace of Ottomans anymore.

On the other hand, it also marked the first strong point of discord in what had been an apparently-cohesive force since the atrocities committed during the siege were at the time strongly decried and criticised by some Phanariote figures of the Greek War of Independence such as Dimitrios Ypsilantis and Alexandros Mavrokordatos.

The residual bitterness over the ultimate disposition of the spoils, along with the generalized anarchy following the fall of the city, emphasised the divergent perspectives between the Peloponnesian chieftains (military faction) and the intellectual mentors of the uprising (political faction). In time, they would develop into an internal conflict and later into civil wars within the same struggle for independence.

== See also ==
- Navarino massacre
- List of massacres in Greece
- Massacres during the Greek Revolution
- Hymn to Liberty

== Sources ==
- Phillips, Alison W. The War of Greek Independence, 1821 to 1833. London, 1897.
- General Makriyannis, Απομνημονευματα (Memoirs). Athens, 1907
- William St. Clair. That Greece Might Still Be Free The Philhellenes in the War of Independence. London: Oxford University Press, 1972. ISBN 0-19-215194-0
- Stratiki Poti. To Athanato 1821. Ekdosis Stratiki Bros. Athens, 1990.
- Kolokotronis, Theodoros. Memoirs. Ekdosis Vergina. Athens, 2002.
- Digitised online copy of Elizabeth M. Edmonds' English translation, Kolokotrones, the Klepht and the Warrior, Sixty Years of Peril and Daring. An autobiography. London, 1892.
- Diamantouros, Nikiforos. The beginning of the constitution of the modern state of Greece. Athens, 2002.
- Finlay, George. History of the Greek revolution, Volume 1. William Blackwood and Sons, Edinburgh and London, 1861. Online copy
- Grenet, Mathieu. La fabrique communautaire. Les Grecs à Venise, Livourne et Marseille, 1770–1840. Athens and Rome, École française d'Athènes and École française de Rome, 2016 (ISBN 978-2-7283-1210-8)
