= Battle of Dervenakia =

Ottoman expedition led by Mahmud Dramali Pasha against Greek Rebellion

- Part of the Greek War of Independence
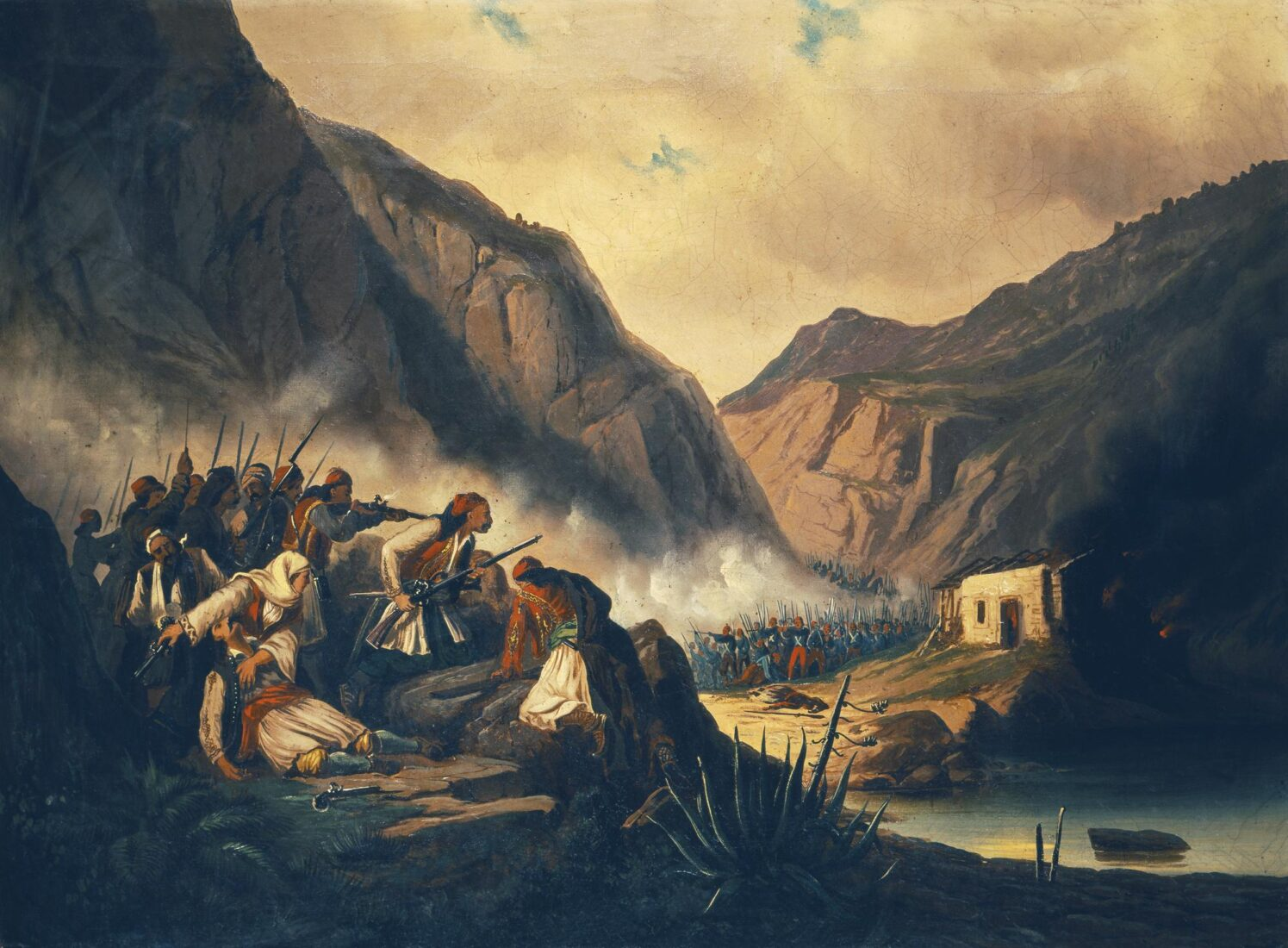
- The Greek victory in Dervenakia (1822)
Date	6–8 August 1822 (26–28 July O.S.)
Location	Dervenakia, Morea Eyalet, Ottoman Empire (now Peloponnese, Greece)
Result	Greek victory; Destruction of Dramali's army

Belligerents
(Greece) First Hellenic Republic	Ottoman Empire

Commanders and leaders
Theodoros Kolokotronis; Demetrios Ypsilantis; Papaflessas; Nikitaras	Mahmud Dramali Pasha

Strength
8,000–10,000	20,000 (including 8,000 cavalry)

Casualties and losses
Unknown	20,000 dead

The Battle of Dervenakia (Greek: Μάχη των Δερβενακίων) was the Greek victory over the Ottoman forces on 6–8 August 1822, an important event in the Greek War of Independence.

It resulted in the defeat of a major expedition by Mahmud Dramali Pasha, intended to quell the ongoing Greek rebellion which had begun in 1821. The destruction of Dramali Pasha's forces saved the heartland of the rebellion, the Morea, and secured it for the Greeks until the arrival of Ibrahim Pasha in 1825.

== Background ==
After the Greek victory at the Battle of Vasilika in 1821, the Ottoman army was prevented from entering Attica and the Peloponnese, and by the summer of 1822 the Ottomans were prepared for another attempt to move southwards and crush the Greek uprising. The Ottomans had assembled an army of some 20,000 men and 8,000 cavalry with ample supplies and transportation at Larissa, which was eventually entrusted to Dramali Pasha of Drama, the army was the largest seen in Greece since the last Ottoman-Venetian war. Dramali was expected to crush the Greek rebellion by advancing to Corinth, relieve the besieged garrison of Nafplion and recapture the capital of the Morea, Tripoli. While the Ottomans were now in a better position than a year earlier, the same could not be said for the Greeks who had been weakened by infighting and disagreement between their leaders, who failed to cooperate and make adequate preparations for Dramali's advance.

== Start of the campaign and retaking of Corinth ==
In early July, Dramali set out from Zitouni (today Lamia) and found initial success. The Greeks, who were unprepared, left Dramali's army largely unassailed, and by the 17th of July Dramali had retaken Corinth, which had been abandoned by its defenders. However, Dramali decided against retaking Athens, which had fallen earlier to the Greeks on 21 June. At Corinth, Dramali held a military council to decide on future actions. Emboldened by the rapid progress and disintegration of the Greeks at the beginning of his campaign, Dramali proposed to march his entire army to Nafplio. This was met with disagreement from Yussaf Pasha and Ali Pasha, who instead proposed to strengthen their position at Corinth and to build up a strong naval force in the Saronic Gulf. Dramali rejected this plan and decided to carry out his march towards Nafplion.

== Siege of Nafplion ==
Dramali passed through the narrow defile known as the Dervenaki (Tretos) and on 24 July reached Argos, whence the Greek government had fled. The flight of the Greek government from Argos without a shot being fired inflicted a blow to its prestige that it never recovered from as many Greeks damned their government as one of cowards. Earlier that year, the Ottomans had committed the Chios Massacre, and refugees from Chios had brought vivid tales of the murder, rape and enslavement committed on Chios to the mainland; the news of Dramali Pasha's advance created panic all over the Morea. The Maniots, who were supposed to stop the Ottomans instead robbed the refugees, leading Colonel Thomas Gordon to caustically comment that the Maniots “would have reputed it a disgrace to have gone back to their mountains as poor as they left them”. Dramali Pasha left no guards behind him in the Dervenaki and he posted no forces where other defiles exposed his flanks. He sent cavalry forward to join the Ottoman garrison at Nafplion, which at that time was on the point of capitulation. As it was, Dramali was able to seize the Greek hostages which the garrison was held there as a pledge for the safety of Muslim hostages held by the Greeks.

== Trapped in the Argolis ==
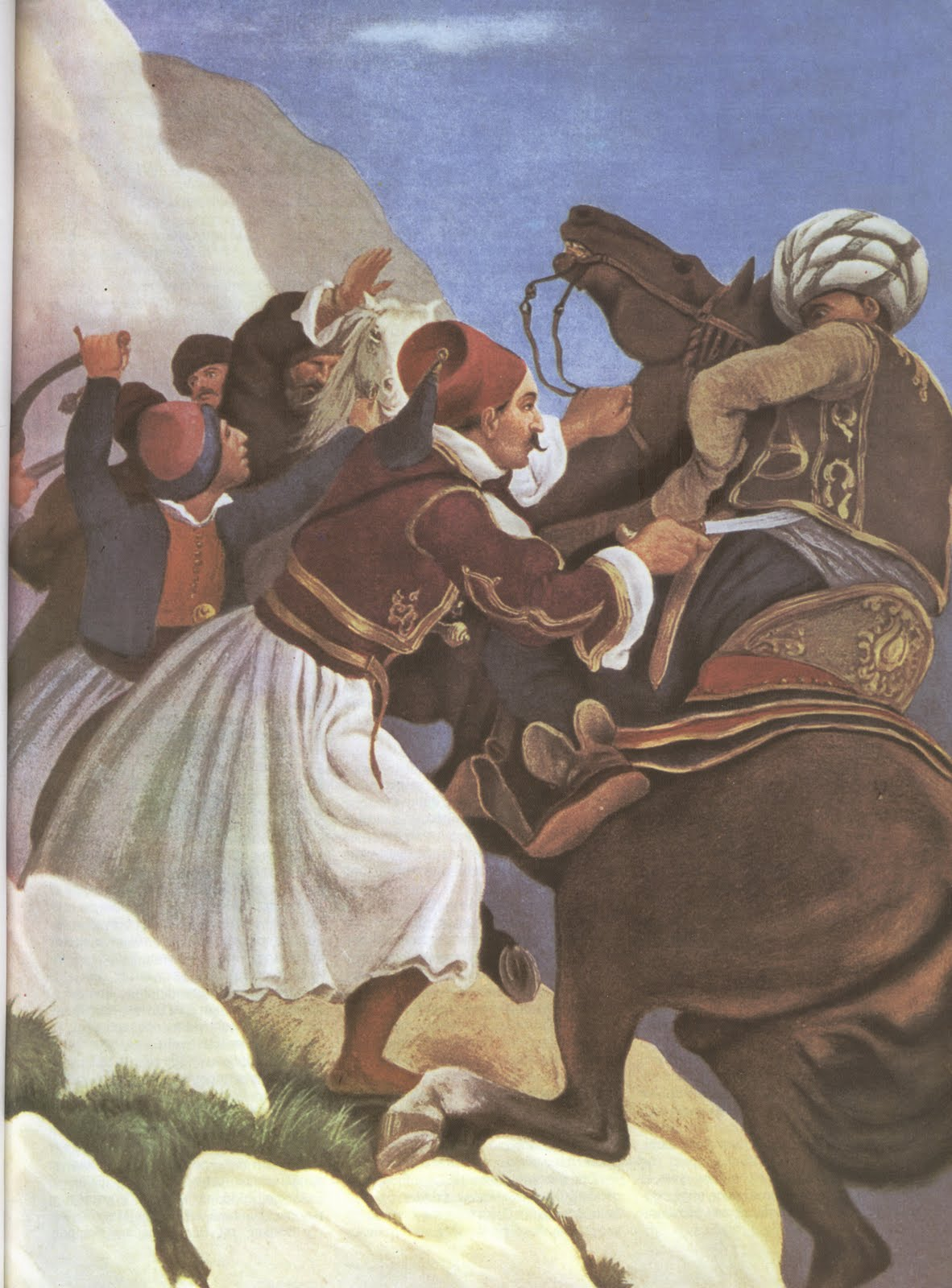
Nikitaras during the Battle of Dervenakia by Peter von Hess.

On arriving in Argos, he found that its citadel, Larisa (Argos), was manned, and that the Ottoman fleet, with which he had planned to rendezvous with at Nafplion, was actually at Patras. What he should have done was to have fallen back immediately to Corinth, from where he could have drawn supplies from Patras. Instead, he launched an attack on the citadel. The Greeks, under Demetrios Ypsilantis, held out for twelve days, waging a resolute defense before lack of water forced them to sneak out past the Ottoman lines in the middle of the night. Gordon recounted when faced with the demand for surrender: “Prince Demetrius received the bearers of this proposal with apparent indifference, regaled them out of the small stock of luxuries reserved for his own table and declared his resolution to hold out for six months.” On the night of 3 August 1822, faced with no water, Ypsilantis led his men out of the Argos citadel. By this point, Dramali's army had no more cattle, the burned grain fields supplied no subsistence, and the summer of 1822 was an especially hot summer (making water a scarce commodity). The plain south of Argos was a land of ditches, interconnected water lanes and vineyards, which hindered the Ottoman cavalry, but was the perfect terrain for Greek snipers, who soon started to take a regular toll on the Ottoman forces. However, while Dramali was preoccupied with Larissa, the Greeks rallied their forces.

Already the Peloponnesian Senate had stepped into the place vacated by the central government. Military leaders like Theodoros Kolokotronis and Petrobey Mavromichalis called for volunteers, who came flocking in, along with the kapetanei and the primates. Five thousand troops assembled at the fortified Mills of Lerna; others assembled at points on the marshy banks of the river Erasinos; and daily, the Greeks skirmished with the Ottomans as they attempted to find water and fodder for their horses and baggage animals. Other Greek bands infiltrated the mountains which overlook the plains of Argos. On the hills extending from Lerna to the Dervenaki, Kolokotronis, who had been appointed archistratigos (commander-in-chief), concentrated no less than 8,000 men. Around Agionori there were 2,000 troops under Ypsilantis, Nikitaras and Papaflessas. Towards Nafplion, large forces were assembled under Nikolaos Stamatelopoulos, the brother of Nikitaras, and these were joined by Arvanites from Kranidi, Poros and Kastri.

Kolokotronis pursued a scorched earth policy, aiming at starving the Ottomans out. The Greeks looted the villages, burned the grain and foodstuff they could not move, and damaged the wells and springs. Dramali's army was trapped in the sweltering Argolic plain. However, Kolokotronis was not in a position to coordinate all the Greek forces, for many operated under their own leaders, refusing to follow his orders. If Kolokotronis had in fact commanded the Greek armies, and thus been able draw up a general military plan, Dramali's forces might have been completely annihilated and Nafplion would have been captured with little difficulty.

== Disaster in the ravines ==
As it was, Dramali was given the opportunity to carry out his belated decision to retreat. On 6 August he dispatched an advance guard consisting of 1,000 Muslim Albanians to occupy the passes. These troops, who were either mistaken by the Greeks for cobelligerents or deliberately allowed to pass, got through entirely unharmed, losing only three men. The Albanians kept to the mountains, avoiding the trails, making them difficult to ambush. After the Albanians marched through, Nikitaras and Ypsilantis had brought down trees and piled up stones to slow down the Ottomans. But a body of Dramali's cavalry which was following up to occupy the Dervenaki was intercepted by Nikitaras at the village of Agios Vasilis and was routed, a victory which gained for Nikitaras the name of 'Turk-eater' (Turkofagos). The Greeks brought down devastating fire and then charged, slaying the Ottomans in vicious hand-to-hand fighting. Very few of the Ottoman delhis (light cavalry) managed to escape; most of them had lost their horses and, as they tried to make their way on foot up the ravines of the mountains, were almost all intercepted by small Greek bands or shot down by individual marksmen from concealed positions. During the encounter the Greeks took an enormous amount of booty – hundreds of horses and baggage animals and a considerable quantity of treasure, arms and stores.

Two days later (8 August), Dramali attempted to evacuate his main forces by way of the route through Agionori. Here he came up against the Greeks under Papaflessas who was holding the main defile (Klisoura). Unable to proceed, he soon found himself assailed by Nikitaras and Ypsilantis who made a forced march from their positions at the village of Agios Vasilis and at Agios Sostis, where the Greeks again annihilated the Ottomans by ambushing them in a narrow defile. Although Dramali himself with the main troop of delhis managed to force his way through and finally reach Korinthos, the Greeks captured all the baggage and the military chest; and they annihilated almost completely the unmounted personnel of Dramali's army. Had Iatrakos followed orders by attacking from the rear, all of Dramali's army might have been destroyed, which led Koloktronis to write in his memoirs: “So much for Iatrakos.” Dramali himself lost his sword and turban in his haste to run away and save his own life. The Greeks had captured all of the Ottoman valuables and baggage plus 1,300 mules, 400 horses, and 700 camels. No sooner had they achieved victory than they dispersed. The Moreots hastened to return to their villages taking with them such animals and other booty on which they had been able to lay their hands. Had they been less intent on booty, they might have totally annihilated Dramali's army. As it was, many of the delhis lived to fight another day, but Dramali himself died, a broken man, the following December at Korinthos. His campaign had resulted in a disaster of great magnitude: Out of the army of more than 23,000 with which he entered the Morea, barely 6,000 had survived. The extent of the Ottoman defeat became proverbial in Greece, where a great defeat is still referred to as a "καταστροφή του Δράμαλη", i.e. "Dramali's disaster".

A part of the destroyed Dramali's army (c. 3,000) decided to move towards Patras to be saved. Near Vostizza, Andreas Londos with his men attacked them and only a few were lucky to escape.

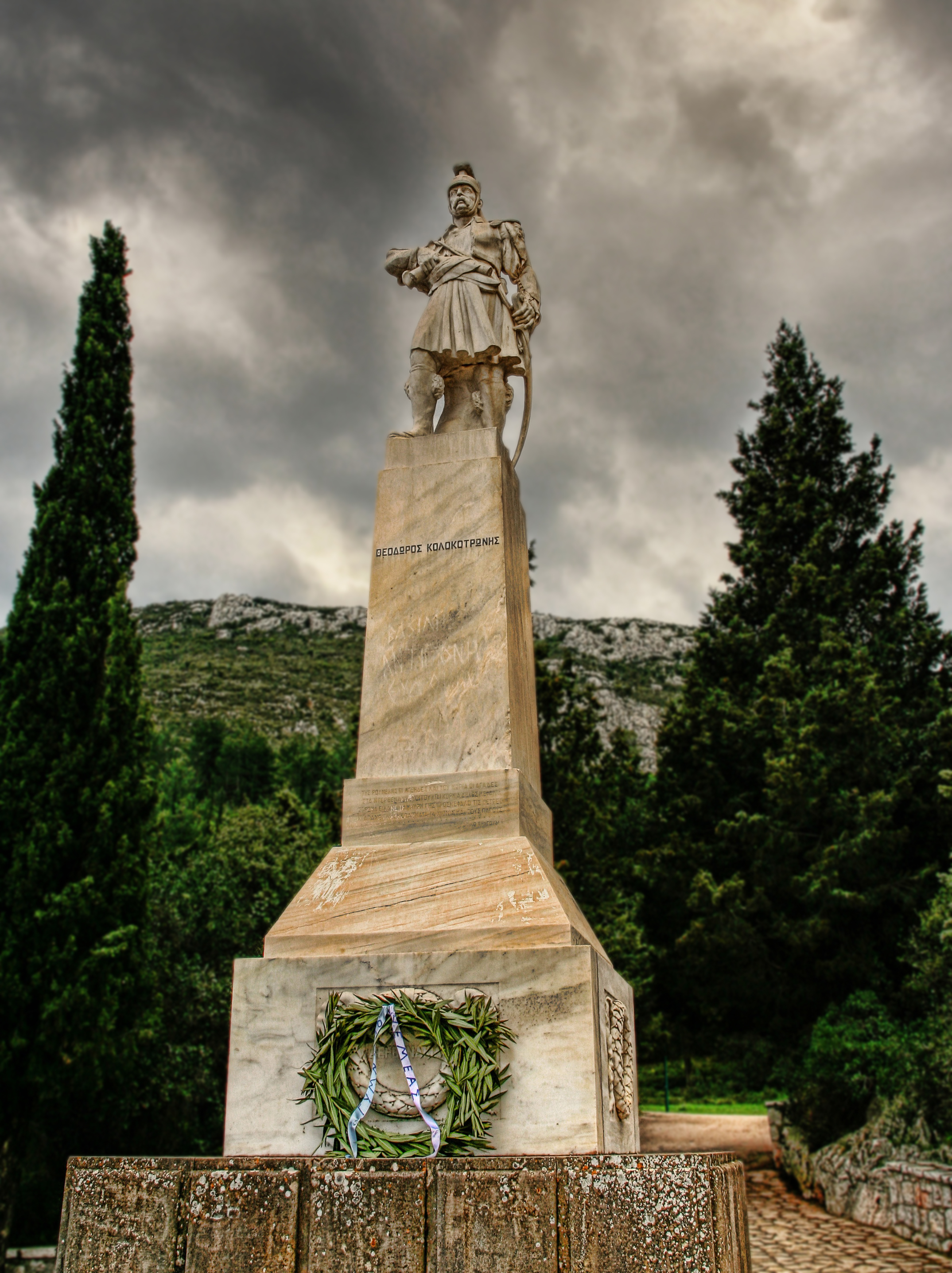
Statue of Theodoros Kolokotronis at Dervenakia.

== Aftermath ==
With the destruction of the main Ottoman force present in Greece at the time, the revolution survived its first great test, and was firmly now established. In December 1822, Nafplion finally surrendered to the Greeks, who made it their provisional capital. The Greek cause would however quickly unravel, with factional conflict breaking out in 1823. Gordon wrote that the victory at Dervenakia made Kolokotronis's reputation as "his name became a sort of talisman, the people everywhere sung ballads in his honor, his political adversaries humbled themselves before him and for some months he was absolute in the Morea". Inevitably, Kolokotronis' popularity made him a target for his political enemies, who now united against the most popular man in Greece. Kolokotronis himself, arguably the Greeks' ablest military leader, was imprisoned by his enemies in Palamidi, at a time when the Sultan, acknowledging his inability to deal with the "Greek problem", turned to Muhammad Ali of Egypt and his Western-trained armies for help.

== Bibliography ==
- Dakin, Douglas The Greek Struggle for Independence, 1821–1833. Berkeley: University of California Press, 1973.
- Kokkinos, D. The Greek Revolution. Athens: Melissa Press, 1957.
- Gallant, Thomas W. The Edinburgh History of the Greeks, 1768–1913. Edinburgh: Edinburgh University Press, 2015, pp. 81–82.
- Brewer, David The Greek War of Independence, London: Overlook Duckworth, 2011
