= Maurice Persat =

Maurice Persat (30 April 1788 in Puy-de-Dôme, Ennezat – 1858) was a French officer and writer, participant of the Napoleonic Wars and revolutionary wars in Latin America, Greece and Spain.

== Biography ==
Persat was born in Puy-de-Dome in central France in 1788. He was a captain of cavalry in Napoleon's army. He received the Order of the "Legion of Honor" from the hands of Napoleon in 1813. After the Hundred Days, he was retired on half-pay. He formed a rebel force in the Loire, but was exiled during the Bourbon Restoration. He also participated in a conspiracy for rescuing of Napoleon from the island of Saint Helena. In 1817, he immigrated to the United States. In 1818, he joined the army of Simón Bolívar, but was disappointed with leaders and by February 1819 went to the island of Martinique. He returned to France and again took part in a pro-Napoleon plot. He participated in the Neapolitan Revolution and was imprisoned by the Austrians, but escaped. Since the beginning of the Greek Revolution against the Ottomans in 1821, he went to Greece. According to Dimitris Fotiadis he was one of the first officers of the 1st Battalion of the regular Greek army, which by order of Demetrios Ypsilantis was organized in July 1821 in the town of Kalamata by the Corsican officer Joseph Baleste; according to himself, he didn't belong to this Battalion but was attached to the staff of Ypsilantis.

After Greece, Persat went to Spain and took part in battles against the forces of Louis Antoine, Duke of Angoulême, as commander of a cavalry detachment under the command of Francisco Espoz y Mina. In the years 1838-1839, he wrote "Memoirs 1806-1844", which, however, remained unpublished until 1910.
