= Theodoros Kolokotronis =

Greek revolutionary leader (1770–1843)

- Θεόδωρος Κολοκοτρώνης
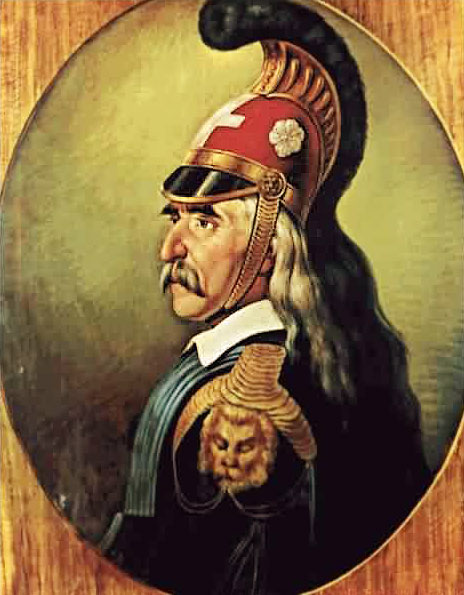
- Portrait by Dionysios Tsokos (1861)
- Born: 3 April 1770; Ramοvouni, Messenia, Morea Eyalet, Ottoman Empire (now Greece)
- Died: 15 February 1843 (aged 72); Athens, Attica, Kingdom of Greece
- Burial place: First Cemetery of Athens (until 1930); Areos Square, Tripoli (since 1930); 37°57′47.38″N 23°44′16.35″E
- Spouse: Aikaterini Karousou
- Children: 6, including Panos Kolokotronis (son) and Ioannis (Gennaios) Kolokotronis (son)
- Relatives: Konstantinos Kolokotronis (father); Nikitas Stamatelopoulos (nephew)
- Military career
- Allegiance: (Russia) Russian Empire; United Kingdom; Hellenic State; Kingdom of Greece
- Branch: Imperial Russian Navy; British Army; Hellenic Army
- Service years: 1785–1843
- Rank: Major (British Army); General-in-Chief (revolutionary forces); Lieutenant General (Hellenic Army)
- Nicknames: O Geros tou Moria (The Old Man of Morea); Ο Γέρος του Μοριά
- Units: 1st Regiment Greek Light Infantry
- Commands: Greek revolutionary forces
- Wars: Russo-Turkish War (1806–12); Napoleonic Wars; Adriatic Campaign; Siege of Santa Maura; Greek War of Independence; Battle of Valtetsi; Battle of the Trench; Siege of Tripolitsa; Siege of Acrocorinth; Siege of Nauplia; Siege of Patras; Battle of Dervenakia; Greek Civil Wars
- Other work: Member of the Filiki Etaireia; Member of the Russian Party

Theodoros Kolokotronis (Greek: Θεόδωρος Κολοκοτρώνης; 3 April 1770 – 15 February [O.S. 3 February] 1843) was a Greek general and the pre-eminent leader of the Greek War of Independence (1821–1829) against the Ottoman Empire.

The son of a klepht leader who fought the Ottomans during the Orlov revolt, Kolokotronis also operated as a klepht and an armatolos early in his life. While serving in the British army during the Napoleonic Wars, he became influenced by the revolutionary ideas of the era. On the outbreak of the Greek War of Independence, he organized a band of klephts in the Peloponnese and captured Tripolitsa in late 1821. Kolokotronis achieved his greatest success at the 1822 Battle of Dervenakia, where he routed the Ottoman forces under the command of Mahmud Dramali Pasha. From 1823 to 1825, he took part in the Greek civil wars and, following the defeat of his faction, he was briefly imprisoned in Hydra. In 1825, Kolokotronis was released and appointed commander-in-chief of the Greek forces in Peloponnese. He defended Greece against an Egyptian intervention.

After the war, Kolokotronis became a supporter of Ioannis Kapodistrias and a proponent of alliance with Russia. After Kapodistrias's assassination in 1831, Kolokotronis backed Prince Otto of Bavaria for the Greek throne. He later turned against Otto's regency, for which he was charged with treason and sentenced to death, but in 1835 he was pardoned. Kolokotronis died in 1843 in Athens.

== Early life ==
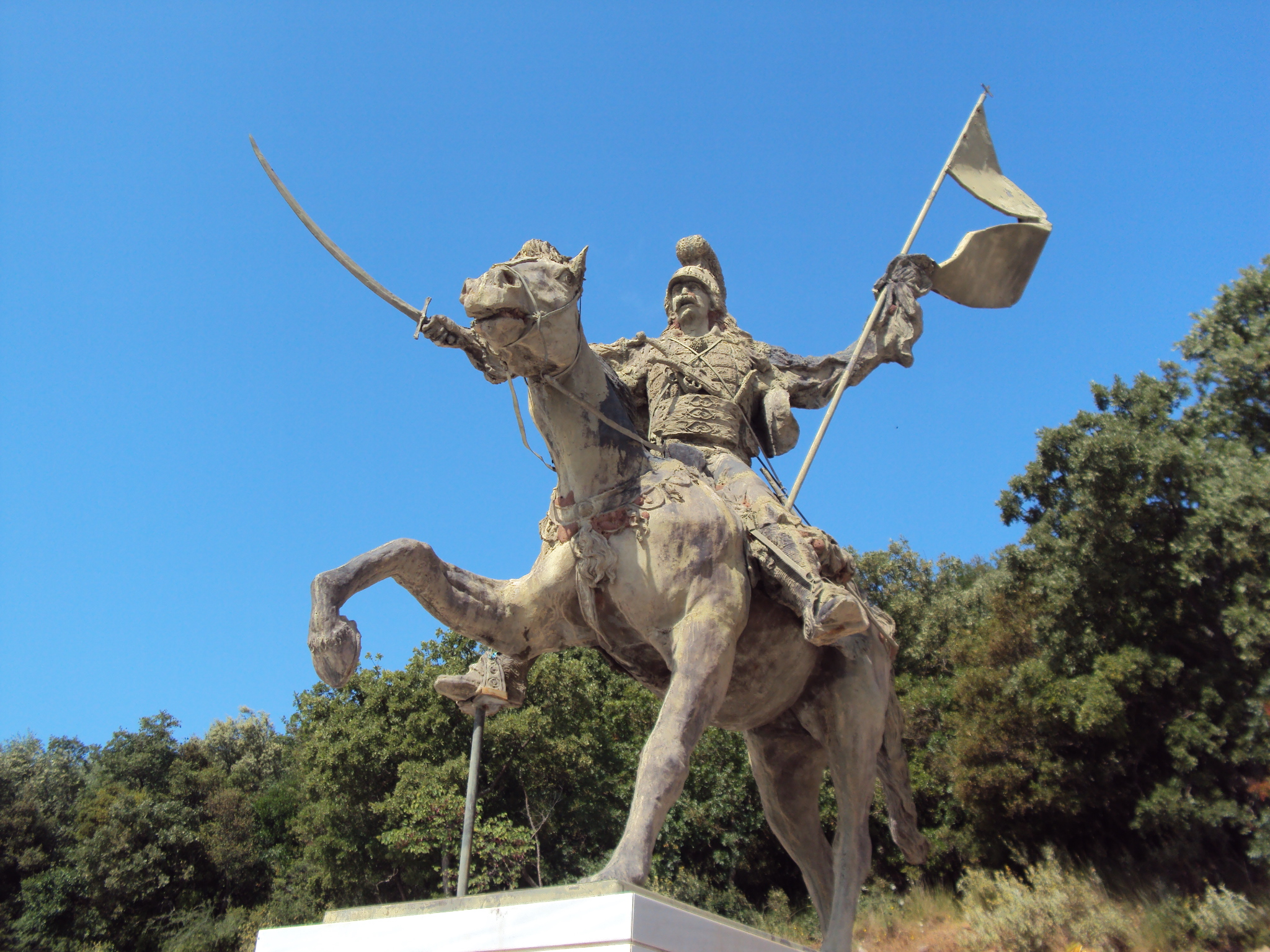
Imposing statue of Kolokotronis in Ramovouni, Messenia, his birthplace.

Theodoros Kolokotronis was born at Ramavouni (Ραμαβούνι), a mountain in Messenia, and was baptized in the village of Piana. He descended from a family of klephts, originally from the historical village of Roupaki at the border of Messenia and Arcadia, located nearby the settlement of Tourkoleka. His mother, Zambia Kotsaki, hailed from the mountain village of Alonistaina. Kolokotronis grew up in the village of Libovitsi, Arcadia, in the central Peloponnese, but also spent part of his childhood in his mother's hometown.

The Kolokotroneoi were a powerful and respected clan in the surrounding areas in the 18th century. Their legendary pride and insubordination is commemorated in a well-known folk song of that time:

"On a horse they go to church,
On a horse they kiss the icons,
On a horse they receive communion
From the priest's hand."

The Turks chased the family, which was forced to leave the tower – Kolokotronis was ten years old at the time – and took refuge in Milea, Mani. His father, Konstantinos Kolokotronis, was a former captain of the Armatoloi in Corinth, who took part in an armed rebellion, the Orlov Revolt, instigated by the administration of Catherine the Great of Russia. He was killed in 1780 in an engagement with Ottoman troops, along with two of his brothers, George and Apostolis. Theodoros was named in honour of Fyodor Orlov. Following his father's death, at the age of 15, he was taken in and mentored by Mitros Petrovas (Μήτρος Πέτροβας). It was Mitro Petrovas that taught him his first lessons about fighting. Theodoros always called him "uncle" (μπάρμπα) and had him by his side, as an adviser and fighter, throughout his life.

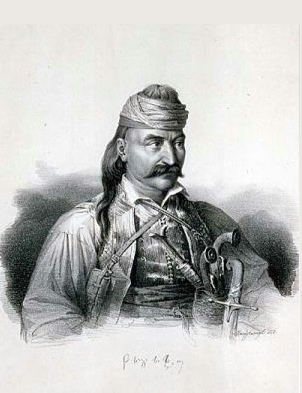
Lithography of Kolokotronis by Karl Krazeisen used for the 5000 drachma banknote

Prior to the Greek Revolution, Theodoros Kolokotronis operated as a klepht (a warrior-bandit), an armatolos (a Christian irregular of the Ottoman military), and as a kápos (a militiaman employed by Greek notables of the Peloponnese). As a kapos, Kolokotronis worked for the Deligiannis family. He acquired wealth by stealing sheep and marrying the daughter of a wealthy Peloponnesian notable.

In 1805 he joined the Russian Navy during the Russo-Turkish War (1806–1812). In 1806 Ottoman attacks against the klephts forced Kolokotronis to flee to the island of Zakynthos (or Zante). When Zakynthos was occupied by the British, he obtained useful military experience while serving under the command of Richard Church, a philhellene, in the 1st Regiment Greek Light Infantry; in 1810, Kolokotronis was promoted to the rank of major. From his service in the British Army, he adopted his characteristic red helmet. While in the Heptanese (a French protectorate from 1807 to 1814), he came in contact with the revolutionary ideas of the era and was influenced by them:

According to my judgement, the French Revolution and the doings of Napoleon opened the eyes of the world. The nations knew nothing before, and the people thought that kings were gods upon the earth and that they were bound to say that whatever they did was well done. Through this present change it is more difficult to rule the people.

== Greek War of Independence ==
=== Outbreak ===
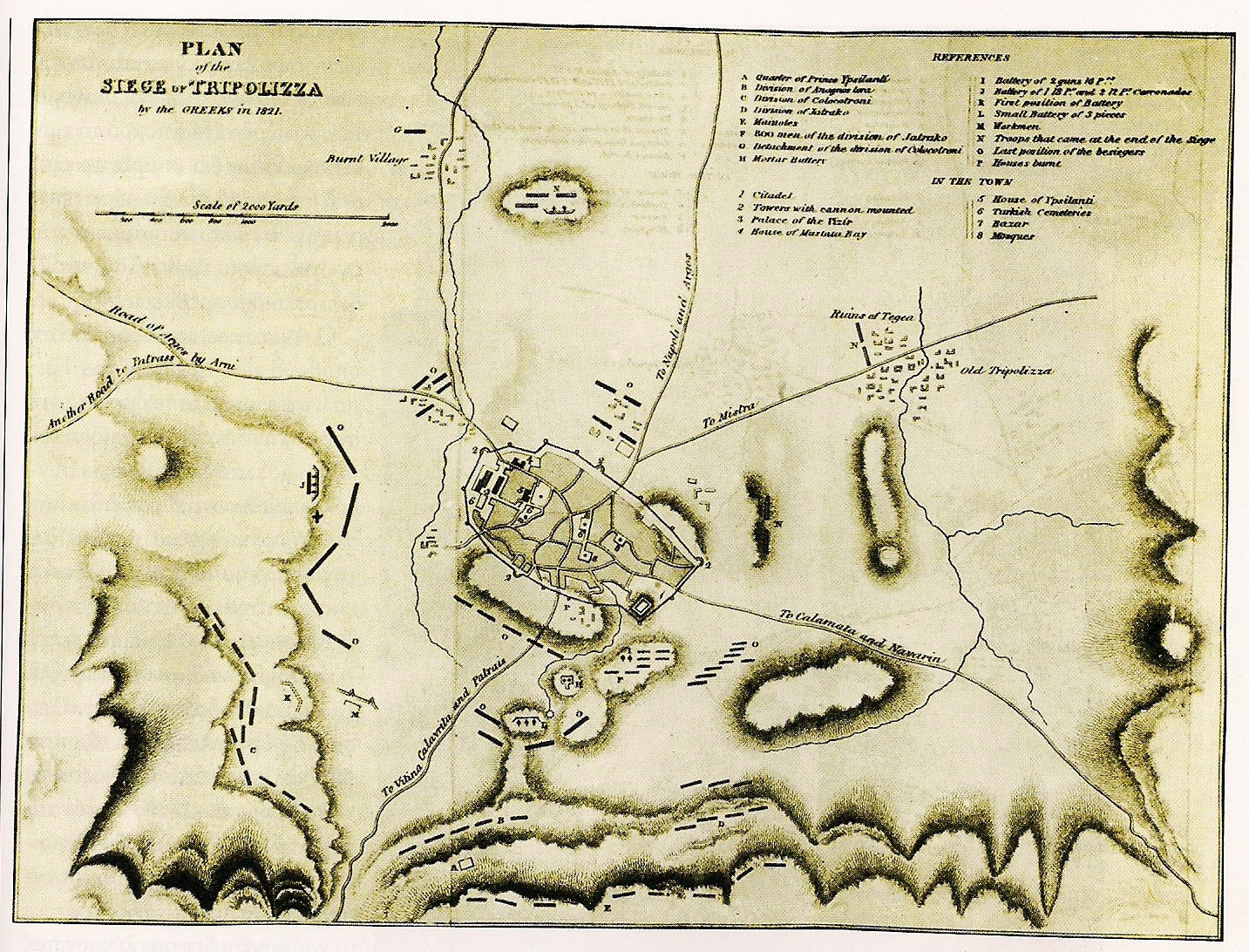
Plan of the Siege of Tripolitsa. The detachments of Kolokotronis's division, which have surrounded the town are symbolized by the letter "O".

Kolokotronis returned to the mainland just prior to the outbreak of the war in March 1821 and formed a confederation of irregular Moreot klepht bands. These he tried to train and organize into something resembling a modern army.

In May 1821, he was named archistrategos or commander-in-chief. He was already 50 years old by this time, a fact which contributed to his sobriquet O Geros tou Morea or "The Elder of Morea," whereby Morea was the contemporary name for the Peloponnese.

Kolokotronis's first action was the defense of Valtetsi, the village near Tripoli where his army was mustering. Later, he was also the Commander of the Greek forces during the Siege of Tripolitsa.

=== As liberator ===
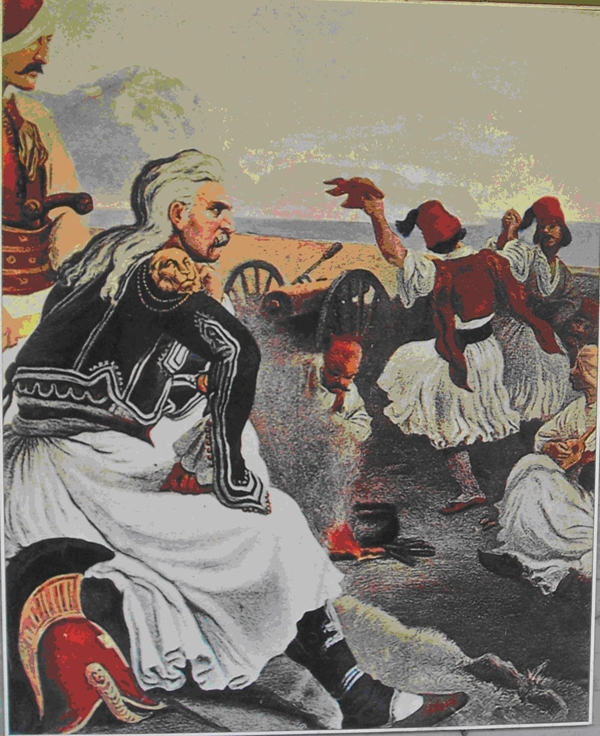
Kolokotronis after the Battle of Dervenakia.

Kolokotronis gathered the klephts together to march to the relief of Demetrios Ypsilantis. This was quite a feat in itself, considering the near-collapse of the government and the notoriously quarrelsome nature of the klephtic bands. The Ottoman army from the north commanded by Mahmud Dramali Pasha, after taking Corinth, had marched to the plain of Argos. The castle of Larissa was an excellent position, commanding the whole plain. To leave such a stronghold straddling Ottoman supply lines was far too dangerous. Dramali would have to reduce the fortress before moving on. Scaling the cliffs, breaching the castle's stout walls and overcoming its resolute defenders would be no easy task.

Yet, there was one weakness Dramali was unaware of: Larissa, unlike the Acropolis in Athens, had no spring and consequently fresh water had to be supplied from cisterns. Unfortunately for the Greeks, it was July and no rains were falling to fill the cisterns. Ypsilantis bluffed the Ottomans as long as he could, but towards the end of the month had to sneak his men out in the middle of the night. Dramali's men plundered the castle the next day, and he was now free to march them toward the coast to resupply (the Greeks had pursued a scorched earth policy, and the large Ottoman force was eating through its food supplies rather quickly). Ypsilantis's defense had bought Kolokotronis and the klephts valuable time.

To his dismay, Dramali found himself cut off from his supply fleet, which had intended to land at Nafplio but was successfully blockaded by the Greek fleet under Admiral Andreas Miaoulis.

Dramali reluctantly decided upon a retreat toward Corinth through the Dervenaki Pass, through which he had just come unmolested. This was exactly what Kolokotronis had been hoping for. In August 1822, his quicker-moving guerrilla forces trapped the Ottomans in the pass and annihilated them in the Battle of Dervenakia.

A devastated Sultan Mahmud II in Constantinople was forced to turn to Muhammad Ali, ruler of the nominally Ottoman pashaluk of Egypt, for help.

The Greeks resumed the siege against the fortresses at Nafplio, which fell in December. Kolokotronis is said to have ridden his horse up the steep slopes of Palamidi to celebrate his victory there; a statue in the town square commemorates the event. He is attired in the pseudo-classical uniform of the Greek Light Infantry, which he was fond of wearing.

=== Parliamentary crisis ===
From December 1823 to February 1825, he took part in the civil wars among the various Greek factions; when his party was finally defeated, he was jailed in Hydra with some of his followers in March 1825, and was released only when an Egyptian army under the command of Ibrahim Pasha invaded the Morea. His eldest son, Panos Kolokotronis, was killed during the second civil war.

=== Against Ibrahim ===
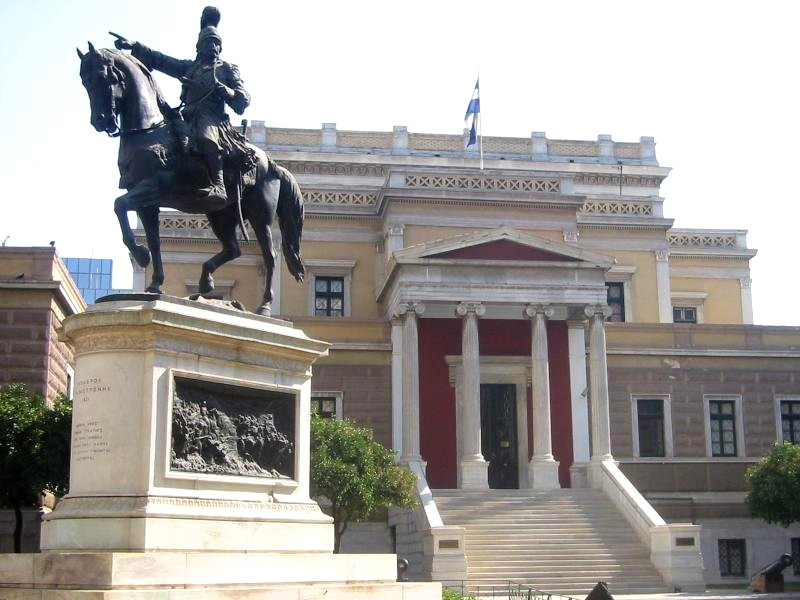
Statue of Kolokotronis in front of the Old Parliament building in Athens; work by Lazaros Sochos.

Ibrahim was fresh from fighting the Wahhabi rebels in Arabia, and so was used to fighting guerrillas. His troops were armed with the most modern equipment and trained by European experts. The sultan had promised his father the island of Crete as an appanage for young Ibrahim if he could crush the rebels. With his eye on the prize, he burned his way through the Peloponnese, gaining much territory but arousing much hostility in western European public opinion, which in the long run proved disastrous for the Ottomans.

The island of Sphacteria and Navarino had already fallen into Ibrahim's hands, and to make matters worse for Kolokotronis, he still had to be on guard against the machinations of Petros Mavromichalis even as he was bracing himself against the new threat.

Kolokotronis decided to not confront Ibrahim in an open field battle and used guerrilla tactics and scorched earth policy against him; but given his limited resources, was unable to prevent the widespread destruction that Ibrahim left in his wake. Still, in 1825, in recognition of his military acumen and many services to the Greek cause, he was appointed commander-in-chief of Greek forces in the Peloponnese.

== Postbellum activities ==
After the war, Kolokotronis became a supporter of Count Ioannis Kapodistrias and a proponent of alliance with Russia. When the count was assassinated on 8 October 1831, Kolokotronis created his own administration in support of Prince Otto of Bavaria as a King of Greece. Before Otto's arrival in Greece however, Alexandros Mavrokordatos and Ioannis Kolettis, considering Kolokotronis as an obstacle to their plans to cover the positions of power, slandered him and sent a letter to Munich that he was preparing an army in order to prevent Otto from setting foot in Greece. When Kolokotronis realized this he put on his uniform and helmet and went to Nafplio to welcome Otto and pay his respects. Then he left to a farm he had outside the city as he writes:

As much as I could I paid my debt: I saw my homeland free, I saw what I and my father and my grandfather and my whole generation and all Greeks longed for. And so I decided to go to an orchard I had outside Anapli. I went, studied and spent my time cultivating. And I was pleased to see the progress of the little trees I planted.

However, later he opposed the Bavarian-dominated regency. On 7 June 1834, he was accused, with Dimitrios Plapoutas, for conspiracy against the regency, charged with treason and sentenced to death, though they were ultimately pardoned in 1835.

Theodoros Kolokotronis died in 1843 in Athens one day after his son Konstantinos's (Kollinos) wedding and after a feast at the Royal Palace, in presence of King Otto.

He was buried in a family plot in the First Cemetery of Athens, where he remained interred until 1930, when prime minister Eleftherios Venizelos had his bones exhumed and transported to Tripoli. His bones were interred at the base of his statue in Areos Square, where they remain today.

== Epilogue ==
In the twilight of his life, Kolokotronis had learned to write in order to complete his memoirs, which constitute the second best known account of the events of the Greek Revolutionary War after the memoirs of Yannis Makriyannis, and have been translated several times in English and other languages. Kolokotronis's famed helmet, along with the rest of his arms and armor, may today be seen in the National Historical Museum of Greece in Athens. In addition to the Nafplio statue mentioned earlier, there is another to be seen in Athens, in the forecourt of the Old Parliament building on Stadiou Street, near Syntagma Square.

== Legacy ==
- Kolokotronis is also the name of military barracks near Tripoli.
- A portrait of Kolokotronis was depicted on the Greek ₯5,000 banknote of 1984–2002.
- Theodoros Kolokotronis Stadium (Greek: Γήπεδο Θεόδωρος Κολοκοτρώνης), formerly known as Asteras Tripolis Stadium, is a football stadium in Tripoli. The stadium is the home of Super League club Asteras Tripolis.

== Gallery ==
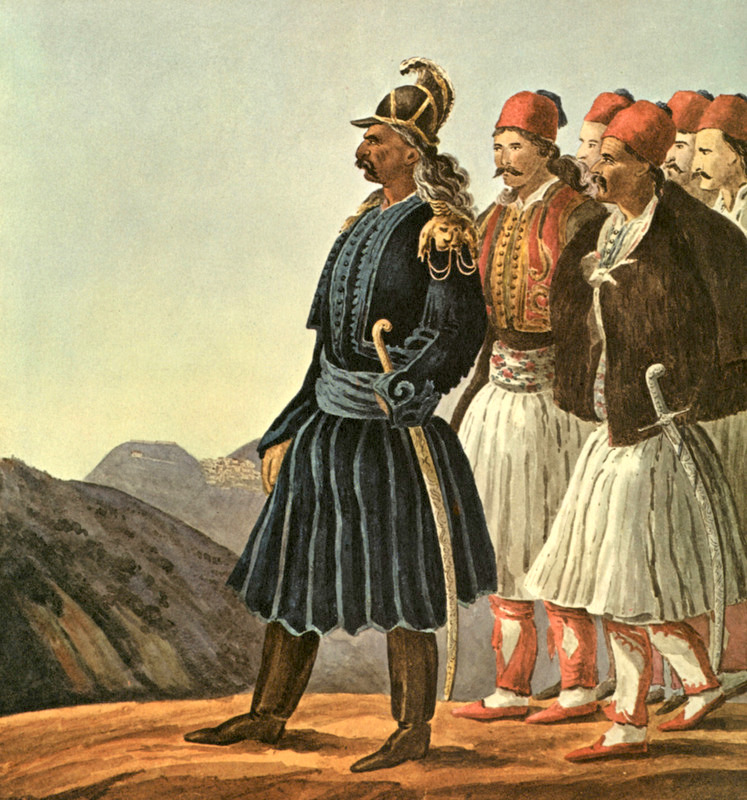
"Kololotronis and his personal escort" by Pierre Peytier

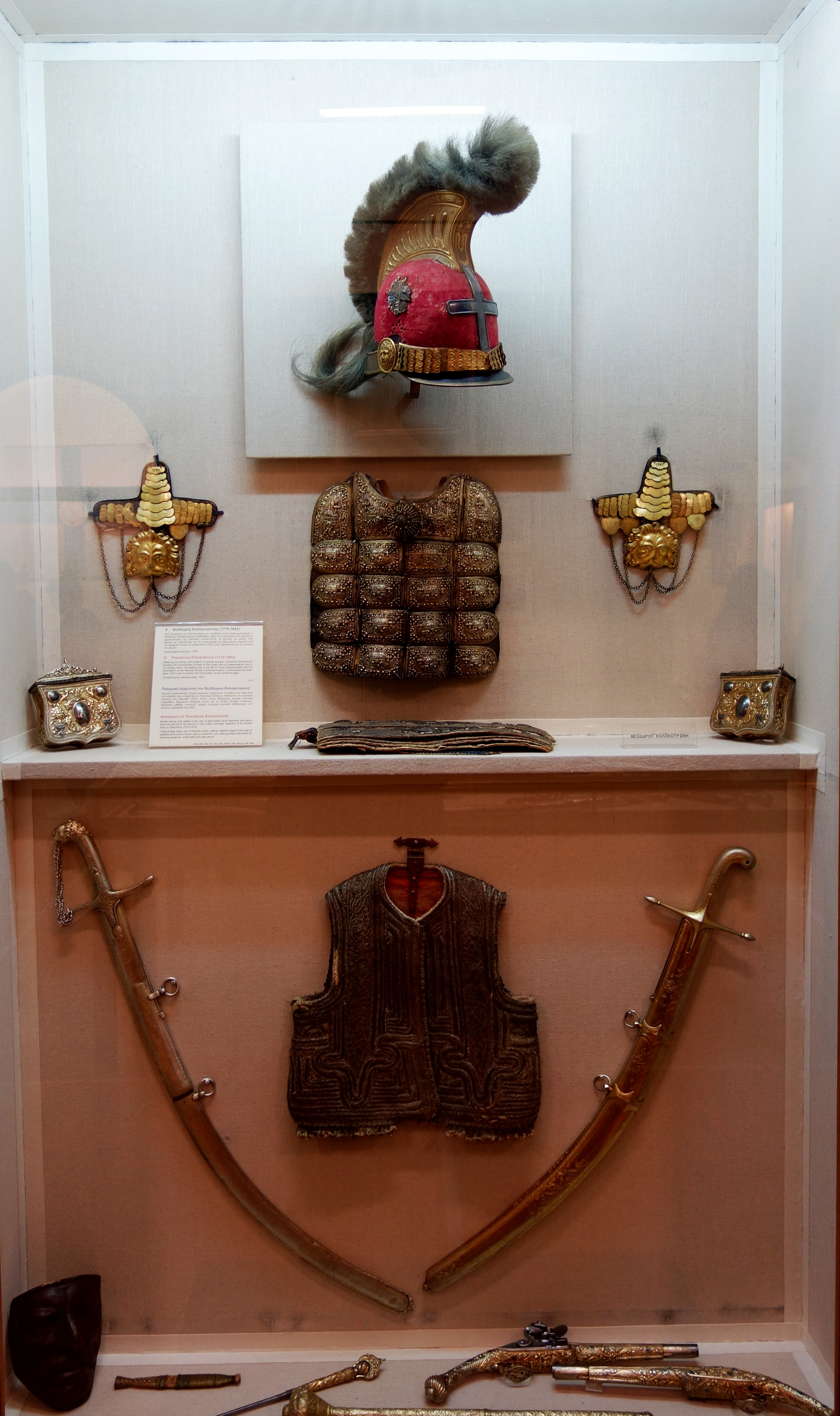
Kolokotronis' helmet, weapons and equipment, Old Parliament House

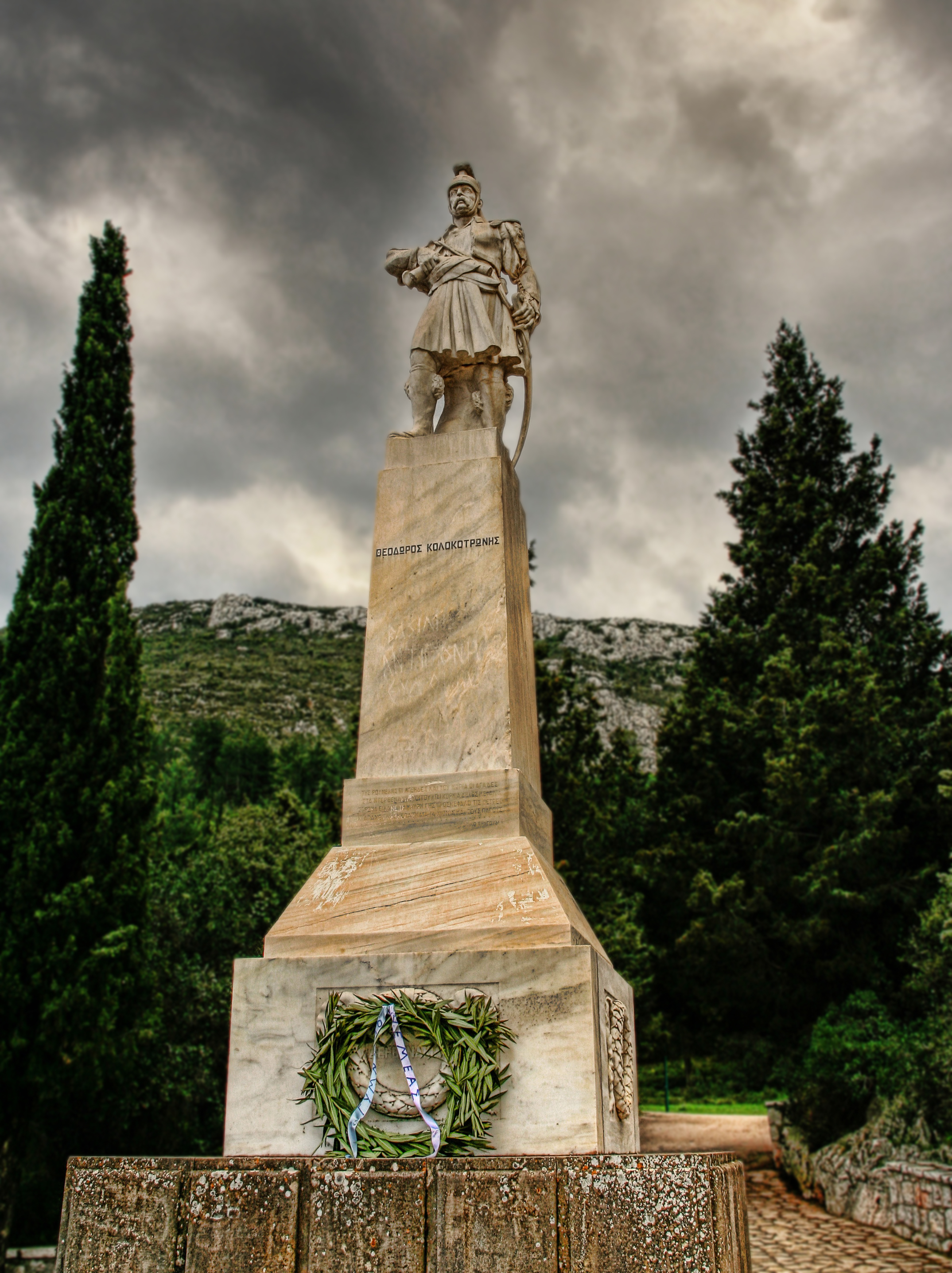
Statue of Kolokotronis at Dervenakia

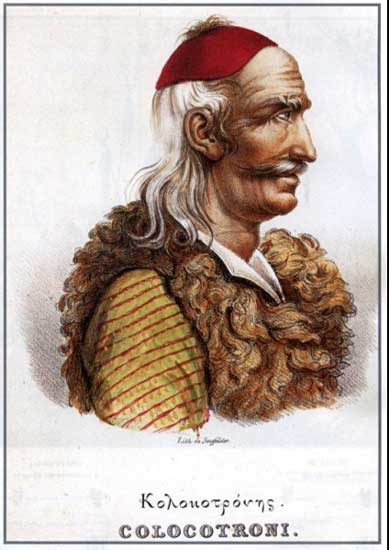
Colocotroni by Giovanni Boggi

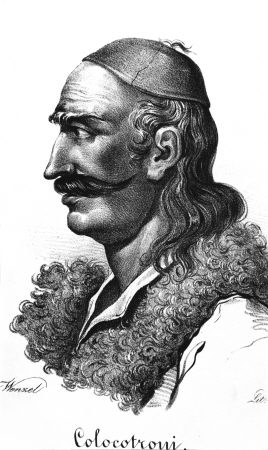
Colocotroni by François Pouqueville

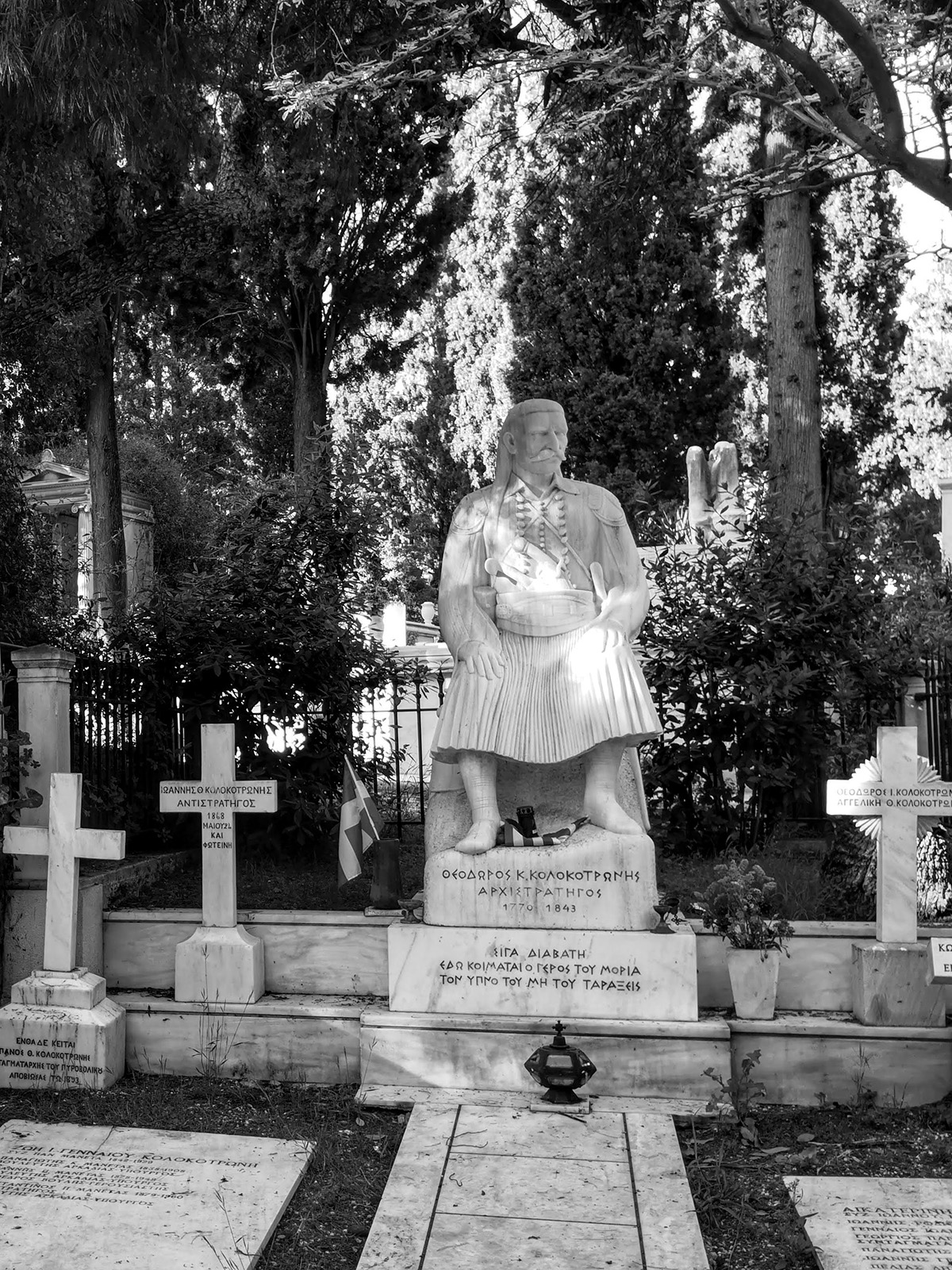
Kolokotronis's monument in the First Cemetery of Athens

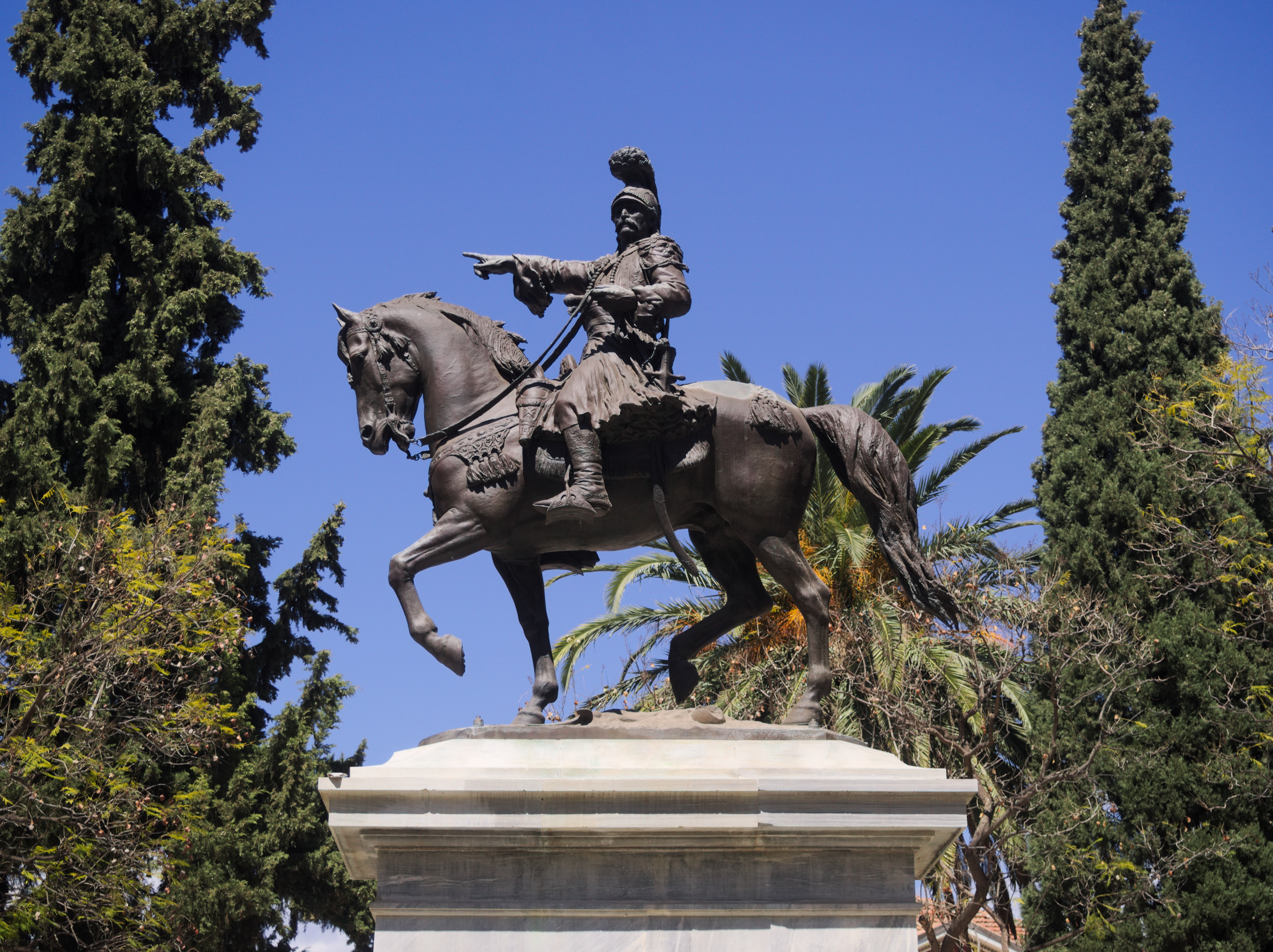
Statue in Nafplio

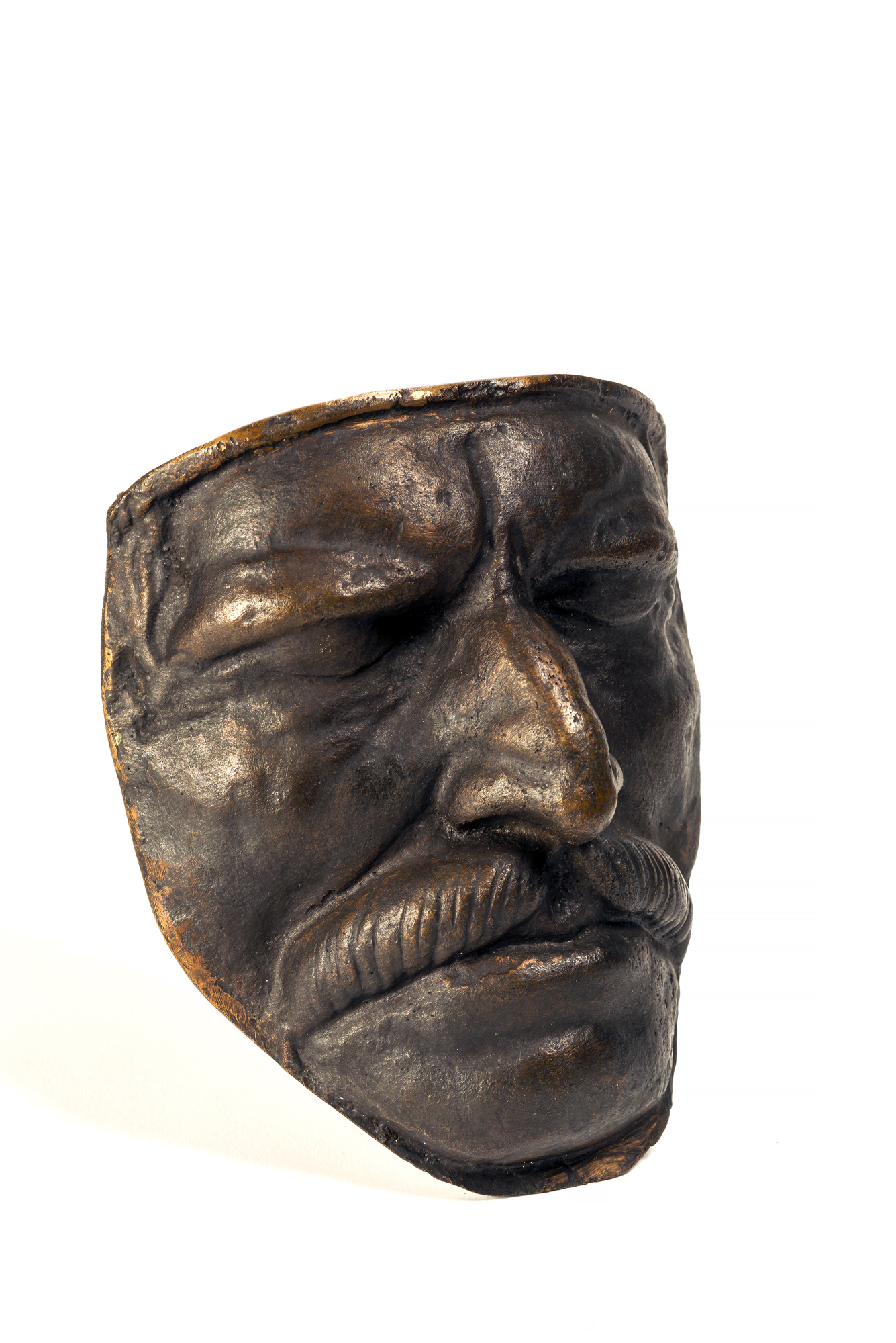
The death mask of Kolokotronis, Athens War Museum

== Sources ==
- Clogg, Richard (1976). The Movement for Greek Independence, 1770–1821: A Collection of Documents. New York: Barnes & Noble. ISBN 978-0-06-491216-7.
- Clogg, Richard (2013) [1992]. A Concise History of Greece. Cambridge and New York: Cambridge University Press. ISBN 978-1-10-765644-4.
- Keridis, Dimitris (2009). Historical Dictionary of Modern Greece. Scarecrow Press, Inc. ISBN 978-0-81-086312-5.
- Kolokotronis, Theodoros (1892). Kolokotrones. The Klepht and the Warrior. Sixty Years of Peril and Daring. An Autobiography. Translated by Edmonds, Elizabeth M. London: T. Fisher Unwin.
- The Greeks: The Triumphant Journey, From the Ancient Greeks and the Greek Revolution of 1821, to Greek Americans. New York: The National Herald. 2001. ISBN 9789608711907.
- Pappas, Paul Constantine (1985). The United States and the Greek War for Independence, 1821–1828. Boulder: East European Monographs. ISBN 978-0-88-033065-7.
- Stavrianos, L.S. (1963). "The Influence of the West on the Balkans". In Jelavich, Charles; Jelavich, Barbara (eds.). The Balkans in Transition: Essays on the Development of Balkan Life and Politics Since the Eighteenth Century. Berkeley and Los Angeles: University of California Press. pp. 184–226.
