= Douglas Dakin =

- Born: 13 July 1907; Gloucestershire, England
- Died: 20 July 1995 (aged 88); Gloucester, England
- Citizenship: British
- Awards: Golden Cross of the Order of the Phoenix
- Scientific career
- Fields: History, Neohellenic Studies

Douglas Dakin (13 July 1907 – 20 July 1995) was a British historian, academic and professor emeritus of Birkbeck College, University of London (1935–1974). He is especially known for his work in the Neohellenic Studies field, in which he devoted the greatest part of his study and research, especially focusing on the Greek Revolution through the mid-20th century period.

== Biography ==
=== Early life and studies ===
Dakin was born in Gloucestershire, England, the son of a village schoolmaster. When, in 1920, Rendcomb College was founded near Cirencester, his father sent him there to study. In 1926 Dakin went up to Peterhouse, Cambridge, with an open scholarship, where he studied history and graduated with a first-class degree. He started teaching for the first time in 1931, at Haberdashers' Aske's School, London. Dakin then began his PhD, on Anne-Robert-Jacques Turgot, at Birkbeck College.

=== Academic career and World War II ===
In 1935, Dakin was appointed lecturer in history at Birkbeck College. Though his Turgot and the Ancien Régime work was published in 1939, a distinguished achievement for a scholar of his age, his main academic interests shifted from France to modern Greece; the cause of this was Dakin's military service during World War II in Greece. Dakin had joined the Royal Air Force Volunteer Reserve (RAFVR) and served in Egypt and Greece as the liaison officer to the Royal Hellenic Air force and also had been involved with the Greek People's Liberation Army (ELAS). In 1945 he returned to the UK from the Middle East and was posted in the Allied/Foreign Liaison Section of the British Air Ministry.

=== Neohellenic studies ===
After the end of the war, Dakin returned to Birkbeck College where additional duties as an archivist were assigned to him. He faced bureaucracy with humour and parallel to his popular night classes on the post-Napoleonic Congress system and his supervisory duties of postgraduate students, acquiring for both the fame of an enlightened and respected teacher. His main work centered on modern Greek history for which Paul, king of Greece, awarded him the Golden Cross of the Order of the Phoenix; Dakin was also named an honorary doctor of the Aristotle University of Thessaloniki in 1969 and a corresponding member of the Athens Academy from 1971. Following the foundation of the University of Cyprus, Dakin donated to it a big part of its book collection, consisting of about 850 titles; he then became and remained involved with the Cypriot Centre for Scientific Studies.

== Selected works ==
- Turgot and the ancien régime in France (1939)
- Documents on British foreign policy. First series. (1955)
- British and American philhellenes during the War of Greek Independence, 1821–1833 (1955)
- A Short History of Modern Greece, 1821–1957 (1957 With E.S. Forster)
- British intelligence of events in Greece, 1824–1827 (1957)
- The Greek Struggle in Macedonia 1897–1913. (1966, 1993)
- The Unification Of Greece, 1770–1923 (1972)
- Documents on British Foreign Policy, 1919–1939 (1973 with W.N. Medlicott and Gillian Bennett)
- The Greek Struggle for Independence, 1821–1833 (1973)
- The Congress of Vienna, 1814–1815 and its Antecedents in Alan Sked, ed., Europe's Balance of Power 1815–1848 (1979 London: Macmillan)

== Dakin Prize ==
Dakin's family has established an annual prize for Birkbeck College students who excel in history, in memory of him; as the college's webpage reads:

The best history degree each year is awarded the Dakin Prize, established by his family in memory of Professor Douglas Dakin, Professor of History at Birkbeck from 1935–1974. Another Dakin Prize is awarded, as appropriate, for personal achievement to a finalist who has overcome particular difficulties to obtain his or her degree.
