= Mavromichalis (surname) =

Mavromichalis is a surname. Notable people with the surname include:

- Petrobey Mavromichalis (1765–1848), Greek general and politician
- Kyriakoulis Mavromichalis (1850–1916), Greek politician
- Constantinos Mavromichalis (born 1987), Finnish actor
- Kyriakoulis Mavromichalis (military commander), Greek revolutionary
- Stylianos Mavromichalis (1899–1981), Greek politician
- Konstantinos Mavromichalis, Greek politician and military commander during the Greek War of Independence
- Demetrios Mavromichalis (1809–1882), Greek politician and military personnel
- Antonios Mavromichalis (1792–1873), Greek revolutionary, military officer and politician
- Georgios Mavromichalis, Greek assassin
- Periklis Pierrakos-Mavromichalis (1863–1938), Greek military officer
- Anastasios Mavromichalis, Greek politician and soldier
- Pierros Mavromichalis
- Fotini Mavromichali, Greek court office holder and royal mistress

== See also ==
- Mavromichalis family
