= Ilias Mavromichalis =

Greek Revolutionary

- Ηλίας Μαυρομιχάλης
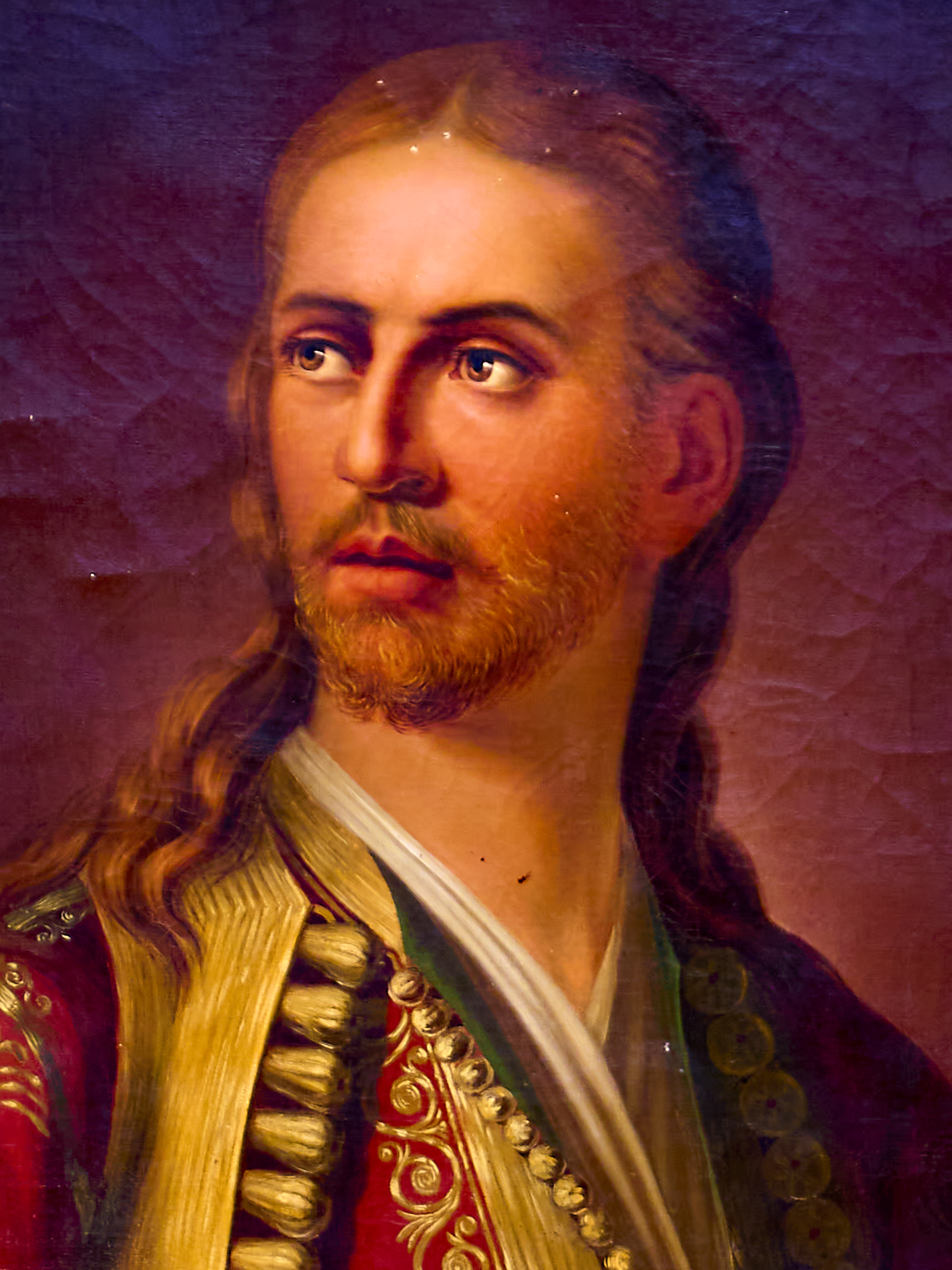
- A portrait of Ilias Mavromichalis
- Born: 3 April 1795; Mani Peninsula, Morea Eyalet, Ottoman Empire (now Greece)
- Died: 12 January 1822 (aged 26); Styra, Euboea, Ottoman Empire (now Greece)
- Relatives: Petrobey Mavromichalis (father); Fotini Dimitrakarakou (mother); Panagiotitsa Mavromichali (sister); Georgios Mavromichalis (brother); Anastasios Mavromichalis (brother); Ioannis P. Mavromichalis (brother); Demetrios Mavromichalis (brother)
- Military career
- Allegiance: Revolutionary Greece
- Branch: Hellenic Army
- Rank: Chieftain
- Nicknames: Bezande-Ilias; Μπεζαντές-Ηλίας
- Conflicts: Greek War of Independence; Siege of Tripolitsa; Battle of Valtetsi; Battle of Styra
- Other work: Member of the Filiki Etaireia

Ilias Mavromichalis or Bezande-Ilias (1795 - 1822) was a fighter of the Greek Revolution of 1821 and scion of the historic family of Mavromichali. He went down in history as the "Fairyborn" chieftain due to his beauty - which according to popular tradition he inherited from his grandmother (daughter of the Doge of Venice, Francesco Morosini).

Also known by the nickname "Bezande" (beyizade, son of the bey in Turkish) to distinguish him from his cousin of the same name, who was nicknamed Katsakos. His self-sacrifice at Styra in Euboea, on January 12, 1822, had all the characteristics of the heroic death of an ancient Spartan warrior. It was the first loss of a high-ranking member of the Revolution from the Peloponnese.

== Biography ==
He was born in Mani and was the eldest son of Petrobey Mavromichalis and Fotini Dimitrakarakou. Ilias was one of the first in the Peloponnese to be initiated into the Filiki Eteria. He represented the Peloponnesians in the pre-revolutionary assembly of chieftains in Lefkada. At the beginning of the war, he took part in the liberation of Kalamata where, as the leader of the Maniates, he succeeded in liberating the city without a fight, in the Battle of Valtetsi, Arcadia (12-13 May 1821) where he distinguished himself, together with his uncle Kyriakoulis, for his strategic virtues and boldness, he also took part in the Siege of Tripolitsa, the Siege of Acrocorinth, the Siege of the Acropolis and battles in Euboea, where he was sent with his uncle Kyriakoulis to assist Bishop of Karystos Neophytos and the chieftains Mavrovouniotis and Kriezotis.

When he was appointed chief of the Arms of Attica, in November 1821, he was renowned as the warlord with the Doric style and Apollonian aspect. He went down in history as the "Fairyborn" chieftain. According to popular tradition, he owed his extraordinary beauty to his grandmother - who was the daughter of the Doge of Venice, Francesco Morosini. His grandfather, Giorgakis Mavromichalis, had found her unconscious on the rocks of Mani, left there by a pirate ship with which her father had fled, because she was in danger from her stepmother.

The youthful enthusiasm, bravery and philanthropy that characterized Ilias Mavromichali were paid for with his own life. His death caused deep sadness, depriving the Revolution of a very important leader, gifted at the same time with excellent diplomatic skills, at only 26 years of age. Ioannis Filimon writes: "if Doris he lost Athanasios Diakos, Laconia also he lost Ilias Mavromichali".

== Sources ==
- Σύγχρονος Εγκυκλοπαίδεια Ελευθερουδάκη, τόμος 17, σελ. 231, έκδοσις πέμπτη δια συμπληρώματος κατά τόμον.
- Χρίστος Δρακούλη Γούδης: Λόγος για τη Μάνη,εκδόσεις Αδούλωτη Μάνη, σελ 51-53.
- Φιλήμων, Ι. (1861). Δοκίμιον ιστορικόν περί της Ελληνικής Επαναστάσεως, Τόμος 4. Αθήνα: Εκ του τυπογραφείου Π.Β. Μωραϊτίνη.
- Φωτιάδης, Δ., Η επανάσταση του 1821, Εκδόσεις Ζαχαρόπουλος Σ. Ι., Αθήνα 2018.
- Παπαρρηγόπουλος, Κ., Ιστορία Ελληνικού Έθνους, τ.6, Εκδόσεις Ελευθερουδάκη, Αθήνα 1930.
- Τερτσέτης, Γ., Ο γέρων Κολοκοτρώνης. Διήγησις συμβάντων της ελληνικής φυλής από τα 1770 έως τα 1836, Εκδόσεις Τύποις Χ. Νικολαϊδου Φιλαδελφέως, Αθήνα 1851.
- Κόκκινος, Δ., Η Ελληνική Επανάστασις, τ.2, σελ. 416–419, 6η έκδοση, Εκδόσεις Μέλισσα, Αθήνα 1974.
- Καπετανάκης, Σ., Οι Μανιάτες στην Επανάσταση του 1821, Εκδόσεις Εταιρείας Λακωνικών Σπουδών, Αθήνα 2015.
- Μπόπης, Δημήτριος, «ΗΛΙΑΣ ΜΑΥΡΟΜΙΧΑΛΗΣ (1795-1822) Ο «Νεραϊδογέννητος» Οπλαρχηγός», ΣΤΡΑΤΙΩΤΙΚΗ ΙΣΤΟΡΙΑ, τεύχος 289 (09/2021), Εκδόσεις Γκοβόστη (eBook).
