= Petros Mavromichalis (1819–1852) =

Greek soldier and politician (1819–1852)

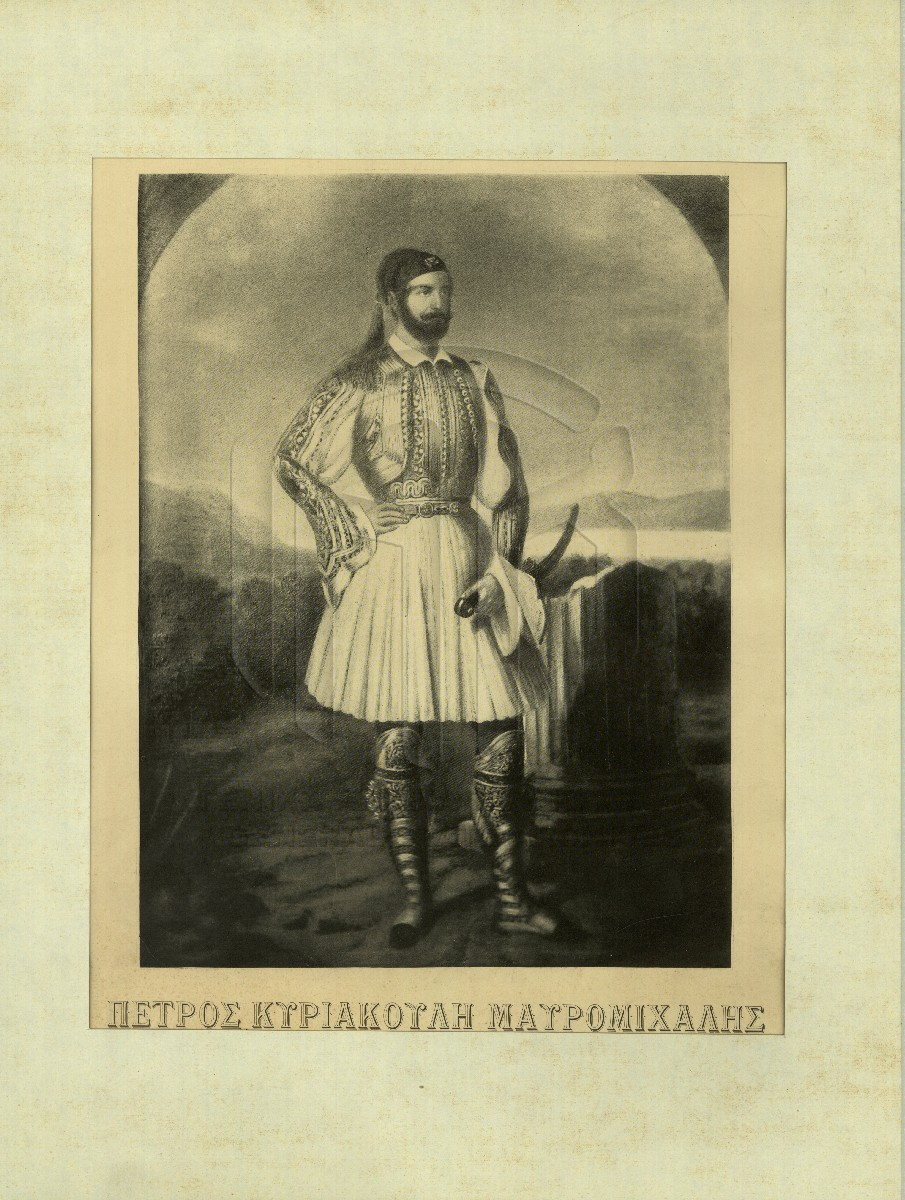
- Born: 1819; Mani, Messenia, Peloponnese, Ottoman Empire
- Died: 1852 (aged 32–33); Athens, Kingdom of Greece
- Occupations: Military; politician

Petros Mavromichalis (1819–1852) was a military man and politician from Mani. He was a member of parliament for Oitylo in 1847.

== Life ==
He was born in Mani and was the son of Kyriakoulis Mavromichalis, brother of Petrobey. He followed the military profession, graduating from the Military School of Evelpidon. He took part in the revolution of 1843, and was sent several times to suppress uprisings in the region of Laconia; in 1848 he was the leader of the Laconian corps in Euboea.

In 1847 he was elected MP for Oitylo, where he continued to be elected for many years. His children were:

- Roxani Mavromichali (1848–1905), married with Thrasyvoulos Manos, general, and had a child:
  - Petros Manos, colonel, married with Maria Argyropoulou (daughter of Iakovos, consul of Greece in Smyrna and ambassador of Greece in Belgrade) and had a child:
    - Aspasia Manos, married with Alexander, King of Greece
      - Alexandra, Queen of Yugoslavia, married with Peter II of Yugoslavia
        - Alexander, Crown Prince of Yugoslavia
- Kyriakoulis Mavromichalis (1850–1916), Prime Minister of Greece, married with Lina Roma and his children:
  - Leonidas Mavromichalis, politician
  - Petros Mavromichalis, politician
