= Valtetsi (village) =

Valtetsi Βαλτέτσι
- Community
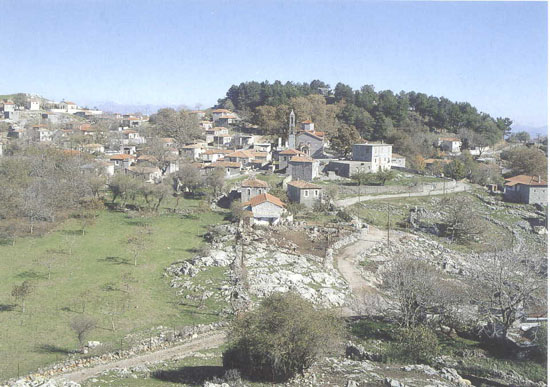

- Location within Greece
- Coordinates: 37°28′39″N 22°17′5″E
- Country: Greece
- Administrative region: Peloponnese
- Regional unit: Arcadia
- Municipality: Tripoli
- Municipal unit: Valtetsi

Population (2021)
  - Community: 70
- Time zone: UTC+2 (EET)
  - Summer (DST): UTC+3 (EEST)

Valtetsi (Greek: Βαλτέτσι) is a village in the municipal unit of Valtetsi, Arcadia, Greece. It is located in the Central Peloponessus in what is called Ορεινή Αρκαδία (Greek: Mountainous Arcadia) at a distance of 12 km west of Tripoli and an altitude of 1,050 m. It is a small plain terrain surrounded by four hills: Chomatovouni, Mylos, Katsikeika and Dovrouleika. It is considered a traditional settlement.

== Historical Synopsis ==
Valtetsi used to be an isolated place, connected to other villages with three narrow paths only, each one guiding to the major mounts in the region: one to the Taygetus, other to the Menalus and the third to the Parnon. This is possibly the reason why it was one of the most famous dens chosen by klephtes and brigands.

It soon became characterized by a strong common ethic code which was strictly guarded by the Valtetsiotes, who were renowned as warlike highlanders with an austere way of life and love for Greek tradition and Christian faith.

Everyday life was extremely hard since cattle keeping (mostly sheep and also some goats) was the local profession for ordinary villagers. The typical family lived in a constant move. When it was not the Ottoman occupant's menace it was the strong winter which obliged shepherds to take their herds to milder weathers and pastures in the Argolid returning to Valtetsi in April. When September arrived, they started the herd's move again, this time to the summer camps in Tegea and Dimitsana. The existence of nearby marshes, worsened the living conditions up to a level that a strong dengue epidemic struck the village even at the beginning of the Twentieth century.

The pastoral way of living was kept for nearly 400 years until the early 1950s. The negative impacts of the Second World War and the Greek Civil War, which impoverished the region to an extent of very difficult subsistence, and the advent of modernization with the boom of urban life made younger generations to flee for new experiences at first towards nearby cities in the Argolid, second to Athens, Greece's capital city (notably in some of the neighbourhoods of Piraeus like Kastela or Palaio Faliro) and in the end overseas abroad to America being the United States, Canada and Argentina the three main places chosen as destinations.

The disaster that both wars caused in the region, slowly overcame as the rest of Greece with the help of the Marshall Plan and the doctrine of rebuilding Europe. With the accession of the country to the European Union, progress arrived to the villages, mainly in terms of communication. New roads and tunnels were built with European funds and telephone netting plus TV provision finished with centuries of isolation.

Today's Valtetsi is a touristic attraction, showing the typical highland mountain village with a number of nearly 300 people living. When the month of the Anniversary of the Greek War of Independence arrives, a new revolution, takes place with historical re-enactments and special celebrations which are attended by national and regional political celebrities.

== Valtetsi during the Greek War of Independence ==
In 1821, when the Greek War of Independence broke out, Valtetsi became the key headquarters of the revolutionary army. The short distance within the village and Tripolis -which being the capital of the Ottoman vilayet of Morea became the main objective of the rebels- and the topographic characteristics of the place made Theodoros Kolokotronis to choose it as his stronghold prior to the final assault.

The Maniots, under the leadership of Kyriakoulis Mavromichalis and with the help of the local villagers, succeeded in fortifying the four hilltops by building small housetowers and installing defensive batteries. During the Battle of Valtetsi, the combined action of the Maniot warriors and the local brigands helped the Greek side to win the battle and to take effective control nearly half of the Peloponessus.

Prior to the Siege of Tripolitsa, Petros Mavromichalis, the commander-in-chief and bey of Mani arrived to the village with a strong army and camped at Valtetsi, establishing the Maniot seat of campaign and headquarters for the first time since the medieval period outside the limits of Laconia. During the siege itself, the Valtetsiotes fought under the command of Petrobey and took part in the capture of the city.

In the following years, with the liberation of Greece, Valtetsi remained very close to Kolokotronis' affections. All the villages in the mountainous Arcadia and Valtetsi in particular were extremely loyal to the military party and their leaders such as the proper Kolokotronis, Nikitaras or the Mavromichaleoi against the civil party of Alexandros Mavrokordatos and the Aromanian blooded Kolettis, what made them to staunchly oppose the Bavarian regency as well as the Capodistrian government which they saw as undermining the local regional interests in behalf of centralization of power following Adamantios Korais' principles of a national, western, unitarian and homogenous state.

== Valtetsi during World War II and the Greek Civil War ==
The Second World War and the subsequent Axis occupation brought a desperate situation to Valtetsi due to the village economic dependence from the trading markets in the City of Tripolis. Since most of the sheep and goats were confiscated by the Nazi occupants, the lack of food and the inflation made everyday life very difficult for the villagers because they could not manufacture the goods and products derived from these animals like milk, butter, cheese and furs. This way they were unable to buy other essential goods such as bread, farine or oil and medicine.

Resistance was also heavy in the zone, where many British and New Zealander soldiers were hidden or sheltered by villagers. A nationalist branch of the resistance movement, led by a former Troezenian officer in the Hellenic Army named Apostolos Kouvelakis was very supported by the local population. After each operation German razzias were common due to the evil work of collaborationist informants and they generally finished with brutal reprisals such as shootings and house burnings.

By 1944, the majority of the 1500 people of the village had relocated in nearby places such as Ermioni and Troezen. Those who stayed had to face another major problem that was already growing inside the whole Greece: The Civil War. Besides the non-marxist resistance fronts, communist partisans were also active, notably the EAM-ELAS. With the Nazi occupation over, after the liberation a vacuum of power was created in most rural areas. Communist chieftains started to campaign village by village so as to obtain adherents of their so-called liberation army and fight the British-backed governmental troops.

The communist partisans "liberated" Valtetsi in May 1944 under the command of kapetan Fotis Gatsopoulos. Immediately he gave orders to confiscate the church and the main houses to make their own headquarters. For the EAM members, Valtetsi was considered a royalist stronghold because only a few people accepted to be named as Village Guardians. Immediately they started to chase down those persons who were known for having relatives abroad, mainly the ones in the United States that were labelled as reactionaries or monarcho-fascists. When an order of massive execution was given the whole population rebelled against the partisans and expelled them from the village.

In the morning of June 15, 1944, a strong battle between the ELAS communist andartes, under the command of Aris Velouchiotis (one of the main ELAS commanders), and the Valtetsiotes took place. The villagers, peasants and shepherds fought against the communist forces but outnumbered and badly equipped were defeated. The communists recaptured the village and burned nearly a half of the houses. They gathered most of the population taken prisoners in the church's yard and started shooting with no distinction of men, women and children. Most of the population was decimated. Other inhabitants were brought (or had been previously brought) to EAM's concentration camps, among which the very infamous one located by the monastery of Ay. Georgios on the eastern slopes of Helmos mountain near Pheneos, where the executers operated as throats-cutters. By the time the Hellenic Army freed the village a couple of months later, Valtetsi was about to become a ghost place.

== Places of interest ==
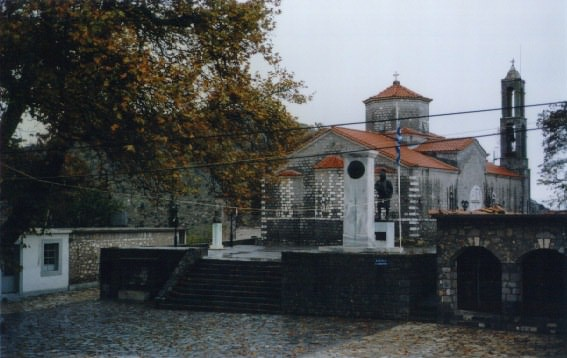

- The Church of the Dormition of the Theotokos (Εκκλησία Κοίμησης Θεοτόκου) was built in 1837 under the command of Theodoros Kolokotronis and was dedicated to the Holy Virgin Mary, for Her guidance throughout the whole War of Independence. In the same place where it is located today, there was a small chapel that the revolutionaries used for praying for the Divine assistance prior to the Battle of Valtetsi. In the construction, people form the nearby villages participated. Marble and stones were taken from the nearby mountains Kalogeriko and Rezeniko.
- The Folklorical and Ethnological Museum whose building was the house of the local chieftain Stavros Tzavaras, shows a wide variety of instruments, typical dresses and valuable objects such as ancient pictures where the visitor may glance at the way of living of the villagers throughout the different years. A special section is dedicated to the 1821 Revolution and their heroes.

- The Historical Tree of Kolokotronis is an old platanus located in the central square of the village where according to the legend, the archistratigos sat under the shadow and planned the whole operation of the Siege of Tripolitsa. It is said that he gave to each of his kapetaneoi the special commands under this historical tree. The myth tells that under the shade of the old platanus the future of the whole modern Greece was decided.

== See also ==
- List of settlements in Arcadia
- List of traditional settlements of Greece
