= Anastasios Mavromichalis =

Greek politician and soldier

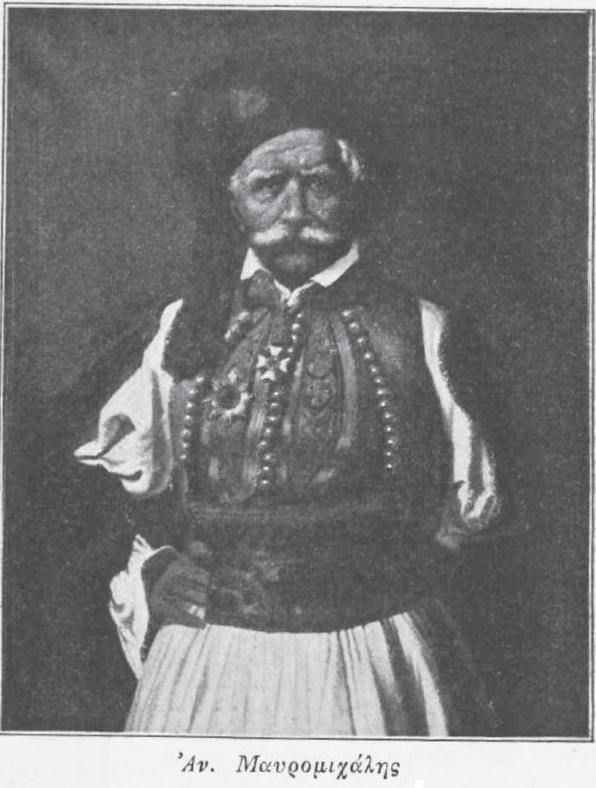
- Born: 1798; Mani, Morea Eyalet, Ottoman Empire (now Greece)
- Died: 1870 (~aged 72); Frankish Tower, Athens, First Hellenic Republic
- Occupations: Politician, Military personnel
- Children: Petros A. Mavromichalis
- Parent(s): Petrobey Mavromichalis; Fotini Dimitrakarakou
- Relatives: Ilias Mavromichalis (brother); Panagiotitsa Mavromichali (sister); Georgios Mavromichalis (brother); Ioannis P. Mavromichalis (brother); Demetrios Mavromichalis (brother)

Anastasios Mavromichalis (Greek: Αναστάσιος Μαυρομιχάλης, 1798–1870) was a fighter of the Greek War of Independence. He was a politician, senator and minister of the newly established Greek state.

== Biography ==
He was born in Mani and was the second son of Petrobey Mavromichalis. In 1818 he was sent as a hostage to Constantinople and was initiated into the Filiki Eteria. Together with his brother Georgios Mavromichalis, they were under the protection of Patriarch Grigorios V. Shortly before the outbreak of the revolution he returned to Mani to take part in the conflicts, but almost immediately he was sent by his father to Tripoli as a hostage to the Turkish Kaymakam of Tripolitsa. With him someone Peloponnesian proestoi and some high priests were sent as hostages. In September 1821, with the fall of Tripoli, he was released and returned to Mani. He then took part in the battles against Ibrahim in Verga and Diros in 1826.

He was distinguished for his peaceful and moderate character and worked under Augustinos Kapodistrias for the cessation of the persecution of his family. He later joined the navy and rose to the rank of rear admiral. He was King Otto Hypaspists while in 1844 and 1847 he was elected deputy of Oitylo. During the period 1850-1861 he served as a senator while in the governments of Kountouriotis and Kanaris he had taken over the portfolio of the Ministry of Education and the Military respectively, from October 1848 to April 1849.

He died in Athens in 1870 and had four children, Fotini, Giannoukos, Konstantinos and Petros, by his wife Chrysiida Pagoni, sister of the Metropolitan of Argolis Gerasimos Pagonis.

== Sources ==
- Σύγχρονος Εγκυκλοπαίδεια Ελευθερουδάκη, τόμος 17ος, σελ. 231 (1928)
- http://www.mani.org.gr/istor/mavrom/anastasios.htm
- http://www.hellenicaworld.com/Greece/Person/gr/AnastasiosMavromichalis.html
