= Pierros Mavromichalis =

- Born: 1730; Mani, Messenia, Peloponnese, Ottoman Empire
- Died: 1800 (aged 70); Peloponnese, Ottoman Empire
- Known for: Orlov revolt
- Spouse: Katerina Koutsogrigorakou
- Children: Petrobey; Ioannis; Kyriakoulis; Konstantinos; Dimitrios; Antonios
- Father: Georgakis Mavromichalis

Pierros or Ilias Mavromichalis (1730–1800) was a Greek soldier of the historical family of the Mavromichali.

== Biography ==
He was born in Mani and was the son of Georgakis Mavromichalis. He was named Pierros because of the maniatic (laconic) custom of naming those who exercise guardianship over their minor children on behalf of their brothers. He belonged to one of the most powerful families in Moria and had gained great power.

To occupy the Turks after the battles of Melipyrgos and Almyros, which had forced the Maniates to retreat and take refuge for the safety of their families in the inaccessible caves of Taygetos, he fortified himself with 36 men in a coastal tower of Verga, where he repelled two days the Turkish attacks. However, lacking water and munitions, he finally made a heroic exit with his men, with only his sword through the enemy.

However, he and only one of his companions were saved from this operation. Arriving at the camp of the Maniats in Almyros, he announced the events and a general attack was decided against the army of Hatzi Osman. Indeed 4,000 Maniates descended from the mountain above Almyros, "Selitsa" and attempted a sudden night attack, pursuing the Turks as far as Kalamata. About 700 Turks were killed in this operation.

Pierros also took part in the Orlov revolt where he was killed, fighting the Albanians who had descended on the Peloponnese.

He was married with Katerina Koutsogrigorakou and his children were: Petrobey, Ioannis, Kyriakoulis, Konstantinos, Dimitrios and Antonios.

== Sources ==
- Νεώτερον Εγκυκλοπαιδικόν Λεξικόν Ηλίου τ.13ος, σ.122.
