= Periklis Pierrakos-Mavromichalis =

Greek military officer (1863–1938)

Perikis Pierrakos-Mavromichalis
- Περικλής Πιερράκος Μαυρομιχάλης
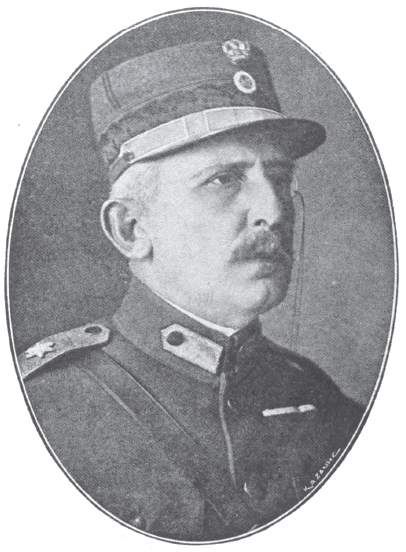
- Pierrakos-Mavromichalis c. 1922

Member of the Greek Senate
- In office 1929
- President: Pavlos Kountouriotis
- Prime Minister: Eleftherios Venizelos

Minister of Military Affairs
- In office 1924
- President: Pavlos Kountouriotis
- Prime Minister: Eleftherios Venizelos; Georgios Kafantaris; Alexandros Papanastasiou; Themistoklis Sofoulis; Andreas Michalakopoulos

Minister of the Interior
- In office 1922–1923
- Monarch: George II
- Prime Minister: Nikolaos Triantafyllakos; Anastasios Charalambis; Sotirios Krokidas; Stylianos Gonatas

Personal details
- Born: 1863 Mani, Kingdom of Greece
- Died: 1938 (aged 74–75) Athens, Kingdom of Greece
- Relations: Antonios Mavromichalis (father); Petrobey Mavromichalis (uncle); Konstantinos Mavromichalis (uncle); Kyriakoulis Mavromichalis (uncle); Georgios Mavromichalis (cousin); Demetrios Mavromichalis (cousin); Kyriakoulis Mavromichalis (nephew)
- Education: Hellenic Army Academy

Military service
- Allegiance: Kingdom of Greece
- Branch/service: Hellenic Army
- Years of service: ?-1922
- Rank: Lieutenant General
- Battles/wars: Greco-Turkish War (1897) Balkan Wars; First Balkan War; Second Balkan War; World War I; Macedonian front; Greco-Turkish War (1919–1922)

Periklis Pierrakos-Mavromichalis (Greek: Περικλής Πιερράκος Μαυρομιχάλης; 1863 – 1938), also known as Mavromichalis-Pierrakos, was a Greek military officer and politician.

== Biography ==
He was the son of general Antonios Mavromichalis, of the famed Maniot Pierrakos (Mavromichalis) family. He became an officer in the Hellenic Army, fighting in the Greco-Turkish War of 1897, the Balkan Wars, World War I (as Lt Colonel) and later in the Asia Minor Campaign, reaching the rank of Lt General. After retirement, he entered politics, serving as Interior Minister in 1922–1923 and Minister for Military Affairs in 1924. He was subsequently elected into the Greek Senate in 1929.

Periklis Pierrakos-Mavromichalis also competed at the 1896 Summer Olympics in Athens.

Medal record

Men's Fencing

Representing Greece

Olympic Games
Bronze medal – third place	1896 Athens	Foil

Pierrakos-Mavromichalis won the bronze medal in the amateur foil event. In the preliminary round, he went 2-1 in his group. He lost to Henri Callot, the eventual silver medallist, but defeated Henri Delaborde and Ioannis Poulos to finish second in the group. There was no match between him and Athanasios Vouros, who had placed second in the other group; Pierrakos-Mavromichalis was awarded third place because his record of 2-1 in matches was better than Vouros's 1-1.
