= Mavromichalis family =

Greek family

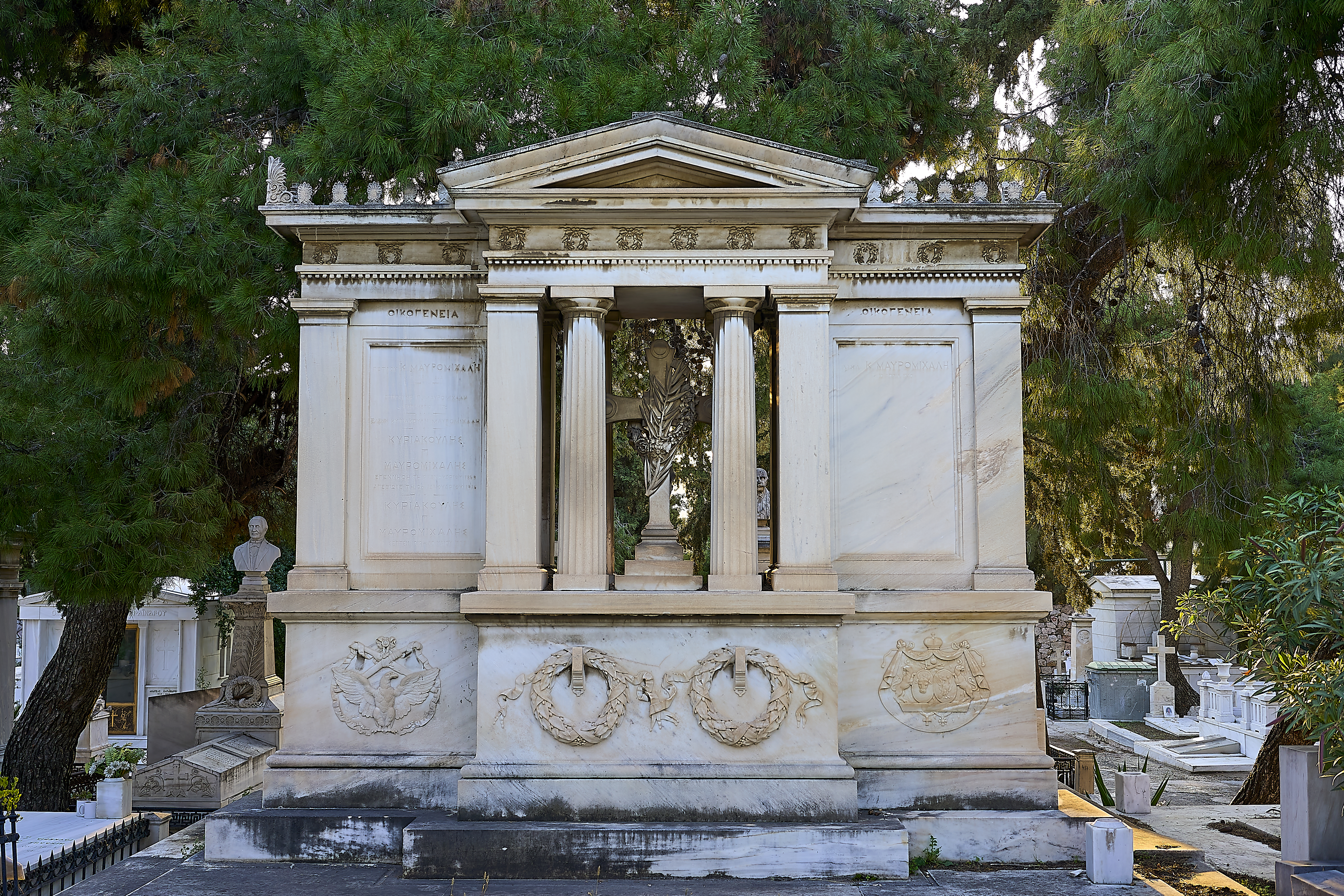
The burial monument of the Mavromichalis family in the First Cemetery of Athens

The Mavromichalis family (Greek: Μαυρομιχάλης, [mav.ro.miˈxa.lis], lit. 'black Michael') is a prominent Greek family from Mani Peninsula, whose members played a major role in modern Greek history.

== Origin ==
According to the Maniot tradition, confirmed by the 31 May 1870 epitaph of Anastasios-Petros Mavromichalis (which may be found in the Metropolis of Athens), the first members of the clan were refugees from the community of Kardias in Eastern Thrace who escaped Turkish attacks in 1452 and resettled in Western Mani.

The name Mavromichalis is said to derive from an orphan named Michalis (Μιχάλης, 'Michael'). Because of the dark clothing worn during times of mourning, orphans were often called mavros (μαύρος, lit. 'black'). From this 'mavros Michalis' future generations bore the name of Mavromichalis which is sometimes translated as "Michael the orphan".

Initially they established in Alika, but due to blood feuds and conflicts they moved to Tsimova in the eastern part of the Messenian Gulf and from there to Tsimova's port village Limeni where they made their stronghold. After fortifying the village they took advantage of the port taxations during the Venetian domination which eventually arranged their land's virtual autocephaly.

== Fame and glory ==
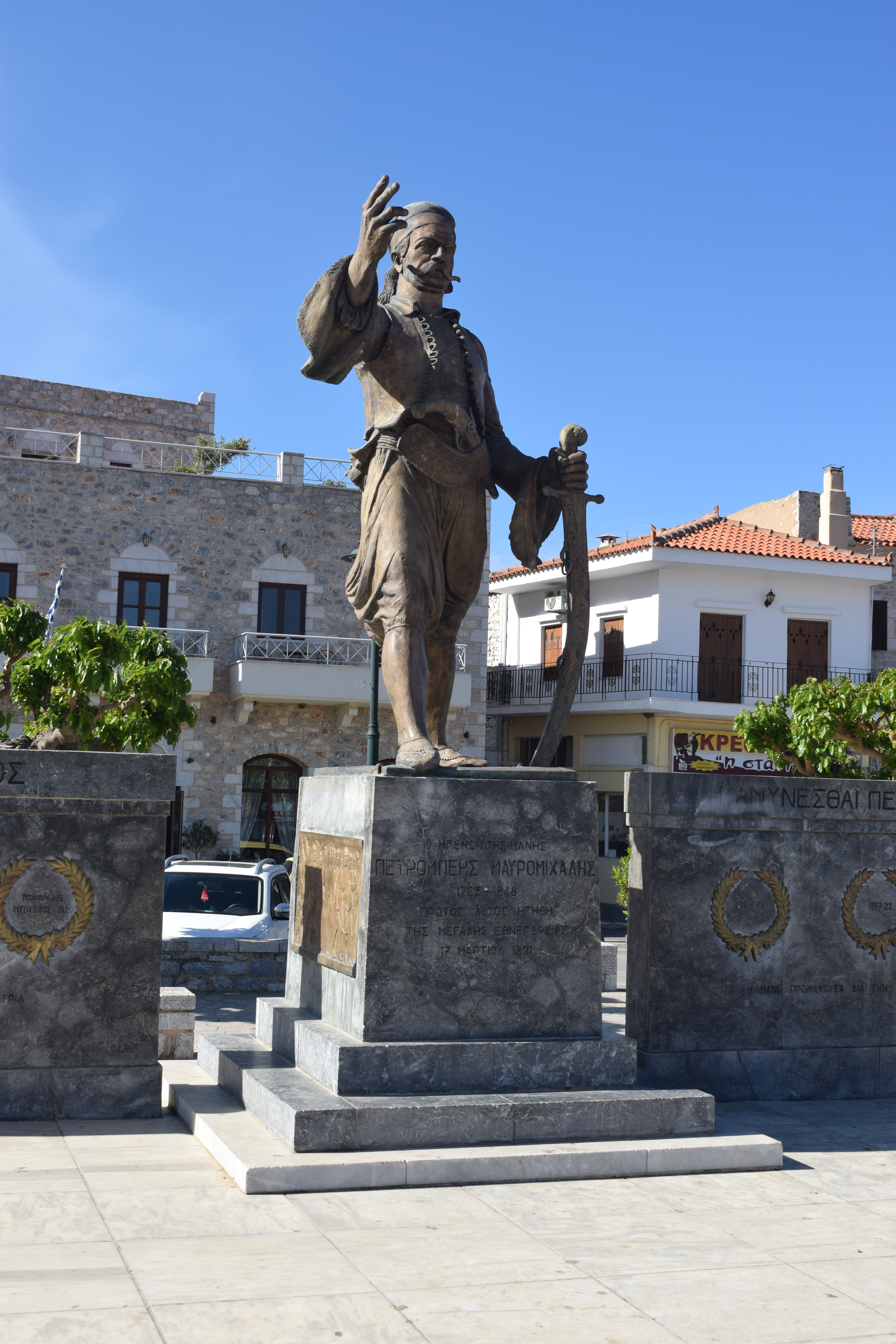
Monument of Petros Mavromichalis in Areopoli

The first renowned Mavromichalis leader is the 18th descendant of the orphan boy, Georgios Mavromichalis, who was the hegemon of a rebellion that took place on the Peloponnese sponsored by Count Orlov during the Russo-Turkish War of 1768–1774. Together with his sons Ilias-Pierros Mavromichalis and Ioannis "Skilogiannis" Mavromichalis, he guided Maniot soldiers to victory over the Turks and their Albanian allies.

Another notable member of the family was a son of Skilogiannis Mavromichalis who is known as Şükür Mehmet Bey. As a child, Bey was captured by Turks during battle, later becoming a Muslim and a renegade, eventually becoming an Ottoman Fleet admiral. Although considered a traitor to his motherland and religion Şükür was vital in lobbying for the appointment of his cousin Petros "Petrobey" Mavromichalis as the head of state of the Beylik of Mani by the Sublime Porte.

Petrobey Mavromichalis, with the support of the leading families of the Peloponnese, strengthened the Maniot state and made the Mavromichalis family in particular powerful enough to control sizable swaths of territory in the region, protecting them from Greek rebels and Albanian raiders at the encouragement of the Sultan.

However Petrobey's ultimate goal was the freedom of Greeks from Ottoman rule, and he used his local power and autonomy to build support for a large scale Greek rebellion. In 1821 this rebellion formally began in what would become the Greek War of Independence. He was known as a dealmaker and voluntarily ceded leadership of the rebellion to Theodoros Kolokotronis when it became politically necessary. He contributed vital contingents of troops to liberate Kalamata and Tripolis and participated in the expedition to help the Souliotes. On this expedition Petrobey's young brother Kyriakoulis Mavromichalis heroically died fighting the Turks. Under the leadership of Petrobey and his brother Konstantinos Mavromichalis, Greek forces successfully defeated renowned Ottoman commander Ibrahim Pasha during the Egyptian Invasion of Mani. This military victory secured Greek control of the strategically important city of Nafplio which, after the revolution, would become the first capital city of the modern Greek state.

After the revolution, Petrobey and his brother Ioannis Mavromichalis were arrested and imprisoned on charges of high treason as a result of stark political disagreements with Greece's first head of state, Ioannis Kapodistrias. In response to their imprisonment, Petrobey's brother Konstantinos and son Georgios Mavromichalis assassinated Ioannis Kapodistrias.

== Aftermath ==
With the advent of the Modern State of Greece, the Mavromichalis family were key members of the "military party" and advocated for the formation of a decentralized state with autonomy for the provinces, particularly their home province of Peloponnisos. This clashed with the principles of a homogeneous, western, united, and centralized state championed by Ioannis Kapodistrias, the first head of state of independent Greece, and culminated in his assassination in Nafplion in 1831.

In modern times, the most prominent member of the Mavromichalis family was Kyriakos-Petros Mavromichalis (grandson of Kyriakoulis the hero of the Independence), who was not a soldier but a lawyer and politician, and later became Prime Minister of Greece.

== See also ==
- Mavromichalis (surname)

== Sources ==
- Κ. Ζησίου, Οι Μαυρομιχάλαι. Συλλογή των περί αυτών γραφέντων, (K. Zisiou, The Mavromichalai. Collection of their own scripts, Athens,1903)
- Ανάργυρου Κουτσιλιέρη, Ιστορία της Μάνης, (Anargiros Koutsilieris, History of Mani, Athens, 1996)
