= Ottoman–Egyptian invasion of Mani =

1826 Greek military campaign during the Greek War of Independence

- Part of the Greek War of Independence
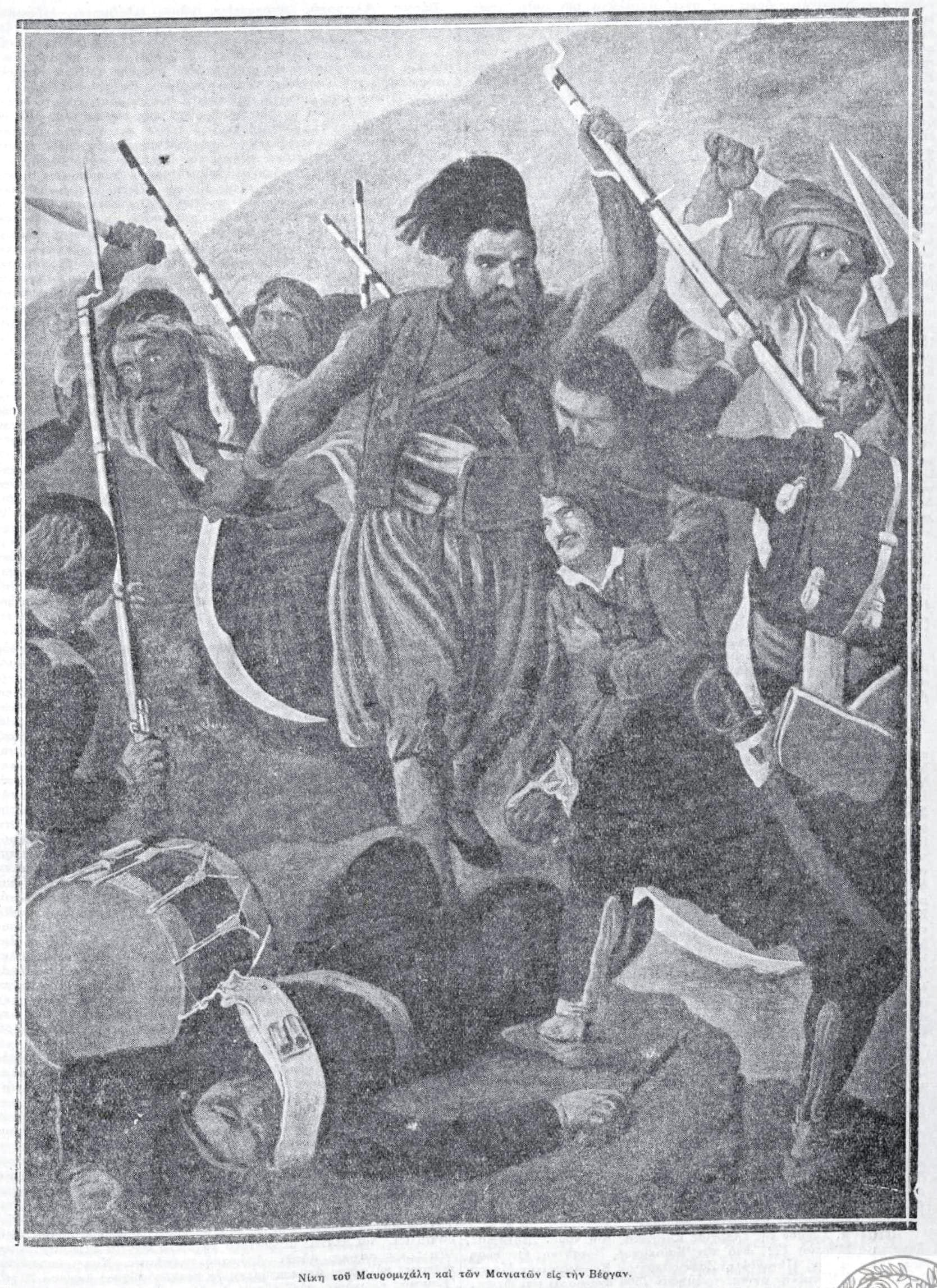
- A depiction of the Battle of Vergas by Peter von Hess
Date	21 June – 28 August 1826 (2 months and 1 week)
Location	Mani, Morea Eyalet, Ottoman Empire (now Laconia, Greece) 36.5590°N 22.4303°E
Result	Greek victory

Belligerents
(Greece) First Hellenic Republic: Maniot Forces; Other Greek forces	Ottoman Empire: Egypt Eyalet

Commanders and leaders
Petrobey Mavromichalis	Ibrahim Pasha of Egypt

Strength
Vergas: 2,500 men + 2,000 reinforcements Diro: 500 men and women Polyaravos: 2,000 men Total: 7,000	Vergas: 7,000; Diro: 1,500; Polyaravos: 4,000 Total: 12,500

Casualties and losses
Vergas: Unknown; Diro: Unknown; Polyaravos: 9	Vergas: 2,500; Diro: 1,000; Polyaravos: 400 Total: 3,900

The Ottoman–Egyptian invasion of Mani was a campaign during the Greek War of Independence that consisted of three battles. The Maniots fought against a combined Egyptian and Ottoman army under the command of Ibrahim Pasha of Egypt.

On March 17, 1821, the Maniots (residents of the central peninsula on the southern part of the Peloponnese) declared war on the Ottoman Empire, preceding the rest of Greece in joining the revolution by about a week. The various Greek forces won a quick string of victories. However, disputes broke out amongst the leaders and anarchy ensued. The Ottomans seized this chance and called for reinforcements from Egypt. The reinforcements came under the command of Ibrahim Pasha, the son of the leader of Egypt, Muhammad Ali. With the Greeks in disarray, Ibrahim ravaged the Peloponnese and after a four months siege he captured the city of Missolonghi in April. He then went back to the Peloponnese and turned his attention in June to Mani.

Ibrahim tried to enter Mani from the north-east near Almiro on June 21, 1826, but he was forced to stop at the fortifications at Vergas. His army of 7,000 men was held off by an army of 2,000 Maniots and 500 refugees from other parts of Greece. Despite Egyptian and Ottoman artillery, the outnumbered Maniots managed to hold off the Ottomans. Ibrahim sent 1,500 men to attempt a landing near Areopoli and go north to threaten the Maniot rear. This force was initially successful; however they were repelled with heavy losses. When the Egyptians at Vergas heard that Theodoros Kolokotronis was advancing on their rear they retreated.

In August, Ibrahim renewed the offensive and he sent a group of regular soldiers down the coast and they reached Kariopoli before they retreated. Ibrahim sent a force of 8,000 men down to Polyaravos and on the way they destroyed a tower that was opposing them. When they reached Polyaravos, they were faced by the Maniots in their forts. The Egyptians and the Ottomans were forced to retreat with significant losses. This was the last time Mani was invaded during the War for Independence, as Greece was liberated in 1828.

== Prelude ==
The Greek War of Independence had started on the March 17, 1821, when the Maniots declared war on the Ottoman Empire at Areopoli. On March 21, the Maniot army of 2,000 men under the command of Petros Mavromichalis which also included Theodoros Kolokotronis, marched from Areopolis and headed for Messenia. The next day, they reached Kalamata, which had an Ottoman garrison and they captured the city on March 23.

The rest of Greece joined the war when Bishop Germanos of Patras declared Greece in rebellion on March 25. At Kalamata, the Greeks established the Messenian Senate which governed affairs in the southern Peloponnese. Kolokotronis wanted to attack Tripoli but Petros Mavromichalis convinced him to attack the smaller towns first. Petrobey also sent letters to the courts of Europe telling them of the Greeks' plan. Petrobey finished off the letters by signing it with Petrobey Mavromichalis, Prince and Commander-in-Chief. On April 28, the Maniot army joined Kolokotronis forces at Karytainia. From there they went to Tripoli and started to besiege the city. The city eventually fell on September 23, 1821 and was sacked by the Greeks.

Due to the unrelenting losses and stories of Greek atrocities in Tripolis, the Sultan became desperate and in 1824 he called on his Viceroy in Egypt, Muhammad Ali, to aid him. Ali promised to aid him in return for cession of the island of Crete, Cyprus, as well as making his son Ibrahim Pasha, Pasha of the Peloponnese. After his offer was accepted, Ali sent his son in command of the expedition. Meanwhile, the Greeks were in disarray because of political rivalries which had caused a civil war. Kolokotronis was arrested, his son Panos was killed, and his nephew Nikitaras forced to flee.

Ibrahim used the confusion to land at Methoni in the Peloponnese. From Methoni, Ibrahim started pillaging the Peloponnese and taking many people as slaves. Ibrahim captured Tripolis but was stopped from capturing Nauplion by Kostantinos Mavromichalis and Dimitrios Ypsilantis. In retaliation, Ibrahim burnt down Argos before returning to Tripoli. Ibrahim decided to go with his army and join Reshid Pasha at Missolonghi in Central Greece. The Egyptians reached the city on December 12, 1825 and helped the Ottomans with the siege.

On April 10, 1826, the city fell to the invaders and the city was sacked.

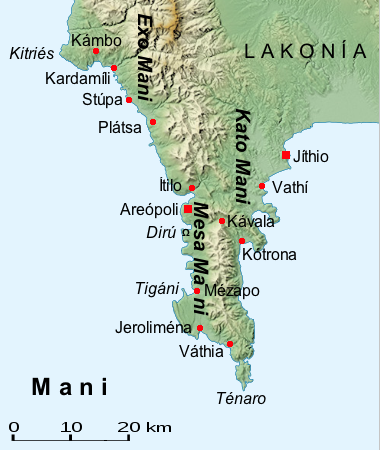
A map of the Mani peninsula.

== Battle of Vergas ==
Ibrahim sent an envoy to Mani demanding its surrender or else he would pillage it. He received the Maniotic reply of:

From the few Greeks of Mani and the rest of Greeks who live there to Ibrahim Pasha. We received your letter in which you try to frighten us saying that if we don't surrender, you'll kill the Maniots and plunder Mani. That's why we are waiting for you and your army. We, the inhabitants of Mani, sign and wait for you.

Ibrahim, furious with the response, ordered an attack on northwestern Mani from Kalamata on June 23, 1826. Under his command was a force of 7,000 men, a mixture of infantry and cavalry. The invaders were forced to stop at the fortifications of the Maniots at Vergas near Almiro. Defending the walls were 2,000 Maniot soldiers and 500 Greek refugees.

The flag of Mani. Nίκη ή Θάνατος (Victory or Death); Tαν ή επι τας (With the shield or on the shield).

The Egyptian artillery failed to breach the walls, so Ibrahim decided to launch two ships with cannons and have them bombard the Maniot defences from the sea. He also combined this attack with infantry assaults, however these failed as the invaders were driven back from the walls eight times. The attacks lasted for a few more days before the Egyptians and Ottomans were forced to retreat when news arrived that Kolokotronis was approaching their rear with 2,000 men. The Maniots chased the Egyptians up to Kalamata before withdrawing. Ibrahim lost 2,500 men at Vergas and the Greek losses are unknown.

== Battle of Diro ==
During the Battle of Vergas, Ibrahim decided to attack the Maniots from the rear. His plan was to send a small fleet with a few soldiers to land at the Bay of Diros, 2 kilometers south of Areopolis. The aim of this was to capture the unguarded Areopoli, which cut the communication lines of the defenders at Vergas and demoralize them as well. He would then be able to attack the Maniots from the rear and control the mountain passes to eastern Mani and Gytheio. Authors Peter Greenhalgh and Edward Eliopoulos describe this plan as excellent.

On June 23, he sent a small fleet carrying 1,500 to land at the Bay of Diros and to capture Areopolis. Aid came from other villages. On June 26, the surviving Egyptians were rescued by Ibrahim's fleet from the beach and those who were not rescued had to swim to the ships or be killed by the Maniots. This battle cost Ibrahim 1,000 men and he was forced to retreat from Mani after being defeated at Vergas.

== Battle of Polyaravos ==
After his retreat from Mani due to the defeats at Vergas and Diros Pasha renewed his offensive in August. Ibrahim's army was led by a Laconian from Bardounia named Bosinas who had assistance from the Egyptian fleet. On August 27, he reached Kariopoli in an attempt to take a safe path through the mountains. Before he reached the town of Polyaravos, his army of 8,000 Egyptians was delayed by Theodoros Stathakos and his family of thirteen men who refused to let the invaders past their tower. Bosinas tried to negotiate with Stathakos. Stathakos, feigning surrender, told Bosinas to come and take his family's guns. As Bosinas came to retrieve the guns, the Stathakos family killed him. In retaliation, the Egyptians used their two cannons and blew up the tower.

The Egyptians then proceeded towards the town of Polyaravos and reached it on August 28. Awaiting them there were 2,000 Maniots behind their fortifications. The Maniots had chosen Polyaravos as their position of defence as it was on high ground and was surrounded by rocky slopes. This would have meant that the Egyptians could have been stopped before they arrived at the town. As part of their defence plan the villages sent all the women and children to the mountains before improving the fortifications. As the Egyptians arrived at the walls, the Maniots sallied out and caught the Egyptians by surprise. The Egyptians, suffering losses, withdrew from Mani and back into the Laconian plain. The Egyptians had lost 400 men during the battle and the Maniots only lost 9. This was the last invasion launched against Mani.

== Aftermath ==
Even though this campaign is overshadowed by other battles of the revolution, it was one of the most important. The Maniates stopped the Egyptians and Ibrahim Pasha who had not been defeated this decisively before. The women who defeated the Egyptians at Diros have been given the name of 'The Amazons of Diros'. This was the last invasion of Mani as Ibrahim abandoned any ideas of conquering it. On the 26 April 1827 the Turkish navy bombarded Oitylo with over 1,700 cannonballs hitting the town.

In 1827, the combined fleets of France, England and Russia defeated the combined Ottoman–Egyptian fleet in the Battle of Navarino. In 1828, under the terms of the London Protocol, Greece became an independent state which was recognized by the Ottomans in 1829. When Ioannis Capodistrias was made president of Greece, he had Petrobey Mavromichalis imprisoned. The Mavromichalis' reacted by assassinating Capodistrias in Nauplion as he went to church. The Maniots continued causing trouble and defeated two Bavarian armies King Otto sent against them before they were subdued only after some of the leaders were bribed. This ended the Maniots' independence and they were forced to pay taxes.

== Notes ==
Fortifications of Vergas: The fortifications at Vergas were one of four built by the Maniots. The fortifications started at the sea near Almiros and ran uphill for another 550 metres. The fortifications were built at a strategic position that controlled the passes into northwestern Mani. They were also hard to capture because at its highest point it was 50 meters above sea level. The wall ran along a dry riverbed which also made it hard for invaders. The wall had many loop holes and larger openings used for cannons.

== Sources ==
- Bob Barrow, (1998). The Mani. Stoupa: Thomeas Travel Services.
- Patrick Leigh Fermor, (1984). Mani: Travels in the Southern Peloponnese. London: Penguin. ISBN 0-14-011511-0
- Peter Greenhalgh and Edward Eliopoulos. Deep into Mani: Journey to the southern tip of Greece. London: Trinity Press. ISBN 0-571-13524-2
- Kyriakos Kassis, (1979). Mani's History. Athens: Presoft.
- Peter Harold, Paroulakis, (1984). The Greeks: Their Struggle for Independence. Darwin: Hellenic International Press. ISBN 0-9590894-0-3
- Yiannis Saĭtas, translated by Philip Ramp, (1990). Greek Traditional Architecture: Mani. Athens: Melissa Publishing House.
