= Konstantinos Mavromichalis =

Greek politician and military commander during the Greek War of Independence

Konstantinos Mavromichalis Κωνσταντίνος Μαυρομιχάλης
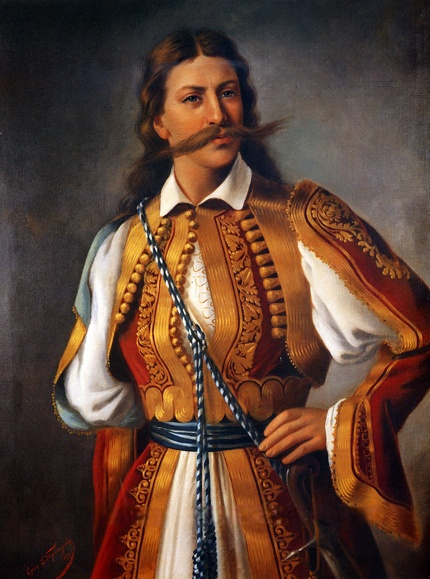

Member of the Executive of 1824
- In office 9 November 1824 – 17 April 1826
- Preceded by: Asimakis Fotilas

Personal details
- Born: 1797 Limeni, Morea Eyalet, Ottoman Empire (now Greece)
- Died: 10 October 1831 (aged 33–34) Nafplion, First Hellenic Republic
- Parents: Pierros Mavromichalis (father); Katerina Koutsogrigorakos (mother)
- Relatives: Petros Mavromichalis (brother); Kyriakoulis Mavromichalis (brother); Ioannis Mavromichalis (brother); Antonios Mavromichalis (brother); Georgios Mavromichalis (nephew); Demetrios Mavromichalis (nephew); Periklis Pierrakos-Mavromichalis (nephew); Kyriakoulis Mavromichalis (great-nephew)
- Known for: Assassinating Ioannis Kapodistrias

Military service
- Allegiance: (Greece) First Hellenic Republic
- Branch/service: Hellenic Army
- Battles/wars: Greek War of Independence; Battle of Valtetsi; Battle of the Lerna Mills; Ottoman–Egyptian Invasion of Mani; Battle of Vergas; Battle of Diro; Battle of Polyaravos

Konstantinos Mavromichalis (Greek: Κωνσταντίνος Μαυρομιχάλης; Mani, 1797–Nafplio, 1831), brother of the Bey of Mani, Petros Mavromichalis, was a Greek military commander of Maniot forces during the Greek War of Independence, and the assassin of the first head of state of Greece, Ioannis Kapodistrias.

Along with Demetrios Ypsilantis, he commanded the forces that saved Nafplio from Ibrahim Pasha of Egypt, during the Ottoman–Egyptian invasion of Mani. He participated and excelled in the battles of Valtetsi, Lerna Mills, Vergas, Diro, Polyaravos, and others. He served as a member of the Executive of 1824 in the First Hellenic Republic, from 9 November 1824 until 17 April 1826.

When two of his brothers, Ioannis and Petros, were captured by government forces under Kapodistrias, Konstantinos and Georgios Mavromichalis, Petros' son, decided to take revenge. On 27 September 1831, the two Maniots were waiting by the doors of the church of Saint Spyridon in Nafplio. Konstantinos shot Kapodistrias through the head and Georgios stabbed him through the heart. However, Konstantinos was shot and wounded by Georgios Kozonis, the one-eyed and one-handed Cretan bodyguard of Kapodistrias, while at the same time the enraged crowd rushed against him. He received the final shot from general Fotomaras, who shot him from a nearby house, causing him to fall down from his wounds. The angry mob gathered around him and began hitting him all over his body. A few minutes later he took his last breath, and people dragged his body to Platanos Square (now Syntagma Square) and threw him from the high walls of the fortress into the sea. Georgios took refuge in the French embassy, which protected him from the people who persecuted him, but was eventually forced to hand him over to the authorities for trial. Georgios was convicted of the crime and executed on 10 October.
