= Georgios Mavromichalis =

Greek assassin

- Γεώργιος Μαυρομιχάλης
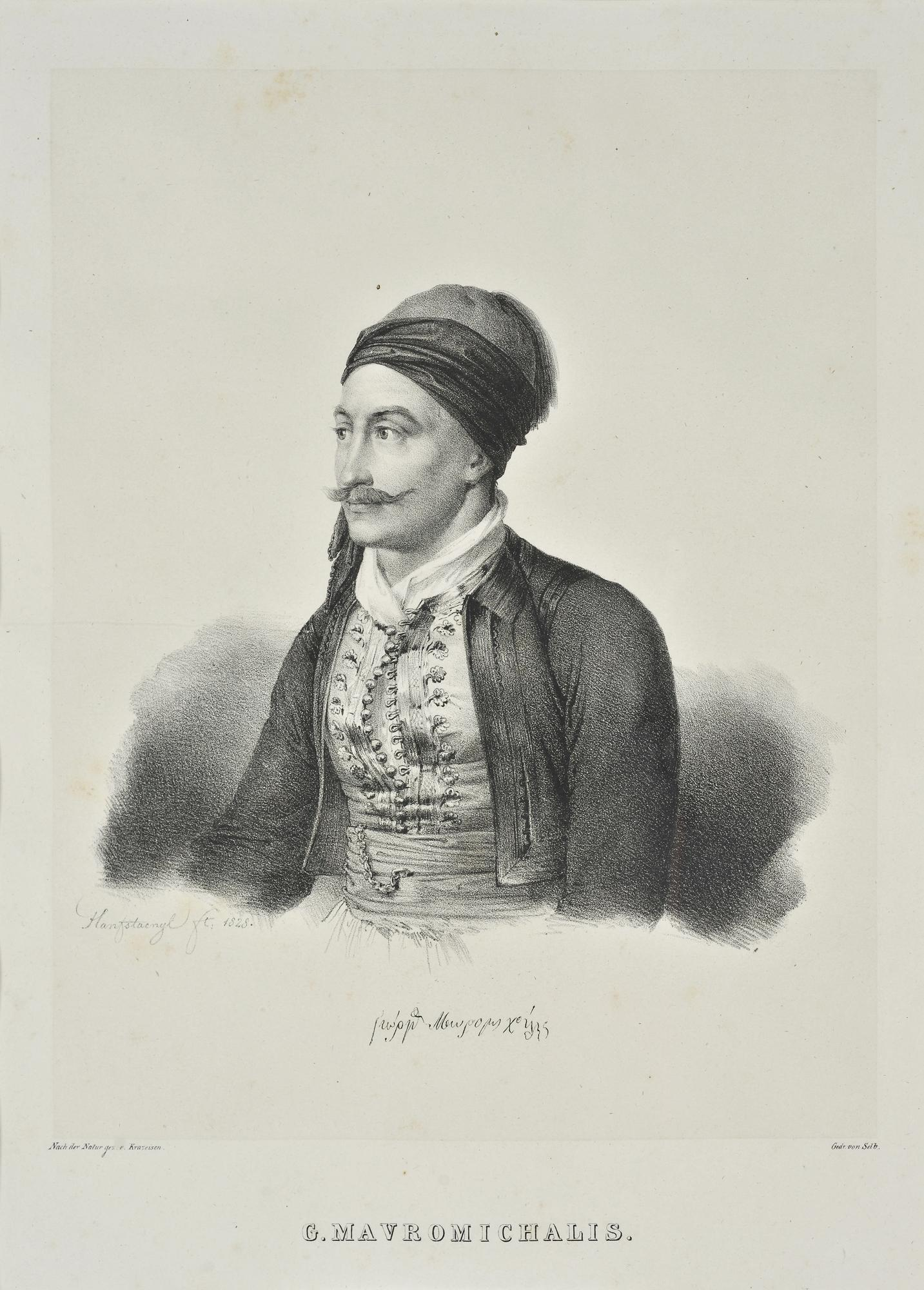
- A lithography of Georgios Mavromichalis by Karl Krazeisen in 1829
- Born: c. 1800; Mani Peninsula, Morea Eyalet, Ottoman Empire (now Greece)
- Died: October 1831; Nafplion, First Hellenic Republic
- Relatives: Petrobey Mavromichalis (father); Demetrios Mavromichalis (brother); Konstantinos Mavromichalis (uncle); Kyriakoulis Mavromichalis (uncle); Antonios Mavromichalis; Periklis Pierrakos-Mavromichalis (cousin); Kyriakoulis Mavromichalis (nephew)
- Military career
- Allegiance: (Greece) First Hellenic Republic
- Branch: Hellenic Army
- Known for: Assassinating Ioannis Kapodistrias
- Conflicts: Greek War of Independence; Battle of Dervenakia
- Other work: Member of the Filiki Etaireia

Georgios Mavromichalis (Greek: Γεώργιος Μαυρομιχάλης; c. 1800–1831) was a Greek who, along with his uncle Konstantinos Mavromichalis, assassinated the governor of the First Hellenic Republic, Ioannis Kapodistrias, on 9 October 1831 outside of the Church of Saint Spyridion in Nafplio. He was the son of the Maniot rebel Petrobey Mavromichalis, who had played a vital role in the Greek War of Independence against the Ottoman Empire.

== Role in the assassination of Kapodistrias ==
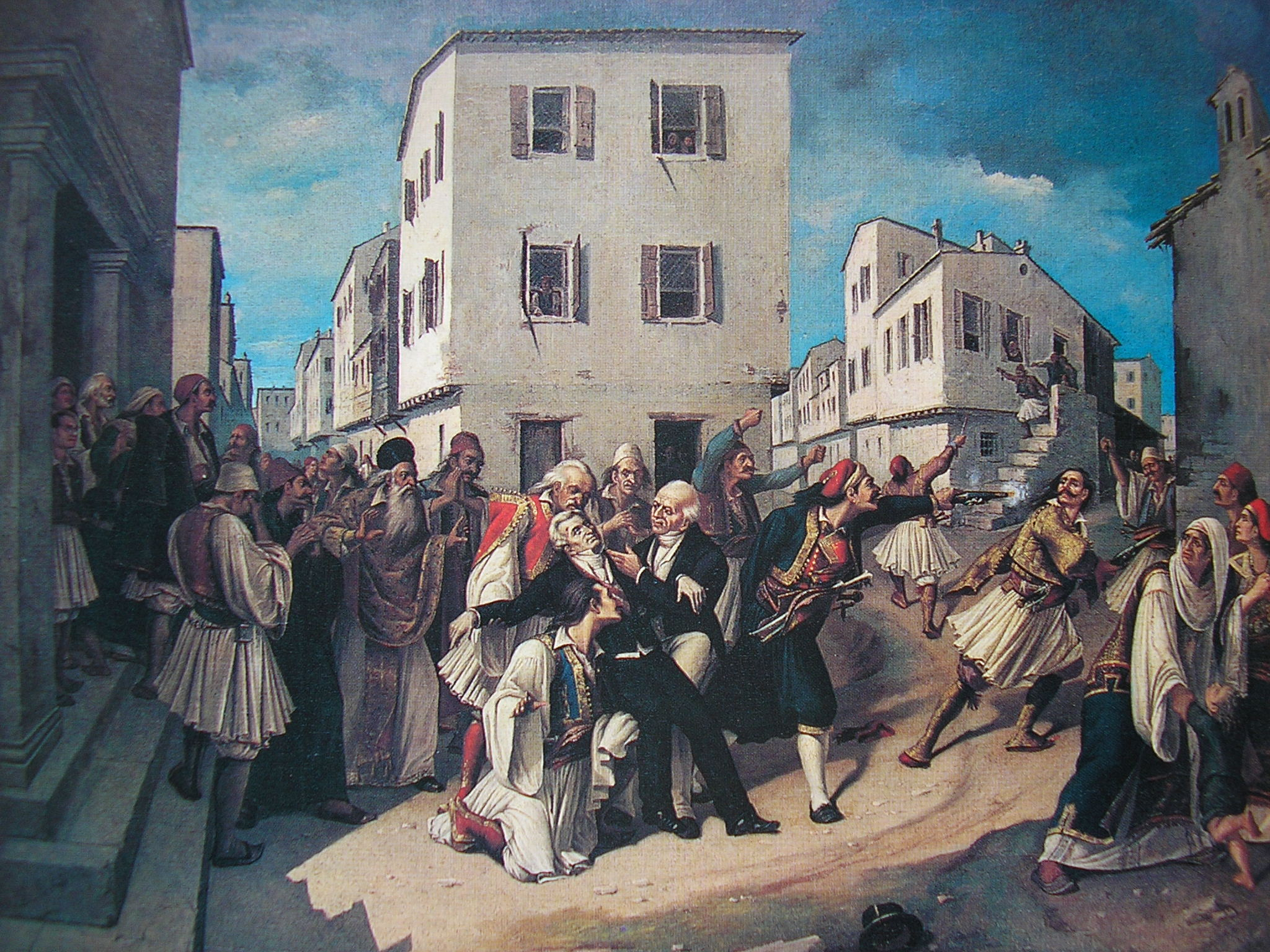
"The murder of Kapodistrias" by Charalambos Pachis.

When his father was captured, placed in prison and charged with high treason on the order of Ioannis Kapodistrias, Georgios and his uncle Konstantinos decided to exact revenge for the apprehension of their family's patriarch. On 9 October [O.S. 27 September] 1831, the duo decided to assassinate the governor as he entered the Church of Saint Spyridion in Nafplio. Konstantinos attempted to shoot Kapodistrias as he climbed the steps outside of the building, but the bullet missed and lodged in the church's wall, where it remains visible to this day. After his bullet missed, he resorted to stabbing the governor in the stomach whilst Georgios impaled him through the heart, fatally wounding him. As the pair were escaping, the Greek army officer Christos Fotomaras (who had witnessed the assassination from his own window across from the church before coming down to tend to the governor) shot Konstantinos in the temple, killing him instantly and simultaneously bursting his skull.

Georgios managed to escape and hide inside the French embassy, but was forced to surrendered to the Greek authorities after a few days. He was sentenced to death by a court-martial and was executed by firing squad. His final request that the executioners not shoot him in the head so as to not mirror the brutality of his uncle's death, which had so shocked and traumatized him. His last words were, "peace brothers!".

== Sources ==
- Brewer, David (2011). The Greek War of Independence : the struggle for freedom from Ottoman oppression. New York: Overlook. ISBN 978-1-59020-691-1. OCLC 706018492.
- Paroulakis, Peter H. (1984). The Greeks: Their Struggle For Independence. Hellenic International Press. ISBN 0-9590894-1-1.
- Vournas, Tasos (1998). Historia tes synchrones Helladas (in Greek). Ekdoseis Patake. ISBN 978-960-600-524-4.
