= Kyriakoulis Mavromichalis (military commander) =

Greek revolutionary

- Κυριακούλης Μαυρομιχάλης
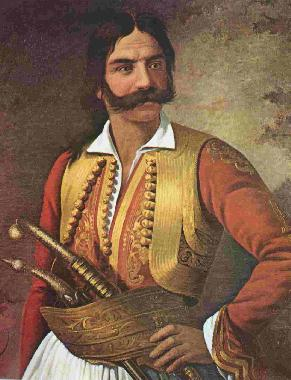
- Kyriakoulis Mavromichalis c. 1822
- Born: 6 August 1765; Limeni, Morea Eyalet, Ottoman Empire (now Greece)
- Died: 4 July 1822 (aged 56); Splantza, Ioannina Eyalet, Ottoman Empire, (now Greece)
- Burial place: Missolonghi
- Relatives: Petrobey Mavromichalis (brother); Antonios Mavromichalis (brother); Konstantinos Mavromichalis (brother); Georgios Mavromichalis (nephew); Demetrios Mavromichalis (nephew); Periklis Pierrakos-Mavromichalis (nephew); Kyriakoulis Mavromichalis (grandson)
- Military career
- Allegiance: (Greece) First Hellenic Republic
- Branch: Hellenic Army
- Conflicts: Greek War of Independence; Liberation of Kalamata; Siege of Tripolitsa; Battle of Valtetsi

Kyriakoulis Mavromichalis (Greek: Κυριακούλης Μαυρομιχάλης; 1765–1822) was a Greek revolutionary who fought in the Greek War of Independence.

He was born in Limeni in the Mani Peninsula, the son of Pierros Pierrakos and Katerina Koutsogrigorakos. He was the younger brother of Petrobey Mavromichalis.

When the Greek War of Independence broke out, he organized a band of young Maniots into a fighting force. Kyriakoulis fought at Kalamata, Methoni, Koroni and was present at the Siege of Tripolitsa operation as commander-in-charge of the Valtetsi headquarters in the nascent revolutionary army.

He successfully defended the camp, twice, in the Battle of Valtetsi, leading a vastly outnumbered force to strengthen their positions, allowing new reinforcements to succeed in repelling the Turkish attack.

With the war against Ali Pasha over, the Souliotes – who had sided with the Albanians against the Ottomans – were in mortal danger due to Hursid Pasha's constant attacks and siege. To deal with this, an inexpert commander Alexandros Mavrokordatos, who was not a soldier but a politician and future statesman, chose Kyriakoulis to command an expedition to bring relief and reinforcements.

On his way to Kiafa, his expeditionary force met action with a Turkish vanguard near the seaside village Mourtos, completely defeating their foes and taking a large number of prisoners. His decision to take his captives to imprisonment in the Peloponnesus rather than to massacre them, as was then common, showed his military ethics, but at the same time weakened his already small regiment composed by 500 Maniots plus some Philhellenes, mostly former Bonapartist French soldiers and young romantic Italian revolutionaries.

In his effort against a stronger and much more compact force under Omer Vryonis, but with the overall leadership of the highly skilled Hursid Pasha (an expert in countering guerrilla warfare), his band was at last defeated at an engagement in Splantza. The Maniots showed the same Thermopylae spirit as their Spartan ancestors fighting up to the last man. Kyriakoulis was killed on 4 July 1822 in Splantza and was buried with honours in Missolonghi.

Maniot tradition and folk songs, show how his younger brother's death strongly hurt the brave Petrobey's soul:

"Πετρόμπεης καθότανε ψηλά στο Πετροβούνι κι εσφούγγιζε τα μάτια του μ΄ ένα χρυσό μαντήλι. Τι έχεις Μπέη και χλίβεσαι και χύνεις μαύρα δάκρυα; Σα με ρωτάς Κυριάκαινα και θέλεις για να μάθης; Aπόψε μου ΄ρθαν γράμματα από το Μεσολόγγι ...τον Κυριακούλην σκότωσαν, τον πρώτο καπετάνιο και στάζουνε τα μάτια μου και τρέχουν μαύρα δάκρυα."

"Petrobey was lying in the highlands of Petrovouni (Stone Mountain) wiping his eyes with a golden kerchief. What's happening to you Bey, that you're so sad and black tears fall from your eyes? Since you're asking Kyriakaina (Kyriakoulis' wife) and you want to know... Tonight I got news from Missolonghi ... Kyriakoulis was killed, the main captain. This is why my eyes are full with black tears."

He was the grandfather of Kyriakoulis Petrou Mavromichalis, the politician and later Prime Minister but above all, for the Peloponnesians in general and for the Maniots in particular he became the icon of the sacrifice made in behalf of the freedom of Greece.
