= Demetrios Mavromichalis =

Greek politician and military personnel (1809–1882)

- Δημήτριος Μαυρομιχάλης
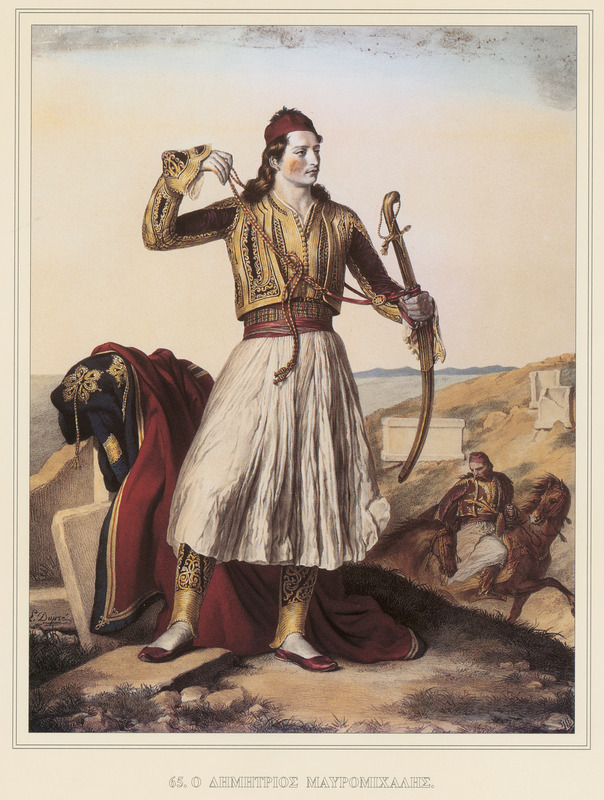
- Lithograph depicting Demetrios Mavromichalis c. 1827 by Louis Dupré

Minister of Military Affairs
- In office 11 October 1862 – 8 February 1863
- Monarch: Otto
- Prime Minister: Dimitrios Voulgaris
- Preceded by: Spyridon Milios
- Succeeded by: Leonidas Smolents

Personal details
- Born: 1809 Limeni, Morea Eyalet, Ottoman Empire (now Greece)
- Died: 1882 (aged 72–73) Athens, Kingdom of Greece
- Parents: Petrobey Mavromichalis (father); Anna Benakis (mother)
- Relatives: Pierros Mavromichalis (grandfather); Katerina Koutsogrigorakos (grandmother); Ilias Mavromichalis (brother); Panagiotitsa Mavromichalis (sister); Georgios Mavromichalis (brother); Anastasios Mavromichalis (brother); Ioannis P. Mavromichalis (brother); Kyriakoulis Mavromichalis (uncle); Antonios Mavromichalis (uncle); Konstantinos Mavromichalis (uncle); Ioannis Mavromichalis (uncle); Periklis Pierrakos-Mavromichalis (cousin); Kyriakoulis Mavromichalis (nephew)
- Occupation: politician and military personnel
- Known for: Aide-de-camp to King Otto23 October 1862 Revolution

Military service
- Allegiance: First Hellenic Republic; Kingdom of Greece
- Branch/service: Hellenic Army
- Battles/wars: Greek War of Independence; 23 October 1862 Revolution

Demetrios Mavromichalis (Greek: Δημήτριος Μαυρομιχάλης; 1809–1882) was a Greek politician and military personnel.

He was born in Mani and was the fifth and last son of Petrobey Mavromichalis. He lived for many years in Paris and pursued a military career. He reached the rank of major general and was an aide to King Otto of Greece. He actively participated in the 23 October 1862 Revolution, and in the provisional government that followed, Demetrios served as Minister of Military Affairs of Greece from 11 October 1862 until 8 February 1863.

He died in Athens, in 1882.
