= Petrobey Mavromichalis =

Greek general and politician (1765–1848)

- Πετρόμπεης Μαυρομιχάλης
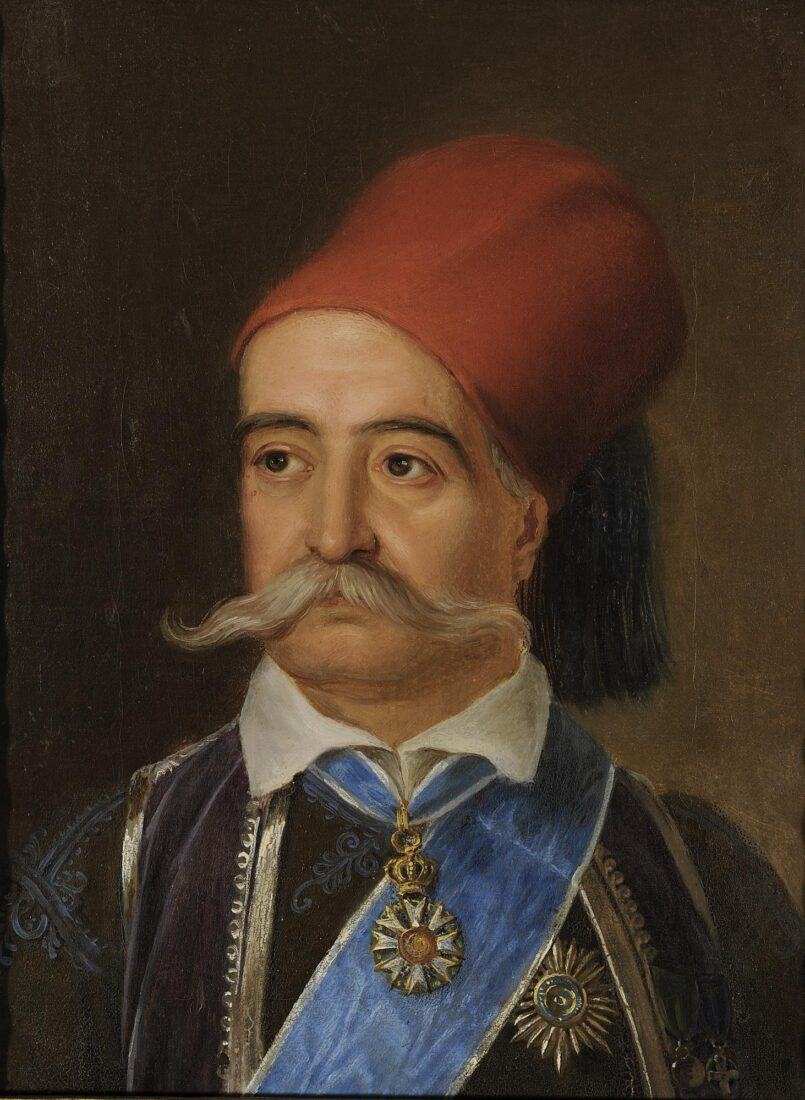
- Portrait by Theodoros Vryzakis

President of the Executive Provisional Administration of Greece
- In office 26 April 1823 – 5 January 1824
- Preceded by: Alexandros Mavrokordatos
- Succeeded by: Georgios Kountouriotis

Senator
- In office 18 March 1844 – 17 January 1848
- Monarch: Otto
- Prime Minister: Konstantinos Kanaris; Alexandros Mavrokordatos; Ioannis Kolettis; Kitsos Tzavellas

Personal details
- Born: 6 August 1765 Limeni, Morea Eyalet, Ottoman Empire (now Greece)
- Died: 17 January 1848 (aged 82) Athens, Kingdom of Greece
- Resting place: Limeni, Mani
- Spouse: Anna Benaki
- Relations: Kyriakoulis Mavromichalis (brother); Ioannis Mavromichalis (brother); Antonios Mavromichalis (brother); Konstantinos Mavromichalis (brother); Periklis Pierrakos-Mavromichalis (nephew); Kyriakoulis Mavromichalis (great-nephew)
- Children: Ilias Mavromichalis; Panagiotitsa Mavromichalis; Georgios Mavromichalis; Anastasios Mavromichalis; Ioannis P. Mavromichalis; Demetrios Mavromichalis
- Parent(s): Pierros Mavromichalis; Katerina Koutsogrigorakos
- Occupation: Bey of Mani; revolutionary; soldier
- Awards: Grand Cross of the Order of the Redeemer

Military service
- Allegiance: First Hellenic Republic
- Branch/service: Hellenic Army
- Commands: Commander in Chief of Maniot forces
- Battles/wars: Greek War of Independence; Liberation of Kalamata; Siege of Tripolitsa; Ottoman-Egyptian invasion of Mani

Petros Mavromichalis (Greek: Πέτρος Μαυρομιχάλης; 1765–1848), also known as Petrobey (Greek: Πετρόμπεης [peˈtrobe.is]), was a Greek general and politician who played a major role in the lead-up and during the Greek War of Independence. Before the war, he served as the Bey of Mani. His family had a long history of revolts against the Ottoman Empire, which ruled most of what is now Greece. His grandfather Georgios and his father Pierros were among the leaders of the Orlov Revolt.

== Life ==
Petros was born on 6 August 1765, the son of leader Pierros "Mavromichalis" Pierrakos and Katerina Koutsogrigorakos, a doctor's daughter.

Mavromichalis' family had a long history of uprising against the Ottoman Empire, which ruled most of what is now Greece. His grandfather Georgakis Mavromichalis and his father Pierros "Mavromichalis" Pierrakos were among the leaders of the Orlov Revolt. The revolt was followed by a period of infighting between the leaders of Mani; soon, young Petros gained a strong reputation for mediating the disputes and reuniting the warring families. Due to the failure of several uprisings against the Turks, he was successful in helping many klephts and other rebels to escape to the French-controlled Heptanese, which gave him a useful contact with a potential ally. During that period he possibly made an alliance with Napoleon Bonaparte, who was fighting in Egypt; Napoleon was to strike the Ottoman Empire in coordination with a Greek revolt. Napoleon's failure in Egypt doomed that plan.

By 1814, the reorganized Maniots again became a threat to the Ottomans, and the Sultan offered a number of concessions to Pierrakos, including his being named Bey, or Chieftain, of Mani - in effect formalizing the de facto status of autonomy the region had maintained for years. Under the leadership of Petrobey, as he was now called, the Maniot state and the Pierrakos family in particular were powerful enough to control the areas of the southern Peloponnese against Albanian raiders on behalf of the Sultan. Still, Petrobey was an active participant in the various designs of the Moreot kapetanei (καπεταναίοι, 'captains, commanders of warbands') for an uprising. In 1818, he became a member of the Filiki Eteria, and in 1819 he brokered a formal pact among the major kapetanei families. On 17 March 1821 Petrobey raised his war flag in Areopolis, effectively signaling the start of the Greek War of Independence. His troops marched into Kalamata and took the city on 23 March. After the arrival of Ypsilantis's emissaries in Mani, local people rose under the leadership of Mavromichalis. Greek insurgents organised in units of armed civilians took control of most of the fortresses.

After the summer of 1822, Petrobey retired from battle, leaving the leadership of his troops to his sons (two of whom were killed fighting). He continued to act as a mediator whenever disputes arose among the kapetanaioi, and acted as the leader of the Messenian Senate, a council of prominent revolutionary leaders. He also tried to seek support from the West by sending a number of letters to leaders and philhellenes in Europe and the United States.

After the revolution, Petrobey became a member of the first Greek Senate, under the leadership of Ioannis Kapodistrias. The two men soon clashed as a result of Kapodistrias' insistence on establishing a centralized regional administration based on political appointees, replacing the traditional system of family loyalties. Petros' brother Ioannis led a revolt against the appointed governor of Lakonia; the two brothers were invited to meet Kapodistrias and negotiate a solution but when they showed up, they were arrested. From his prison cell, Petros tried to negotiate a settlement with Kapodistrias; the latter refused. The crisis was then settled by more traditional means: Petros' brother Konstantinos and his son Georgios assassinated Kapodistrias on 9 October 1831. Petros publicly disapproved of the murder. Kapodistrias was succeeded by King Otto, whose attitude towards the kapetanaioi was much friendlier. Petros became vice-president of the Council of State, and later a senator. He was also one of the few Greeks to be awarded the Grand Cross of the Order of the Redeemer.

He died in Athens on 17 January 1848 and was buried with the highest honors.

== Gallery ==
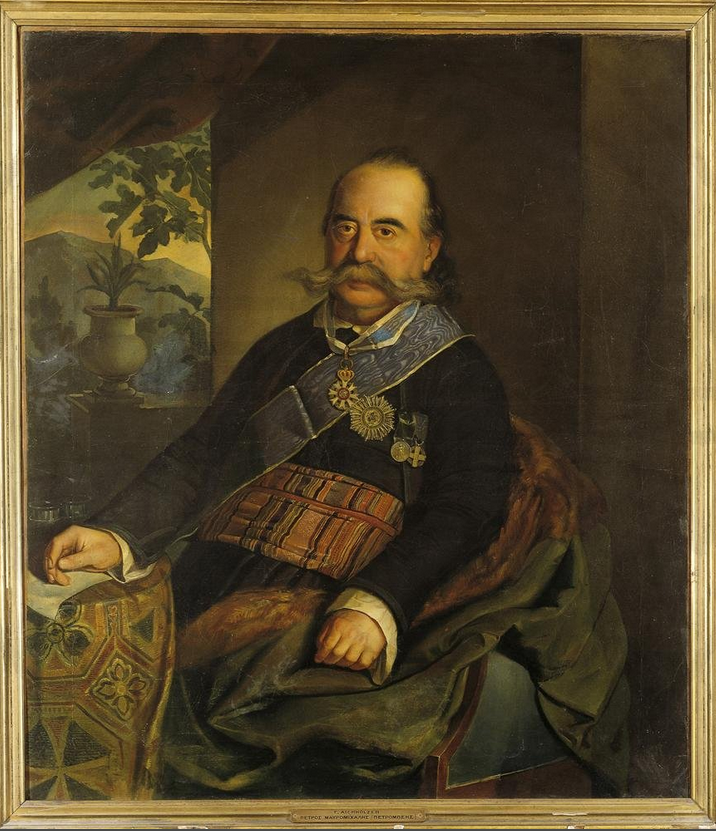
Portrait of Mavromichalis (1837), Benaki Museum

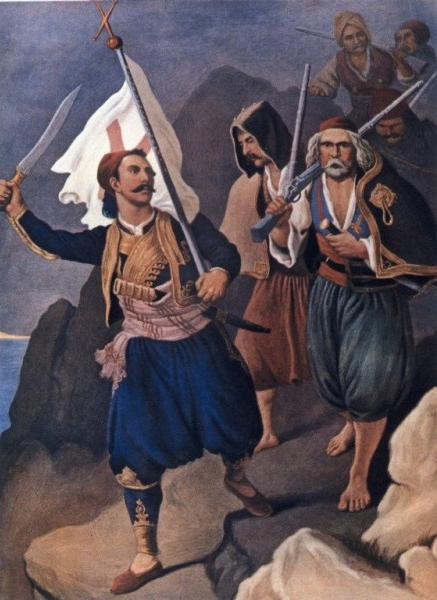
Petros Mavromichalis by Peter von Hess

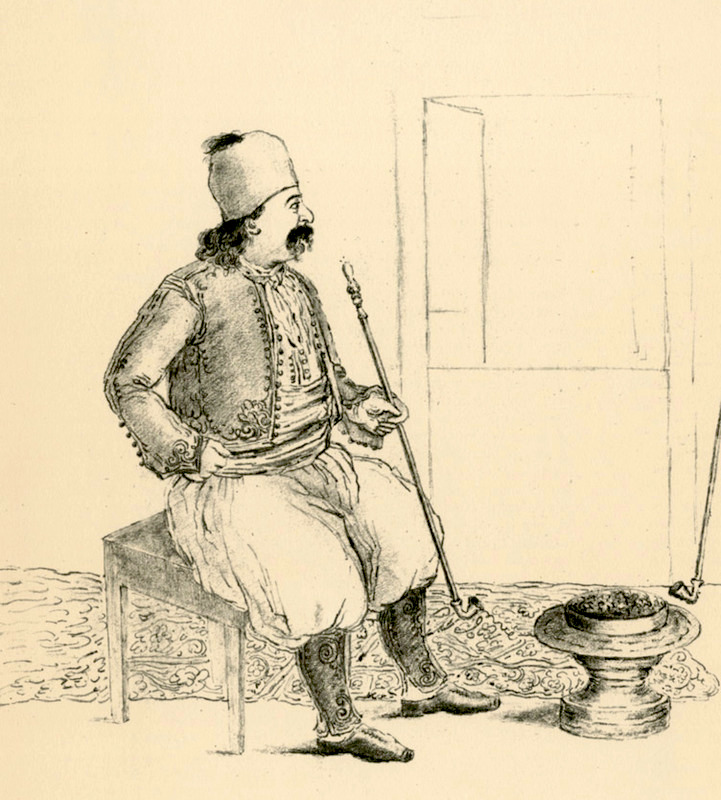
Sketch of Mavromichalis (1828) by Pierre Peytier

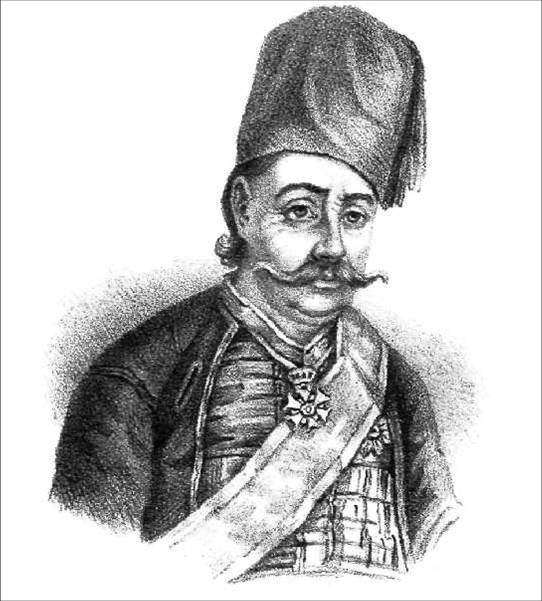
Sketch of Mavromichalis (1864), National Diary by Vrettos

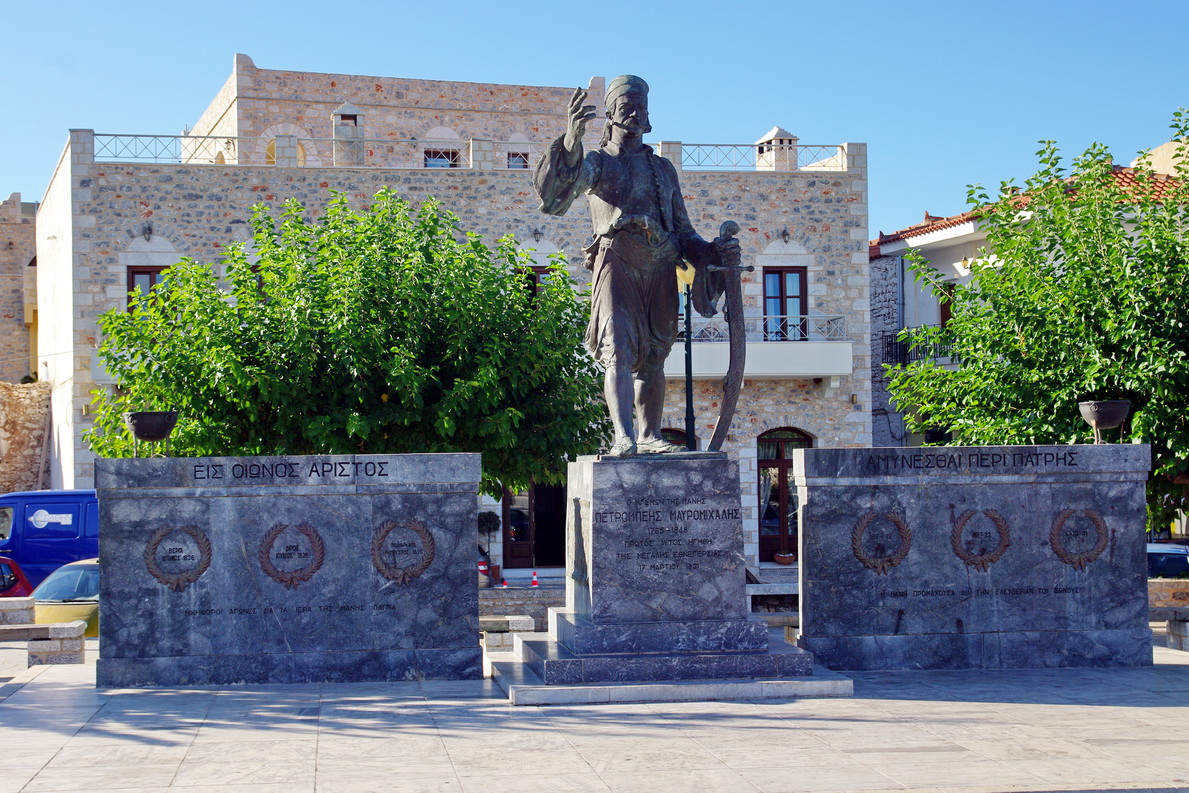
A monument of Mavromichalis in Areopoli

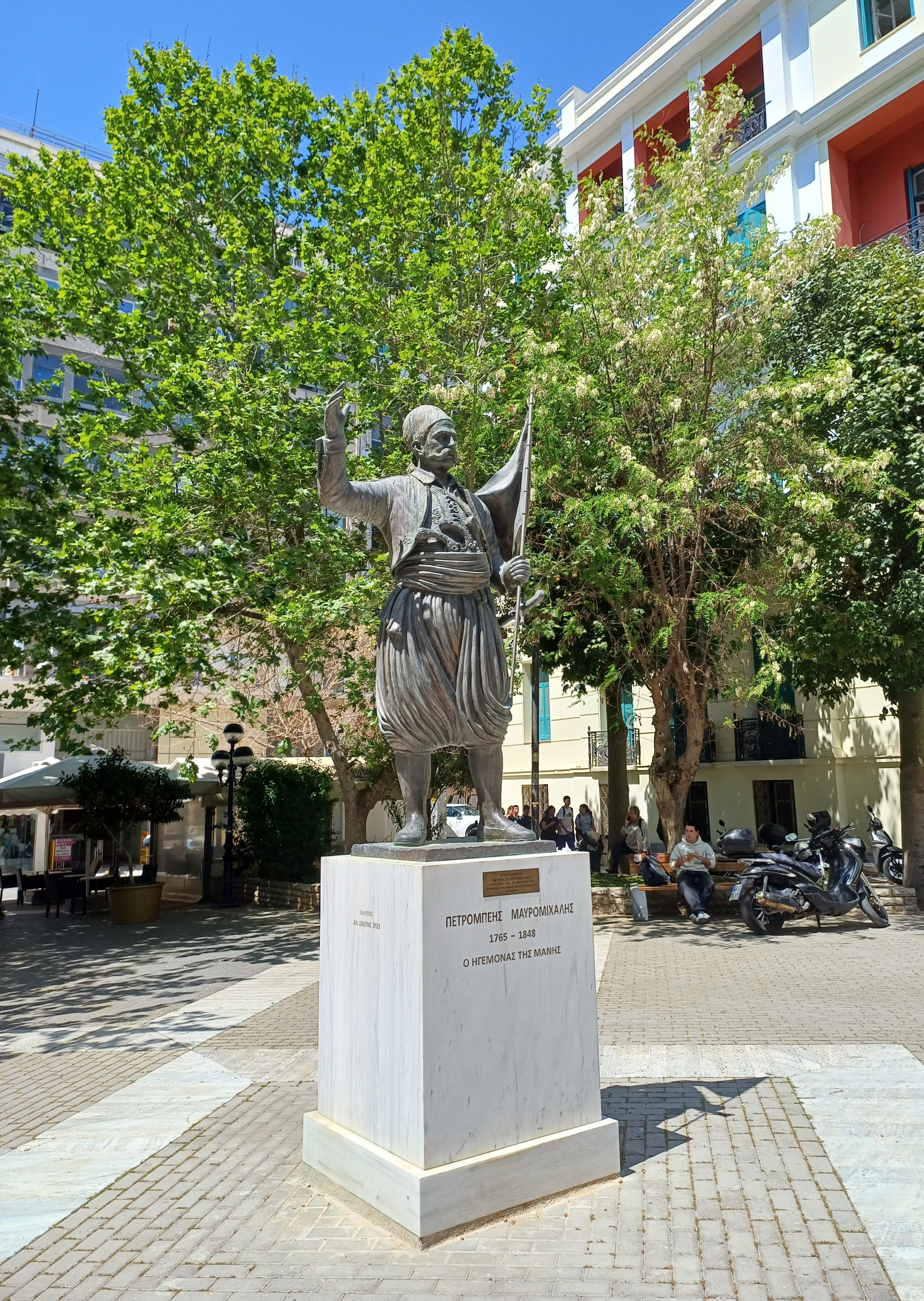
A monument of Mavromichalis in Piraeus

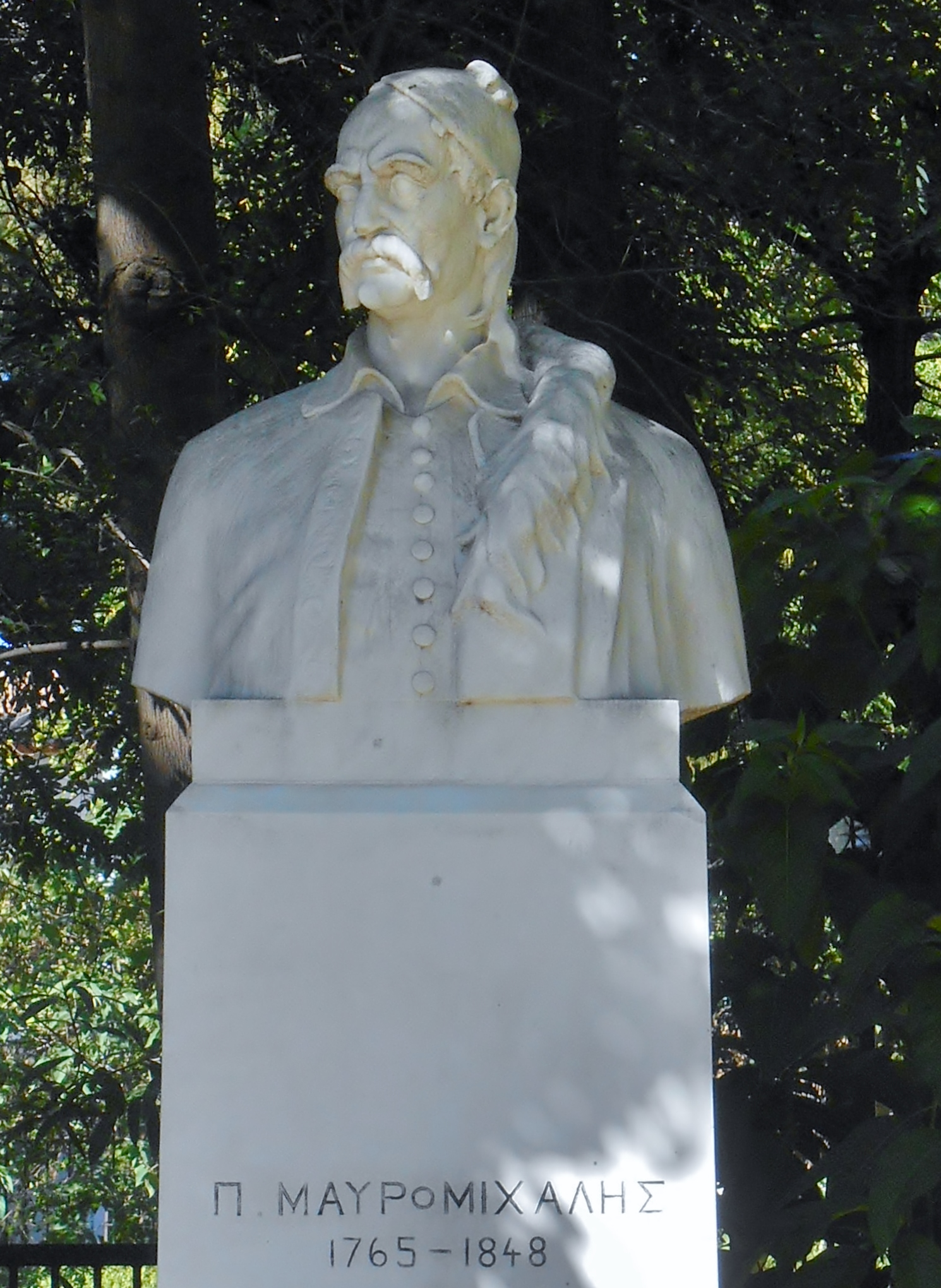
A monument of Mavromichalis in Pedion tou Areos

== Sources ==
- Κ. Ζησίου, Οι Μαυρομιχάλαι. Συλλογή των περί αυτών γραφέντων, (K. Zisiou, The Mavromichalai. Collection of their own scripts, Athens,1903)
- Ανάργυρου Κουτσιλιέρη, Ιστορία της Μάνης, (Anargiros Koutsilieris, History of Mani, Athens, 1996)
- Αγαπητός Σ. Αγαπητός (1877). Οι Ένδοξοι Έλληνες του 1821, ή Οι Πρωταγωνισταί της Ελλάδος σελ. 40-47. Τυπογραφείον Α. Σ. Αγαπητού, Εν Πάτραις -ανακτήθηκε 13 Αυγούστου 2009-. (Agapitos S. Agapitos, The 1821 Glorious Greeks, The Protagonists of Greece, pg 40-47. A.S. Agapitou Press, Patras -1877 - reimpression 8.13.2009)

Preceded by Theodorobey Grigorakis	Bey of Mani; 1815–1821	Greek War of Independence
Political offices
Preceded by Alexandros Mavrokordatos	President of the Executive; 26 April 1823 – 5 January 1824	Succeeded by Georgios Kountouriotis
