= Battle of Valtetsi =

1821 battle of the Greek War of Independence

- Part of the Greek War of Independence
Date	24 May 1821 (12 May Julian)
Location	Valtetsi, Morea Eyalet, Ottoman Empire (now Arcadia, Greece)
Result	Greek victory

Belligerents
Greek revolutionaries: Maniot Forces	Ottoman Empire

Commanders and leaders
Theodoros Kolokotronis; Anagnostaras; Dimitrios Plapoutas; Kyriakoulis Mavromichalis; Ilias Mavromichalis, Ioannis Mavromichalis, Mitropetrovas	Kâhya Mustafa Bey; Ruby Bey

Strength
3,000	5,000

Casualties and losses
4 dead, 17 wounded	1,149 dead and injured

The Battle of Valtetsi was fought on 24 May 1821 in Valtetsi between the Ottoman army and Greek revolutionaries.

== Background ==
The Greek War of Independence officially began on 25 March 1821. During the war, the city of Tripoli in Arcadia, central Peloponnesus, became a prime objective of the Greek revolutionary army.

Only the warlike Maniots were experts in the art of battle. Besides the Maniots, only the Klephts who lived in the mountains and the Armatoloi, who had for centuries been hired by the local Turkish authorities initially to guard the mountain passes and later for the general keeping of law and order, were coherent military forces.

During April 1821, the initially small Greek forces in the area were slowly augmented by men from the nearby villages who declared Kolokotronis as Archistratigos, the man of overall command.

Immediately, Kolokotronis established armed camps near the villages of Levidi, Piana, Chrysovitsi, Vervena and Valtetsi which were former rebel's dens. These villages became the Greek headquarters for the preparation of the siege of Ottoman strongholds during the absence of Hursid Pasha (the governor of Morea) who was leading an expedition against the apostate Ali Pasha of Janina under the Sublime Porte's special command.

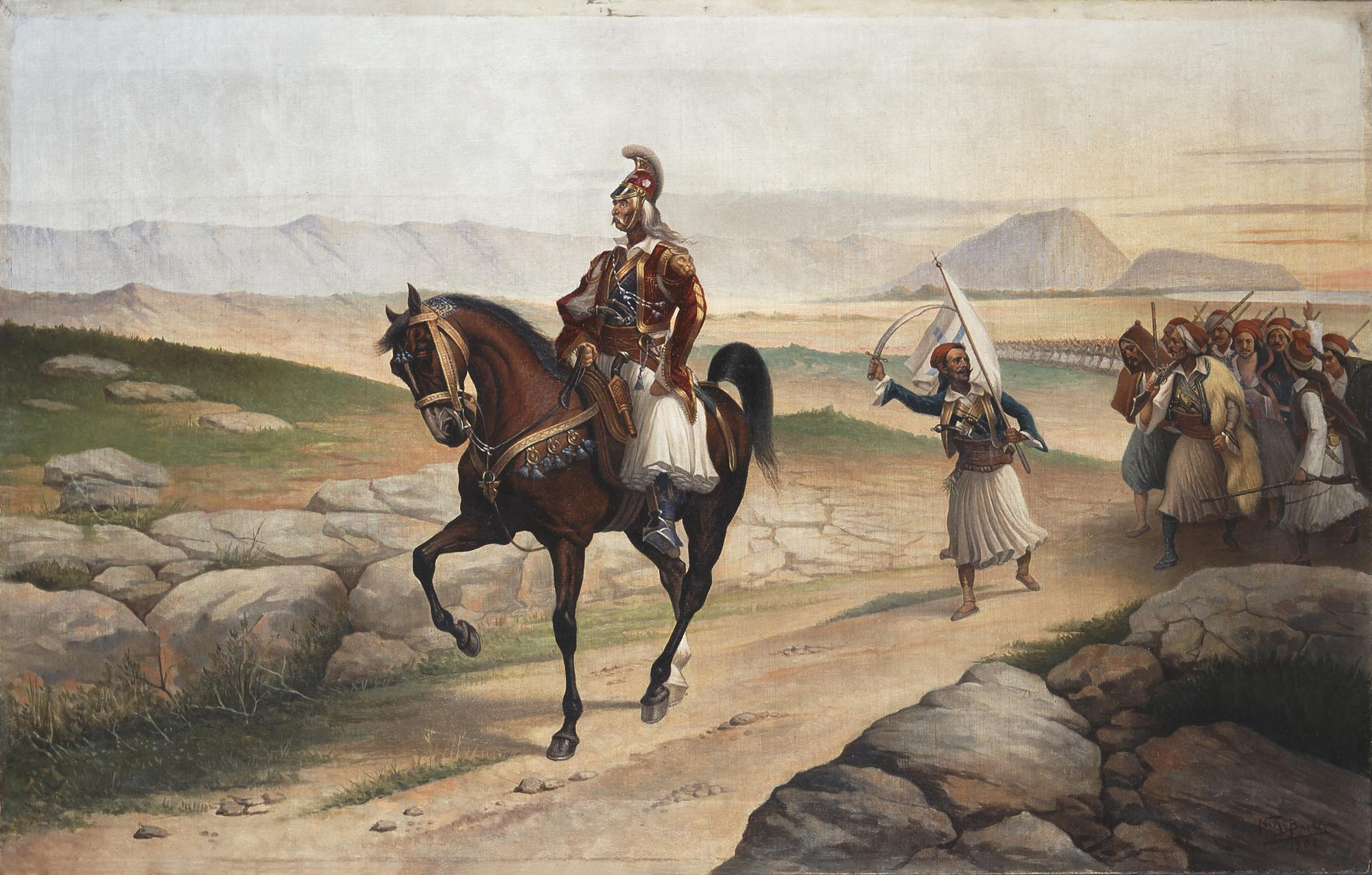
Kolokotronis leading his army towards Valtetsi

== Battle ==
On 6 May 1821, the Ottoman forces of Tripoli first raided the Greeks based in Valtetsi. The Muslims were then reinforced on 7 May by 4,000 Albanians under Kâhya Mustafa Bey, the Kehayabey of Hursid Pasha, coming from Argolis.

A couple of weeks later, a combined Turkish and Albanian force of 5,000 men, under the command of Kâhya Mustafa Bey, set out to destroy the Greek positions at Valtetsi. The main force, under Rubi Bey, was sent directly to assault the Greek camp defended by 2,300 revolutionaries.

The defensive strategy of the Greek revolutionaries was to fortify four tower houses in the area following the pyrgospitia Maniot pattern. Kyriakoulis Mavromichalis as field-commander defended the first tower with 120 men. Ilias Mavromichalis was in charge of the second tower with 250 men. Ioannis Mavromichalis commanded the third tower with 350 men and septuagenarian Mitropetrovas commanded the last tower with 80 men.

On 24 May, Rubi Bey gave orders to storm the village, while a small force took a position to cut off the Greeks' expected retreat to mountain paths. Rubi Bey then demanded the rebels to surrender their weapons. When the Greeks refused, Rubi Bey began his full assault. The Turkish and Albanian forces managed to capture some positions including the water supply but a fierce resistance obliged them to demand for Kâhya Mustafa's reinforcements.

In the meantime, 700 Greeks, under the command of Theodoros Kolokotronis, arrived and attacked the Turks on their flanks weakening their operational power. Then another Greek contingent under Dimitrios Plapoutas made a significant entrance in the battle so as to give vital support to the exhausted rebels.

Against Turkish expectations, the Greeks maintained their positions as the Turkish cavalry became ineffective in the battle on rocky slopes. All Turkish and Albanian attacks were repelled and finally Rubi Bey ordered a retreat which turned into a rout after the Greeks abandoned their defensive posture and counterattacked, completely breaking the enemy lines.

According to an old Maniot folk tradition, Captain Kyriakoulis Mavromichalis while watching the Turkalbanians in retreat is said to have shouted:

Που πας βρε κερατόμπεη, (Where are you going, you cuckold Bey,)
και συ σκυλαρβανίτη; (and you, Albanian dog?)
Δεν είν’ της Κόρθος τα χωριά, (These are neither the villages of Corinth,)
τ’ Αργίτικα κορίτσια, (nor the Argive girls,)
εδώ το λένε Τρίκορφα, (This place is called Trikorfa,)
εδώ το λεν’ Βαλτέτσι. (this place is called Valtetsi.)
— Captain Kyriakoulis

In the end, the Greeks won a decisive victory capturing two cannons and ammunition. The battle itself lasted nearly 24 hours. The casualties were unexpectedly heavy for the Ottoman army: 600 dead compared to the 4 killed and 17 wounded for the Greek rebels.

== Aftermath ==
The Battle of Valtetsi was the first decisive Greek victory in their struggle for freedom. The victory demonstrated that an organized rebel force could face and defeat the Ottoman military machine. The victory also strengthened the morale and self-confidence of the Greek revolutionaries and encouraged them to continue the fight for their freedom. Finally, the victory showed that control of the central Peloponnesus remained within the walls of Tripoli.

According to his memoirs, Kolokotronis said to his compatriots: We must render up thanksgivings for this day, which should be kept holy forever, as the day upon which our Motherland achieved her freedom.
