= Antonios Mavromichalis =

Greek revolutionary, military officer and politician (1792–1873)

- Αντώνης Μαυρομιχάλης

Member of the Greek Senate
- In office 1847–1862
- Monarch: Otto

Member of Parliament for Kalamata
- In office 1862–1864

Personal details
- Born: 1792 Mani, Ottoman Empire (now Greece)
- Died: 1873 (aged 80–81) Kalamata, Kingdom of Greece
- Relations: Pierros Mavromichalis (father)

Military service
- Allegiance: Kingdom of Greece
- Branch/service: Hellenic Army
- Years of service: 1823–1847
- Rank: General
- Battles/wars: Greek War of Independence

Antonios Mavromichalis (Greek: Αντώνης Μαυρομιχάλης; c. 1792 – 1873) was a Greek revolutionary, military officer and politician.

== Biography ==
He was born in Mani to Pierros Mavromichalis, of the notable Mavromichalis clan. He fought against Ali Pasha, and was captured and remained for years in Constantinople as a Turkish hostage. He managed to escape however shortly before the outbreak of the Greek War of Independence, subsequently participating in various battles. In 1823 he was named general of the rebels' irregular forces.

In 1830, he led a Maniot rebellion against Governor Ioannis Kapodistrias. Under King Otto, he joined the newly created Greek Gendarmerie and later transferred to the regular army, reaching general rank. He served as Otto's aide-de-camp and was appointed a member of the Senate in 1847. In 1862, he was an MP for Kalamata.

He died in Kalamata in 1873. He had two sons, both Army officers: Periklis Pierrakos-Mavromichalis, and Georgios P. Mavromichalis, who was killed during the Greco-Turkish War of 1897.
