= Areopoli =

Town in Laconia, Greece

Areopolis Αρεόπολη
- Community
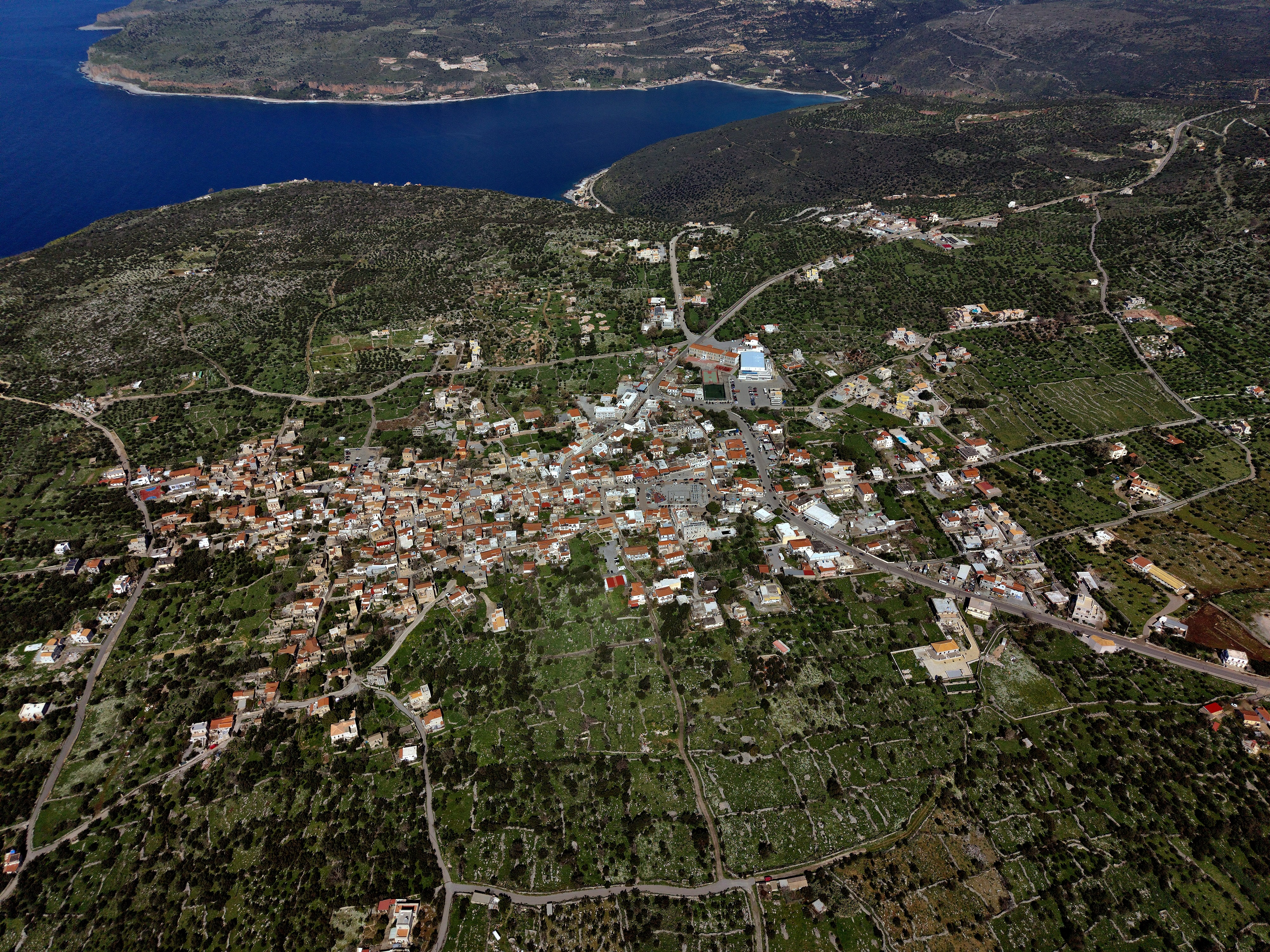
- Areopoli

- Location within Greece
- Coordinates: 36°39.95′N 22°22.90′E
- Country: Greece
- Administrative region: Peloponnese
- Regional unit: Laconia
- Municipality: East Mani
- Municipal unit: Oitylo
- Elevation: 255 m (837 ft)

Population (2021)
  - Community: 927
- Time zone: UTC+2 (EET)
  - Summer (DST): UTC+3 (EEST)
- Postal code: 230 62
- Area code: 27330
- Vehicle registration: ΑΚ
- Website: www.dimosoitilou.gr/gr/dd/areopoli/ar.htm

Areopoli (Greek: Αρεόπολη; before 1912 Τσίμοβα, Tsimova) is a town on the Mani Peninsula, Laconia, Greece.

The word Areopoli, which means "city of Ares", the ancient Greek god of war, became the official name in 1912. It was the seat of Oitylo municipality. The Greek War of Independence was started at Areopoli on March 17, 1821 by Petros Pierrakos, also known as Petros Mavromichalis, the last bey of Mani. Now Areopoli has grown into a flourishing town. Its tower houses, constructed with field stones, are distinct from the traditional blue and white buildings that characterize many Greek villages.

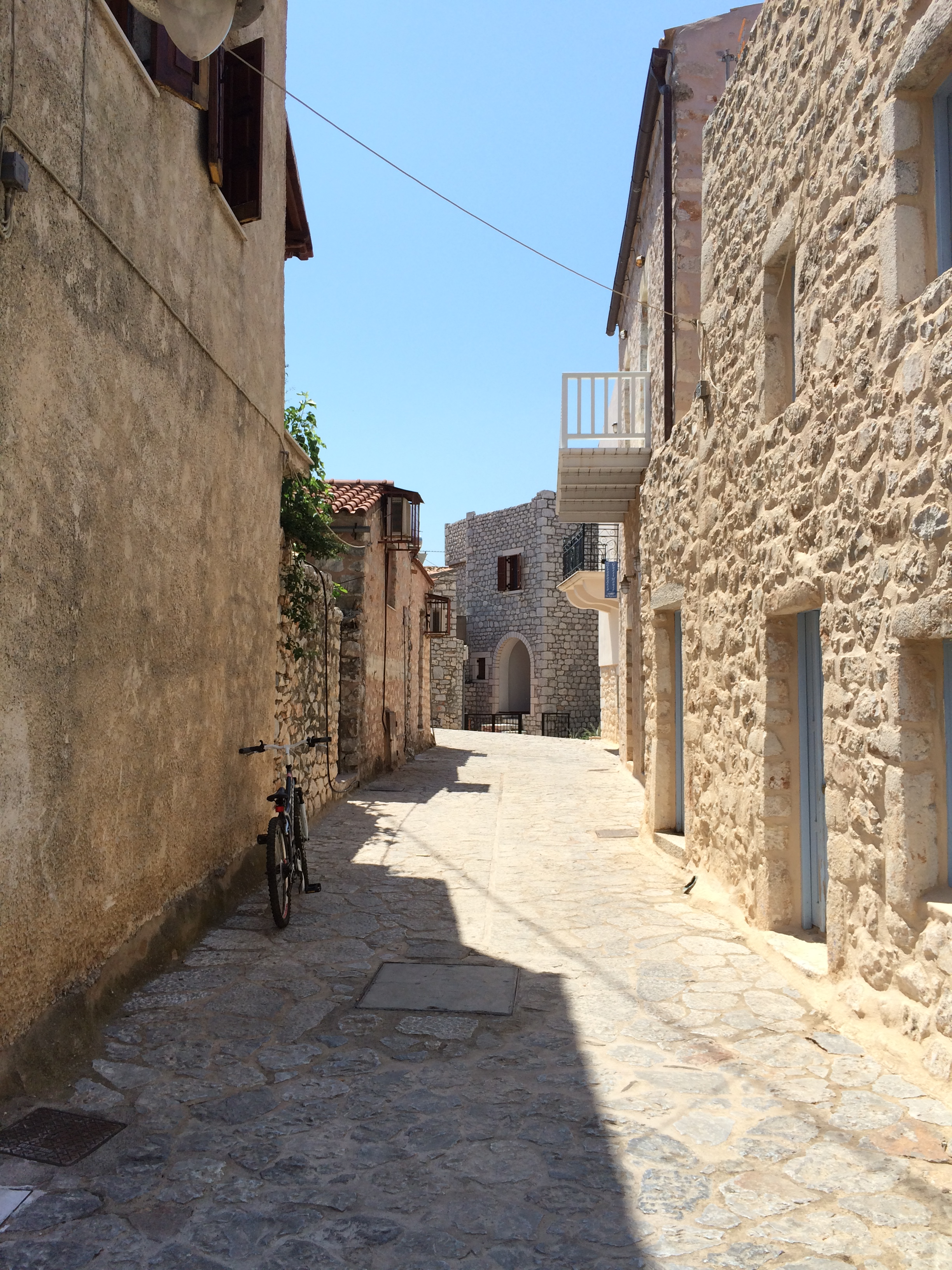
Street in Areopoli

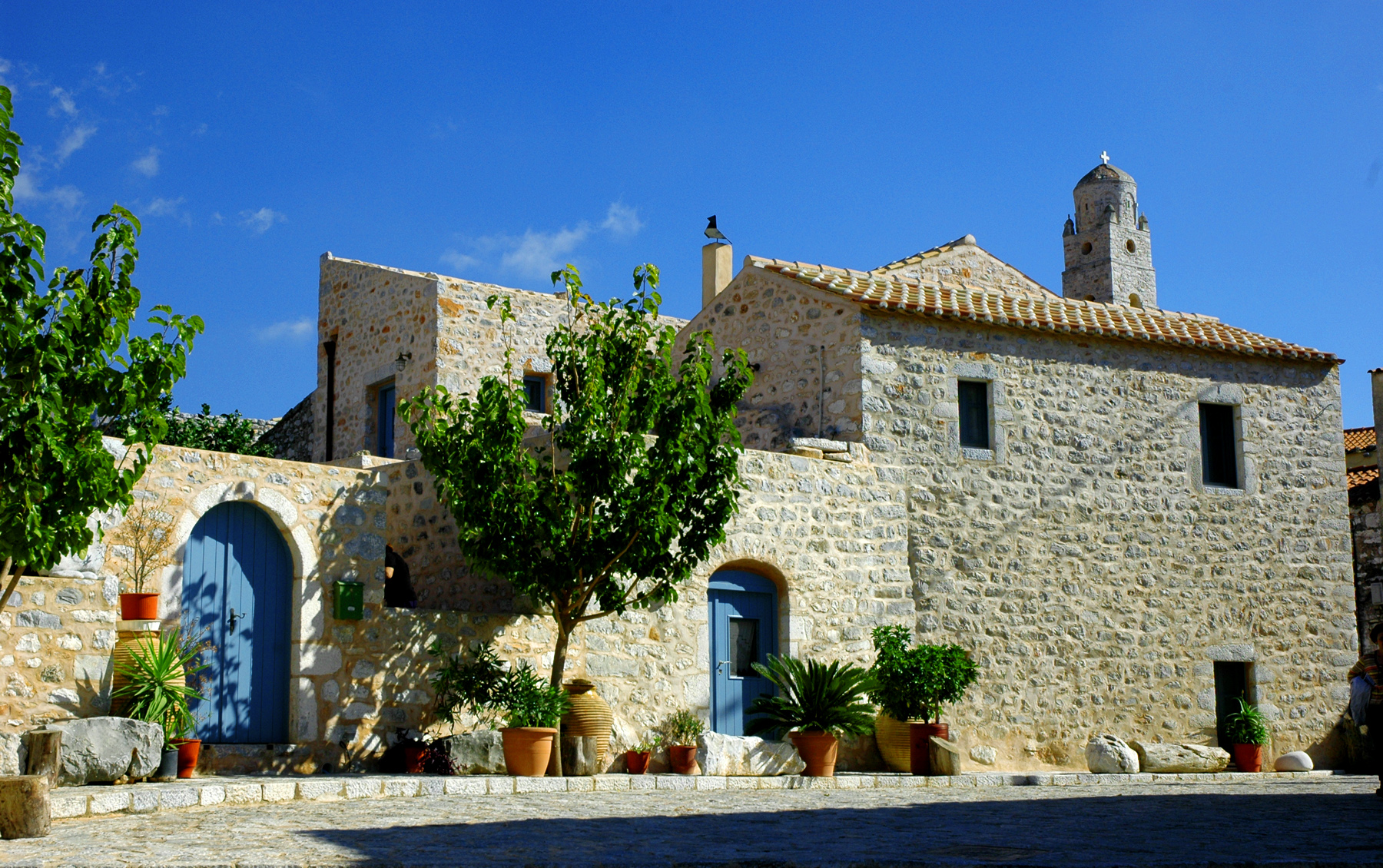
Stone houses

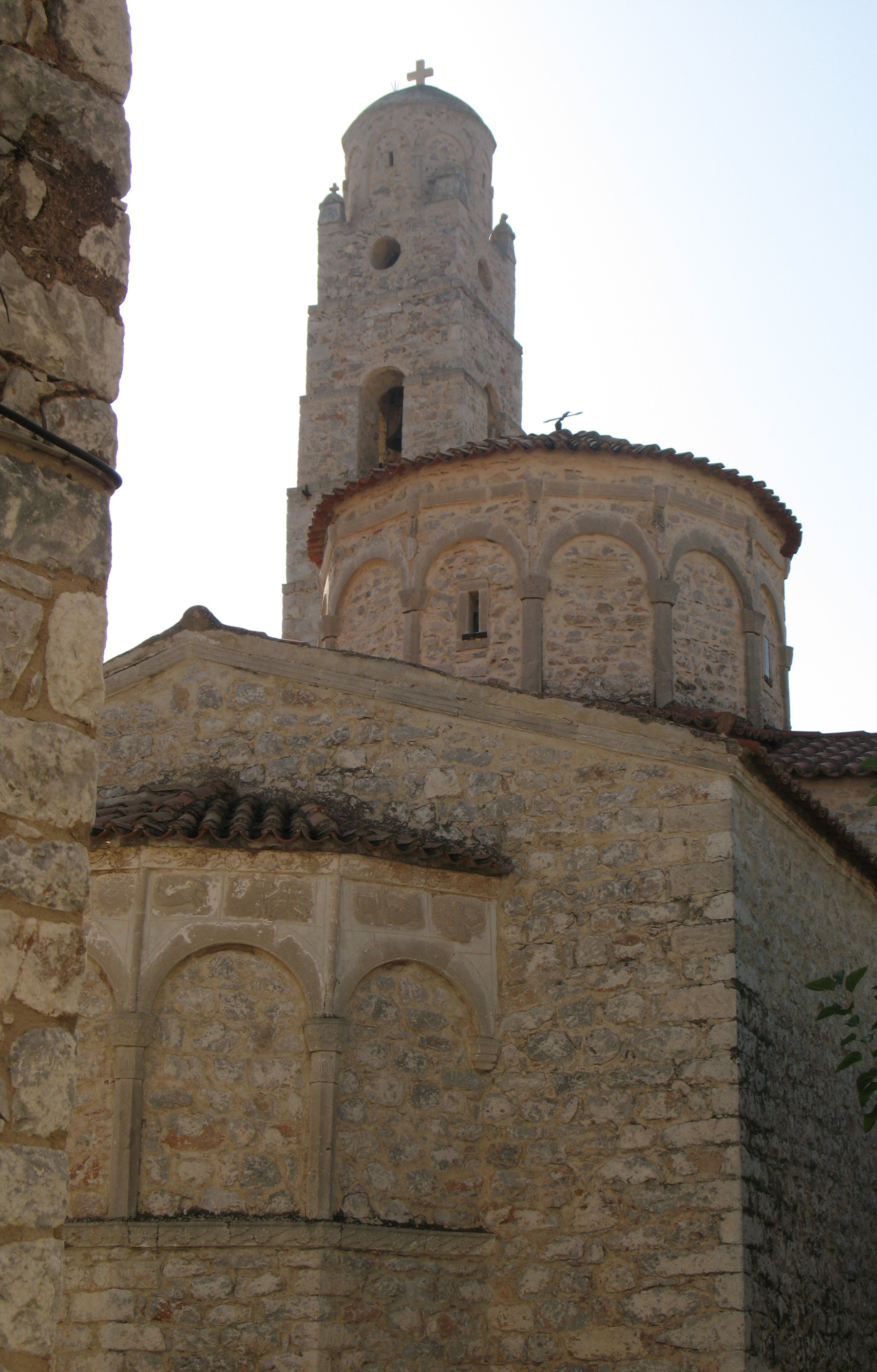
Saints Taxiarches Church

Areopoli is situated near the west coast of the Mani Peninsula, 1.5 km from its port Limeni. It is 20 km southwest of Gytheio. There is lively open air market in the main square each Saturday, with a lot of local producers present.

== History ==
On 17 March 1821, the first flag of the Greek War of Independence was raised in Taxiarchon Square. In June 1826, Ibrahim Pasha landed near Areopoli but was repulsed after a battle at Dyros. By 1829, Areopoli was home to 290 families. Throughout the 19th century and into the mid-20th century, the population of Areopoli fluctuated between 1,100 and 2,000 inhabitants. The settlement expanded eastward, along the main road where a market was established. Following the war, both population and commercial activity declined, yet Areopoli remained the largest settlement in the Mani Peninsula.

== Historical population ==
Year	Population
1981	738
1991	759
2001	988
2011	1,014
2021	927

== Notable people ==
- Koulis Alepis (1903-1986), poet
- Dimitrios Kalapothakis, journalist
- Maria Kolokouri (1977–2014), black metal vocalist and multi-instrumentalist
- Kyriakos Pierrakakis, president of the Eurogroup
- Stylianos Pierrakos (Stylianos Mavromichalis) (1902–1981), former Prime Minister of Greece
- Georgios Polymenakos, military officer
- Gregorios Skalkeas (1926-2018), Chancellor of the University of Central Greece

== See also ==
- List of settlements in Laconia
