= Kyriakoulis Mavromichalis =

Greek politician (1850–1916)

- Κυριακούλης Μαυρομιχάλης
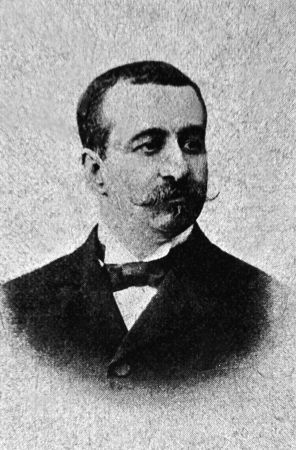

Prime Minister of Greece
- In office 15 August 1909 – 18 January 1910
- Monarch: George I
- Preceded by: Dimitrios Rallis
- Succeeded by: Stefanos Dragoumis

Personal details
- Born: 1850 Athens, Greece
- Died: 1916 (aged 65–66) Athens, Greece
- Party: National
- Relatives: Mavromichalis family Aspasia Manos (great-niece)

Kyriakoulis Petrou Mavromichalis (Greek: Κυριακούλης Μαυρομιχάλης; 1850–1916) was a Greek politician of the late 19th and early 20th centuries who briefly served as Prime Minister of Greece.

== Biography ==
Mavromichalis was born in Athens in 1850 into the renowned Mavromichalis family of Mani, which had fought during the Greek War of Independence. He was first elected to the Hellenic Parliament in 1879 and served as: Interior Minister (1895–1897, 1902–1903 and 1905) and Minister for Military Affairs (1904–1905), before becoming Prime Minister of Greece following the Goudi Revolt by the Military League and the fall of the Dimitrios Rallis government in 1909.

Under pressure from the League, Mavromichalis passed a large amount of ground-breaking legislation that the League demanded, including organization of the army, the justice and educational systems, and governmental organization.

Mavromichalis resigned as prime minister in January 1910, after a disagreement with the Military League. He died in Athens in 1916 and was buried with full honours. He was a great-uncle of Princess Aspasia of Greece.

Political offices
Preceded by Dimitrios Rallis	Prime Minister of Greece; 15 August 1909 – 18 January 1910	Succeeded by Stefanos Dragoumis
