= Vervena =

Village in the Peloponnese, Greece

Coordinates: 37°22′19″N 22°27′53″E

Vervena (Greek: Βέρβενα), also known as Vervaina (Βέρβαινα), and sometimes incorrectly referred to as Ano Vervena (Άνω Βέρβενα), is a mountainous village in the region of Kynouria, within the Arcadia regional unit of Greece. It is part of the Municipality of North Kynouria.

The village is situated on the northern slopes of Mount Parnon at an elevation of 1,160 meters, making it the highest settlement in the area. It is located 11 kilometers from Tegea, 22 kilometers from Tripoli, and 45 kilometers from the coastal town of Astros. Due to its high altitude, the residents of Vervena often maintain secondary homes in other nearby plain locations, including Astros, Kato Vervena, Xiropigado, and Kiveri in Argolis. Fewer inhabitants also reside in surrounding villages such as Zavitsa, Moustos, and various settlements in Argolis (e.g., Galaneika, Tyrovoleika, Papaleika, Diamantogiannika).

Vervena is characterized by its traditional stone-built houses and features three significant churches: the marble Church of the Dormition of the Theotokos, the village's main church; the Church of Saint John the Forerunner, an Athonite-style cross-shaped church; and the small Church of Saint Athanasios, built by the local chieftain Yiannakis Kritikos. Another notable site is the Chapel of Prophet Elias, located at the summit of Mount Parnon.

The village celebrates religious festivals on July 20 (Feast of Prophet Elias), July 25 (Dormition of Saint Anna), and August 15 (Dormition of the Theotokos). Additionally, Vervena has two historical school buildings, dating from 1837 and 1908.

== History ==
=== Antiquity ===
In antiquity, the area around present-day Vervena was likely inhabited by the Vervinians, an Arcadian tribe, as mentioned by the lexicographer Hesychius The region was part of ancient Arcadia.

The earliest remains identified in the area date back to the 2nd millennium BCE, consisting of stone tools found at the site of Petra, where the homonymous spring is located. At the site of Panteleimon, remnants of worship dedicated to the goddess Artemis Knakeatis were discovered, dating from the 9th century BCE through the Hellenistic period. During the 6th century BCE, a fully marble Doric temple was constructed at this location, which was later excavated and studied by Konstantinos Romaios, a professor at the Aristotle University of Thessaloniki.

Further evidence of human settlement during the Hellenistic and Roman periods has been found within the village itself.

Additional traces of habitation in the area around Verbena are preserved from the time of Justinian onward.

=== Byzantine and Ottoman Periods ===
Evidence of the village's existence during the Byzantine period is provided by the ruins of settlements located around the present-day village. The Byzantine settlement appears to have flourished in the 12th century CE, as evidenced by the Byzantine church whose architectural elements are incorporated into the 18th-century Church of Saint John the Forerunner.

For a period, the area was depopulated, possibly due to an epidemic, but it was repopulated in the 17th century. According to a census conducted by the Venetians, the village was recorded to have 91 families.

The village experienced prosperity during the 18th century, a period in which several tower houses were built, including those of the Papaioannou, Papathanasiou, Avgousti, and Kritikos families. During this time, the Great Fountain of the village was also constructed. This fountain, made entirely of marble, features symbolic relief carvings and has four spouts that flow year-round.

In 1806, the village was destroyed by the pursued klephts of Theodoros Kolokotronis after the villagers refused to assist them, as such support would have led to severe consequences. Kolokotronis recounts the event in his "Diigisi" (Narrative):

"We sent a message to Verbena asking them to send us bread and fodder, but they replied: 'We have bullets and gunpowder,' and we went and destroyed them."

=== Vervena in the Greek War of Independence (1821) ===
Vervena is primarily known today for its pivotal role during the Greek War of Independence. Due to its strategic location, which provided safe surveillance of Tripolitza (modern Tripolis), Theodoros Kolokotronis established a military camp in the village on March 25, 1821. This camp played a decisive role in the Fall of Tripolitza, with commanders including Theodoritus of Vresthene and later the Laconian chieftain Panagiotis Yatrakos.

In June 1825, the camp was re-established as a General Headquarters to confront the forces of Ibrahim Pasha, led by commanders Dimitrios Ypsilantis, Konstantinos Mavromichalis, and later Theodoros Kolokotronis. It was re-established again in August 1826.

The camp at Vervena was a significant threat to the Ottoman forces in Tripolitza, and on the morning of May 18, 1821, the Ottomans sent over 6,000 soldiers, led by Mustafa Bey or Kehaya Bey, to dissolve the camp. To achieve this with minimal losses, they aimed to neutralize two outposts located in Doliana and Dragouni, each manned by about 100 fighters. While the main Ottoman force headed toward Vervena, two separate units were dispatched to Doliana and Dragouni.The unit tasked with capturing the Dragouni outpost succeeded in its objective and then proceeded toward Vervena. However, the Ottoman unit sent to Doliana, which included Mustafa Bey and two cannons, met resistance from the Doliana garrison, which included Nikitaras (Nikitas Stamatelopoulos) and 150 of his men. Nikitaras, who had been traveling from Valtetsi and Vervena to Argos, had spent the night in Doliana. Having departed Doliana early the next morning, after learning of the Ottoman approach, he returned to the village, where he fortified himself and the Doliana defenders in 13 houses, with a total of 250–300 men. The Ottomans easily entered the village, forcing the inhabitants to flee to the surrounding mountains. The Ottoman forces looted and set fire to village houses, then besieged the 13 fortified houses where the Greek fighters held out.

Upon learning that the Ottomans were advancing towards Doliana, a Greek force of 500 men, led by Panagiotis Yatrakos, was dispatched from the Vervena camp to intercept them. On their way to Doliana, they encountered the main Ottoman force advancing toward Verven at "Stavros". A three-hour battle ensued in which the Greeks, unable to repel the numerically superior enemy, withdrew to Vervena without sustaining casualties. The Ottomans then established themselves on the hill of Louvros above Vervena, where they raised their flag.

Meanwhile, in Doliana, the Greek defenders, including Nikitaras and his men, held out against the Ottomans throughout the day until dusk.

At noon, the Ottomans, led by Rubi Bey, attempted to storm Vervena. The Greek defenders, entrenched in stone-built houses and makeshift fortifications around the village, mounted a determined resistance. Greek commanders, including Antonis and Konstantinos Mavromichalis, Nikolaos Delygiannis, Panagiotis Yatrakos, and Vresthenis Theodoritos, encouraged their men, reminding them of their earlier victory at Valtetsi.

Rubi then ordered an assault with yataghans. The Ottomans charged the fortifications but were repelled by the intense fire from the Greeks and retreated to the Louvros hill with heavy losses. The Greek defenders, though encouraged by their success, were still troubled by the sight of the Ottoman flag flying over them. At this point, a Maniot fighter from the Mavromichalis corps took it upon himself to bring down the flag. He succeeded, killing the flag bearer in the process. The Ottomans, disturbed by the loss, sent another flag bearer to raise the flag again, but the Maniot killed him as well.

This event was seen by the Greeks as a good omen, and their morale was lifted. They emerged from their homes and fortifications and charged the Ottomans, shouting battle cries. The Ottomans, now demoralized, began to retreat toward Doliana. The pursuit was joined by the women of Verbena, led by Marigō Karampela (also known as Bambu).

The retreating Ottomans made a stand at Kossyvorema, west of Doliana, where they tried to regroup. As the sun began to set, the Greeks launched a final assault, chasing the Ottomans both from Kossyvorema and into Doliana. The Ottoman force under Khechayambeis, which had been besieging Nikitaras, was thrown into disarray. After a brief skirmish, during which a group of Vervena fighters captured two Ottoman cannons, Khechayambeis ordered a retreat. The Ottomans abandoned Doliana, pursued by the Greeks.

Nikitaras, who had been trapped during the siege, was freed and joined the Greek forces from Vervena in the pursuit of the Ottoman troops. The chase continued as far as Kouvli, but it was called off when darkness fell, preventing the Greeks from distinguishing the enemy from their own forces.

The Greek victory at the Battle of Vervena, which extended into Doliana, was a turning point in the Revolution. It strengthened the resolve of the Greek forces and was crucial in the events that led to the fall of Tripolitza.

On June 21, 1821, an official reception was held in Vervena to honor Dimitrios Ypsilantis, where the leadership of the Revolution was to be handed over to him. The event was attended by the Peloponnesian Senate, local notables, military commanders, and a large crowd of soldiers and civilians, numbering around ten thousand.

On July 9, 1825, Ibrahim Pasha succeeded in dissolving the Vervena camp. Andreas Kontakis, along with 11 other fighters, fortified themselves in the three-story tower of Papakonstantinou, which the Arabs failed to capture, and they withdrew with significant losses. The camp was re-established two days later.

In August 1825, Theodoros Kolokotronis, with the strength of the Vervena camp, destroyed the mills of Piana and Davia, which were supplying Ibrahim's army in Tripoli.

Towards the end of July 1826, Kolokotronis, using the strength of the Vervena camp, which was further reinforced with cavalry, set an ambush in the plains of Tegea and annihilated 400 Arabs.

Monuments of the Greek War of Independence in Vervena

- The old three-story tower of Papakonstantinou in the center of the village.
- The tower of Kritikos, where the Food Caretaking Center (known as the Cellar) was housed for the needs of the camp.
- The three-story tower of Avgoustis, which was Kolokotronis' residence.
- The tower of Adraktas, the residence of the Mavromichalis family.
- The tower of Marlagouzos (Papathanasiou).
- The house of the local chief Konstantinos Karampelas.
- The Great Fountain of the village, built with marble in 1788.
- The monument of the battle, created by the sculptor professor Michail Tobros (1920).
- The monument at the site of Dimitrios Ypsilantis' speech, in the shape of an open tablet made of marble, created by the sculptor Michail Tobros.

Reenactment and annual celebration of the Battle of Vervena

Since 1954, the villagers have decided to carry out reenactments of the battle and other historical events of the village. Since then, five reenactments have taken place.

The anniversary of the battle was traditionally celebrated with a doxology at the Metropolitan Church of the Dormition of the Theotokos and a wreath-laying ceremony at the battle memorial. Since 2021, it has been officially celebrated, following a Presidential Decree, as a local national holiday, with a doxology, the delivery of a commemorative speech, wreath-laying by officials, traditional dances, and an official meal.
