= Greek revolutionary organizations =

Organization list

This list includes revolutionary organizations aimed at liberating and unifying Greek-inhabited territories into the historical national state of Greece.

| Organization | Active | Notes | Image |
|---|---|---|---|
| Ellinoglosso Xenodocheio | 1814 | Established in Paris. Provided education for Greeks and prepared for a future struggle against Ottoman rule. | |
| Filiki Etaireia | 1814–21 | Established in Odessa. Organizer of the Greek War of Independence. | |
| Philorthodox Society | 1839 | Secret organization established in June 1839 by Nikitaras and Georgios Kapodistrias, associated with the Russian Party. Uncovered in December 1839. | |
| Party of Radicals | 1848–1862 | Political party in the Ioanian Islands for enosis. | |
| Revolutionary Assembly at Aghia Kyriaki | 1866 | Fought the Cretan revolt (1866–1869) for enosis. | |
| National Defence and Fraternity | 1877 | Two revolutionary organizations established in 1877 in Epirus. Fought in the Epirus Revolt of 1878 for enosis. | |
| Cretan Committee | 1878 | Fought the Cretan revolt (1878) for enosis. | |
| Ethniki Etaireia | 1894–96 | Established in Athens. Advocated for the liberation of all Greek-inhabited territories. Considered to be responsible for the start of the Greco-Turkish War (1897). | |
| Hellenic Macedonian Committee | 1890s–1908 | Established in Athens. Headquartered in the Greek consulate of Thessaloniki. Coordinator of Greek efforts during the Macedonian Struggle. | |
| Pontus Society | 1904–1923 | Secret society working for the liberation of the Republic of Pontus. | |
| Panepirotic Assembly | 1914 | Established in Argyrokastro. Declared independence from Albania and the creation of the Autonomous Republic of Northern Epirus. | |
| Central Committee of the Northern Epirote Struggle | 1943 | Ethnic Greek resistance movement in Northern Epirus (part of Communist Albania). | |
| EOKA | 1955–59 | Established in British Cyprus. Waged a guerilla war against the British to achieve union with Greece, causing the Cyprus Emergency. Led to the independence of Cyprus. | |
| EOKA B | 1971–74 | Established in the Republic of Cyprus. Involved in the 1974 Cypriot coup d'état and the Turkish invasion of Cyprus. | |

== See also ==
- Greek War of Independence
- Megali Idea
