= Papaioannou =

Papaioannou (Greek: Παπαϊωάννου) is a Greek surname. Notable people with the surname include:

- Antonios Papaioannou (born 1877), Greek gymnast
- Charalampos Papaioannou (born 1972), Greek judoka
- Dimitris Papaioannou (born 1964), Greek choreographer, director, dancer and artist
- Dimitrios Papaioannou (born 2001), Greek footballer
- Eleana Papaioannou (born 1983), Greek singer-songwriter
- Ezekias Papaioannou (1908–1988), Cypriot politician
- George Papaioannou (1933–1999), Greek-American bishop
- Giannis Papaioannou (1913–1972), Greek songwriter
- Ioannis Papaioannou (chess player) (born 1976), Greek chess grandmaster
- Ioannis Papaioannou (actor) (1869–1931), Greek actor
- Konstantinos Papaioannou (1899–1979), Greek physicist and mathematician
- Lakis Papaioannou (born 1956), Greek footballer
- Loukas Papaioannou (1831–1890), Greek professor
- Makis Papaioannou (born 1977), Cypriot footballer
- Miltiadis Papaioannou (born 1947), Greek politician
- Mimis Papaioannou (1942–2023), Greek footballer
- Pantelis Papaioannou (1880s–1907), Greek leader of the Macedonian Struggle
- Pavlos Papaioannou (born 1959), Greek footballer
- Ramona Papaioannou (born 1989), Cypriot sprinter
- Sofia Papaioannou (born 1969), Greek journalist
- Virginia Papaioannou (born 1946), American biologist
- Voula Papaioannou (1898–1990), Greek photographer
- Yiannis Papaioannou (1910–1989), Greek composer
