= Ano Doliana =

Ano Doliana Άνω Δολιανά
- Settlement
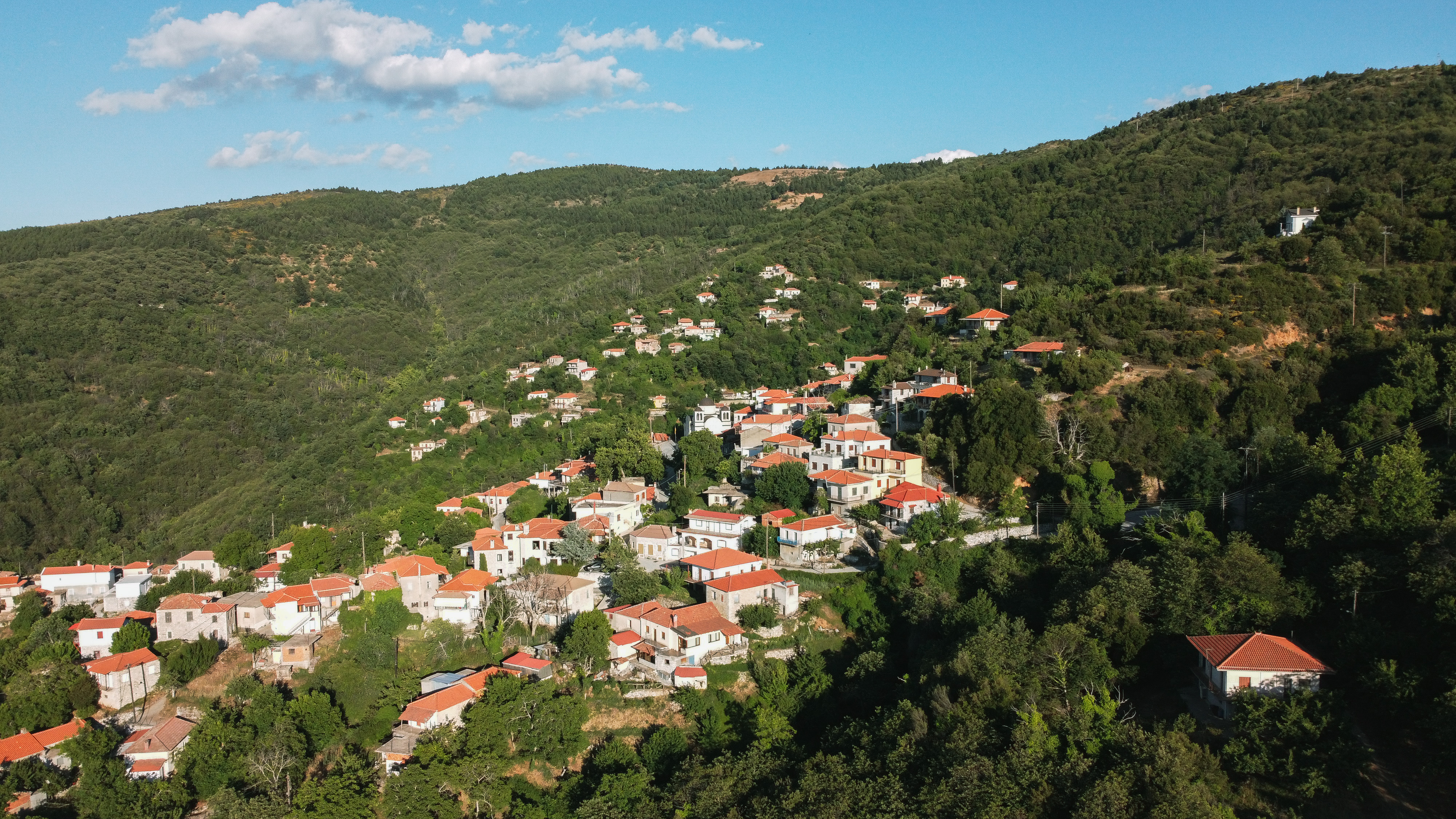
- Partial view of Ano Doliana

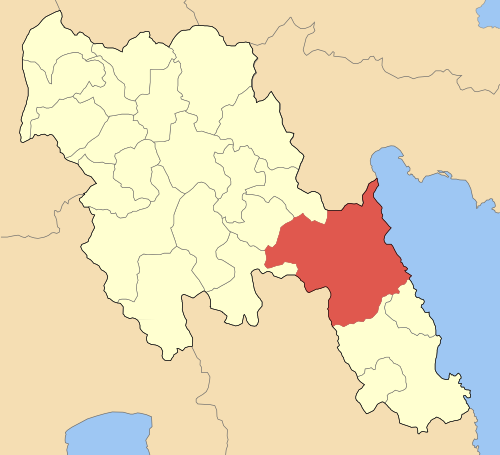
- North Kynouria municipality

- Location within Greece
- Coordinates: 37.386604°N 22.498588°E
- Country: Greece
- Administrative region: Peloponnese
- Regional unit: Arcadia
- Municipality: North Kynouria
- Community: Doliana
- Elevation: 1,000 m (3,300 ft)
- Highest elevation: 1,150 m (3,770 ft)
- Lowest elevation: 900 m (3,000 ft)

Population (2021)
  - Total: 62
- Time zone: UTC+2 (EET)
  - Summer (DST): UTC+3 (EEST)
- Postal code: 220 13
- Area code: +30 271

Ano Doliana (Ano meaning "upper", Greek: Άνω Δολιανά, Greek pronunciation: [ano ðolianaː]) is a stone-built mountainous village in the municipality of North Kynouria, in eastern Arcadia, Greece. As of 2021 it had 62 inhabitants. It is a protected traditional settlement.

It used to be the main residence of the settlers, but nowadays only a handful of them stay throughout the year, as most use it as their summer residence and instead overwinter in Kato Doliana because of the milder climate. In recent years it has emerged as a relatively popular tourist destination, with a significant number of visitors during the autumn and winter season weekends, as well as for hikers, especially during spring or autumn.

== Location ==
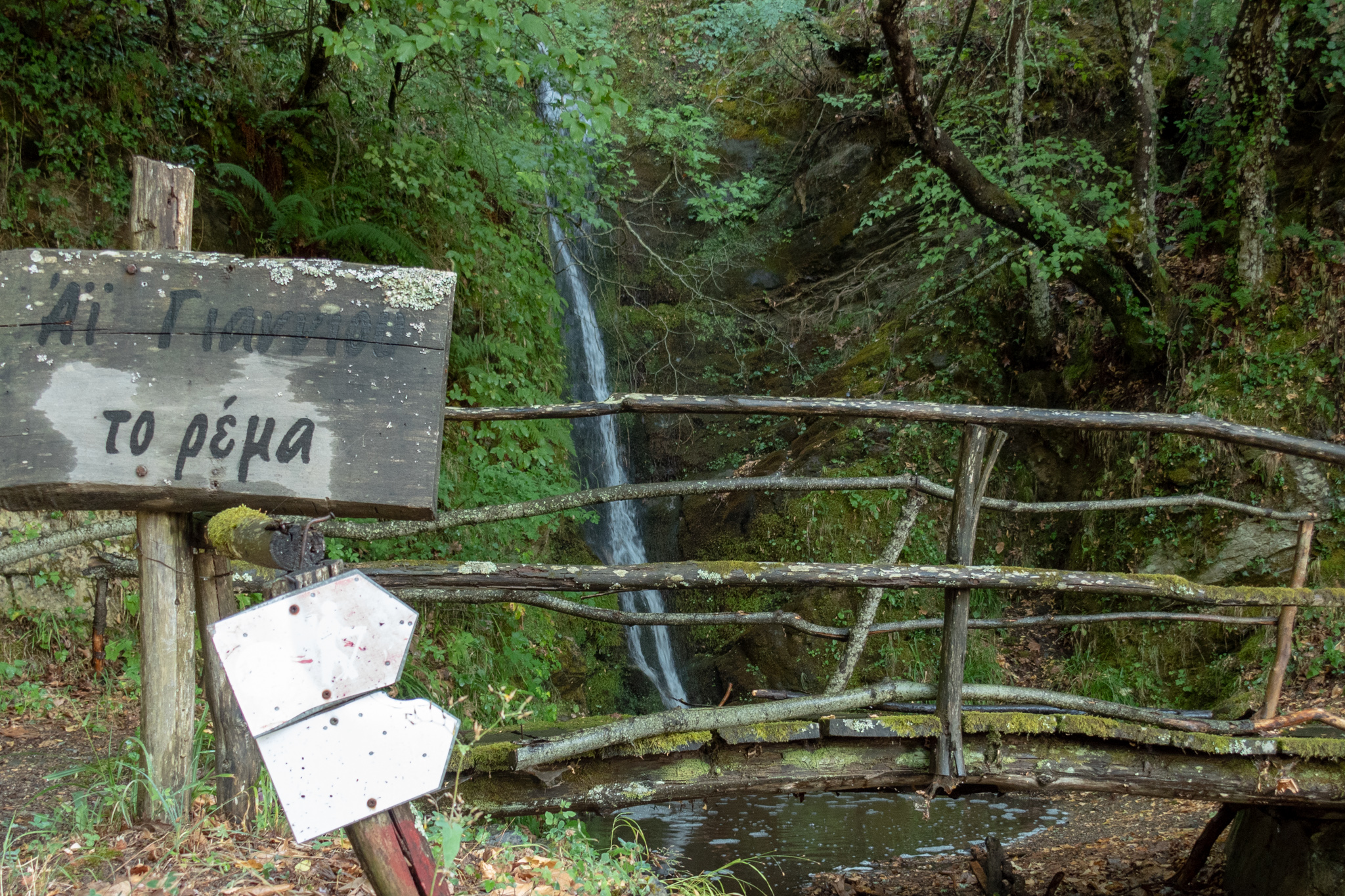
Small cascade at Saint John's ravine

The settlement is located on the southern outskirts of the plain of Tripoli. It extends at an altitude of 900 to 1.150 meters, built amphitheatrically on the northern slopes of mount Parnon, filled with fir, chestnut, platanus and cherry trees, surrounded by creeks and small waterfalls. The village overlooks the plateau of Tripoli, with the visual horizon reaching the mountains of Mainalo, Artemisio, Helmos and Erymanthos.

== Traditional architecture ==
Ano Doliana is characterised by traditional stone-built houses and cobbled streets, reflecting the architectural heritage of the mountainous settlements of Arcadia. The settlement has been officially designated as a traditional settlement under Greek legislation.

The village has two principal churches: the Church of the Dormition of the Theotokos (Panagia), constructed in 1810, and the Church of Saint George (Agios Georgios), a pre-revolutionary building associated with the events of the Battle of Doliana. The latter is listed in the Greek Archaeological Cadastre.

=== Settlement layout ===
Ano Doliana is divided into seven distinct neighborhoods:

- Pournaria (Πουρνάρια), located at the lowest point of the settlement.
- Ai-Giorgis (Αϊ-Γιώργης) and Mesochori (Μεσοχώρι) to the west.
- Panagia (Παναγία) or Agora (Αγορά), forming the central part of the village.
- Bagiounetis (Μπαγιουνέτης), located slightly higher and to the east.
- Angeleika (Αγγελέικα), extending east on a second ridge of Mount Parnon.
- Choreftarou (Χορευταρού), situated at the westernmost and highest part of the village, where a forest guesthouse is located.

== Flora and Funga ==
The village is overgrown with chestnut and platanus trees, while a natural fir forest starts at its northeastern tip. Sweet cherry trees thrive in the area, while there are sour cherry trees as well. One can also see apple trees, walnut trees, oak trees, almond-leaved pear trees, but also some hazel trees and pear trees, in a spectacle that is particularly interesting during autumn foliage of deciduous trees, fit for leaf peeping.

The area is also home to various species of mushrooms.

== Fauna ==
The fauna of the area consists of a plethora of non-migratory birds such as: European goldfinches, common blackbirds, Old World sparrows, true finches, white wagtails, calandra larks, European greenfinches and larks. Migratory birds that visit the area are: European turtle doves, common nightingales, swallows, Eurasian golden orioles and Eurasian hoopoes during spring throughout summer, but also thrushes and European robins during winter.

Mammals include European hares, martens and bats. Wild boars have reappeared in recent years, while European roe deer (Capreolus capreolus) are an even more recent reintroduction to mount Parnon, following their disappearance from the area in the early 20th century.

Other species in the area include reptiles such as snakes (vipers, common European adders, Balkan whip snakes and others), Mediterranean house geckos and lizards. Finally, arthropods such as scorpions and spiders can often be found.

== History ==
The village was established as the primary residence of the settlers, who were mainly shepherds, leaving a pastoral life and herding livestock around open areas of land. Therefore, they settled on the mountains. Doliana was used as a secondary settlement, in which the inhabitants migrated during the winter months to protect the animals from low temperatures and snow. At the same time, the mountain pastures were given time to rejuvenate. But with the modernization of life and the transformation of the main occupation of the inhabitants from livestock to cultivation, especially olive oil trees, the roles of the two settlements were reversed. Over the years and because of the abandonment of its role as a basic settlement of the inhabitants, the village has managed to maintain its graphic character relatively intact, avoiding the extensive human interventions of the modern era.

=== Early historical references ===
One of the earliest documented references to Doliana appears in a Venetian census of 1700, which recorded the settlement as having 58 families and approximately 160 inhabitants. The census also mentioned two churches, dedicated to the Dormition of the Theotokos and Saint John.

The settlement is also mentioned in historical accounts of military movements in the Peloponnese during the late 18th century. In 1790, a school in Doliana was recorded, indicating the existence of an organised educational institution before the Greek War of Independence.

=== Ancient quarries ===
Ancient marble quarries are located northwest of the community, dating back to the archaic-classical era. The homonymous Doliana marble was and is still being extracted here. It is white in color, with a tone of light blue or blue. It is one of the highest quality marbles in the Peloponnese, showing similarities with the Pentelic marble of Attica, although it does not reach the qualitative characteristics of the latter. It was most primarily used as a building block in antiquity and rarer in sculpture.

Among others, it has been used in the following cases:

- Temple of Artemis Knakeatis
- Temple of Athena Alea.
- Villa of Herodes Atticus.
- Ancient Olympia, mainly for sculpture.
- Epidaurus.
- Mantineia Base.

=== Greek revolution ===
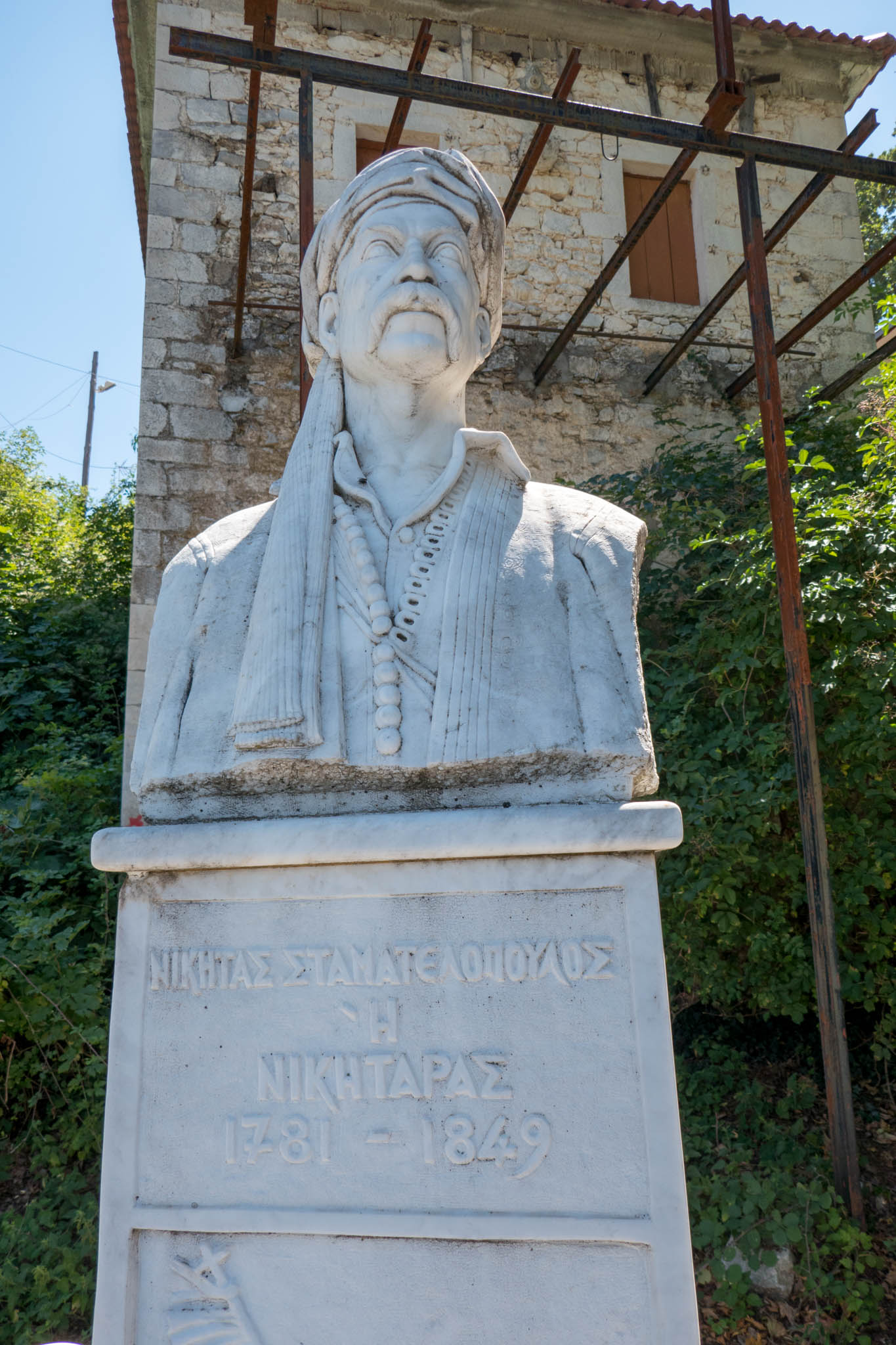
Bust of Nikitaras at the "Tsakonas" ravine, which was the main operations theater of the Battle of Doliana.

During the Greek War of Independence, a battle against the Turks took place in the village on 18 May 1821, known as the Battle of Doliana which was victorious for the Greeks.

In this battle, Nikitaras with 300 men, managed to repel 4.000 Turks that attacked the village with artillery. It was on this day that he took on the nickname "Turkophagos" which later accompanied him, because according to tradition many of the opponents died of his hands. At the entrance of Doliana and specifically at the point where the main battle unfolded, named "Tsakonas ravine", an honorable bust of Nikitaras has been erected.

During the later stages of the Revolution in July 1825, the troops of Ibrahim Pasha invaded the area. The local Greek forces put up resistance in what is known as the Second Battle of Doliana. Following the battle, Ibrahim's forces set fire to and destroyed a large portion of the settlement.

In the post-revolutionary period (around 1826–1830), one of the earliest Lancastrian (mutual-teaching) schools in the region was established in Doliana to provide elementary education to the local children.

== Information ==
Traditionally, the main repatriation of the inhabitants of Kato Doliana, as well as internal migrants and expatriates, takes place the week of the feast of Virgin Mary. Especially on the eve and on the day of 14 and 15 August, the concentration of Dolianites (as they call themselves) in the settlement is peaking. During this time folk festivals and other events take place, such as a traditional feast on the central square, movie screenings, as well as Youth Festivals at the chapel of Saint John located on a slope that faces the village.

Ancient marble quarries can be found in the vicinity of the community, producing the homonymous "Doliana marble", which was used -among others- in the construction of the Temple of Apollo Epicurius of Bassae, the Temple of Athena Alea in Tegea and possibly the Mantineia Base.

The mountain top of Saint Elias, a name often given to mountain tops in Greece, rises above the village. Here, on 20 July, residents gather in the homonymous chapel, at an altitude of 1.280 meters and perform a liturgy. Due to its high altitude of 1.390 meters, it is also being used as a telecommunications hub for the wider region, with antennas transmitting signals for OTE, television, radio and mobile telephony. It is accessible by a 4 km long road that starts from Doliana.

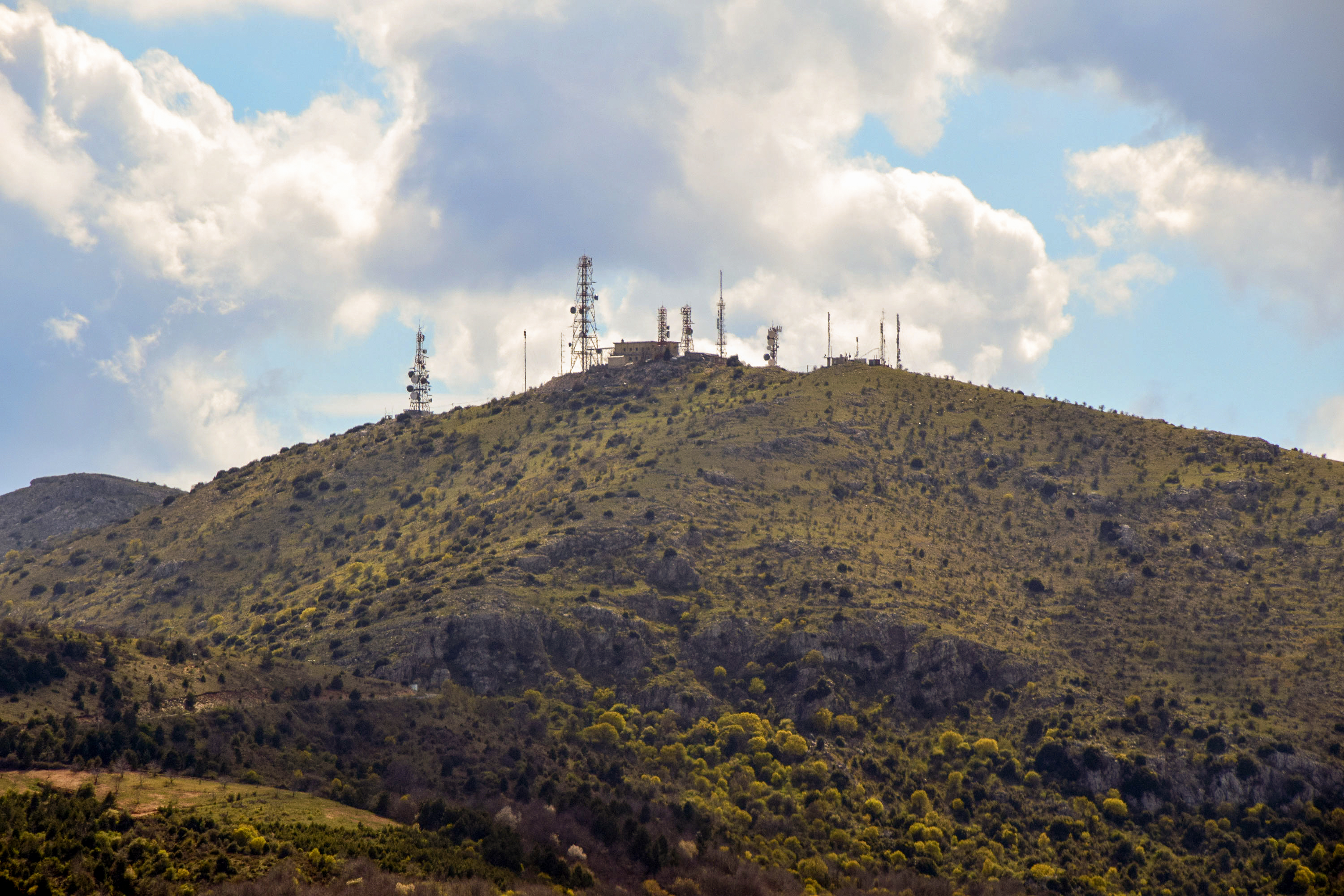
The mountaintop above Doliana reaches almost 1.400 meters and is being used by telecommunications providers

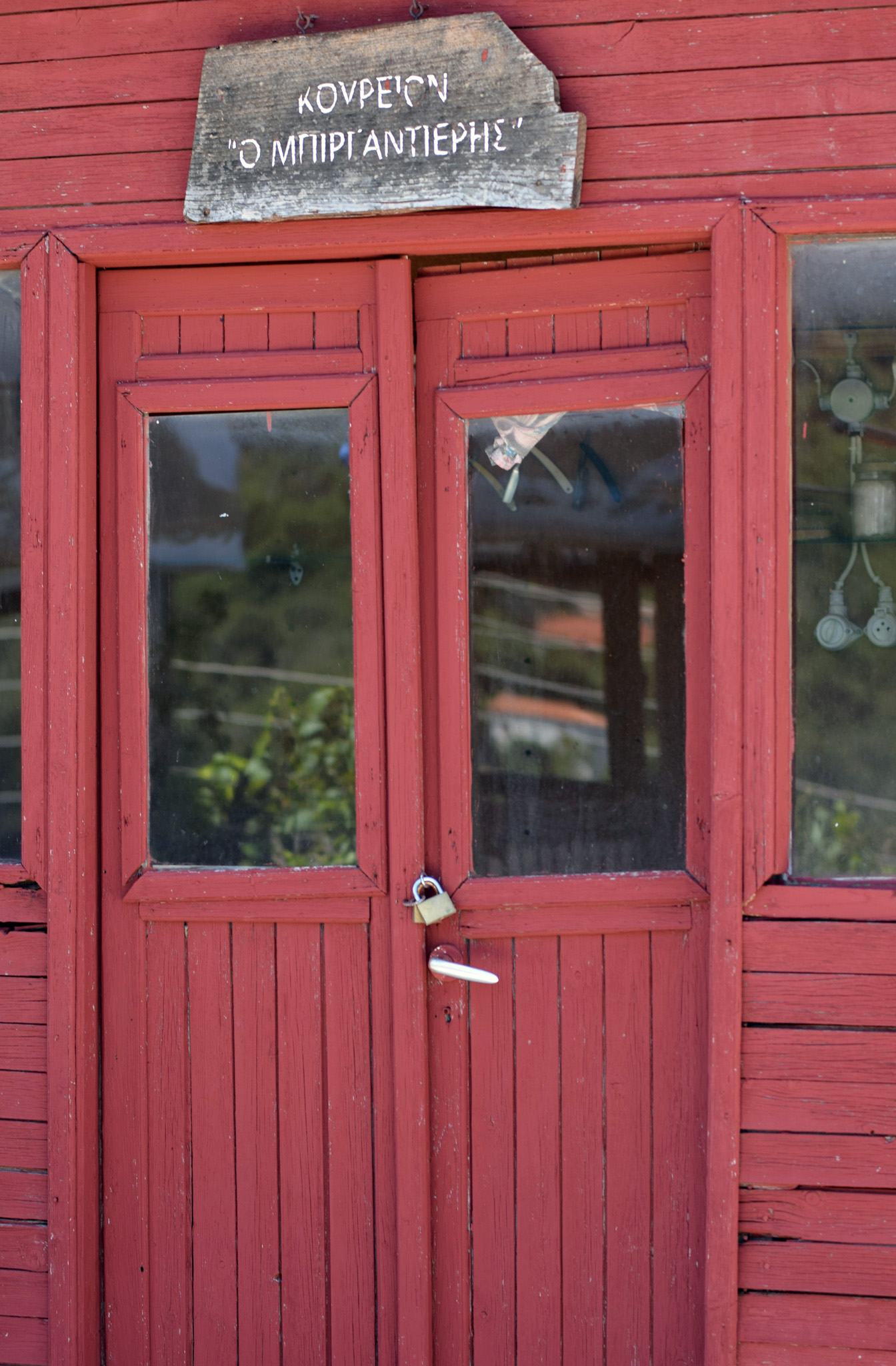
Traditional barber shop on the main street

== Etymology ==
Several theories have been proposed regarding the origin of the name Doliana. One interpretation, supported by linguist Max Vasmer, suggests a Slavic origin, deriving the name from dol (valley or depression) and Doljane (inhabitants of a valley). This interpretation relates the name to the mountainous geographical setting of the settlement.

Other accounts suggest a historical connection with Doliana in Epirus, proposing that settlers migrated from that region to Arcadia during the late 17th century. A further tradition, attributed to historian Nikos Veis, also connects the village's foundation with migration from Epirus. The precise origin of the name remains uncertain.

== Demographic evolution ==
Demographic evolution of Ano Doliana
Year	Population
1834	893
1861	1,336
1870	1,323
1879	1.682
1889	1.577
1896	1,649
1907	1,627
1920	1,849
1928	1,796
1940	1,594
1951	66
1961	12
1971	6
1981	19
1991	69
2001	80
2011	90
2021	62

== Sights ==
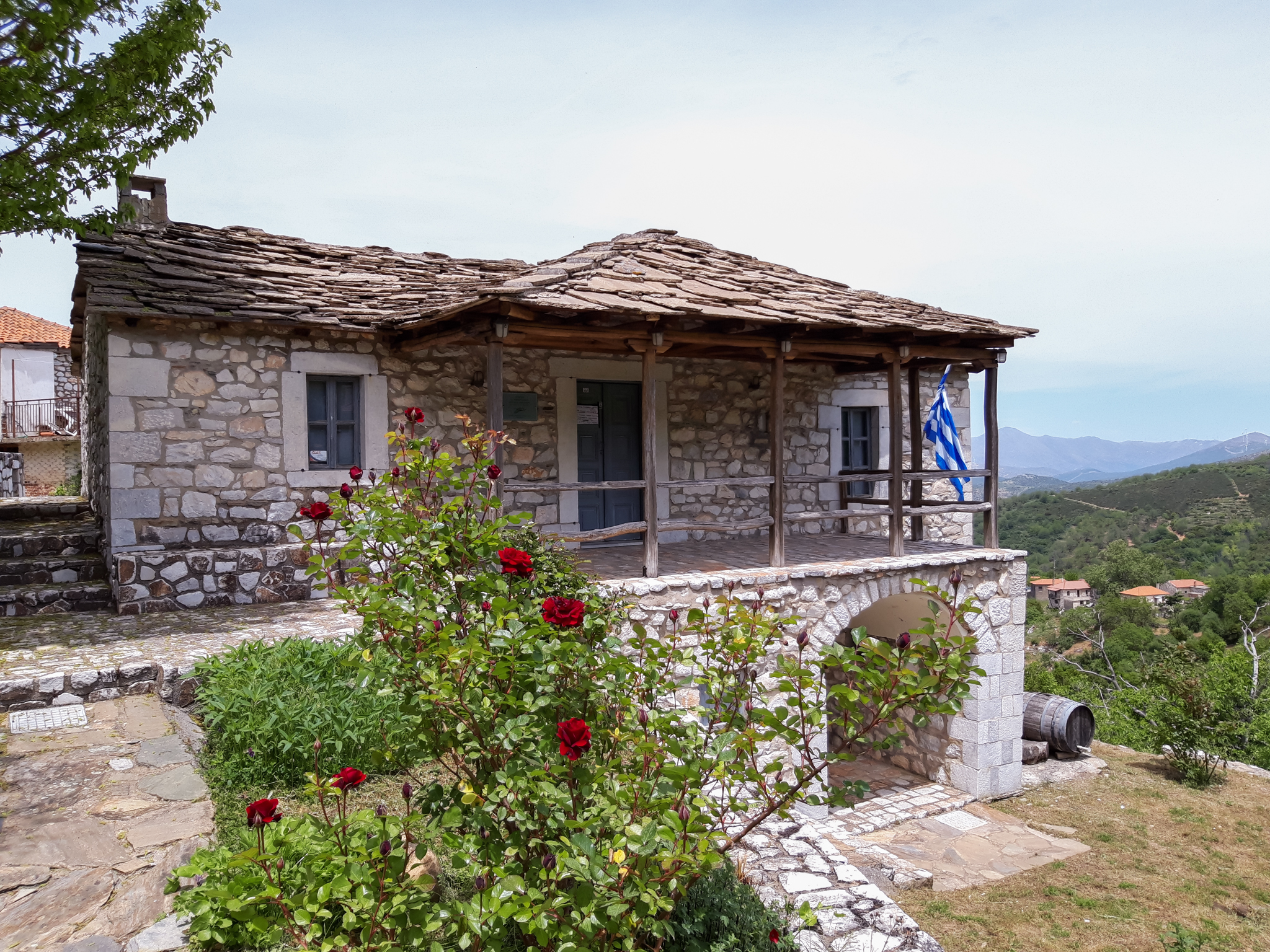
The "Historical and Ethnographical Museum" of Doliana

On 23 May 2015, the "Historical and Ethnographical Museum of Doliana" was inaugurated, dedicated to the historic battle that took place in the village, but also to the wider folklore of everyday life in the area. It is located in Christofili's house, which was the house where Nikitaras and his klephts fort upped during the battle, thus it was named "To tampouri tou Nikitara" (i.e. "The bulwark of Nikitaras"). It is open to the public every Saturday and Sunday morning and is admission free.

The old elementary school is of particular interest, as it has been declared a traditional building by the Ministry of Environment and Physical Planning and today operates as a traditional guesthouse. As a school, it used to operate during September and October of each school year, until the farmers would complete the harvest of chestnuts and other crops and move to the lowland settlement. It ceased its operation in October 1982.

=== Churches and chapels ===
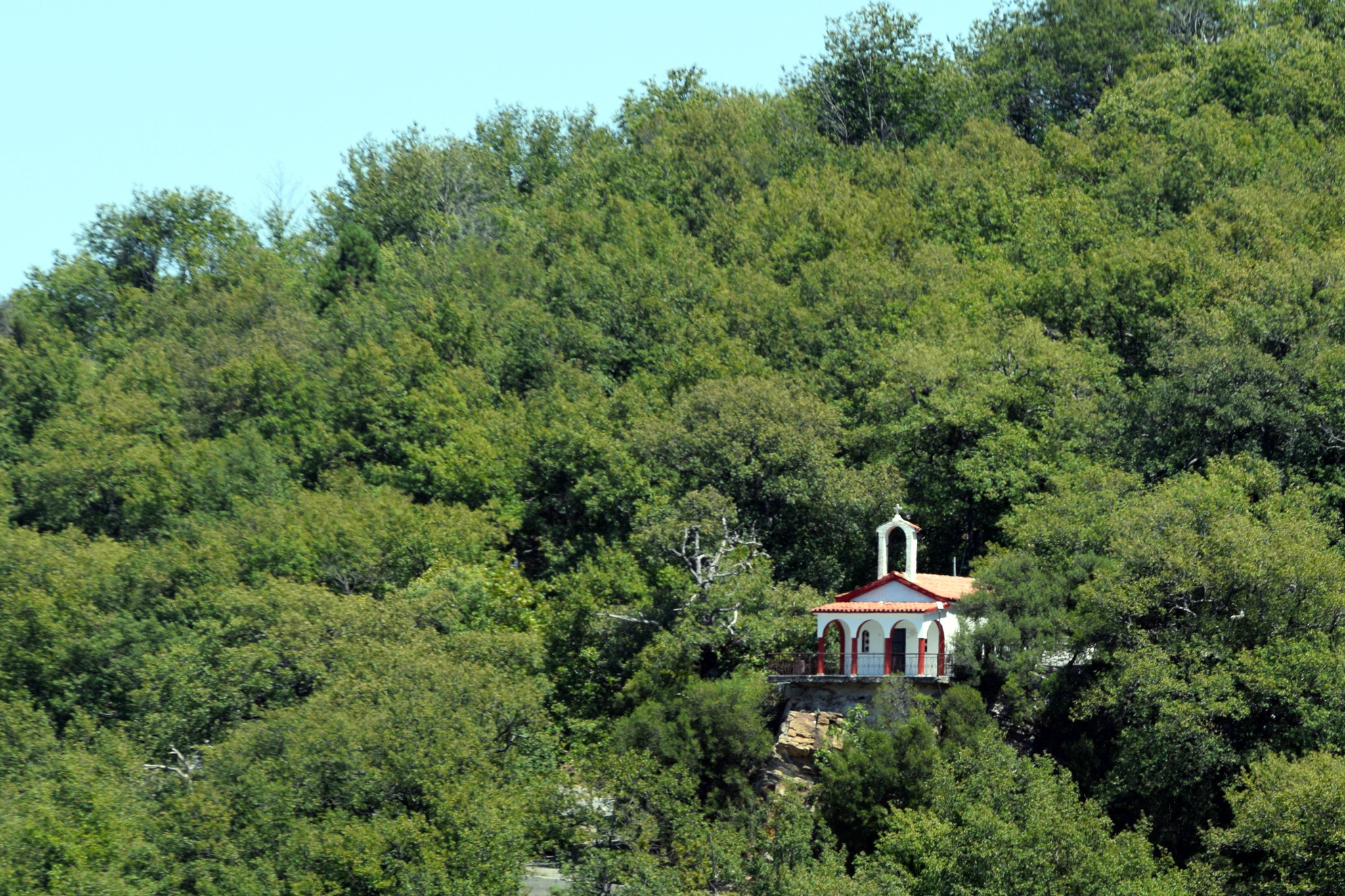
Saint John's chapel overlooks the village

The settlement is home to two main historical churches, as well as several notable chapels located in and around the village:

- Church of Panagia (Dormition of the Virgin Mary): Built in 1810 using local marble. Its original wooden interior was destroyed by fire during the Greek War of Independence. It was reconstructed in the 1970s into its current form as a domed basilica.
- Church of Agios Georgios (Saint George): A pre-revolutionary basilica that served as the headquarters of Kechagiabey during the historic Battle of Doliana in 1821, according to historical accounts by Fotakos.
- Chapel of Agios Ioannis (Saint John): Situated about 1.5 km from the village center on a slope overlooking Ano Doliana. On May 16, 1821, Nikitaras and his fighters encamped here prior to the Battle of Doliana.
- Chapel of Profitis Ilias (Prophet Elias): Located above the village at an altitude of 1,300 meters, near the mountain peak (1,390 m). A celebratory liturgy takes place here every year on July 20.
- Chapel of Agia Paraskevi: Located at the lower entrance of the village, built through local fundraising initiated by Eleni I. Tsiamoulou.

== Events ==
On the first Saturday of November, when the chestnut harvest from the trees that abound in the surrounding area is completed, the community organizes the so-called "Yorti Kastanou" (i.e. "Chestnut Feast") where visitors have the opportunity to enjoy chestnut in many different recipes for food, sweets and liqueurs.

On 23 April, along with the return of part of the settlers for the warm days of the year, the icon of the patron saint of the village, Agios Georgios, is transferred here from the village of Kato Doliana by bus. On the first Sunday of November the icon returns to the lowland settlement. During the descent, the residents hand-carry the icon on a ritual hike that lasts several hours and passes through the old path that used to connect the two settlements before motorways were created.

In the past, the local Cultural Association organized the so-called "Representation of the Battle of Doliana". It took place every four years in honor of the Greek revolution fighters and was attended by almost all residents of the village. The custom has diminished over the years, taking place for the last time in 2003. Nowadays it is limited to a simple ritual event of remembrance. The representation of the battle is expected to revive in 2021, on its 200 years anniversary.

== Sports ==
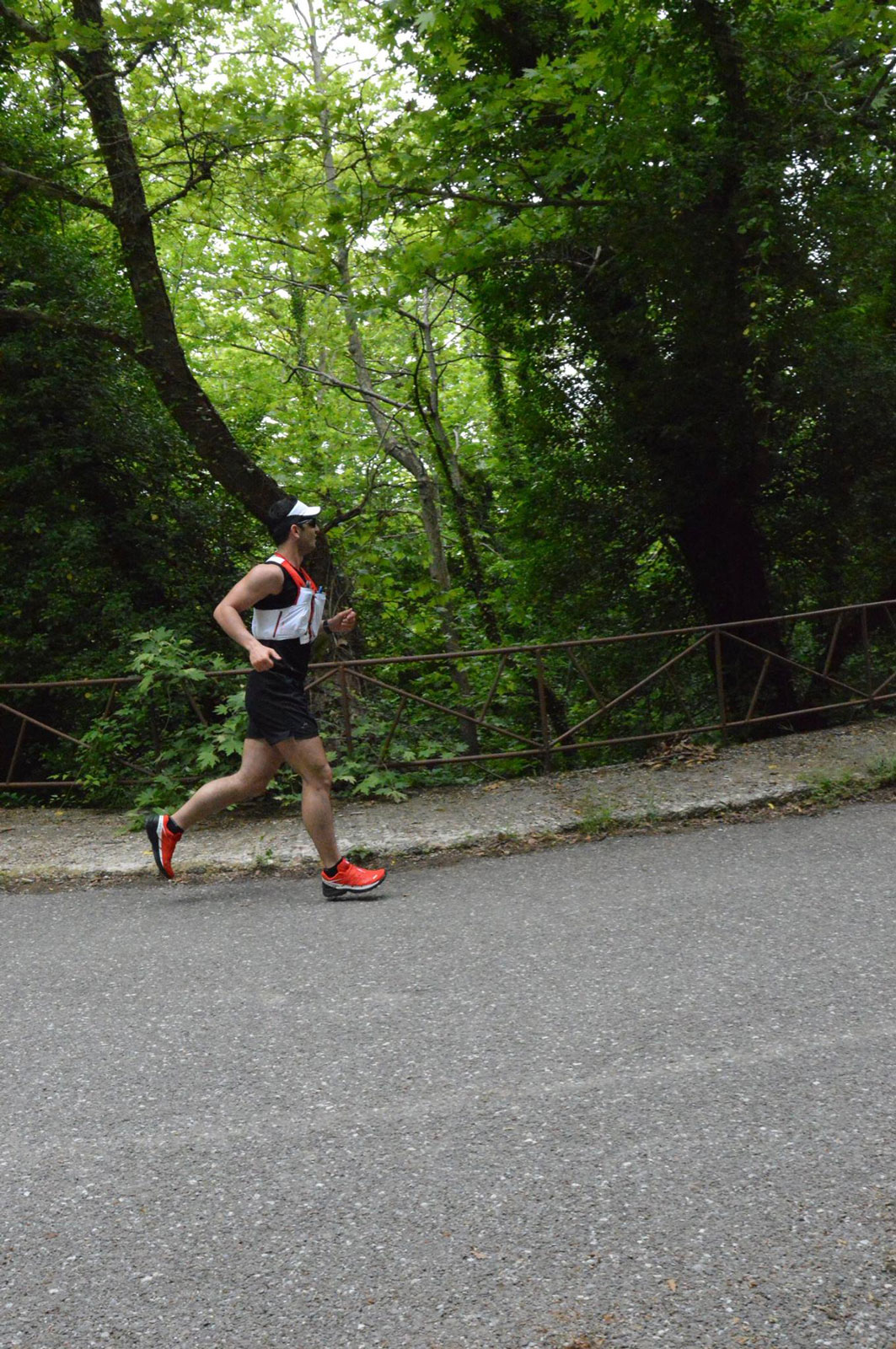
Snapshot from Doliana's mountain half-marathon

Since 2015, an annual mountain half marathon takes place, usually between late May to mid-June, alongside a 5 km race for less experienced runners and a 1000m race for children. It is an event that has been upgraded since 2017 and is under the auspices of SEGAS, Greece's governing body for amateur sports.

The village is represented in local regional competitions by the athletic club Nikitaras Dolianon (Greek: Νικηταράς Δολιανών), named after the revolutionary hero Nikitaras who fought in the historic 1821 Battle of Doliana. Sports facilities in the settlement include a natural grass football pitch, which is also used by external football clubs for summer pre-season training, as well as an open basketball court.

The cobbled streets and paths of the settlement regularly host the local downhill cycling championship, on a route that has been named "Doli Stone Stairs" by the organizers.

== Activities ==
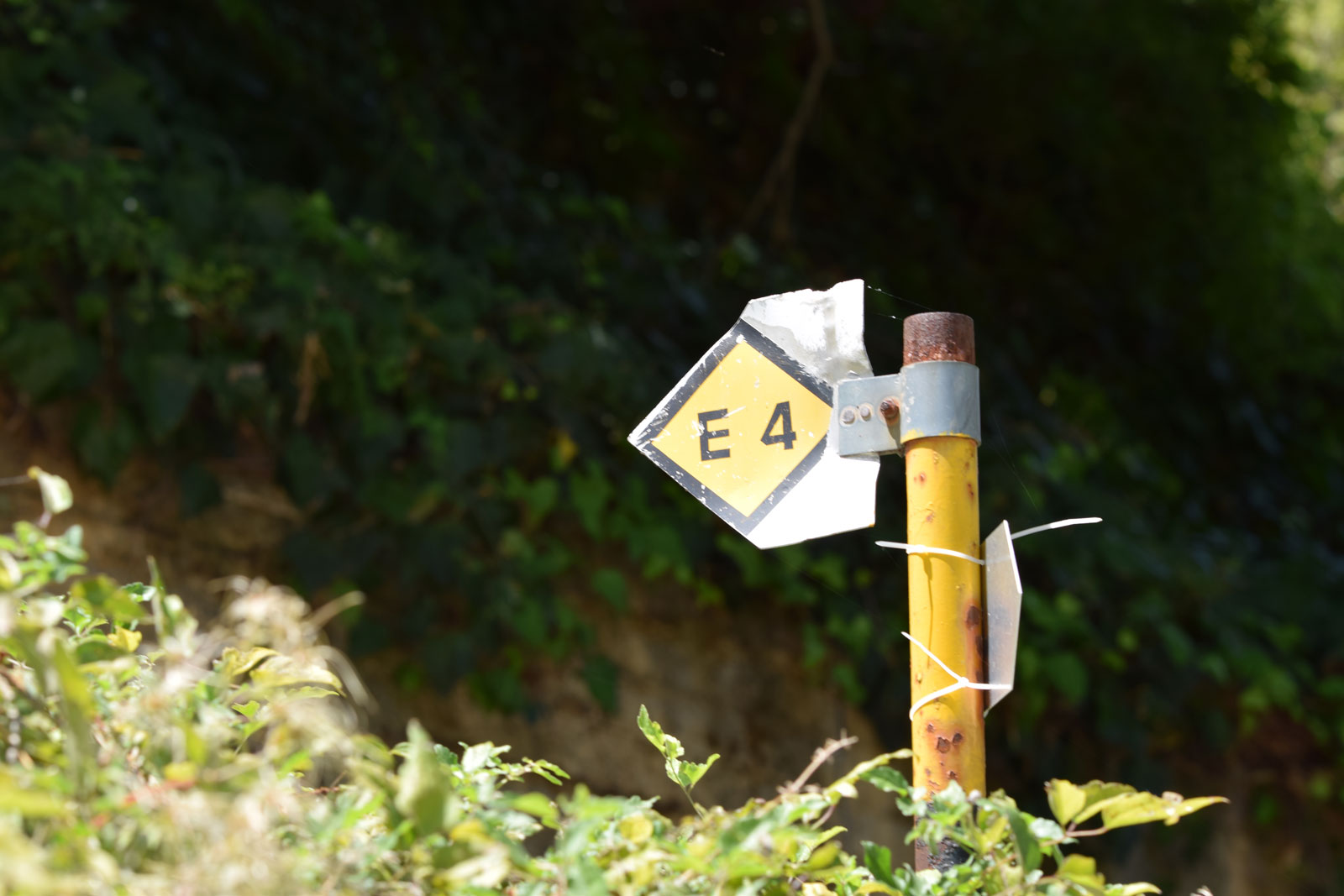
E4 European path sign in Ano Doliana

The E4 European long distance path crosses right through Doliana, making it an adequate destination for hikers.

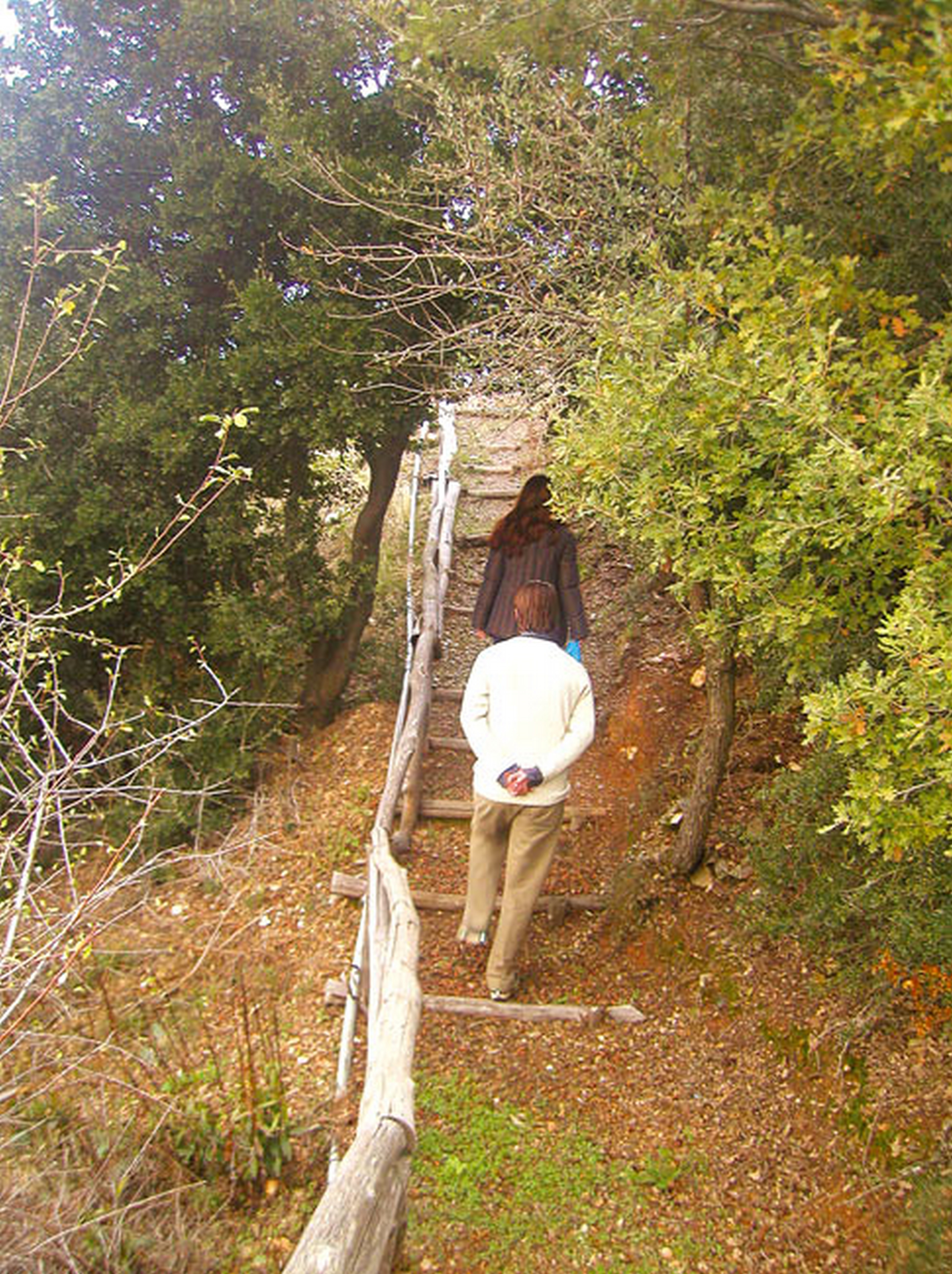
Hiking on the part of E4 that crosses the village

Lying at the northernmost edge of mount Parnon, Doliana also serve as a starting point for Parnon Trail, a trekking path 200 kilometres long that is based on old paths of the region and is currently under revival works by local volunteer groups. It crosses the whole Parnon range throughout the wider area of Cynuria, combining the mountain and the sea along its path.

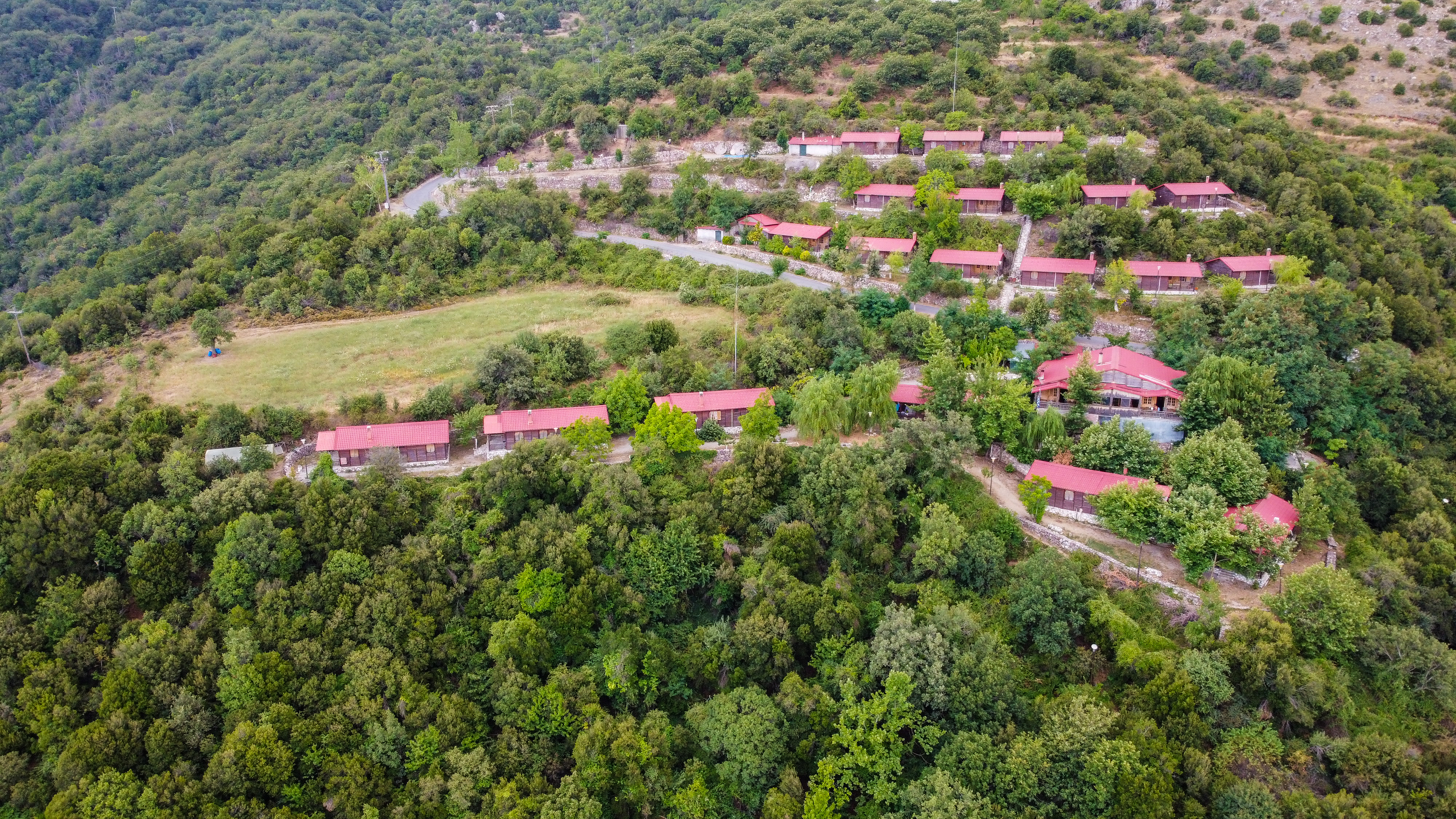
The forest village of Ano Doliana

At an altitude of 1,100 meters and on the highest edge of the village, an artificial environmental settlement has been built by the local forestry authority with funding from the Ministry of Agricultural Development. It is known as dasiko horio (literally translating to forest village) by the locals. Its construction was part of the Ministry's broader effort to create infrastructure in remote mountainous forest regions of Greece, to facilitate short-term visitor stay in relative comfort close to the forest, for recreational and educational purposes. It consists of 20 wooden residences that are spread on an area of 29 acres and can accommodate up to 80 guests.
A chalet, perched at an altitude of 1,090 meters, is the epicenter of Dasiko Horio, offering panoramic views of the Tripoli plateau and the surrounding region. A small theatre, built out of stone in 2000, is also located near the premises.

== People ==
- James Pantemis, Canadian professional goalkeeper of Greek descent, on his grandmother's side.
- Angelos Terzakis, prominent writer of the "Generation of the '30s", on his mother's side.

== See also ==
- Battle of Doliana
- Kato Doliana, the lowland residency of the settlers
- Parnon
- Forest villages (Greece)
- List of traditional settlements of Greece
- List of settlements in Arcadia
