= Ioannis Papaioannou (disambiguation) =

Ioannis Papaioannou (Greek: Ιωάννης Παπαϊωάννου; born 1976) is a Greek chess grandmaster.

Ioannis Papaioannou may also refer to:

- Giannis Papaioannou (1913–1972), Greek rembetiko composer
- Ioannis Papaioannou (actor) (1869–1931), Greek comic actor of musical theater and Greek troupe leader of operetta
- Yiannis Papaioannou (1910–1989), Greek composer and teacher of the Modern Era
