= Mantineia Base =

Three ancient Greek bas relief plaques

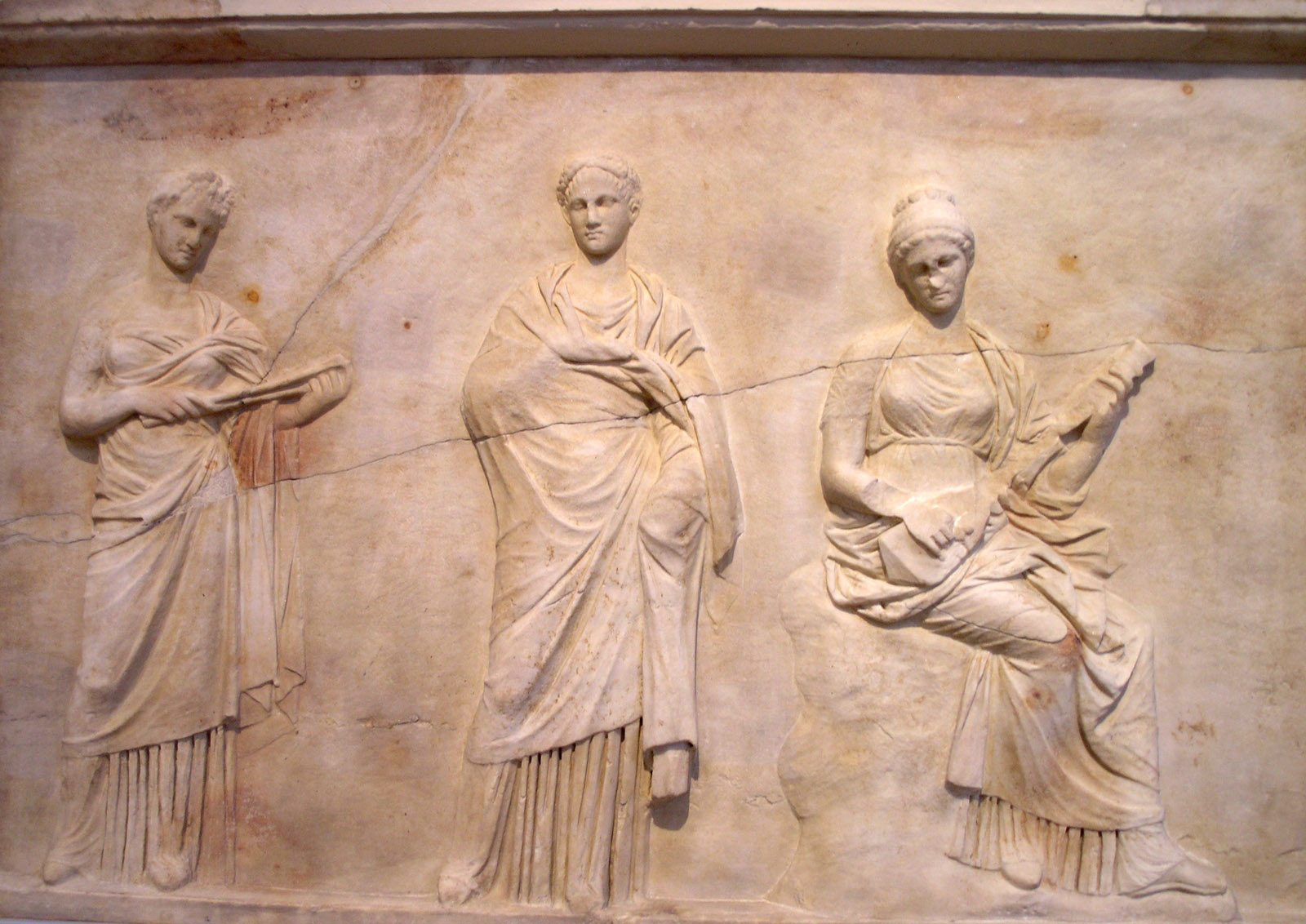
Three muses (NAMA 216)

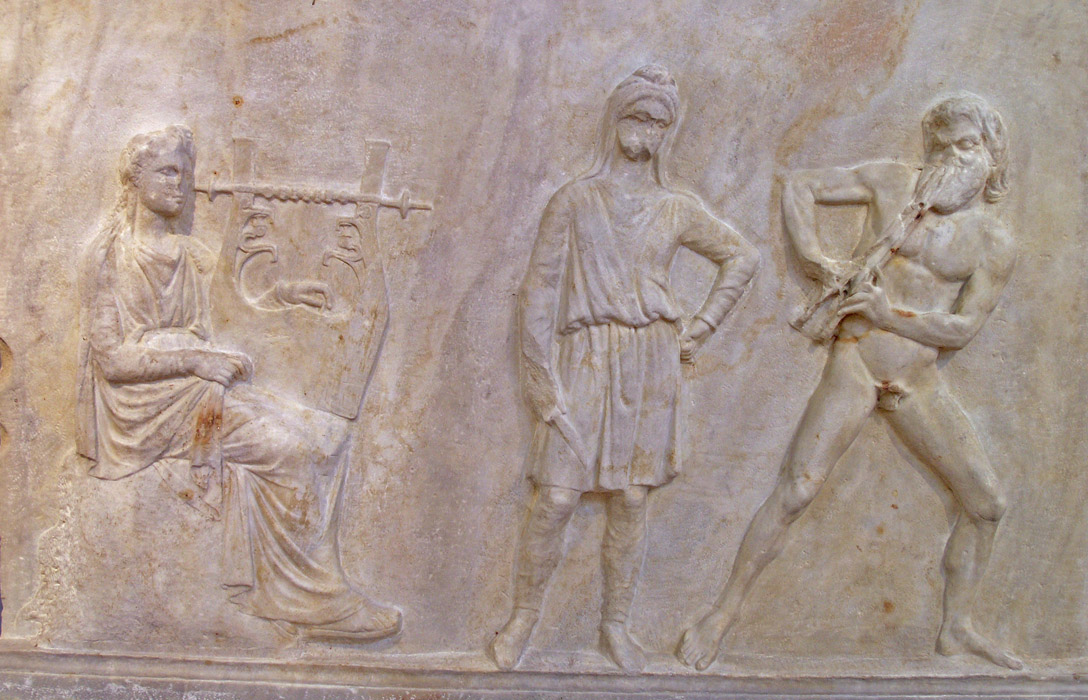
From left to right; Apollo, a servant in Scythian dress, and Marsyas (NAMA 215)

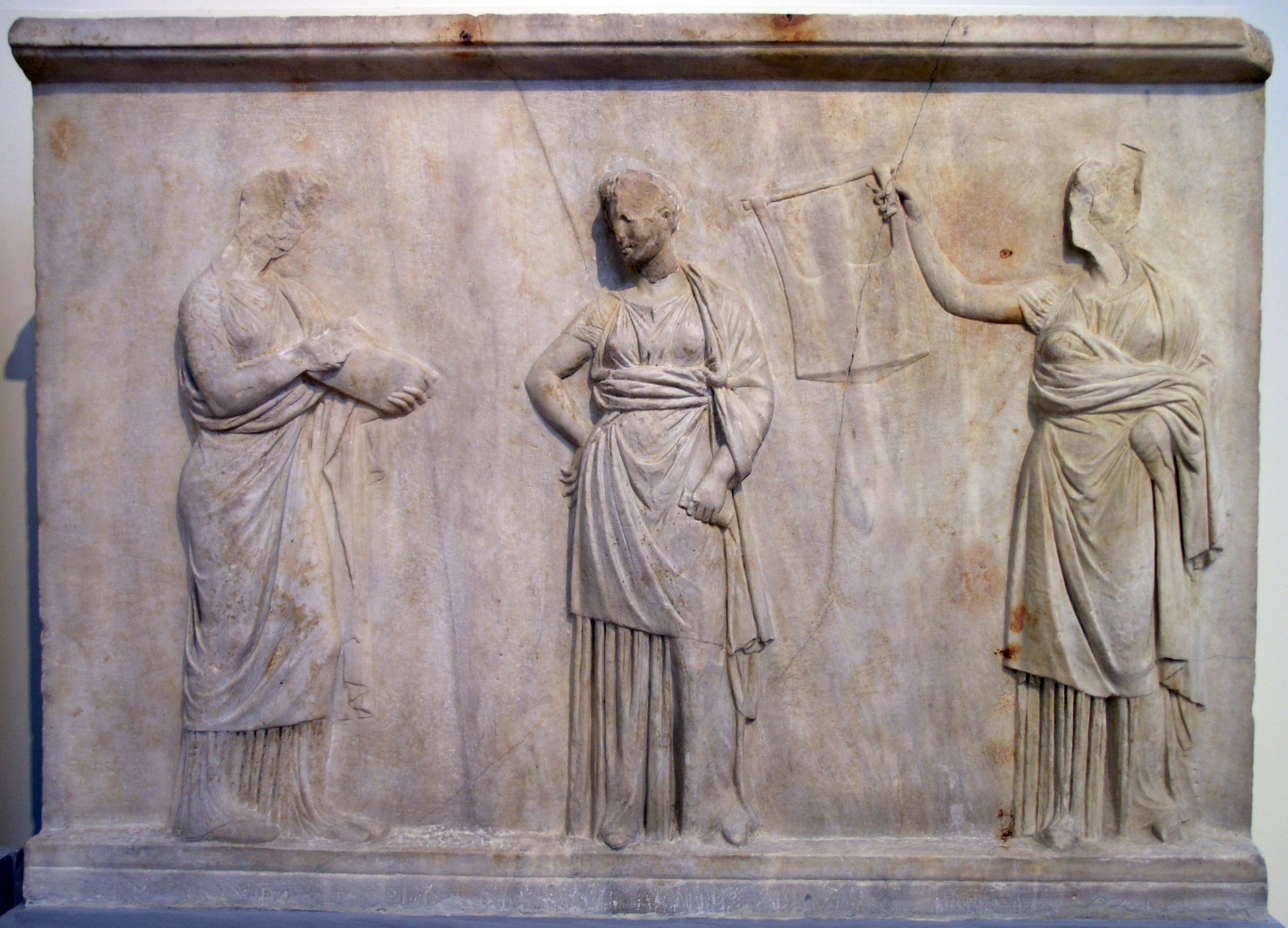
Three muses (NAMA 217)

The Mantineia Base is an ensemble of three ancient Greek bas relief plaques, one of which depicts Apollo, Marsyas, and a slave, and the other two of which each show a group of three Muses. They were discovered in 1887 on the site of the ancient Greek city of Mantineia in Arcadia and were probably decoration for a statue base. They have been attributed to the sculptor Praxiteles or another member of his workshop. They are currently kept in the National Archaeological Museum of Athens, where their inventory numbers are NAMA 215–217.

== Description ==
On 11 August 1887 in the course of excavations at Mantineia by the French School at Athens, the archaeologist Gustave Fougères discovered the three plaques, which had been reused in the floor of a Byzantine church. The upper part had been heavily worn by the passage of the parishioners, but the side facing downwards still bore sculpted decoration in a good state. The plaques were immediately transferred to the National Archaeological Museum of Athens, where they were restored.

They are made of white marble, which was once identified as the marble of Doliana, near Tegea, but is now recognised to be Pentelic marble. The three plaques have very similar dimensions: NAMA 216 is 1.35 m wide and 0.96 m high; NAMA 215 and 217 are 1.36 m by 0.96 m and 0.98 m respectively. Their depth varies from 8 to 12 cm. They are decorated in the same way: on the upper part, an Echinus moulding above a broad flat band, on the lower edge there is a concave moulding and another broad flat band. Each panel has three attachment holes in the same locations. These aspects indicate that they were all made together.

Each plaque depicts three figures on a blank background. They are juxtaposed simply, without any complicated compositional features.

=== Apollo and Marsyas (NAMA 216) ===
At left, the god Apollo is represented seated, with long hair, wearing a chiton and himation, and holding a kithara in his left hand which rests on his left knee. With his right hand he grabs a fold in his himation. At right, Marsyas is shown with a beard, his left leg bent, playing the aulos (double flute). In the centre a bearded man is standing, wearing a kind of Phrygian cap, a chiton, and anaxyrides (trousers), holding a knife in one hand. Based on the identifications of the other two figures, he must be the servant who flays Marsyas after he loses his musical contest against Apollo.

=== Muses (NAMA 215 and 217) ===
The other two plaques represent the Muses, who, in some versions of the myth of Marsyas, were the judges of the contest. The Muses are differentiated. On NAMA 215, the one on the left holds an aulos, the one in the centre holds the folds of her himation, and the one on the right is seated and plays a little string instrument – perhaps a bandora. On NAMA 217, the left Muse holds some unrolled parchment, the central Muse holds a rolled-up scroll in her left hand, and the right Muse holds up a kithara in her right hand. Canonically, there were nine Muses, so presumably there was a fourth plaque depicting the missing three Muses.

== Attribution ==
When he published the discovery, Fougères suggested that the three plaques decorated the sides of a rectangular pedestal and suggested that they be associated with a passage of Pausanias who mentions in his description of Mantineia, "a sanctuary of Leto and her children; it was Praxiteles who made the statues, two generations after Alcamenes; on their base there are carvings of a Muse and a Marsyas playing the aulos."

This text which has been transmitted mentions only a single Muse and presents a difficulty in that while representations of Marsyas playing the flute with a single Maenad are common, there are no known representations of Marsyas playing the flute with a single Muse. To resolve the problem, it has been suggested that Pausanias, whose descriptions are often very vague, was confused and has mistaken Apollo for a Muse. Fougères proposed to emend Μοῦσα (Muse) to Μοῦσαι (Muses), a correction which has been widely accepted since.

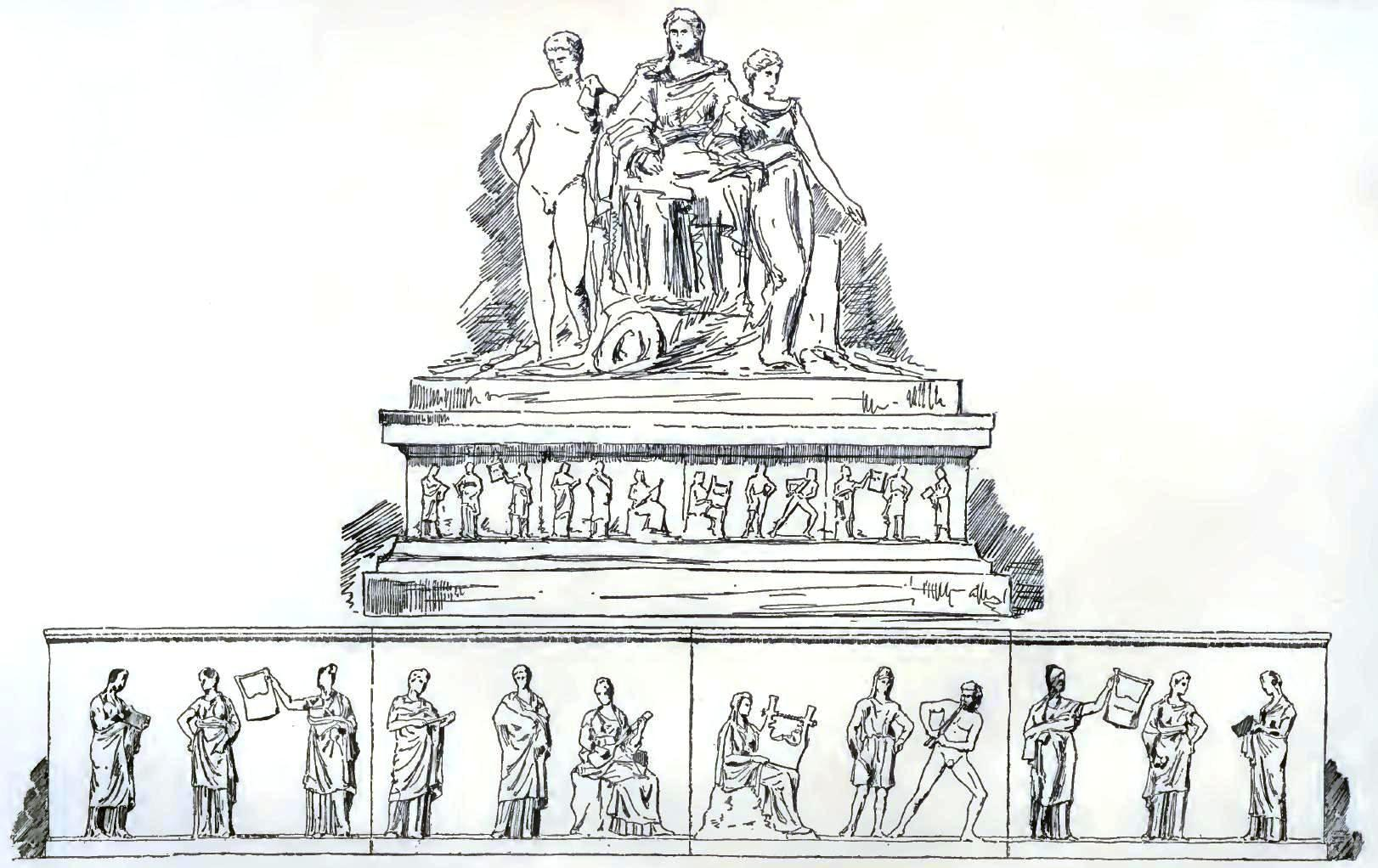
Hypothetical reconstruction of the plaques in order to force them to match Pausanias' description.

The main objection to this hypothesis concerns the proposed arrangement of the base, with the plaque of Apollo and Marsyas on the front, the plaques of the Muses on the sides. This would create a base measuring 1.36 x 1.36 metres, which would be too small for the three statues that Pausanias mentions. The three plaques could instead be arranged next to one another, with Apollo and Marsyas in the centre and the Muses on either side, but there are no traces of attachments for connecting the plaques on their sides, which argues against this hypothesis. It has been proposed to see the plaques as the decoration for a platform for the competitors of a musical contest which took place every year in Arcadia according to Polybius. Indeed, one of the heads of the Muses of NAMA 217 was recovered from the ruins of the theatre. However, this reconstruction is not supported by any archaeological evidence.

== Bibliography ==
- Aileen Ajootian, "Praxiteles," Personal Styles in Greek Sculpture (edited by Olga Palagia and J. J. Pollitt), Cambridge University Press, 1998 (1st edition 1996) ISBN 0-521-65738-5, p. 122–124.
- Walther Amelung, Die Basis des Praxiteles aus Mantineia, Munich, 1895.
- Gustave Fougères, "Bas-reliefs de Mantinée. Apollon et les Muses," Bulletin de correspondance hellénique 12 (1888) p. 105–128, pl. I, II et III.
- Inge Linfert-Reich, Musen und dichterinnen Figuren des vierten und frühen dritten Jahrshunderts, Cologne, 1971, p. 32–42.
- Alain Pasquier, "Praxitèle aujourd'hui ? La question des originaux," in Praxitèle, catalogue de l'exposition au musée du Louvre, 23 mars-18 juin 2007, éditions du Louvre & Somogy, 2007 ISBN 978-2-35031-111-1, p. 92–93 and no.16, p. 110–111.
- Brunilde Sismondo Ridgway :
  - Fourth-Century Styles in Greek Sculpture, University of Wisconsin Press, Madison, 1997 ISBN 0-299-15470-X, p. 206–209,
  - Hellenistic Sculpture I. The Styles of ca. 331-200 B.C., University of Wisconsin Press, Madison, 2001 ISBN 0-299-11824-X, p. 253–254.
- Claude Rolley, La Sculpture grecque, vol. II : La période classique, Manuels d'art et d'archéologie antiques, Picard, 1999, p. 252–253.
- Charles Waldstein, "The Mantineian Reliefs," American Journal of Archæology (1891), vol. 7, no.1-2, p. 1–18.
