= Battle of Doliana =

Battle that occurred during the Greek War of Independence

- Part of the Greek War of Independence
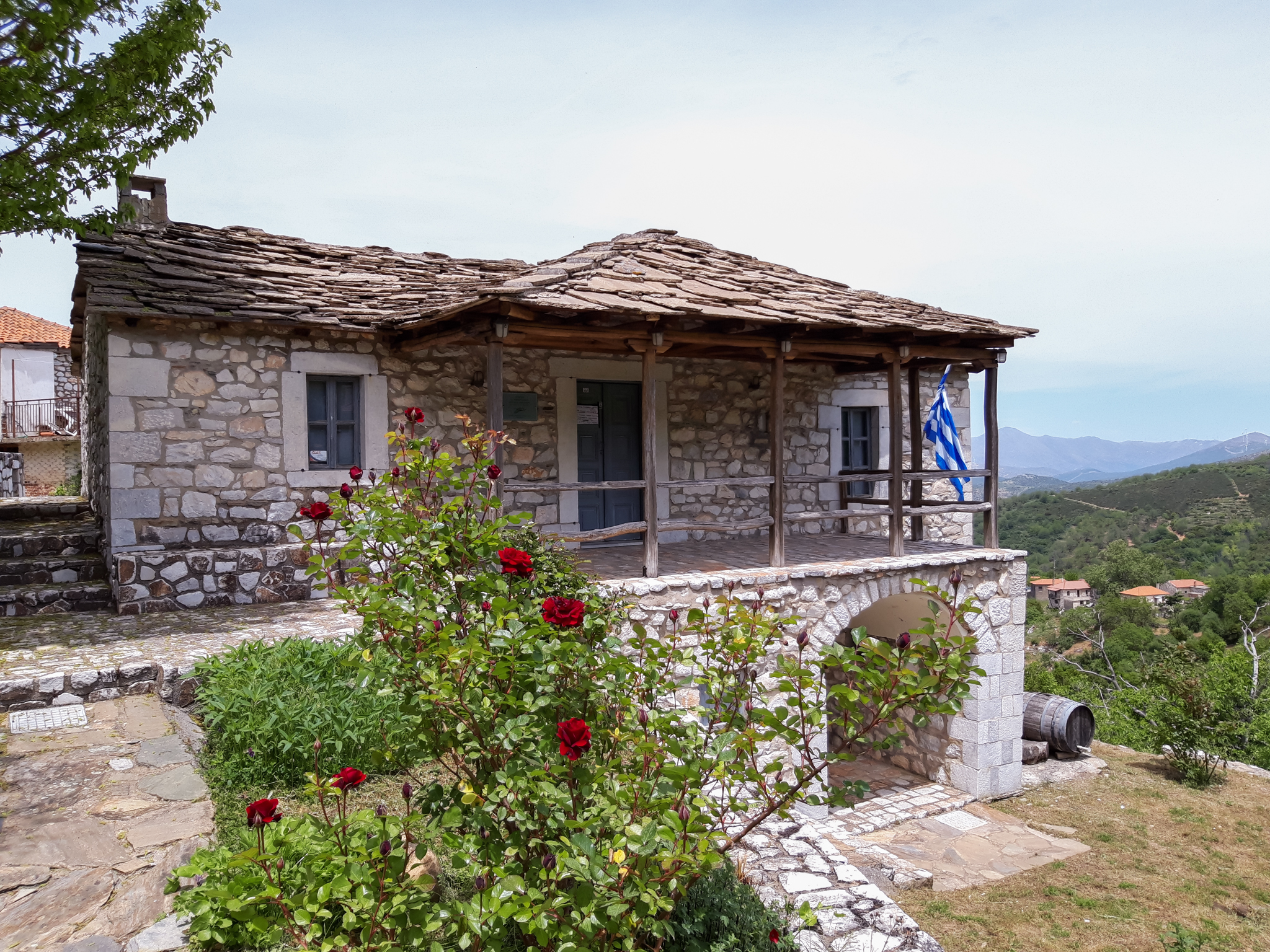
- The house which Nikitaras utilized as a fortification; nowadays transformed into a museum.
Date	30 May 1821 (18 May Julian)
Location	Doliana, Morea Eyalet, Ottoman Empire (now Arcadia, Greece) 37.387643°N 22.498677°E
Result	Greek victory

Belligerents
Greek revolutionaries	Ottoman Empire

Commanders and leaders
Nikitaras; Georgakis Digenis †	Kâhya Mustafa Bey; Mehmed Salih Agha; Sieh Necip

Strength
2,500–3,000	6,000; 2 cannons

Casualties and losses
Unknown	Unknown
- Doliana on the Peloponnese

The Battle of Doliana occurred on 30 May 1821 N.S. during the Greek War of Independence when Greek revolutionaries defeated the forces of the Ottoman Empire at Doliana (today called Ano (upper) Doliana to distinguish from nearby Kato (lower) Doliana) in the Morea province of the Ottoman Empire.

== Battle ==
After the Turkish defeat at the battle of Valtetsi, the Turkish leader Kâhya Mustafa Bey decided to attack and destroy the Greek camp of Vervena where 2,500 armed Greeks had gathered. According to Spyridon Trikoupis, the Turks believed that the destruction of Vervena would seriously damage Greek morale.

During the night of 17–18 May, an Ottoman force of six thousand men and two cannons marched from Tripoli to Vervena. The Turkish plan would only have succeeded if the Ottoman army could have passed Doliana where Nikitaras, a Greek revolutionary leader, was positioned with approximately two hundred men. By the time the Ottomans reached Doliana, Nikitaras had established a fortified position utilizing local residences. When the Turks arrived they were surprised by the Greeks and combat ensued. Meanwhile at Vervena, when a portion of the Ottoman army arrived it was forced to quickly retreat because the Greek revolutionaries had realized the impending danger and prepared for an attack by taking positions to flank the Turks. Due to the number of casualties, Mustafa Bey and the Turks retreated. The Greeks followed the Turks as they withdrew and continued to pursue their fleeing enemy to Tripoli.

According to the Greek General Kolokotronis, the Ottomans lost seventy men and abandoned their cannons and materials on the battlefield. Nikitaras, who had up to that point lived in the shadow of General Kolokotronis, earned a reputation and nickname (Greek: Τουρκοφάγος, romanized: Tourkofagos, lit. 'Turk-eater'). A legend of the time reported that after the battle of Doliana, Nikitaras' sword got stuck to his hand and could not be removed.

== Significance ==
The victorious Battle of Doliana was a big morale boost for the Greek revolutionaries. It marked the last time that the besieged Ottoman army left Tripoli and opened the way for the fall of the city and the firm establishment of the independence movement in the Peloponnese.

== See also ==
- "Battle of Doliana". Phantis.
- Ano Doliana
