= Forest villages (Greece) =

Man-made villages found in remote mountainous areas of Greece

Forest villages (Greek: δασικά χωριά, sing. δασικό χωριό) are artificially created villages in remote mountainous regions of Greece established by law in 1995 (FEK 170/Β/14-3-1995) for tourism purposes. According to the law, they comprise a "grouping of simple living arrangements in remote forest regions, intended for visitors of mountains and forests who want to be able to stay in relative comfort near the wilderness".

== Differentiation ==
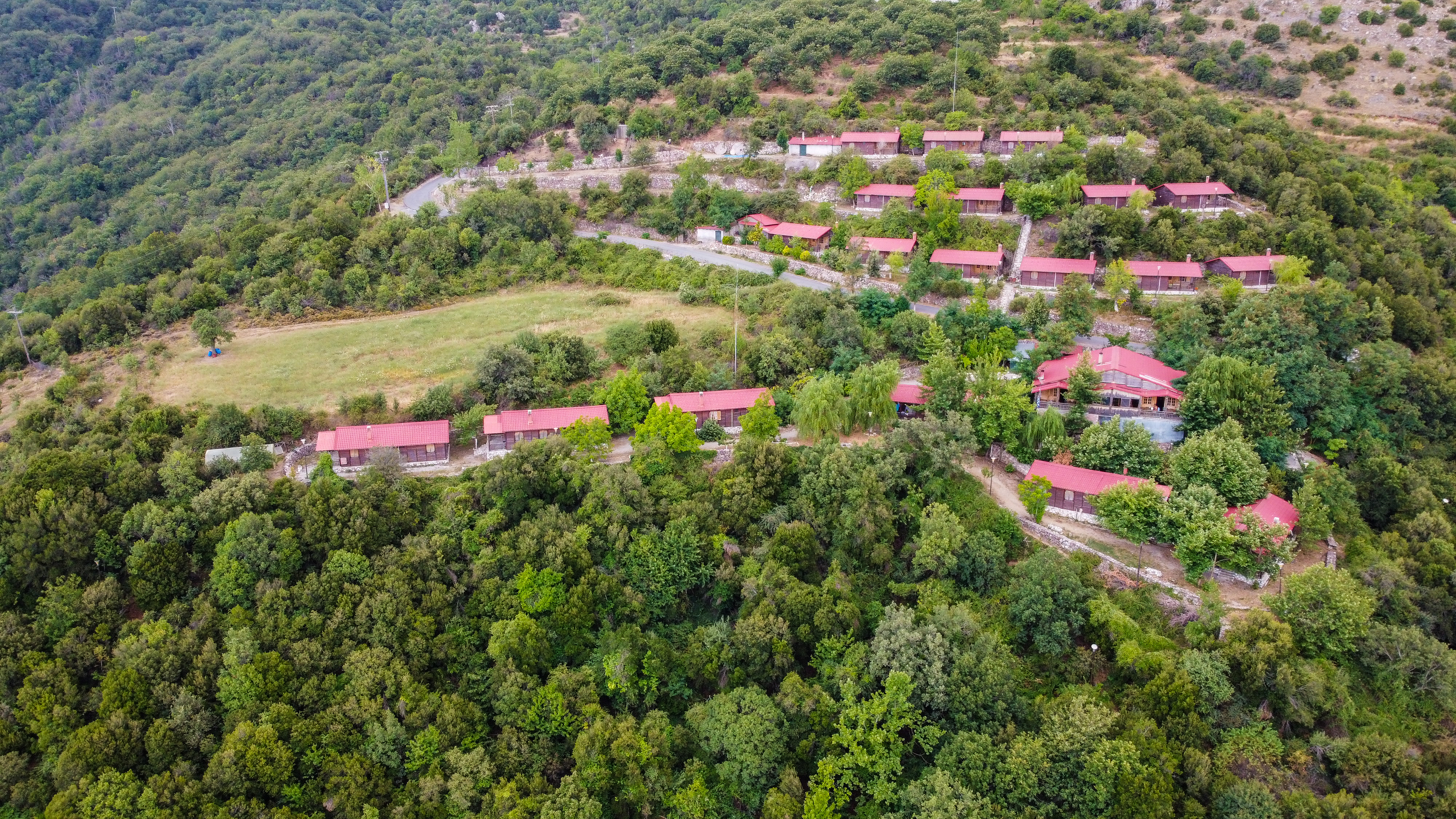
"Forest village" of Ano Doliana in Arcadia.

A "forest village" is not a mountain hut or mountain refuge. The original directive for their creation specified the number 20 as the target number of separate huts.

A "forest village" is also not a commercial hotel in the traditional sense. Though the term has been used commercially, thus confusing the issue.

== Legal status ==
Despite the fact that such mountain villages were created by ministerial decree, Law 2160/93 and with special environmental permits of article 2, Law 3010/02 there have been legal challenges, mainly concentrating on the fact that they are within national parks or designated wildlife areas. However the Greek ombudsman's decision set all such issues to rest. The level of resistance in certain areas however did lead to the cancellation of several of the originally planned locations.

== Locations ==
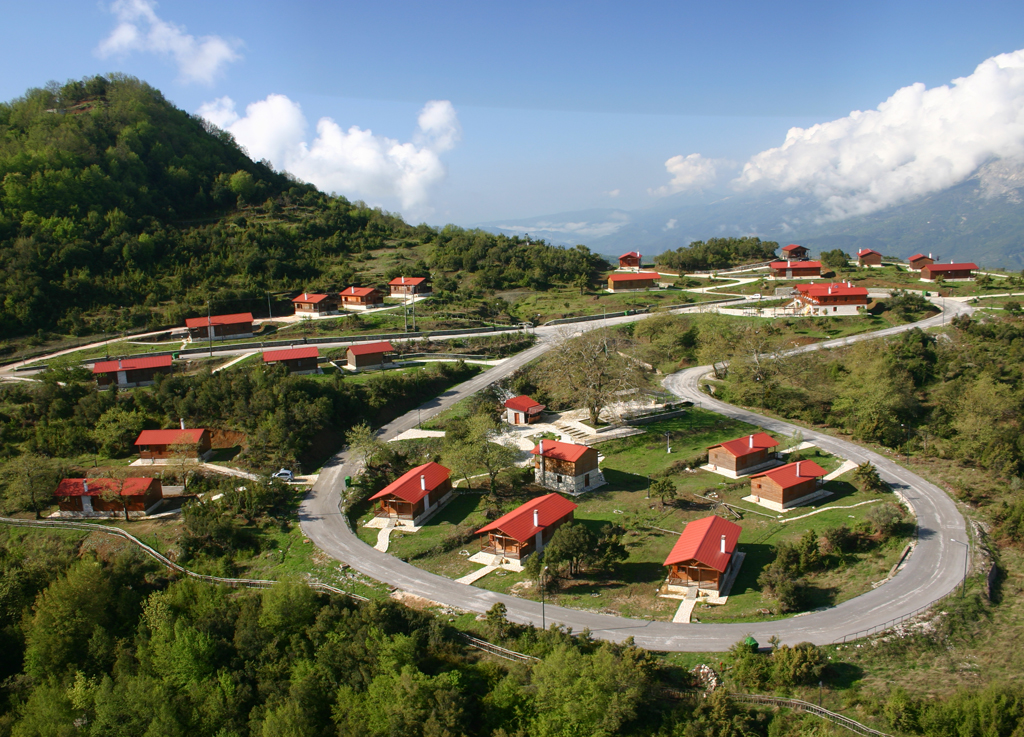
Example of a "forest village" at Tzoumerka

The actual locations of the mountain villages which made it through the process and stand as finished, working "forest villages" are six:

- Ano Doliana, Peloponnese
- Driades, Karditsa
- Kedros, Tzoumerka
- Pangaio, Kavala
- Papades, Euboea
- Rodopoli, Western Thrace
