= Philorthodox Society =

19th-century Greek secret society

- Formation: June 1839
- Purpose: Greek irredentism and the strengthening of Orthodox Christianity
- Fields: Hellenic nationalism Russophilia (diplomatic)
- Key people: Nikitas Stamatelopoulos; Georgios Kapodistrias

Philorthodox Society (Greek: Φιλορθόδοξος Εταιρεία, romanized: Filorthodoxos Etaireia) was a secret political and revolutionary organization. Established in June 1839, it aimed to strengthen the position of the Eastern Orthodox Church within the Kingdom of Greece and expand its borders. The organization was directly associated with the Russian Party.

Its plans were uncovered in December 1839 through betrayal before they could be carried out. Its discovery contributed to the dismissal of Greek Minister of Internal Affairs Georgios Glarakis and the Ecumenical Patriarch of Constantinople Gregory VI.

== Background ==
The first political parties in the nascent Greek state after the Greek War of Independence were centered around gaining the favor of one of the three Great Powers, namely France, Great Britain and Russia. The Russian Party's support base centered around Spetses, central Peloponnese and Phocis. Similarly to the French and English Parties, it supported the irredentist concept of Megali Idea, under the terms of which all areas with large ethnic Greek populations were to be incorporated into the Greek state. The Russian Party supporters (or "Napaioi") believed that Orthodox Christianity was directly tied with Greek national identity and saw the Ecumenical Patriarch of Constantinople as de facto the leader of the Greek national liberation struggle. They also believed that a Russian intervention would eventually lead to the collapse of the Ottoman Empire and the creation of a powerful Greek state governed by an Orthodox king.

King Otto, a devout Catholic had ruled the Kingdom of Greece since 1832. In 1833, the Church of Greece became independent from the Ottoman controlled Patriarchate. The Church of Greece was controlled by the Holy Synod which in turn gave oath to Otto. The rule of a Catholic king over a fellow Orthodox nation and the separation from the Patriarchate were seen as detrimental to the interests of the Russian state which exerted its influence through the Patriarchate. In 1838, Georgios Kapodistrias arrived in Athens with the intent of claiming the property of his assassinated older brother Ioannis who had served as the first Governor of Greece. The Russian Party which was at the helm of the Greek government wished to use the prestige Kapodistrias' name carried in Greek society to further its goals. Kapodistrias' arrival served as the impetus for the creation of the conspiracy.

== Operation ==
The Philorthodox Society was founded in June 1839 by Nikitas Stamatelopoulos and Georgios Kapodistrias. Its aims included the annexation of Ottoman controlled Thessaly, Macedonia and Epirus into the Greek state. To this effect anonymous pamphlets calling for a revolt were distributed in the aforementioned regions. It also pursued the strengthening of Orthodox Christianity and the eventual replacement of King Otto by an Orthodox ruler. The religious aspect of the conspiracy was the dominant one, uniting an otherwise heterodox group of people. It also sought to ban all American religious schools and books printed by Protestant missions.

While Stamatelopoulos and Kapodistrias officially controlled the military and political aspects of the society, the de facto leadership was held by Minister of Internal Affairs Georgios Glarakis and Gennaios Kolokotronis. Other notable personalities implicated in the conspiracy included cleric Konstantinos Oikonomos, Theodoros Kolokotronis, Michael Soutzos, Andreas Metaxas, admiral Georgios Androutsos and politician Nikolaos Renieris. Initiation into the society was performed in front of an icon of the Holy Trinity through a series of questions and answers which ended in an oath.

In December 1839, the Philorthodox Society's members decided to act upon their plans in anticipation of a rumored Russian army attack on Constantinople. The plotters met in the house of a secretary of the Russian embassy Lelis. They decided to arrest Otto on 1 January 1840, during the new year's liturgy and force him to either convert to Orthodoxy or abdicate. Soon after the decision to act was taken, one of the plotters Emmanouil Pappas gave the documents revealing the conspiracy's existence to Tsamis Karatasos. Karatasos in turn gave the documents to the king who ordered an investigation of the affair. Pappas had decided to betray the plot after being denied a high rank within the organization. On 23 December having gathered additional evidence, Greek authorities arrested Kapodistrias, Stamatelopoulos and Renieris.

== Aftermath ==
A trial of the plotters began on 11 July 1840. Most of the defendants were acquitted early on, with the exception of Kapodistrias and Stamatelopoulos. The judges accepted the argument that Kapodistrias and Stamatelopoulos had declared themselves leaders of the Philorthodox Society on their own accord and that the formation of the secret society had not been completed. They therefore could not be persecuted for forming a criminal organization and were subsequently acquitted.

While Otto considered the conspiracy as a considerable threat to this rule, the Minister of Justice Andronikos Paikos tried to portray it as insignificant event caused by a small group of radicals to foreign diplomats. So as to maintain a delicate balance of neutrality in the relations between Greece and the great powers. On the other hand, members of the British and French Parties collaborated with the respective embassies of Great Britain and France to weaken the Russian Party by greatly exaggerating the scale of the conspiracy. This was done by ignoring the religious aspects of the organization, while emphasizing its irredentist character. Otto's reaction was limited to replacing Minister of Internal Affairs Georgios Glarakis with Nikolaos Theocharis. He refused to publicly implicate Russia in the affair or purge Russian Party members from the political scene. Because doing so would reveal his unpopularity and cause animosity in Russia.

The discovery of a letter written by Georgios Kapodistrias to Ecumenical Patriarch of Constantinople Gregory VI greatly troubled the British authorities. Who believed that members of the conspiracy had infiltrated the British controlled United States of the Ionian Islands and were planning to overthrow its government. Gregory VI had harshly criticized the influence exerted by Lutheran-Calvinist missionaries on its citizens and the changes to family law enacted in the states. The British exiled suspected members of the conspiracy to monasteries and desolate islands, cut off communication with Greece and enacted postal censorship. Gregory VI was eventually removed from his position by the Ottomans due to pressure exerted by British diplomats. The Philorthodox Society scandal gave fuel to rumors that the Greek state would destabilize the Balkans and caused damage to external trade. Otto was forced to publicly espouse irredentist policies, in order to stymie private initiatives which could lead to his dethronement. After the discovery of the plot, the Ottoman Empire augmented its garrisons in Thessaly.
