= Temple of Artemis Knakeatis =

- Ναός Αρτέμιδος Κνακεάτιδος
- Interactive map of Temple of Artemis Knakeatis

General information
- Type: Temple
- Architectural style: Doric
- Completed: 6th century BCE
- Height: 1,250 m (4,100 ft)

Technical details
- Material: Doliana marble

The Temple of Artemis Knakeatis is an ancient Greek temple dating from the 6th century BCE, located near the village of Mavriki in Arcadia, at the site called Psilí Ráchi on Marmarovouni Hill, at an altitude of about 1,250 meters. It was dedicated to the goddess Artemis. Today, only its ruins survive, which have nevertheless made possible a detailed reconstruction of its appearance.

The temple was constructed entirely from Doliana marble, named after the quarry located near the site of the present-day village of Doliana. It is believed to have been the first temple in mainland Greece built exclusively of this material. It was constructed in Doric order, belonging to the "Aeginetan School" of craftsmanship. Inside stood a large statue of the goddess Artemis, made of ebony, a small fragment of which has survived. The temple is also mentioned by the ancient geographer Pausanias, in his survired work "Description of Greece": (Note: Παυσανία - Αρκαδικά, 53.11)

"...As one travels from Tegea toward Laconia, there is on the left side of the road an altar of Pan, and also one of Zeus Lycaios; and the foundations of sanctuaries remain. These altars are about two stadia from the city walls. Advancing about seven stadia farther, there is a sanctuary of Artemis Limnatis and a statue of the goddess made of ebony wood, crafted in the Aeginetan style. About ten stadia beyond this are the ruins of the temple of Artemis Knakeatis." Pausanias, Arcadica, 53-11

Archaeological evidence suggests that the worship of Artemis in the area dates back to the 8th century BCE.
