= Doliana, Arcadia =

Greek community

Doliana (Greek: Δολιανά) is a community of the municipality North Kynouria, in eastern Arcadia, Greece. It consists of the villages Kato Doliana, Ano Doliana, Dragouni, Kouvlis, Prosilia and Rouneika. The population of the community is 723 (2021 census). The largest village of the community is Kato Doliana. It serves as the winter residence of the population of Ano Doliana. It is considered a traditional settlement.

== Demographic evolution ==
Demographic evolution
Year	Community
1834	893
1861	1,336
1870	1,323
1879	1,682
1889	1,577
1896	1,649
1907	1,627
1920	1,849
1928	1,796
1940	1,680
1951	1,650
1961	1,497
1971	1,404
1981	1,338
1991	1,283
2001	1,097
2011	846
2021	723

== See also ==
- Ano Doliana, the mountainous residency of the settlers
- Kato Doliana, the main residency of the settlers
- List of settlements in Arcadia
- List of traditional settlements of Greece
