= Dimitrios Papaioannou (footballer, born 2001) =

Greek footballer

Personal information
- Full name: Dimitrios Papaioannou
- Date of birth: 4 October 2001 (age 25)
- Place of birth: Greece
- Position: Midfielder

Team information
- Current team: Doxa Drama
- Number: 37

Youth career
- –2019: Doxa Drama

Senior career*
Years	Team	Apps	(Gls)
2019–	Doxa Drama	13	(0)
- * Club domestic league appearances and goals as of 18 May 2021

Dimitrios Papaioannou (Greek: Δημήτριος Παπαϊωάννου; born 4 October 2001) is a Greek professional footballer who plays as a midfielder for Super League 2 club Doxa Drama.
