= Papathanasiou =

Papathanasiou (Greek: Παπαθανασίου) is a Greek family name. People with this name include:

- Evangelos Odysseas Papathanassiou, better known as Vangelis, musician
- Vassiliki Papathanasiou, better known as Vicky Leandros, singer
- Leandros Papathanasiou, better known as Leo Leandros, musician
- Aspasia Papathanasiou, Greek actress
- Andreas Papathanasiou (born 1983), Cypriot footballer
- Yannis Papathanasiou (born 1954), Greek politician
- Aimilios Papathanasiou (born 1973), Greek sailor
