= Ioannis Papaioannou (actor) =

Ioannis Papaioanou (Serres, 1869 – Athens, 1931) was a Greek comic actor of musical theater and the most important Greek troupe leader of operetta. He was born in Serres in 1869 and died in Athens in 1931. He appeared in the theater for the first time in Serres in 1892, with the comedy "Old Man's Lyra-Nicolas", by D. Kokkos. As a troupe leader, he successfully staged many foreign and Greek operettas. He had an average voice, but excellent acting skills. He is considered as the pillar of the Greek operetta, next to its creator, Theophrastos Sakellaridis.
