= Nikitaras =

Greek revolutionary (c. 1784 – 1849)

Nikitaras Νικηταράς
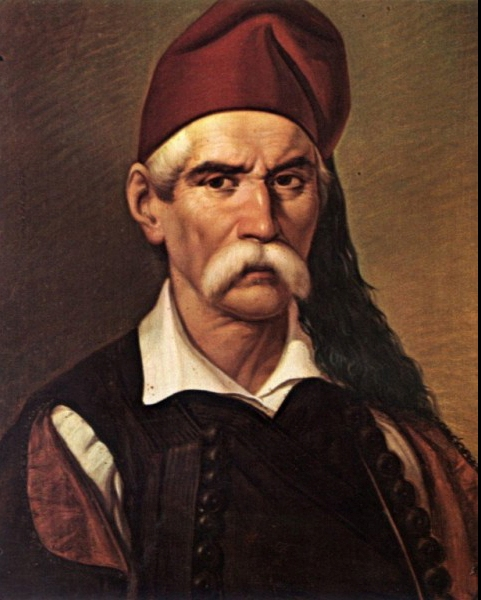
- A portrait of Nikitaras.
- Born: Nikitas Stamatelopoulos; Νικήτας Σταματελόπουλος c. 1784; Nedoussa, Messenia or Leontari, Arcadia, Ottoman Empire (now Greece)
- Died: c. 1849; Piraeus, Kingdom of Greece
- Burial place: First Cemetery of Athens
- Relatives: Theodoros Kolokotronis (uncle)
- Military career
- Allegiance: Russian Empire; First Hellenic Republic; Kingdom of Greece
- Branch: Imperial Russian Army; Hellenic Army
- Nicknames: The Turk-Eater; Ο Τουρκοφάγος
- Unit: Greek Legion
- Conflicts: Napoleonic Wars: War of the Third Coalition; Anglo-Russian invasion of Naples; Greek War of Independence: Siege of Tripolitsa; Battle of Valtetsi; Battle of Doliana; Greek Civil Wars; Battle of Dervenakia; Third Siege of Missolonghi; Battle of Arachova

Signature
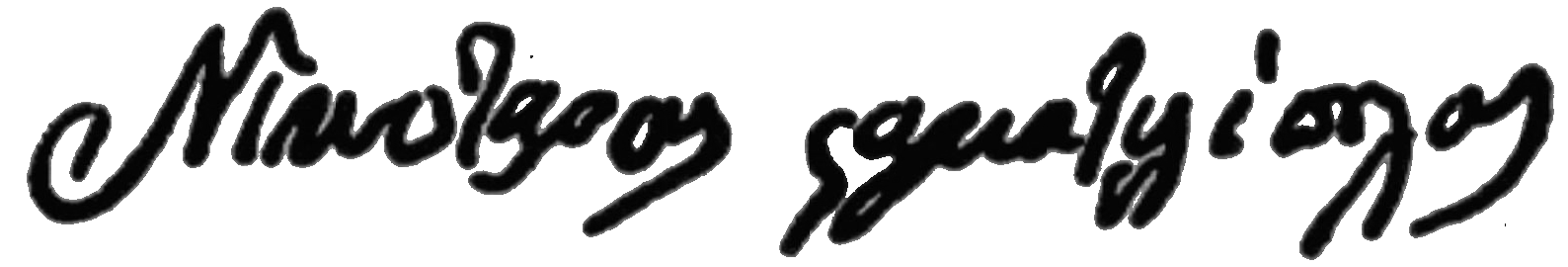

Nikitaras (Greek: Νικηταράς) was the nom de guerre of Nikitas Stamatelopoulos (Greek: Νικήτας Σταματελόπουλος) (c. 1784 – 1849), a Greek revolutionary in the Greek War of Independence. Due to his fighting prowess, he was known as Turkofagos or Turkophagos (Greek: Τουρκοφάγος), literally meaning the "Turk-Eater".

== Biography ==
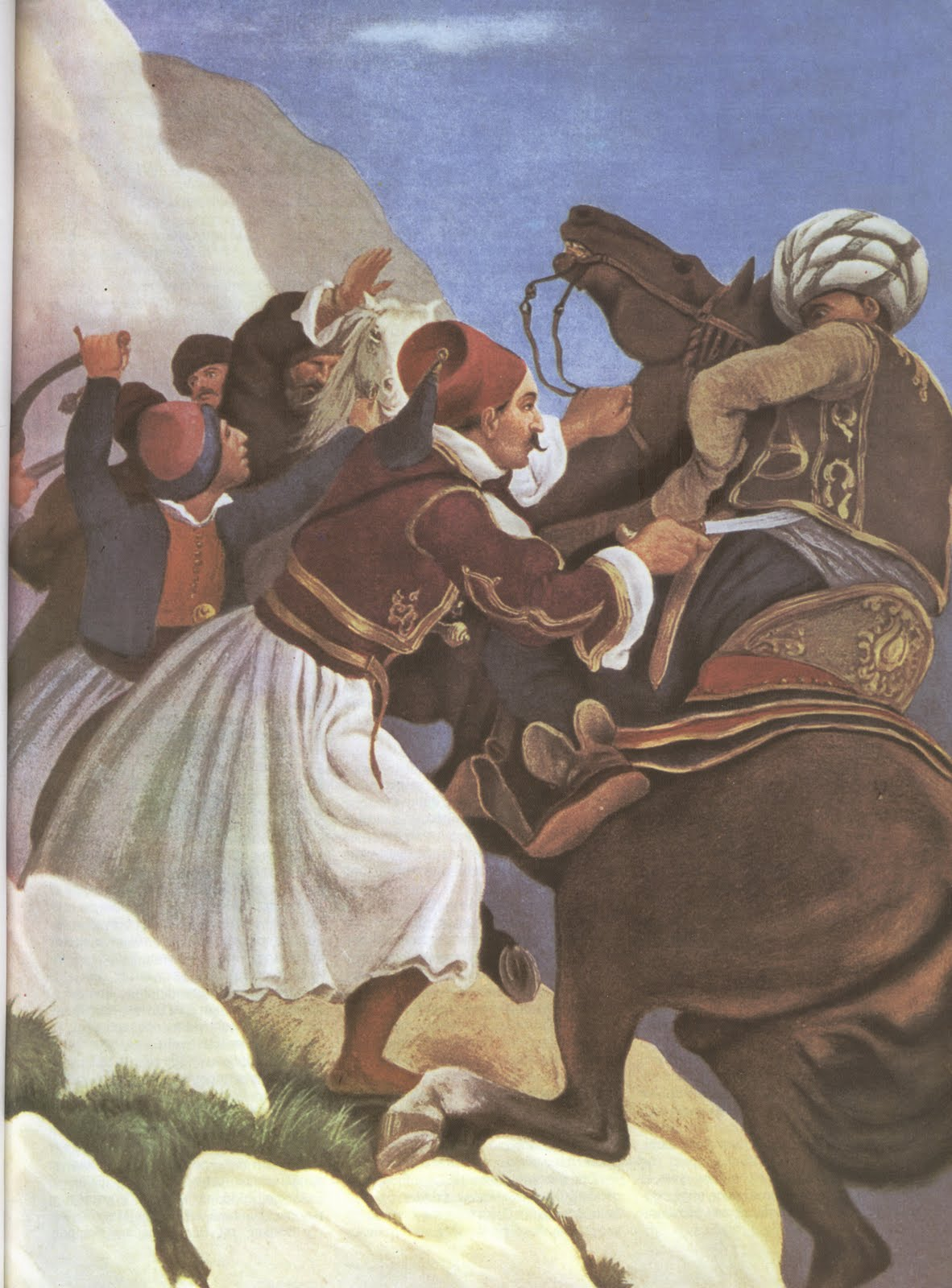
Nikitaras by Peter von Hess.

The date and place of Nikitaras' birth are disputed, but he is thought to have been born either in the village of Nedoussa (Νέδουσα) in the Peloponnesian province of Messenia or in Leontari in Arcadia circa 1784. He was a nephew of Theodoros Kolokotronis, the most important Greek military leader of the Revolution. Turkish authorities tried to capture him, as well as Kolokotronis, but he escaped and joined his uncle in the British-held Ionian Islands.

In 1805, Nikitaras enlisted in the Greek Legion of the Septinsular Republic. Between August 1805 and January 1806, he participated in the Anglo-Russian invasion of Naples. Fighting alongside Russian troops, he particularly distinguished himself during the campaign.

When the Greek war of Independence began, both returned to the mainland. He was with Kolokotronis, who commanded the Greek army at the Siege of Tripoli early in the war. When the commander and his men tried to escape the city, Nikitaras and his troops cut off the escape of the Turkish commander and his troops and slaughtered them. Nikitaras achieved fame and his sobriquet "Turk-Eater" in the Battle of Dervenakia, where he is said to have used five swords: four broke from excessive use. During the civil war within the Revolution, he sided with his uncle against the faction around Alexandros Mavrokordatos.

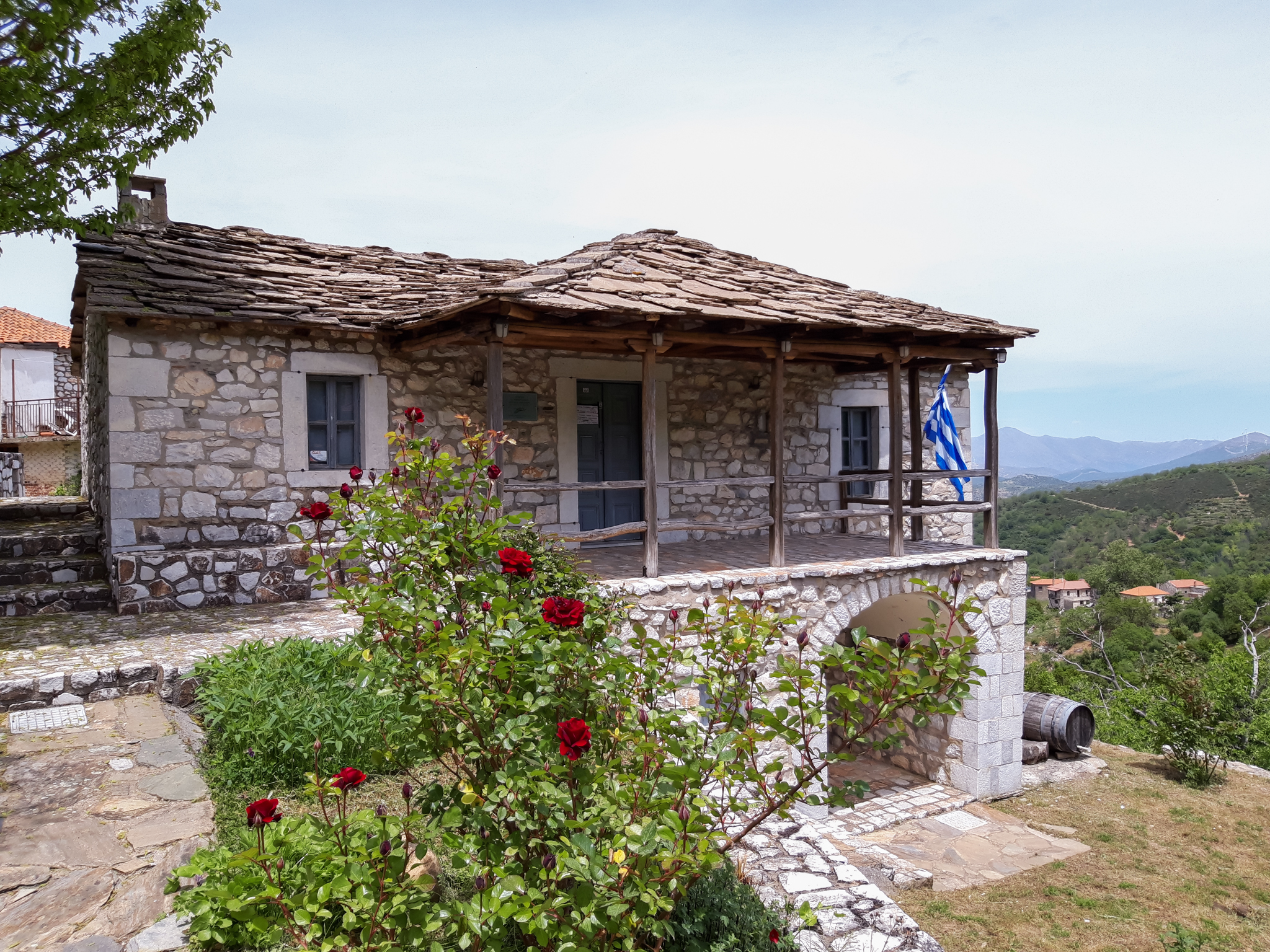
The house in which Nikitaras was forted up during the Battle of Doliana, has been transformed into a museum.

Nikitaras was a strong patriot, not corrupt like many of the leaders of the Revolution. When Ioannis Kolettis asked him to kill a rival, Odysseas Androutsos, in exchange for a government position, Nikitaras refused the offer and became angry with Kolettis. He also refused to take booty after battle, a normal practice of Balkan irregulars at the time. After the Revolution he and his family were living in poverty.

After the war, Nikitaras was jailed with his uncle Kolokotronis as strong opponents of the Bavarian Regency.

In June 1839, Nikitaras founded the Filorthodoxos Eteria secret society with Georgios Kapodistrias and other members of Russian Party. Its aims included the promotion of the Christian Orthodox faith and the annexation of Ottoman controlled Thessaly, Macedonia and Epirus into the Greek state. In December 1839, Filorthodoxos Eteria's members decided to act upon their plans in anticipation of a rumored Russian army attack on Constantinople. They decided to arrest Otto on 1 January 1840, during the new year's liturgy and force him to either convert to Orthodoxy or abdicate. Soon after the decision to act was taken, one of the plotters Emmanouil Pappas gave the documents revealing the conspiracy's existence. On 23 December having gathered additional evidence, Greek authorities arrested Kapodistrias and Nikitaras. A trial of the plotters began on 11 July 1840. The judges accepted the argument that Kapodistrias and Stamatelopoulos had declared themselves leaders of the Filorthodoxos Eteria on their own accord and that the formation of the secret society had not been completed. They therefore could not be persecuted for forming a criminal organization and were subsequently acquitted.

He was also a strong campaigner for the rights of those who fought in the Revolution. Nikitaras was released from prison in 1841, but the period in jail broke his health and he died in 1849 in Piraeus.

== Legacy ==
He is especially famous for his words during the Third Siege of Missolonghi. When he arrived in the city with supplies, soldiers, who had not been paid in months, asked him if he had brought any money. Nikitaras, angry, flung down his sword, a weapon taken from a Turk he had killed, uttering the words: "I have only my sword, and that I gladly give for my country."

Nikitaras is remembered in the poem by Nikos Gatsos, "The Knight and Death".

Nikitaras' nickname "Turkofagos" was written on one of the AR-15–style rifles used in the Christchurch mosque shootings.

Political offices
Preceded by New title	Speaker of the Hellenic Parliament; 7 September 1844 – 20 December 1844	Succeeded by Kanellos Deligiannis
