= Karpos Papadopoulos =

Greek merchant, writer and revolutionary

- Native name: Κάρπος Παπαδόπουλος
- Born: Polykarpos Papadopoulos; Πολύκαρπος Παπαδόπουλος; 1795; Adrianopolis, Ottoman Empire
- Died: 1871 (aged 75–76) Missolonghi, Kingdom of Greece
- Buried: Garden of Heroes, Missolonghi
- Allegiance: Revolutionary Greece; First Hellenic Republic; Kingdom of Greece
- Rank: Captain
- Commands: Provost marshal of Skiathos; Provost marshal of Palamidi
- Conflicts: Greek War of Independence; Battle of the Lerna Mills

Polykarpos "Karpos" Papadopoulos (Greek: Πολύκαρπος (Κάρπος) Παπαδόπουλος; 1795–1871) was a Greek Colonel, writer and merchant, who served as the Provost marshal of Skiathos during the Greek War of Independence.

== Early life ==
Polykarpos Papadopoulos was born in 1785 in Adrianopolis, Ottoman Empire (present-day, Edirne, Turkey).

In 1818, Papadopoulos was initiated into Filiki Eteria. Before the Greek War of Independence Papadopoulos was a merchant.

== Military Career ==
=== Greek War of Independence ===
At the start of the revolution he left Odessa and went to Central Greece to fight on the side of Odysseas Androutsos, the latter giving him the title of chiliarch, but shortly after asking him to fight as a simple soldier. In 1825, after the death of Androutsos, he fought alone against Ibrahim and participated in the Battle of the Lerna Mills. He served for some time in the army of Demetrios Ypsilantis, but in the last years of the revolution fought in the army of Charles Nicolas Fabvier.

By 1828, Papadopoulos was the Provost marshal of Skiathos. Papadopoulos was awarded the rank of Captain and later become a Colonel.

=== Kingdom of Greece ===
In 1930, Papadopoulos was appointed the guard commander of Palamidi.

During the reign of Otto of Greece, Papadopoulos enlisted in the army. Following demobilization Papadopoulos settled in Missolonghi.

== Later life ==
Following the revolution Papadopoulos wrote several books about follow Greek Revolutionaries.

In 1871, Papadopoulos died aged 75–76 in Missolonghi, and is buried in the towns Garden of Heroes.

Papadopoulos' memoirs were published posthumously in 1976.
