= Petra, Boeotia =

Petra Πέτρα
- Community
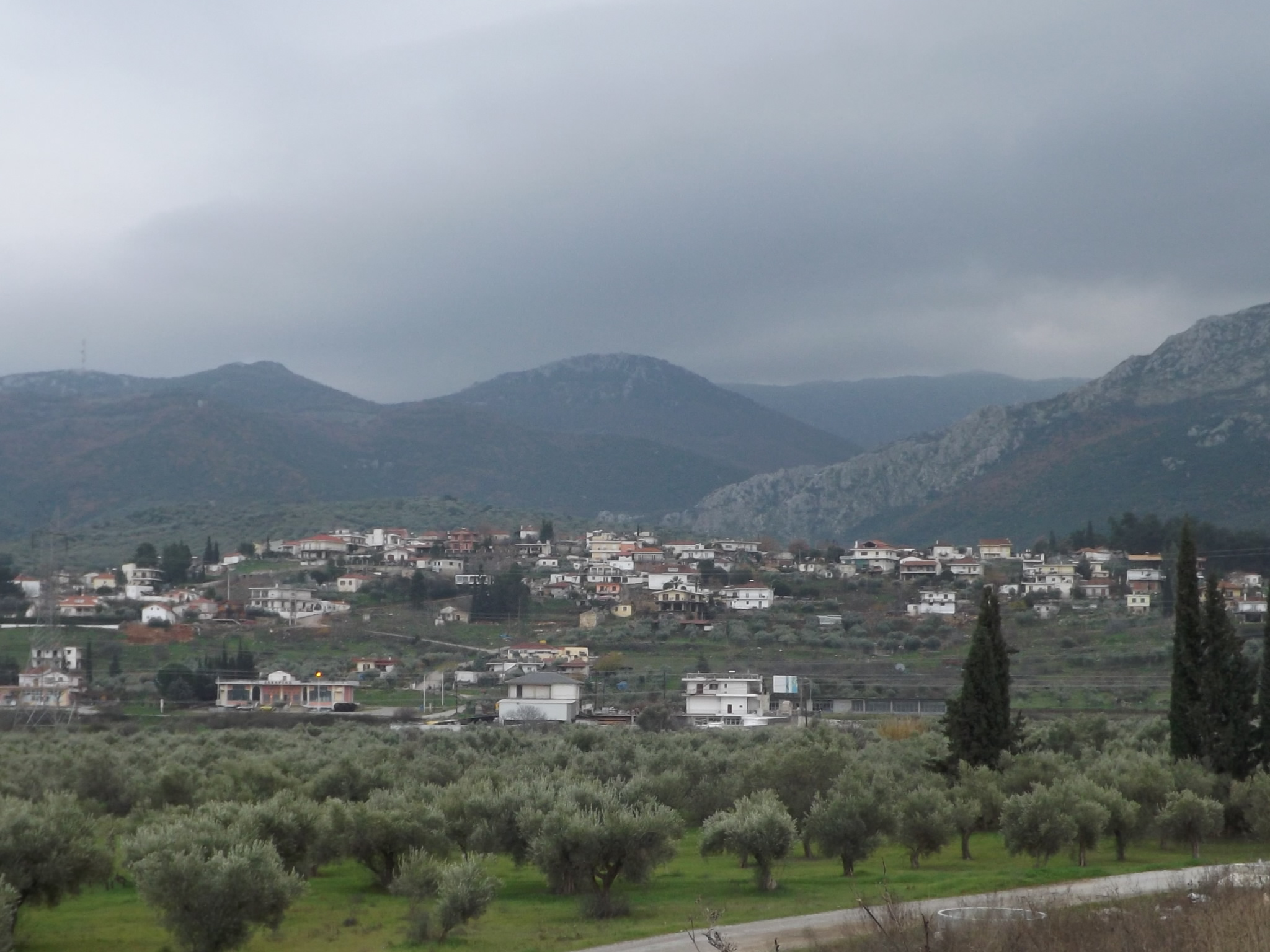
- A view of Petra

- Location within Greece
- Coordinates: 38°22.267′N 23°3.45′E
- Country: Greece
- Administrative region: Central Greece
- Regional unit: Boeotia
- Municipality: Aliartos-Thespies
- Municipal unit: Aliartos

Area
  - Community: 24.451 km^{2} (9.441 sq mi)
- Elevation: 190 m (620 ft)

Population (2021)
  - Community: 320
  - Density: 13/km^{2} (34/sq mi)
- Time zone: UTC+2 (EET)
  - Summer (DST): UTC+3 (EEST)
- Postal code: 320 01
- Area code: +30-2368
- Vehicle registration: ΒΙ

Petra (Greek: Πέτρα) is a village and a community of the Aliartos-Thespies municipality. Before the 2011 local government reform it was part of the municipality of Aliartos, of which it was a municipal district. The 2021 census recorded 320 inhabitants in the village. The community of Petra covers an area of 24.451 km^{2}.

== History ==
In July 1829, Petra was the site of the Battle of Petra, the last battle of the Greek War of Independence.

== See also ==
- List of settlements in Boeotia
