= Metaxas =

Metaxās or Metaxa may refer to:

== Places ==
- Metaxas Line, fortifications in northeastern Greece in 1935–1940
- Metaxas, Greece, a village in the Greek region of Macedonia
- Metaxas Regime or 4th of August Regime, a short-lived authoritarian regime in Greece from 1936 to 1941

== People with the surname ==
- Anastasios Metaxas (1862–1937), Greek architect and competitive marksman
- Andreas Metaxas (1790–1860), Greek politician
- Konstantinos Metaxas (1793–1870), Greek fighter of the Greek War of Independence and politician from Cephalonia
- Christina Metaxa (born 1992), Cypriot singer
- Dimitris Metaxas, Greek-American computer scientist
- Doris Metaxa (1911–2007), French tennis player
- Eric Metaxas (born 1963), American author
- Georges Metaxa (1899–1950), Romanian singer and actor
- Ioannis Metaxas (1871–1941), Greek general, prime minister and dictator
- Nemone Metaxas (born 1972), English DJ, presenter, producer, and athlete
- Nikolas Metaxas (born 1988), Cypriot singer

== Other uses ==
- Metaxa, a Greek brandy-based liqueur

== See also ==
- Georg von Metaxa (1914–1944), Austrian tennis player
