= Frankish towers of Greece =

List of towers built during the duchy of Athens

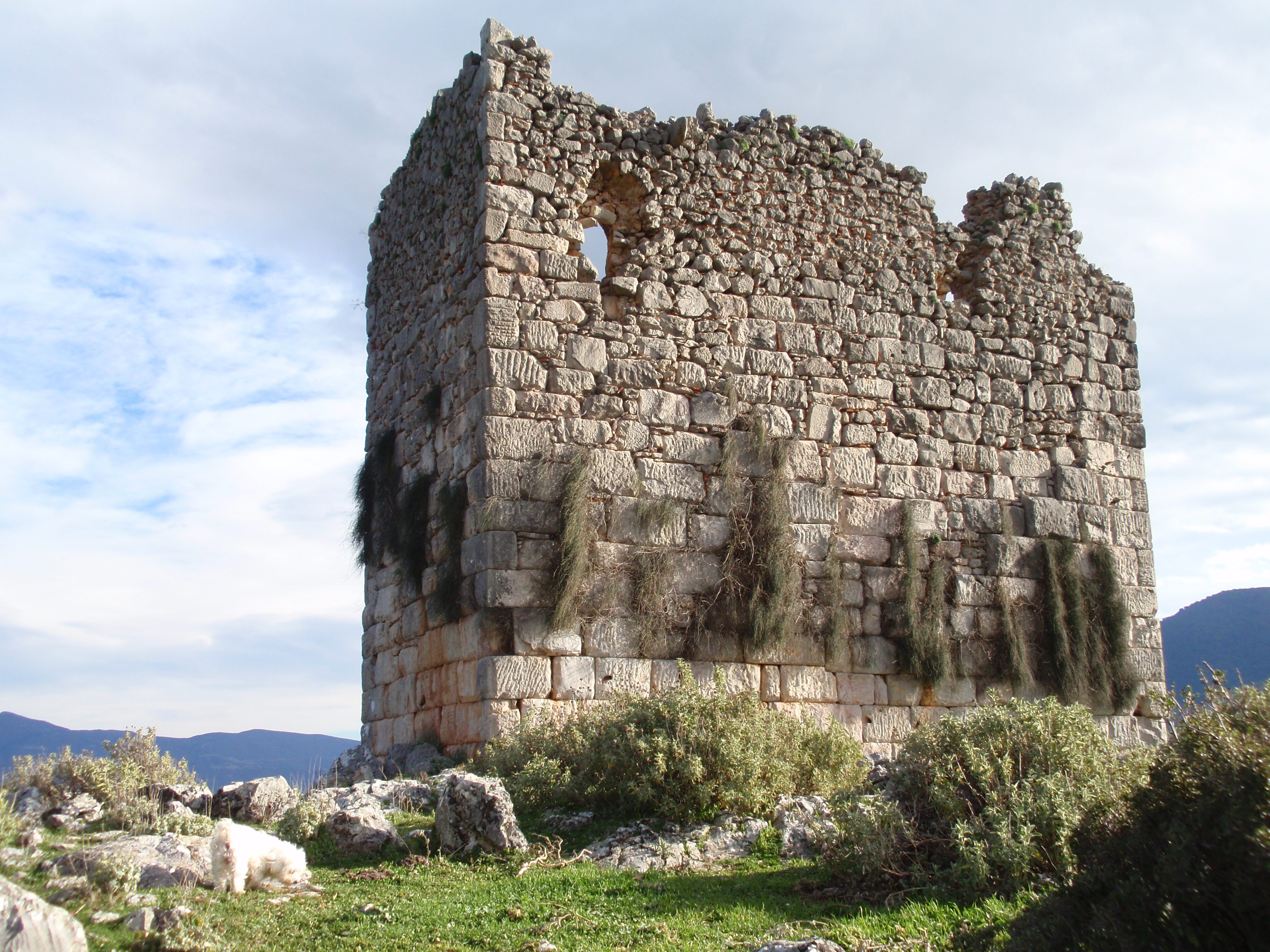

The Frankish towers of Greece (Greek: Φράγκικοι πύργοι) are the towers built during the period of Frankish rule in Greece (ca. 1204 – 1500), either for defence or for habitation, by the Frankish Crusaders, of which many survive to this day.

- Frankish Tower (Acropolis of Athens) on the Acropolis of Athens, demolished in 1874
- Frankish Tower at Agia Marina, Boeotia, vanished since the 19th century
- Frankish Tower (Aliartos) in Aliartos, Boeotia
- Tower of Amfikleia in Amfikleia, Phthiotis
- Frankish Tower (Ano Tithorea) in Ano Tithorea, Phthiotis
- Frankish Tower at Antikyra, Boeotia, demolished in the 1960s
- Frankish Tower (Askri) in Askri, Boeotia
- Frankish Tower (Avlonari) in Avlonari, Euboea
- Frankish Tower (Chalandritsa) in Chalandritsa, Achaea
- Frankish Tower (Davleia) in Davleia, Boeotia
- Frankish Tower at Gla, Boeotia, vanished since the 19th century
- Frankish Tower (Harma) in Harma, Boeotia
- Frankish Tower (Kirra) in Kirra, Phocis
- Frankish Tower (Koroneia) in Koroneia, Boeotia
- Frankish Tower (Liada) in Markopoulo, Attica
- Two Towers of Mytikas in the Lelantine Plain, Euboea
- Frankish Tower (Lilaia) in Lilaia, Phocis
- Frankish Tower (Livadostro) in Livadostro, Boeotia
- Frankish Tower (Melissochori) in Melissochori, Boeotia
- Frankish Tower of Oinoi in Marathonas, Attica
- Frankish Tower (Panakton) in Panakton, Boeotia
- Frankish Tower (Paralimni) in Paralimni, Boeotia
- Frankish Tower (Parorion) in Parorion, Boeotia
- Frankish Tower (Polydrosos) in Polydrosos, Phocis
- Frankish Tower (Pyrgos) in Pyrgos, Boeotia
- Frankish Tower at Inofyta, Boeotia, demolished during World War II
- Frankish Tower (Tanagra) in Tanagra, Boeotia
- Frankish Tower (Tatitza) in Tatitza, Boeotia
- Frankish Tower (Thisvi) in Thisvi, Boeotia
- Frankish Tower (Thourio) in Thourio, Boeotia
- Frankish Tower (Varnavas) in Varnavas, Attica
- Frankish Tower (Vravrona) in Vravrona, Attica
- Frankish Tower at Yliki, Boeotia, vanished under the waters of the Yliki reservoir
- Frankish Tower (Ypsilantis) in Ypsilantis, Boeotia

== Sources ==
- Lock, Peter (1986). "The Frankish Towers of Central Greece". The Annual of the British School at Athens. 81: 101–123. doi:10.1017/S0068245400020104. S2CID 129263771.
- Nicolle, David (2007). Crusader Castles in Cyprus, Greece and the Aegean 1191-1571. Fortress. Osprey Publishing. ISBN 978-1-84176-976-9.
