= Mitzou =

Mitzou (Greek: Μήτζου) is a Greek surname. Notable people with the surname include:

- Georgios Mitzou (died 1869), Greek revolutionary leader
- Petros Mitzou (died 1825), Greek revolutionary leader
