= Andreas Metaxas =

Greek politician (1790–1860)

- Ανδρέας Μεταξάς
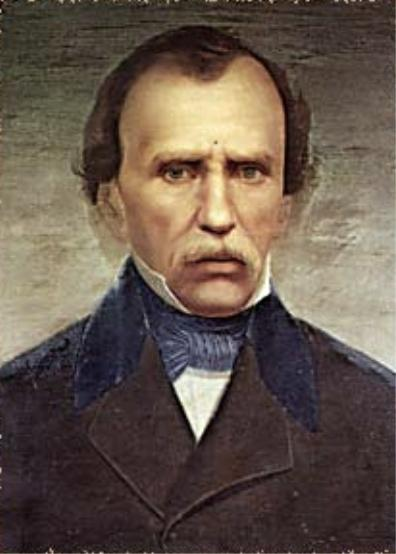
- Andreas Metaxas, oil painting in the National Historical Museum

Prime Minister of Greece
- In office 3 September 1843 – 12 February 1844
- Monarch: Otto
- Preceded by: Direct Rule by Otto
- Succeeded by: Konstantinos Kanaris

Minister of Military Affairs
- In office July 1841 – August 1841
- Monarch: Otto
- Prime Minister: Alexandros Mavrokordatos

Personal details
- Born: c. 1790 Kefalonia, Republic of Venice (now Greece)
- Died: 8 September 1860 (aged 70) Athens, Kingdom of Greece
- Party: Russian Party
- Spouse: Marietta Vourvachi
- Relations: Konstantinos Metaxas (cousin); Dionysios Vourvachis (brother-in-law)
- Children: Spyros Metaxas; Petros Metaxas
- Awards: Grand Cross of the Order of the Redeemer
- Nickname(s): Conte Lalas; Κόντε Λάλας

Military service
- Allegiance: (Greece) First Hellenic Republic
- Branch/service: Hellenic Army
- Battles/wars: Greek War of Independence; Battle of Lalas (WIA); Battle of the Lerna Mills

Andreas Metaxas (Greek: Ανδρέας Μεταξάς; c. 1790 – 19 September 1860) was a Greek politician, fighter of the Greek War of Independence and diplomat from Cephalonia. He was prime minister of Greece from 3 September 1843 to 16 February 1844. Some military leaders of the revolution (Makriyannis) gave him the ironic nickname of "Conte Lalas'" due to his injury during the Battle of Lalas.

== Biography ==
=== Origins and personal life ===
Born in 1790 in Argostoli he belonged to the historical Metaxas family, which originated in Constantinople and moved to Kefalonia in the 15th century. He was the second son of Petros Metaxas and Violeta Loverdou and had three brothers, Anastasios, Paisios and Ioannis. Konstantinos Metaxas was his cousin. Although he did not receive any special education, other than Greek he was fluent in Italian and French and was a scholar of ancient Greek history. A few years before the Greek Revolution he married Marietta Vourvachi, sister of a Greek officer in the French army, Dionysios, with whom he had two sons (Spyros and Petros) and two daughters. In pre-revolutionary years, he worked as a solicitor.

=== Greek War of Independence ===
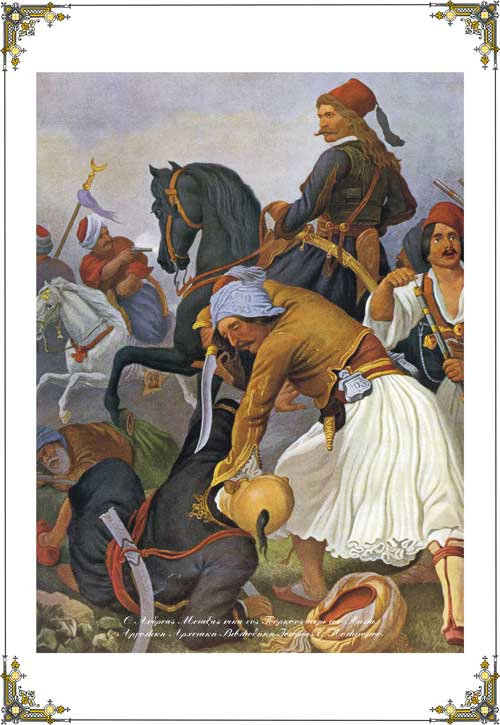
Andreas Metaxas during the Battle of Lalas by Peter von Hess

He was initiated into Filiki Eteria. When the revolution was declared, he rushed to Peloponnese and established, along with his brother Anastasios and his cousin Konstantinos, a military contingent of 350 men from Kefalonia equipped with two cannons, contribution of Evangelinos Panas. Among the leaders were Victor Gerasimos Fokas, Konstantinos Fokas Karandinos and others. Claiming that they were chasing pirates, they boarded a ship belonged to Anastasios and Fokas Theodoratou brothers, which was equipped with 18 cannons, 50 sailors and 50 gunmen. They disembarked in early May 1821 in Glarentza and marched to Manolada. There, they were joined by other military captains (Vilaetis, Sisinis and Plapoutas) and then marched to Lalas, which was the foothold of notorious Albanian fighters. During the battles that took place in the region and until 13 June, when all the people from Lalas had to resort to Patra, Metaxas was among the noteworthy. He even got wounded in both hands by bullets. Later, after Demetrios Ypsilantis' suggestion, he was sent, along with the rest of the army, to Patra. Soon, due to his injury, he was only active in the political part of the revolution.

On 25 May 1822, in a unanimous decision, the "Executive Body" passed an act by which Metaxas was naturalized as a Greek Peloponnese citizen for his service to his country. He was appointed Minister of Police in 1822, and Minister of War in April 1826. He took part in, and also organized the defense during, the Battle of the Lerna Mills.

He was a member of the National Assembly of Argos and member of the Provisional Government. Along with Georgios Mavromichalis and Germanos III of Old Patras, he was sent by the Government to Verona in search for financial resources but also to persuade the Great Powers to not act against Greece, in which he succeeded with the help of his friend Ioannis Kapodistrias.

=== Kapodistrian period ===
Andreas Metaxas was the prime mover behind Ioannis Kapodistrias' election. He was a devout supporter of Kapodistrias and remained his faithful ally to the end. In return Kapodistrias honored him by promoting him to high dignities. On his own initiative, he joined the Panellinion, was appointed head of the army and Emergency Commissioner of the Peloponnese. From this position Metaxas mainly helped organizing the tactical army. After the assassination of Kapodistrias in 1831, although pro-Russian, Metaxas opposed the election of Augustine Kapodistrias which he found disastrous. Nevertheless, he kept away from Ioannis Kolettis' disruptive tendencies. Despite that, he remained a member of the provisional government until the arrival of King Otto.

=== Period of King Otto ===
During the Regency he was appointed Prefect of Laconia, and later, in October 1835, member of the Council of State. Soon, however, he was exiled to Marseilles by the Regency for his liberal views. He was later called back and sent to Spain as ambassador of Greece. After his return to Greece in 1839, he was re-appointed to the State Council. He served as Minister for Military Affairs in the government of Alexandros Mavrokordatos during July and August 1841. He took over the leadership of the Russian Party after Theodoros Kolokotronis' death.

Following the 3 September 1843 Revolution, he received a mandate by Otto to form a government to prepare elections for a constitutional assembly. A few days later, under the threat that he would resign unless his proposal was accepted, he managed to convince the cabinet to broaden the government with the participation of Alexandros Mavrokordatos and Ioannis Kolettis, leaders of the English and French party respectively. Metaxas was the first government leader in the political history of Greece who was named "prime minister".

During his premiership, Metaxas managed to maintain order and conduct elections in order to form the First National Assembly. He was elected Honorary Vice-President in five regions and participated in its actions. In next year's elections for the First Period (1844–1845), he was elected Attica MP. He was appointed Minister of Finance in Kolettis' government, a position he held from August 1844 until August 1845, when he resigned after Kolettis' effort to overthrow the constitution. He served as a senator during the years 1846 and 1847 and from 1850 until 1859 as an Attica MP. In 1850, he was promoted to the rank of Lieutenant General and was decorated by King Otto with the Grand Cross of the Order of the Redeemer. On 15 September of the same year, he was sent to Istanbul as ambassador of Greece.

He resigned on 10 March 1854, after the start of the Crimean War, and returned to Athens where he retired from politics. It appears that he secretly supported the revolt movement of Thessaly and Epirus and changed the King's hasty decision to get involved, when he secretly rushed to the palace and convinced him not to go there, thus preventing any suffering for Greece. Shortly before his death, Otto assigned him to form a government but he refused.

Andreas Metaxas also served as president of the Society for the Promotion of Education and Learning and many charity foundations. Throughout his life he was brave, honest, patriotic and had a strong character.

He died in Athens in September 1860.

Political offices
Preceded by King Otto (absolute monarch)	Prime Minister of Greece; 3 September 1843 - 12 February 1844	Succeeded by Konstantinos Kanaris
