= Leontari =

Leontari may refer to places in Greece:

- Leontari, Arcadia
- Leontari, Boeotia
- Leontari, Karditsa
