= Leontari, Boeotia =

Leontari Λεοντάρι
- Community
- Location within Greece
- Coordinates: 38°18′N 23°10′E
- Country: Greece
- Administrative region: Central Greece
- Regional unit: Boeotia
- Municipality: Aliartos-Thespies
- Municipal unit: Thespies

Population (2021)
  - Community: 625
- Time zone: UTC+2 (EET)
  - Summer (DST): UTC+3 (EEST)

Leontari (Greek: Λεοντάρι, before 1930: Κασκαβέλι - Kaskaveli, Arvanite / Albanian: indef. / def. Kackavel/i) is a town in the municipal unit of Thespies in Boeotia, Greece.

== History ==
The city of Leontari was founded at the end of the 14th or beginning of the 15th century by Albanian settlers, the so-called Arvanites, under the leadership of Zogra Kobili. Leontari was first attested as hamlet in the Ottoman census of 1466. Initially the village was named after its founder. Later, and until 1930, the town was named Kaskaveli or Kobili, variants of the name of the founder. In 1930 it was renamed to Leontari ("Lion" in Greek) after an ancient Greek artifact possibly related to the area.

== Demographics ==
Year	Population
1850	266
1928	961
1940	982
1951	1116
1971	1002
1981	1016
2001	1036
2011	904
2021	625

== Notable people ==
- Aristeidis Kollias, Lawyer, Folklorist and Historian.
