= Aristeidis Kollias =

Arvanite Greek lawyer, publicist, and folklorist

Aristeidis Kollias Αριστείδης Κόλλιας NK
- Born: July 8, 1944; Leontari, Greece
- Died: October 1, 2000 (aged 56); Athens, Greece
- Citizenship: Greece
- Occupation: lawyer
- Known for: historical and folklorist research on Arvanites, and other related topics
- Awards: Honour of the Nation (Albania)

Aristeidis P. Kollias (Greek: Αριστείδης Π. Κόλλιας; Albanian: Aristidh Kola, July 8, 1944 – October 1, 2000), was a Greek lawyer, publicist, and folklorist of Arvanite background. He was also president of the Association of the Arvanites Marko Boçari.

== Life ==
Kollias was an Arvanite. He was born in Leontari (old name: Kaskaveli), Boeotia in Central Greece, a village inhabited mainly by Arvanites. Kollias was raised in an Arvanitika speaking family. In 1968 Kollias obtained a jurisprudence degree in Athens, and worked as a lawyer until 1980, when he started to devote his time to studying the linguistic, folkloric and historical traditions of the Arvanites in Greece. Kollias published in Greek his major work Arvanites and the origin of the Greeks (1983) in Greece and was reprinted later in other editions. In 1985 he along with Thanasis Moraitis and Demetrios Lekkas organised the first music concert in Arvanitika held in Greece. During 1995 he founded Thamiras, a publishing house devoted to printing the works of Arvanite and Albanian authors. Kollias authored two books in both Albanian and Greek on the situation in Kosovo regarding massacres and other human rights violations by Slobodan Miloševic of Albanians in the 1990s. In 1996 Kollias relinquished his position as head of the Arvanite league of Greece organisation to devote his time toward Pelasgian studies. From 1997 onward he published a tri-monthly magazine titled Arvanon and together with Kosovar acquaintances used the publication to discuss issues such as the Kosovo conflict. Kollias advocated for the Albanian Kosovar cause by informing the wider public in Greece and also received backlash for his support. In 2000 Kollias was diagnosed with leukemia and died shortly thereafter on 11 September.

Kollias also published a magazine "Besa". He cooperated and maintained connections with the Albanian diaspora and collaborated with Italian Arberesh, Arbëresh of Corsica, Arbanas of Croatia, Albanians of Kosovo, North Macedonia, Ukraine, Turkey and with intellectuals from around the world.

== Recognition ==
Kollias' contribution to the Albanians' cause was recognized by the Albanian government (both former presidents Sali Berisha and Rexhep Mejdani have decorated him for national merits). In 2004 Bajram Rexhepi, then Prime Minister of Kosovo, consigned posthumously to the widow of Kollias a decoration for her spouse'a contributions in the defense of the rights to the people of Kosovo. In addition, the municipality of Skënderaj made Kollias a citizen of honour of the city of the same name. In 2022 he was awarded posthumously the "Honour of the Nation" decoration (Albanian: Dekorata "Nderi i Kombit"), the highest decoration to be given in Albania. In Përmet, a public park was named after Kollias.

== Legacy ==
In 1983, Kollias authored a book titled Arvanites and the Origin of Greeks which he reedited several times and was translated into Albanian in 2002. This book was considered important in rehabilitating the Arvanites in post-dictatorial Greek society. Claims made in the book include that alongside the Greeks, Arvanites shared Pelasgian origins thereby making them the "most authentic Greeks" with their language being closer to Pelasgic while asserting that many Greek words had an Albanian etymology. Under the Albanian context this book has been used by Albanians in Albania and Albanian immigrants in Greece as a tool for their rehabilitation as an ancient and autochthonous population in the Balkans. On the other hand, this theory has been rejected by modern scholars and it's seen as a myth. In Albania, the book has been used to "prove" the precedence of Albanians over Greeks and to rehabilitate Albanians as the oldest rooted population in the Balkans. The book has also been used to legitimise the presence of Albanians in Greece, so as to counter the negative image of their communities and of playing a prominent role in the emergence of ancient Greek civilisation and later in the creation of the Greek state.

== Works ==
- Arvanites and the origin of the Greeks, 1983.
- Language of gods, 1989.
- Arvanitas Union statement
- Corrective Dictionary of Arvanitic words
- Comparative Dictionary of the Albanian Language
- Greece trapped in Milosevic Serbs
- Song of Mercenaries, Greek ancestry
- Myth and Truth
- Third funeral of Marko Bocari

== See also ==
- Albanian communities in Greece
