= Battle of Lalas =

Battle occurring during the Greek War of Independence

- Part of the Greek War of Independence
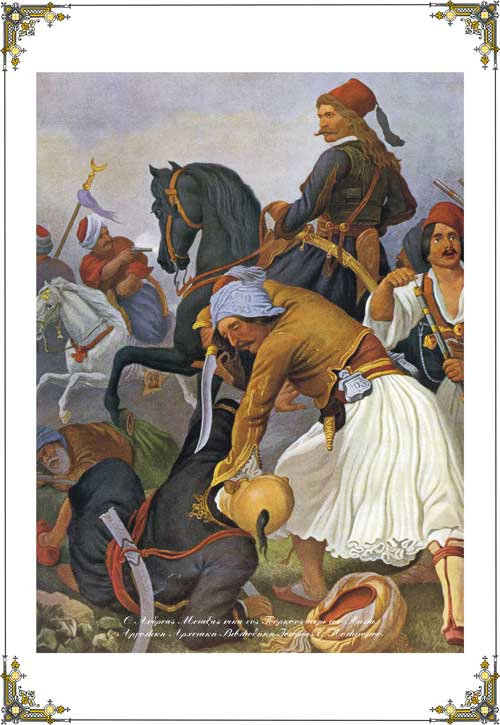
- Andreas Metaxas during the Battle of Lalas by Peter von Hess
Date	9–13 June 1821
Location	Lalas, Morea Eyalet, Ottoman Empire (now Elis, Greece) 37°42′37.57″N 21°43′10.16″E
Result	Greek victory

Belligerents
Greek revolutionaries	Ottoman Empire

Commanders and leaders
Andreas Metaxas (WIA); Konstantinos Metaxas; Dimitris Plapoutas; Georgios Plapoutas †; Dionysios Sembrikos (WIA); Deligiannis; Tzanetos Christopoulos; Georgios Sisinis; Panagiotakis Fotilas; Panagis Messaris	Yousef Serezlis

Strength
850 men	1,200 men 300 Cavalry; Unknown number of Albanian fighters

Casualties and losses
Unknown	Unknown

The Battle of Lalas would prove to be one of the first major skirmishes between the Greek rebels and the Ottoman forces during the Greek War of Independence. The outcome of the battle lay the foundation for the struggle against Ottoman rule in the Peloponnese.

== Background ==
When the Greek Revolution commenced on 21 February 1821, a member of the Filiki Eteria named Andreas Metaxas along with his brother Anastasios and his cousin Konstantinos Metaxas, took it upon themselves to assemble a military contingent of 350 volunteers with two cannons from Kefalonia. Aiming to join the revolutions cause, they managed to board a ship which was equipped with 18 cannons, 50 sailors, and 50 gunmen, and sail to Glarentza which they reached in early May 1821. From there they marched to Manolada where their force was joined by more volunteers including military captains Vilaetis, Sisinis and Plapoutas. The small army's aim was to reach and capture Lalas, an Ottoman Albanian stronghold in the Morea.

Meanwhile in Lalas, the Muslim Albanians, who had already settled in the village for several generations, had already been surrounded by a small force of Greek soldiers under the command of Georgios Plapoutas. The reason for the military presence of the Greeks, came from the fear of the chance that the Muslim-Albanians would join the Ottomans side and threaten Greek rebels and civilians. The Greeks mainly occupied a mountainous terrain surrounding the village, but their position would be very weak and easy to overcome if a battle occurred. Before the vulnerable Greek lines had to face the enemy, Andreas Metaxas' force which now numbered 500 men arrived on 30 May along with four cannons. Metaxas' force had also recruited a number of Zakynthian volunteers under the command of Dionysios Sembrikos while underway to Lalas.

With their numbers replenished and even more volunteers arriving later that same day from Elis and Kalavryta, the Greek force conjured a plan to surround Lalas and capture it from the Muslim-Albanian fighters. Meanwhile, the better organized Ionians trained other volunteers in Western military tactics, while the Greek leaders prepared for an attack. The Ionians proposed a direct strike on the town so that the Muslim-Albanians could be attacked before preparing their defense, however the Peloponnesians suggested waiting for the right opportunity to attack. The absence of a solid plan had turned the makeshift siege into a stalemate which created unrest among the troops and caused the Ionians to threaten to leave the siege altogether. In order to calm things down, the Ionian leaders send Lalas's residents a letter signed by Dionysios Sembrikos, which proposed the option of a peaceful withdrawal from the village. The letter also stated that the only alternative would be an assault on the village in which case all survivors would be handed over to the Peloponnesians. The response sent to the Greeks consisted of a few cherries and two Basbousas for love. The Muslim-Albanians of Lalas did this to save time while refusing to respond to any of the proposals offered by the Greeks, claiming that their leaders were missing. After two days, the Muslim-Albanians sent a reply suggesting that the Ionians leave and that the village, as a sign of friendship, would offer them the means to depart.

== The battle ==
The response from Lalas's inhabitants, ended the possibility of a peaceful solution and caused the Greek leaders to formulate an attack of the village from three points. The Gortynians led by Georgios Plapoutas and Deligiannis alongside the Olympians under the command of Tzanetos Christopoulos, would attack a Muslim-Albanian defense point on the village's right side. The Ionians together with the volunteers from Elis under the command of Andreas and Konstantinos Metaxas would attack Lalas itself. The last force consisting of the remainder of the Elis volunteers led by Georgos Sisinis alongside the Kalavryta forces under Panagiotakis Fotilas would proceed towards the villages of Douka and Loukissa. The attack commenced on 9 June 1821, but only the first attack force advanced due to poor coordination. The Muslim-Albanian fighters immediately spotted the single attacking force and decided to counter attack from their defense position. The defenders defeated the Greeks and Georgios Plapoutas was killed. The remaining forces retreated counting 14 casualties, but inflicting greater losses on the defenders. With the loss of their leader, the Gortynians decided to leave the battle until Georgios' brother Dimitris took his place and managed to boost their morale again.

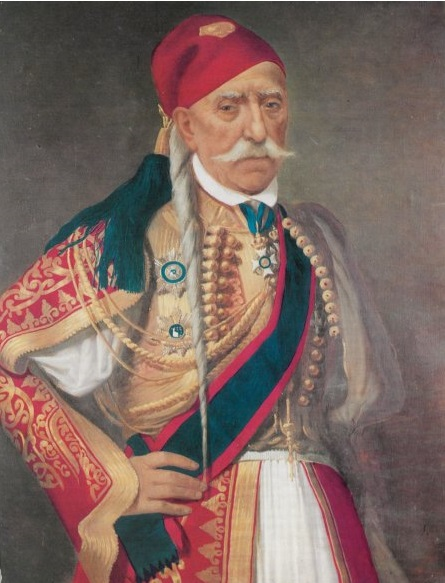
General Dimitris Plapoutas who lost his brother during the battle

Lalas on the Peloponnese

After the first failed attack, various other skirmishes occurred between both sides over several days without clear result. Meanwhile, the defenders began to discuss the possibility of fleeing the village before the Greeks would finally prove victorious and follow through with their threat to hand them over to the Peloponnesians. Ultimately, the defenders decided to ask Ottoman General Yousef Serezlis for help. Serezlis was stationed in Patras and agreed to make his way to Lalas with 1,200 Ottoman troops and 300 Ottoman cavalry. His force arrived at Lalas on 11 June and attacked the Greek lines while the defenders continued to defend the city. This gave Serezlis the opportunity to enter the village and add his forces to those of the city defenders. This escalation prompted the Peloponnesian to suggest a retreat of all Greek forces to a safer distance from the newly arrived and larger Ottoman force. The Ionians however were opposed to the idea and convinced all volunteers to hold their positions while they sought assistance from the Peloponnesian senate in Stemnitsa.

The battle settled into a second stalemate which consumed valuable time but indirectly proved to be an advantage for the Greek forces. The Ottoman forces present at Lalas, were only a small part of the main Ottoman force still based at Patras. With each passing hour Yousef Serezlis grew more and more anxious at the possibility that his main force would be attacked and wiped out at Patras while he remained in Lalas. Not willing to risk the lose of his main force while he sat waiting for a Greek attack, Serezlis took the initiative on 13 June and lead an assault into Greek lines with the intent of capturing the Greek camp and seizing the cannons. The Ottoman attack was met with fierce resistance from the Olympians which ultimately resulted in hand-to-hand combat with the loss of 30 Olympians and an unknown amount of attackers. The Ionians also fiercely resisted the assault, repulsing every one of the Muslim-Albanian attempts at seizing the Greek cannons. The Zakynthian volunteers also managed to hold their ground during the attack, at the cost of many wounded men including their leader Dionysios Sembrikos. Andreas Metaxas was also injured in the battle, receiving gunshot wounds to both of his hands which later earned him the nickname Conte Lalas.

The attackers were unable to capture the Greek camp and ultimately retreated due to their mounting casualties. Unable to defeat the Greeks, the remaining Ottoman and Muslim-Albanian forces decided to withdraw to Patras on 14 June 1821. The village of Lalas was burned to the ground although it is unknown whether the fire was started by the fleeing Muslim-Albanians or the conquering Greeks.

== Aftermath ==
The Greek victory over the Muslim-Albanian fighters was seen as a great achievement and boosted Greek morale among their fighting forces. The Muslim-Albanians of Elis ultimately left, which rendered Lalas and the surrounding areas less vulnerable to Ottoman attacks for the remainder of the war. The Ionians and Zakynthian volunteers were however, not celebrated for their participation in the battle; rather they were prosecuted by the British Administration of the Ionian Islands upon their return home. Many of them were arrested, imprisoned and had their property confiscated.

Other persons of interest who participated in the Battle included: Gennaios Kolokotronis, Panos Kolokotronis and Frantzis Amvrosios.
