= Petros Mitzou =

Petros Mitzou Πέτρος Μήτζου
- Born: Pyrgos, Elis, (now Greece)
- Died: 1825; Greece
- Occupation: Greek revolutionary

Petros Mitzou or Mitsou (Greek: Πέτρος Μήτζου, Γεώργιος Μήτσου) was a Greek revolutionary during the Greek War of Independence. He and his brother Georgios Mitzou fought in the Battle of Lalas in 1821.

He was descended from an old military family. He fought at Chlemoutsi against the Turks.

In July 1825 he was assassinated by Dionysis Diakos.
