= Battle of Petra =

1829 battle of the Greek War of Independence

- Part of the Greek War of Independence
Date	12 September 1829
Location	Petra, Sanjak of Eğriboz, Ottoman Empire (now Boeotia, Greece) 38°22.267′N 23°3.45′E
Result	Greek victory; End of the Greek War of Independence

Belligerents
(Greece) First Hellenic Republic	Ottoman Empire

Commanders and leaders
Demetrios Ypsilantis; Georgios Dyovouniotis; Nikolaos Kriezotis	Aslan Bey (surrendered); Osman Aga

Strength
3,000 (divided into 4 battalions)	7,000 infantry, cavalry, artillery

Casualties and losses
3 dead 12 wounded	~100 dead
- Location of Petra

The Battle of Petra was the final battle fought in the Greek War of Independence.

== Background ==
By the summer of 1829, the Peloponnese, parts of Central Greece and several islands had been liberated by Greek revolutionary forces. A peace treaty between the Sublime Porte and the revolutionaries was imminent but it became apparent that the soon to be created Greek state would be limited to whatever lands had been liberated during the war. In August, Aslan Bey and Osman Aga set off from Athens after leaving behind a small garrison with a force of 7,000 Ottoman Albanians to fight the Russians in Thrace.

== Battle ==
The Greek Army under Demetrios Ypsilantis, which for the first time trained to fight as a regular European army rather than as guerilla bands, awaited Aslan Bey's forces at Petra, a town at a narrow passage in Boeotia between Livadeia and Thebes in order to dispute their passage. On 12 September 1829, the two armies engaged in battle. The Greeks, after a hail of gunfire, charged with swords and drove the Ottoman army into a disorderly retreat. The rest of the Ottoman army, now in danger of being surrounded, also retreated. The Ottoman army was unable to advance and, as a result, concluded a capitulation on 25 September 1829. For both sides the casualties were relatively light. The Greeks suffered three dead and twelve wounded, while the Ottomans lost about one hundred dead.

== Aftermath ==
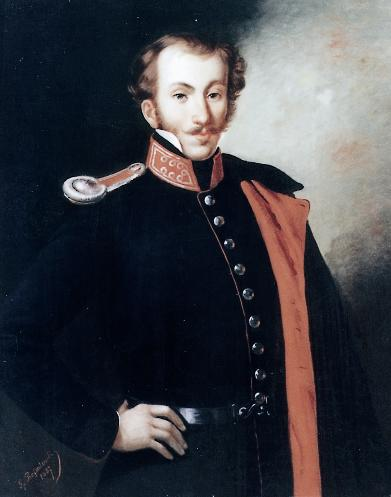
Prince Demetrios Ypsilantis; portrait by Spyridon Prosalentis

In order to follow his orders to march into Thrace, Osman Aga signed a truce the following day with the Greeks. According to the truce, the Ottomans would surrender all lands from Livadeia to the Spercheios River in exchange for safe passage out of Central Greece. This battle was significant as it was the first time the Greeks had fought victoriously as a regular army. It also marked the first time that Ottoman Empire and the Greeks had negotiated on the field of battle. The battle of Petra was the last battle of the Greek War of Independence. Demetrios Ypsilantis ended the war started by his brother, Alexandros Ypsilantis, when the latter had crossed the Pruth River eight and a half years earlier. As George Finlay stresses:

Thus Prince Demetrios Ypsilantis had the honour of terminating the war which his brother had commenced on the banks of the Pruth.
