= Kamatero =

Kamatero Καματερό
- Municipal unit
- Seal

- Location within West Athens regional unit

- Location within Greece
- Coordinates: 38°3.583′N 23°42.717′E
- Country: Greece
- Administrative region: Attica
- Regional unit: West Athens
- Municipality: Agioi Anargyroi-Kamatero

Area
  - Municipal unit: 5.950 km^{2} (2.297 sq mi)
- Elevation: 160 m (520 ft)

Population (2021)
  - Municipal unit: 29,179
  - Municipal unit density: 4,904/km^{2} (12,700/sq mi)
- Time zone: UTC+2 (EET)
  - Summer (DST): UTC+3 (EEST)
- Postal code: 13451
- Area code: 210
- Vehicle registration: Zxx

Kamatero (Greek: Καματερó [kamateˈro]; officially Καματερόν) is a town and a suburb in the central-western part of the Athens agglomeration, Greece. Since the 2011 local government reform it is part of the municipality Agioi Anargyroi-Kamatero, of which it is a municipal unit. It is located about 8 kilometres north of the Athens city centre.

== History ==
=== Antiquity ===
Although the oldest known archaeological finds in Kamatero date to the 4th century BC, the area west of Athens is known to have been inhabited since at least the Bronze Age. Specifically, a Mycenaean tholos tomb has been found in the neighbouring municipality of Acharnai. In classical times, the area of modern Kamatero was under the authority of the polis of Athens. According to Traill, the area of Kamatero was the location of the ancient deme of Eupyridae.

Possibly the oldest archaeological find in Kamatero is an ancient wall on the ridge of Mt. Aigaleos above the modern settlement. As described by McCredie, the wall is 0.60 to 0.90 m. thick, and "seldom preserved to the height of half a metre". McCredie considers it to be a military fieldwork, and, given that it runs to the southeast of the ridge's crest, deems it to be meant as a defence towards that direction, i.e. the direction of Athens. Thus, and also due to "its extremely light construction", he concludes that it was built as a temporary defence for a force invading Athens. He notes that "it might represent the last easily defencible point before entering the plain of Athens itself". McCredie speculates that the wall was built to block the relatively easy route through Mt. Aigaleos (and on towards Eleusis and Boeotia) that passes at that point. As far as the dating of the wall is concerned, McCredie concedes that it is impossible to be independently dated. However, he believes it was built on the occasion of the same invasion as two other walls in Attica: one in the Thriasian plain, and another, more famous one (known as the Dema) bridging the gap between Mt. Aigaleos and Mt. Parnes. The Dema can be independently dated to the second half of the 4th century BC, or possibly the first half of the 3rd. Thus, McCredie considers it likely that the Kamatero wall also dates to the 4th or 3rd century BC.

=== Medieval and Ottoman era ===
The place name 'Kamatero' does not appear in any Byzantine records. However, it has been proposed that the name of the settlement derives from the prominent Byzantine Kamateros family. Proponents of this theory fail to identify a specific member of the family after whom the settlement would have been named; for instance, according to Sarris, the placename is derived "from a Byzantine family name by some Kamateros". An alternative view has been proposed by Fourikis: he proposes that the name is derived from the common noun καματερό (/kamate'ro/), meaning "a plot of hard land that is tilled with toil". He notes that similar place names exist in Rhodes (Kamateri) and Salamis (Kamatero), noting especially of the latter that it is a location known for its infertile ground. Thus, he concludes that the place name is derived from a property of the soil, as opposed to the house of Kamateros. To reinforce his position, Fourikis notes that (as previously noted) the place name Kamatero is not attested in any Byzantine era documents. He concedes however that the placename may possibly be derived from a modern family name Kamateros, which may in its turn be Byzantine in origin.

There is little that can be said about Kamatero, as separate from the rest of Attica, during the medieval and Ottoman era. One thing of note is that, starting from some point in time that is difficult to establish with certainty, and lasting up until the modern era, the Greek language was supplanted by Arvanitic as the primary means of communication in Kamatero (as well as the surrounding areas). This is supported by census data from the 19th and 20th centuries. It has been noted that Arvanitic remained the language of everyday communication in Kamatero at least until the interbellum years.

=== From the Greek War of Independence and through the 19th century ===
The first known reference to the settlement, using the name Kamatero, is from the Memoirs of General Makrygiannis, written in the 19th century. The settlement is mentioned in connection to the Battle of Kamatero, which took place in 1827, at which time a village by that name was already extant in the area. The battle itself was part of the Greek War of Independence, and ended in a Turkish victory, largely due to a poor choice of terrain by one of the Greek commanders, Vasos Mavrovouniotis. It was also the only engagement in the war of Colonel Denis Bourbaki, who was beheaded by the Turks after the engagement. The outcome of the battle had considerable impact on the course of the siege of the Acropolis then ongoing by the Turks.

After Greek independence, and during the reign of King Otto, Kamatero is first mentioned in a royal decree of 1836, proclaiming it a part of the municipality of Chastia. In 1840, by a new royal decree, it was made part of the municipality of Fyli. In 1845, it was transferred again, this time to the municipality of Acharnai. In 1853, Kamatero is described by Ragavis as a settlement of 29 households and 123 people, producing grain and wine.

Kamatero exhibited a steady growth of population during this period. It is mentioned as being inhabited by 103 people in 1846. As already noted, it is described in 1853 as having a population of 123. By the first available census, in 1879, the population had risen to 199. This trend continued throughout the rest of the century: the population rose to 246 by 1889 and 264 by 1896.

As has been noted, the main language spoken in Kamatero up until World War II was Arvanitic. This is further reinforced by the 1879 census, according to which, in the municipality of Acharnai, to which Kamatero still belonged at the time, out of a total of 3,415 people, 2,711 did not speak Greek.

=== 20th century ===
The 1907 census confirms the continued strong presence of Arvanitic in the area of Kamatero in the early 20th century. According to this, in the municipality of Acharnai (of which Kamatero still formed part), of a total of 5,853 people, 3,577 spoke Greek, 2,272 spoke Albanian, and 4 spoke another language. The great increase in the proportion of Greek speaking people however, as compared to the 1879 census, is notable. In addition, the 1907 census also confirmed the continued increase of the population: by 1907, it had risen to 285.

There is a World War II era description of Kamatero in the book 21 Battalion, by author J. Cody. The 21st Battalion was a New Zealand infantry battalion temporarily stationed in Kamatero in spring 1941. The description given by the author is of a "pleasant tree-studded area". It is repeatedly termed a "village", and, upon arrival, soldiers of the 21st chanced upon the villagers harvesting wheat. The battalion's encampment is characterised as "rolling country dotted with olive trees". The above description makes it clear that Kamatero at that time was still a small agricultural settlement.

Major population influx only started in the 1950s, resulting in wide-scale urbanisation. By now, urban development has replaced most of the farmlands and forests, and about two-thirds of the settlement are residential areas. According to the Association for the Development of West Athens, in 1981 only an estimated 2.8% of the economically active population was employed in the primary sector of industry. More recent figures are unavailable, but probably lower.

More recently, Athens was struck by a major earthquake on September 7, 1999. Kamatero was very close to the epicentre, and several houses were heavily damaged. There were no casualties, but the homeless were in the hundreds range.

== Geography ==
The municipal unit has an area of 5.950 km^{2}. The western part of the municipal unit is dominated by Poikilo mountain. This forms part of the Aigaleo mountain range, which extends southwest to the Saronic Gulf. The remaining part of the municipality is characterised by a rolling, hilly landscape. Up to the mid-20th century, the area was made up of farmlands and some forests dominated its northern part.

After that point, urban development replaced much of the farmlands. Today, about two-thirds of the land are residential areas. Empty space today can be found mostly in the western part, on Poikilo mountain. This is a rocky mountain, consisting mostly of limestone, dotted with the occasional pine. There are also some last patches of forest to be found there, especially at the feet of the mountain.

The Antonis Tritsis Metropolitan Park lies to the southeast of the municipality. The park is considered to be "one of the last wildlife reserves in the Athens urban environment", and it covers "more than 100,000 m2". It consists of water courses, evergreen and coniferous trees, reed beds and farmland, and attracts "many species of birds and animal throughout the year." Specifically, "members of the Hellenic Ornithological Society have been monitoring birds at the Park and have recorded 147 different species". While the Park technically lies outside the municipality's boundaries, its influence on its microclimate is evident. Furthermore, as it is directly on the municipality's boundaries, Kamatero municipality takes an active part in its administration, along with the neighbouring municipalities of Ilion and Agioi Anargyroi.

== Government and politics ==
=== Administration ===
Kamatero is a part of the municipality Agioi Anargyroi-Kamatero within the West Athens regional unit, itself a part of the Attica region.

Kamatero itself is not further subdivided into smaller administrative sectors. While there are some traditional neighbourhoods in Kamatero, they have no administrative function. Besides, the delineation between the various neighbourhoods has become somewhat blurred, as what were essentially separate settlements up to a few decades ago have now been merged into a single building complex, itself part of the larger Athens metropolitan complex.

=== Voting trends ===
Kamatero voters exhibit a long trend of supporting leftist and centre-leftist parties to a greater extent than the national average. After the military dictatorship of 1967–1974, Kamatero has almost exclusively elected left-wing mayors, with the exception of the 1974–1978 period, right after the junta. Kamatero was one of the few Greek municipalities to elect a communist mayor in 1978 when Vasilis Katsaros won. He was reelected in the 1982 and 1986 elections and remained in office until 1990 (although he later switched from the Communist Party of Greece (KKE) to the radical leftist Synaspismos). Following 1990, and up to 2007, mayors supported by the socialist PASOK party have consistently been elected: Panagiotis Trakas (1990–1998), Dr Nikolaos Stenos [2002–2005 (resigned)], Nikitas Kamarinopoulos (replacing Dr Stenos 2005–2006 and in his own right 2006–present). The only brake from PASOK domination came during the 1998–2002 period, when Christoforos Danakos was elected under the auspices of the center-leftist DIKKI party (itself a PASOK splinter).

Furthermore, leftist parties generally pole better in Kamatero than their national average. This is especially true of the Communist Party, which in the latest legislative elections (2004) polled 11.14% of the vote in Kamatero, as opposed to its national average of 5.90%. PASOK polled 41.94% in Kamatero, as opposed to its national average of 40.55%, while Synaspismos and DIKKI also polled better than their national average (3.69% and 2.94% respectively, as opposed to their national averages of 3.26% and 1.79% respectively). By contrast, the centre-right New Democracy party, that won the national election, came in a distant second in Kamatero, polling 35.24% as opposed to its national average of 45.26%. However, it is noteworthy that the far-right Popular Orthodox Rally (LAOS) party also polled better in Kamatero, gaining 3.68% of the vote as opposed to its national average of 2.19%.

== Demographics ==
The area is mainly made up of urban areas, as residential areas account for about two-thirds of the municipality. Kamatero is not divided into administrative districts, however there are some traditional neighbourhoods: the Centre, Attalos, Aghios Trifonas and Gerovouno. Construction regulations vary throughout the municipality, but most houses are up to two floors.

The influx of population from the 1950s onwards mostly consisted of low-income individuals. Furthermore, Kamatero has a distinct working-class character, as in 1981 56.7% of the economically active population was employed in the secondary sector of industry, while 36.3% was employed in the tertiary sector. The primary sector accounted only for 2.8% of the population. Kamatero is considered to have potentials for further development, as it has one of the largest reserves of building space in Attica. Furthermore, it has been called one of the fastest growing municipalities in Attica.

=== Population ===
As can be seen from the table below, the population has been on a steady increase from 1971 onwards. What should be noted, however, is that the actual population is likely to be significantly higher than these official figures. This is because a lot of Greeks remain registered in their places of origins, while residing in various other municipalities, mostly in the Athens area. This is evident from the fact that in 1989, the official population would have ranged somewhere between 16,000 and 19,000 residents, as can be seen from the table. However, according to the public power corporation of Greece's estimate for that year, based on statistical sheets it asked its consumers to fill in, the actual population was 25,515.

Year	Population
1846	103
1853	123
1879	199
1889	246
1896	264
1907	285
1971	11,382
1981	15,593
1991	18,759
2001	22,234
2011	28,361
2021	29,179

== Education ==
Kamatero has 8 elementary schools, 3 lower-level secondary schools, and 2 upper-level secondary schools (high schools), as well as a vocational school. Most high school graduates enroll in the universities and technical colleges of Athens or other Greek cities.

== See also ==
- List of municipalities of Attica
- Municipalities and communities of Greece
