= Battle of Kamatero =

1827 battle in the Greek War of Independence

- Part of the Greek War of Independence
Date	27 January 1827 (O.S.)
Location	Kamatero, Sanjak of Eğriboz, Ottoman Empire (now Attica, Greece)
Result	Ottoman victory

Belligerents
(Greece) First Hellenic Republic	Ottoman Empire

Commanders and leaders
Konstantinos Bourbakis †; Vasos Mavrovouniotis; Panagiotakis Notaras	Reşid Mehmed Pasha

Strength
3,500	2,000 infantry 600 cavalry 2 cannons

Casualties and losses
300–500	Unknown

The Battle of Kamatero was an armed conflict during the Greek revolution between the Greek forces under the command of the Greek ex officer of the French army, Colonel Denis Bourbaki and the Ottoman forces led by Reşid Mehmed Pasha. The battle ended with the decisive victory of the Ottomans on the night of 27 January 1827 (O.S.) in Kamatero, Greece (near Menidi).

== Before the battle ==
In late 1826, the retired Colonel of the French army Constantin Denis Bourbaki (Dionysios Vourvachis), after getting permission from the Greek Government in Nafplio, formed a force battalion of 800-1000 men, using his own money but also an amount that was offered by philhellenic clubs of Europe. During the last days of 1826, the battalion landed in Loutraki to strengthen Georgios Karaiskakis army, but after government orders they moved to Eleusina to help Vasos Mavrovouniotis. A few days later, Panagiotakis Notaras arrived there as well, with a force of 1200 men. From Eleusina, Vourvachis and the two other chieftains, with united forces moved to Menidi, where on 22 January they prevailed in battle against the Ottomans. On 26 January, the combined force of approximately 3500 men camped in Kamatero.

== Battle ==
The battle helped to distract Reshid Pasha's forces from engaging the armies of British general Thomas Gordon while they were completing their defensive fortifications on the hill of Munychia. On 27 January 1827, 2000 Ottoman foot soldiers and 600 horsemen, covered by artillery, attacked under the command of Reshid Pasha against the Greeks, who had split their forces in two. Vourvachis had lined his men on the field, while Mavrovouniotis and Notaras held positions at the foot of the adjacent mountain, a third of a mile afar.

More specifically, the artillery of Reshid Pasha attacked Mavrovouniotis and Notaras, while at the same time the infantry and cavalry of the Ottomans attacked the forces of Vourvachis on the field, who formed the vanguard. Despite the resistance of Vourvachis and his men, they were defeated, especially because of the Ottoman cavalry. The forces of Mavrovouniotis and Notaras were defeated as well and were forced to a disorderly retreat, most of them fleeing to Salamis Island, while the Ottomans chased them.

== Results and evaluation ==
The battle ended in a crushing defeat of the Greek forces. From the rebels’ side 300–350 fighters were killed, including two French philhellene officers, the surgeon of the army and Dionysios Vourvachis, the head of whom was cut off and sent by Reshid Pasha as loot to the sultan Mahmud II.

According to Trikoupis, the eve of the battle there was disagreement between the leaders of the Greek army about the tactics that they should follow. Trikoupis blames Vourvachis, while Makriyannis believes that Mavrovouniotis is responsible, arguing that placing the troops in such a weak position was his initiative. Moreover, he expresses his doubts about the fighting abilities of the men that Vourvachis had enlisted.

== Bibliography ==
- Finlay, George. History of the Greek Revolution. W. Blackwood and Sons, 1861 (Harvard University).
- Koutsonikas, Lambros. Γενική ιστορία της ελληνικής επαναστάσεως, vol.2 (Β΄). Αθήνα: Ευαγγέλιμος Δ. Καρακατζάνης, p. 323-327.
- Kremos, Georgios (1879). Χρονολόγια της Ελληνικής Ιστορίας : προς χρήσιν πάντος φιλομαθούς, ιδία δε των εν τοις γυμνασίοις μαθητών. Αθήνα: Δημήτριος Ιασεμίδης, p. 28.
- Trikoupis, Spyridon. Ιστορία της Ελληνικής Επαναστάσεως, Έκδοσις τρίτη επιθεωρηθείσα και διορθωθείσα υπ' αυτού του συγγραφέως, εκ του τυπογραφείου της Ώρας, Εν Αθήναις 1888
- Vakalopoulos, Apostolos. Ιστορία του Νέου Ελληνισμού, vol.7 (Ζ'), Θεσσαλονίκη, 1986
