= Nikolaos Kriezotis =

Greek general (c. 1785 – 1853)

- Νικόλαος Κριεζώτης
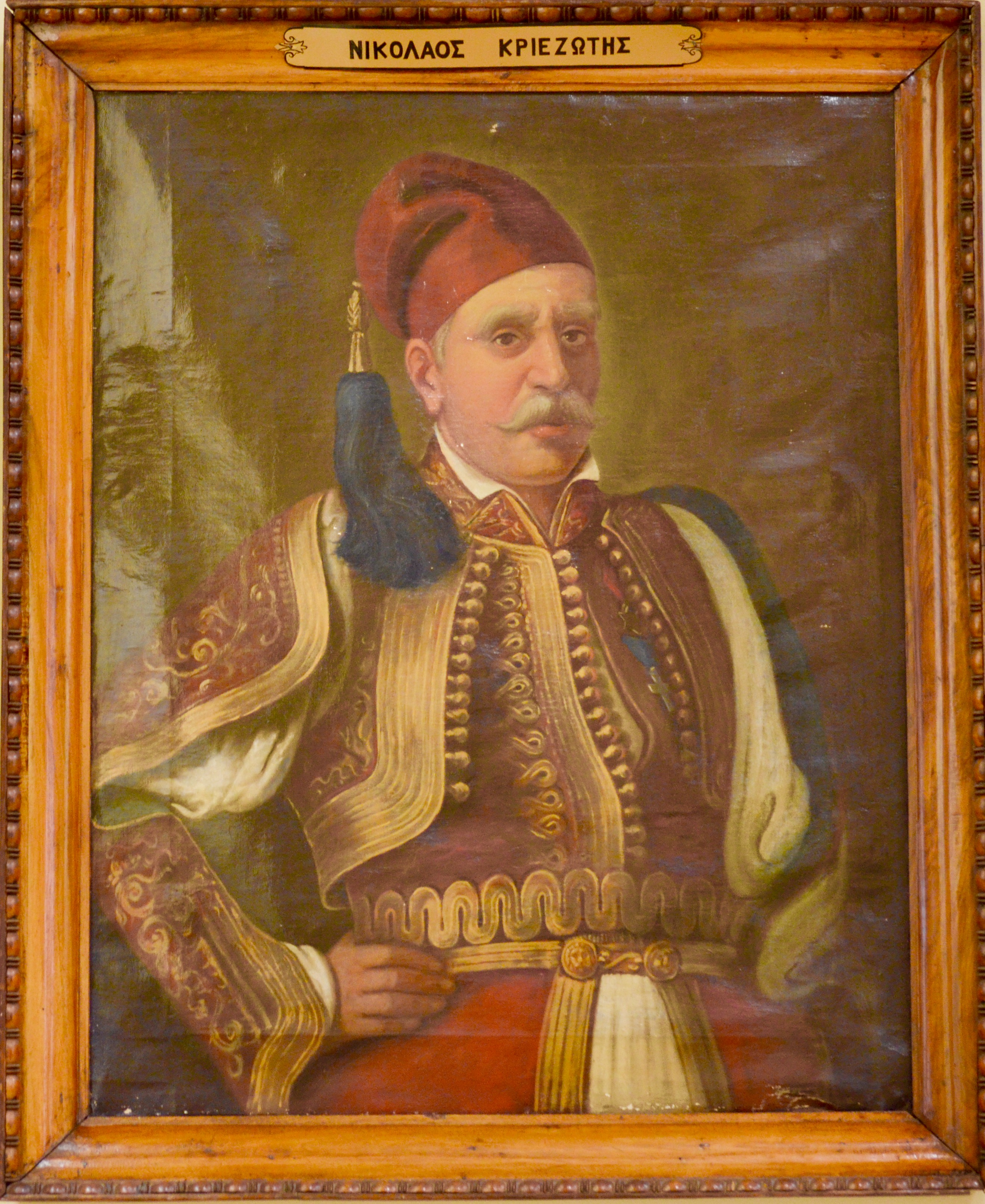
- A portrait of Nikolaos Kriezotis at the National Historical Museum of Athens.
- Born: c. 1785; Argyro, Sanjak of Eğriboz, Ottoman Empire (now Greece)
- Died: 1853; Smyrna, Aidin Eyalet, Ottoman Empire (now Turkey)
- Military career
- Allegiance: First Hellenic Republic; Kingdom of Greece
- Branch: Hellenic Army
- Rank: General
- Conflicts: Greek War of Independence; First Siege of the Acropolis; First Siege of Missolonghi; Battle of Petra; 3 September 1843 Revolution
- Other work: Member of the Russian Party

Nikolaos Kriezotis (Greek: Νικόλαος Κριεζώτης; c. 1785 – 1853) was a Greek soldier who served as a leader during the Greek War of Independence in Euboea.

== Biography ==
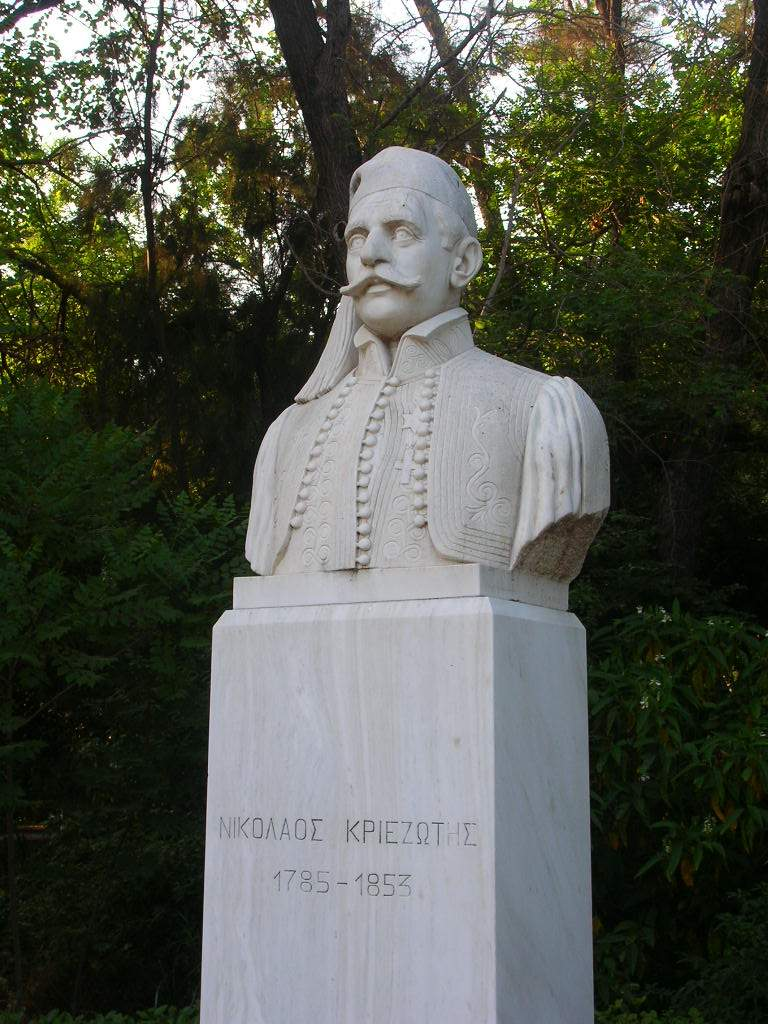
A bust of Kriezotis at Pedion tou Areos.

An Arvanite, Kriezotis was general officer in the Greek revolutionary army and is credited with being one of the leaders of the 1822 First Siege of Missolonghi, fought against the Ottomans, who were led by Omer Vrioni. Kriezotis had earlier participated in the siege of Athens reinforcing the siege of the Acropolis. In 1829 he participated in the Battle of Petra, the last battle of the Greek Revolution. After the revolution he joined the Russian Party.

He led the Revolution of 1843 in Euboea and the following year was elected a delegate to the First National Assembly and to the first Parliament after that.

Kriezotis then withdrew to Smyrna, where he died in 1853.
