= Ypsilanti, Georgia =

Unincorporated community in Georgia, U.S.

Coordinates: 32°44′33″N 84°24′48″W

Ypsilanti (/ˌɪpsɪˈlænti/ IP-sil-AN-tee) is an unincorporated community in Talbot County, in the U.S. state of Georgia.

== History ==
The community's name is a transfer from Ypsilanti, Michigan, itself named for Demetrios Ypsilantis, a leader of the Greek War of Independence. Variant names are "Red Bone" (after its militia district) and "Ypsillanti". A post office called Ypsilanti was established in 1883, and remained in operation until 1916. Once having two cotton gins, it “is now (2010) merely a crossroads with a reported five residences."
