= Thespies =

Village in Boeotia, Greece

Thespies Θεσπιές
- Municipal unit
- Location within the regional unit

- Location within Greece
- Coordinates: 38°18′N 23°09′E
- Country: Greece
- Administrative region: Central Greece
- Regional unit: Boeotia
- Municipality: Aliartos-Thespies

Area
  - Municipal unit: 108.152 km^{2} (41.758 sq mi)
  - Community: 12.725 km^{2} (4.913 sq mi)

Population (2021)
  - Municipal unit: 3,386
  - Municipal unit density: 31.31/km^{2} (81.09/sq mi)
  - Community: 905
  - Community density: 71.1/km^{2} (184/sq mi)
- Time zone: UTC+2 (EET)
  - Summer (DST): UTC+3 (EEST)
- Vehicle registration: ΒΙ

Thespies (Greek: Θεσπιές; before 1934: Ερημόκαστρο Erimókastro) is a village in Boeotia, Greece. A former municipality, which included the village, shared the same name. Since the 2011 local government reform it is part of the municipality Aliartos-Thespies, of which it is a municipal unit. Population 3,386 (2021). The municipal unit has an area of 108.152 km^{2}, the community 12.725 km^{2}.

Thespies is named after the ancient city of Thespiae. Thespies or then Erimokastro used to be an Arvanite settlement of 1,095 people in 1907.
