= Aliartos =

Town in Boeotia, Greece

Aliartos Αλίαρτος
- Municipal unit
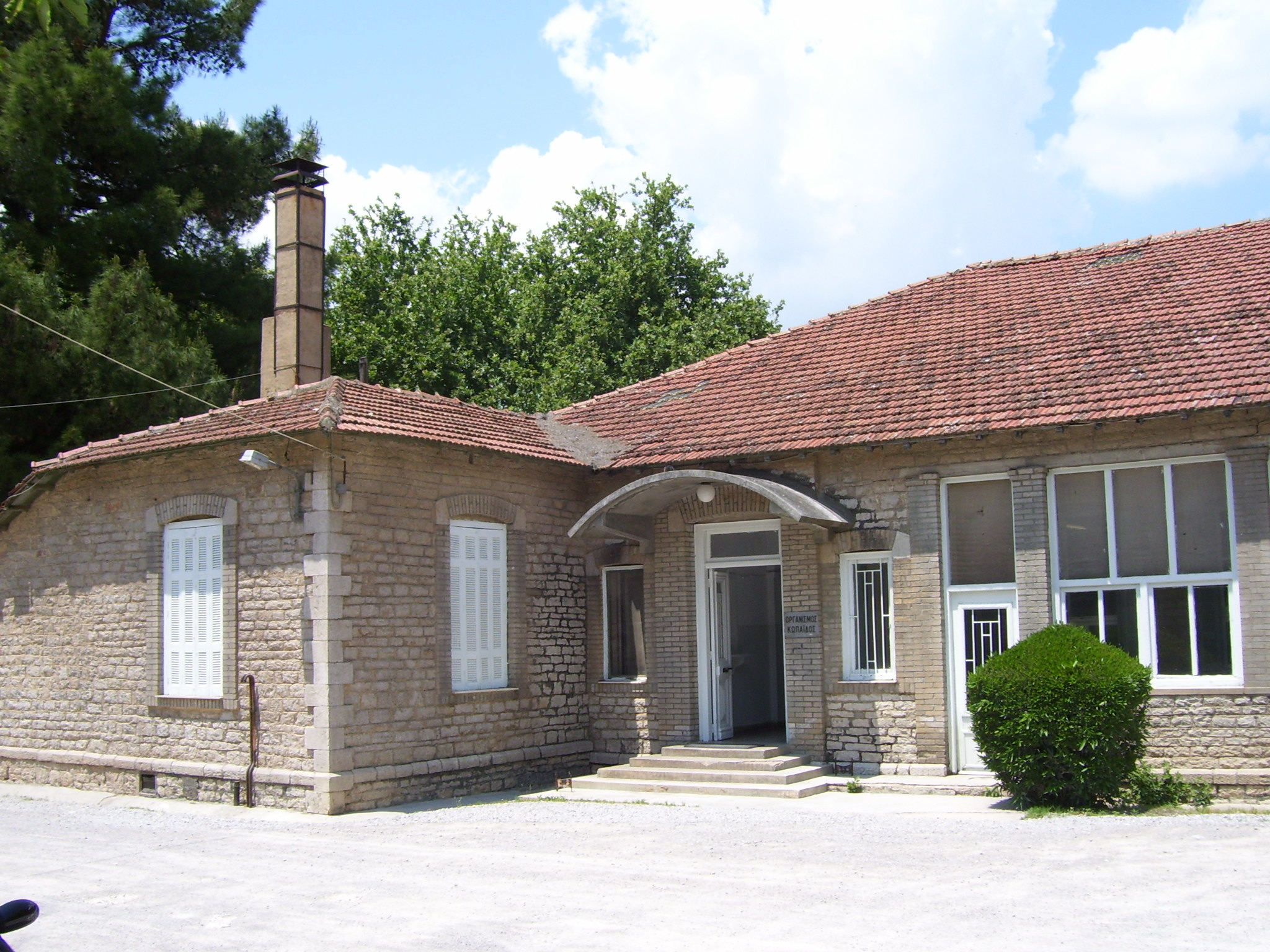
- The Copais company building in Aliartos

- Location within the regional unit

- Location within Greece
- Coordinates: 38°22.3′N 23°06.3′E
- Country: Greece
- Administrative region: Central Greece
- Regional unit: Boeotia
- Municipality: Aliartos-Thespies

Area
  - Municipal unit: 148.355 km^{2} (57.280 sq mi)
  - Community: 66.077 km^{2} (25.512 sq mi)
- Highest elevation: 195 m (640 ft)
- Lowest elevation: 100 m (330 ft)

Population (2021)
  - Municipal unit: 5,388
  - Municipal unit density: 36.32/km^{2} (94.06/sq mi)
  - Community: 4,385
  - Community density: 66.36/km^{2} (171.9/sq mi)
- Time zone: UTC+2 (EET)
  - Summer (DST): UTC+3 (EEST)
- Postal code: 320 01
- Area code: +30-2368
- Vehicle registration: ΒΙ
- Website: www.aliartos.gov.gr

Aliartos (Greek: Αλίαρτος) is a small town and former municipality in the Boeotia regional unit, Greece, at 109 kilometres from Athens and about 18 kilometres west of Thebes. Since 2011, it is part of the municipality Aliartos-Thespies. The 2021 census recorded 5,388 residents in the municipal unit of Aliartos and 4,385 in the town of Aliartos. Its name comes from the ancient city of Haliartus.

== History ==
The modern town of Aliartos is a recent creation. In the early 19th century, the site was occupied by two small agricultural settlements, Moulki (Μούλκι) and Krimpas (Κριμπάς). In 1835, the name of ancient Haliartus was revived for the newly established municipality which encompassed these settlements. Krimpas was renamed to Aliartos in June 1919, but in 1951 the settlement was disbanded and the name was transferred in July 1953 to Moulki. The names of Moulki and Krimpas survive as quarters of the new town.

== Geography ==
Aliartos lies in the center of the Kopais (Kωπαΐδα) plain. The municipality of Aliartos covers an area of 256.507 km^{2} (99.038 sq mi), the municipal unit of Aliartos is 148.355 km^{2} (57.280 sq mi) and the community is 66.077 km^{2} (25.512 sq mi).

=== Climate ===
Under the Köppen climate classification, Aliartos has a hot-summer Mediterranean climate (Csa), with wet, cool winters and dry, hot summers.

Climate data for Aliartos (1967–2001)
Month	Jan	Feb	Mar	Apr	May	Jun	Jul	Aug	Sep	Oct	Nov	Dec	Year
Mean daily maximum °C (°F)	11.5 (52.7)	12.9 (55.2)	15.6 (60.1)	20.4 (68.7)	25.8 (78.4)	30.9 (87.6)	32.4 (90.3)	31.9 (89.4)	28.6 (83.5)	22.5 (72.5)	17.2 (63.0)	13.1 (55.6)	21.9 (71.4)
Daily mean °C (°F)	7.1 (44.8)	8.3 (46.9)	10.7 (51.3)	15.3 (59.5)	20.7 (69.3)	25.7 (78.3)	27.3 (81.1)	26.4 (79.5)	22.6 (72.7)	17.0 (62.6)	12.2 (54.0)	8.7 (47.7)	16.8 (62.3)
Mean daily minimum °C (°F)	2.9 (37.2)	3.6 (38.5)	5.0 (41.0)	8.1 (46.6)	12.2 (54.0)	16.0 (60.8)	17.9 (64.2)	17.4 (63.3)	14.5 (58.1)	11.0 (51.8)	7.2 (45.0)	4.4 (39.9)	10.0 (50.0)
Average rainfall mm (inches)	80.5 (3.17)	75.2 (2.96)	62.4 (2.46)	41.8 (1.65)	28.6 (1.13)	14.3 (0.56)	7.0 (0.28)	15.4 (0.61)	16.7 (0.66)	68.3 (2.69)	73.0 (2.87)	99.3 (3.91)	582.5 (22.95)
Average rainy days	12.4	12.1	11.2	8.3	6.2	3.5	2.2	2.4	3.3	8.4	9.4	12.4	91.8
Average relative humidity (%)	75.2	71.8	67.6	60.1	56.1	47.8	47.6	50.9	56.2	68.0	74.3	75.9	62.6
Source: HNMS

== See also ==
- Tower of Aliartos
- List of settlements in Boeotia
