= Constantin Denis Bourbaki =

Greek officer in the French military

Colonel Constantin Denis Bourbaki
- Native name: Διονύσιος Βούρβαχης
- Born: Dionysios Bourbakis c. 1787; Kefalonia, Republic of Venice (now Greece)
- Died: 8 February 1827 Kamatero, Sanjak of Eğriboz, Ottoman Empire (now Greece)
- Allegiance: First French Empire (Greece) First Hellenic Republic
- Branch: Imperial French Army; Hellenic Army
- Rank: Colonel
- Conflicts: Napoleonic Wars; War of the Seventh Coalition; Waterloo Campaign; Battle of Waterloo; Greek War of Independence; Second Siege of the Acropolis; Battle of Kamatero (executed)
- Children: Charles-Denis Bourbaki (son)
- Other work: Aide-de-camp to Joseph Bonaparte

Dionysios Vourvachis (Greek: Διονύσιος Βούρβαχης; 1787 – 8 February 1827), also known as Constantin Denis Bourbaki, was a Greek officer educated in France, and serving in the French military. He fought in the last phases of the Napoleonic Wars, and after 1825, joined the Greek War of Independence. He was killed in 1827 following his defeat at the Battle of Kamatero. He is the father of French General Charles Denis Bourbaki.

== Biography ==
=== Early life ===
Bourbaki was born on the island of Kefalonia in 1787. He was the son of Konstantinos-Sotirios Vourvachis, a Greek of Cretan extraction who was forced to relocate to Kephalonia. Thanks to his father's influence with Napoleon, he was able to join the military academy at Fontainebleau (which was later relocated to St Cyr). He graduated from the academy in 1804.

=== Career under Napoleon and retirement ===
Following his graduation, he took part in several conflicts of the Napoleonic Wars, and was appointed aide-de-camp to Joseph Bonaparte, who had been appointed King of Spain by Napoleon. However, following the Emperor's exile to Elba, he resigned his commission in the military. After Napoleon's return to France, he resumed active duty with the rank of colonel, but he resigned again after the defeat at Waterloo and the Bourbon Restoration in 1815. In the following years, he left France for Spain due to a duel, but was expelled soon afterwards for his anti-monarchist views. He retired to the town of Pau, in the French Pyrenees.

=== Service during the Greek War of Independence ===
Following the outbreak of the Greek Revolution in 1821, Bourbaki initiated contact with the philhellenic groups of Paris. In 1825, he was involved in an attempt to secure the Greek throne for Louis, Duke of Nemours, second son of Louis-Philippe, Duke of Orléans. In 1826, he was sent to Greece as the head of a number of French volunteers, and intended to place himself under the command of Georgios Karaiskakis.

He received a negative reaction from the anglophile government in Nafplion. Nevertheless, he recruited a body of 80 men at his own expense, and joined Greek chieftains Vasos Mavrovouniotis and Panagiotis Notaras. The three bodies advanced in unison into Attica in January, 1827, with the intent of relieving the Greek garrison besieged at the Acropolis of Athens.

The force, numbering about 500 men in total, and under the command of Bourbaki, advanced to Eleusis in February, and faced the Ottomans at the Battle of Kamatero on 8 February (27 January in the Julian calendar). Despite opposite opinions by the Greek chieftains, Bourbaki insisted on facing the Ottomans in an organised formation. His force was defeated by the Ottoman cavalry, losing over 300 men. He was captured, and beheaded later the same day.

== Memorials ==
Vourvachis street in Kamatero is named after Bourbaki in honour of his heroic death on the town's premises. Moreover, the municipality has occasionally held games in his honour, called the Vourvachia (Βουρβάχεια), with varying success.

== See also ==
- Nicolas Bourbaki
