= Two Towers of Mytikas =

Coordinates: 38.4447°N 23.6710°E

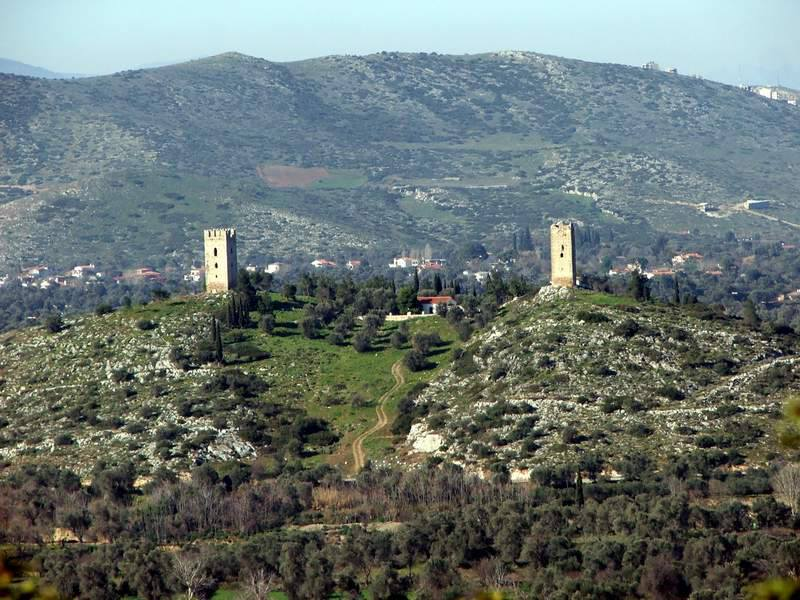
The Two Towers of Mytikas

The Two Towers of Mytikas are two Frankish-era towers in Mytikas, Euboea, built according to the models of fortification buildings of the 11th century in Western Europe. They are very close to each other (less than two hundred metres) and between them are the church of Agia Paraskevi and the cemetery church of Agios Athanasios. Their close proximity is unusual, and the only explanation proposed is that they were shared between members of the same family.

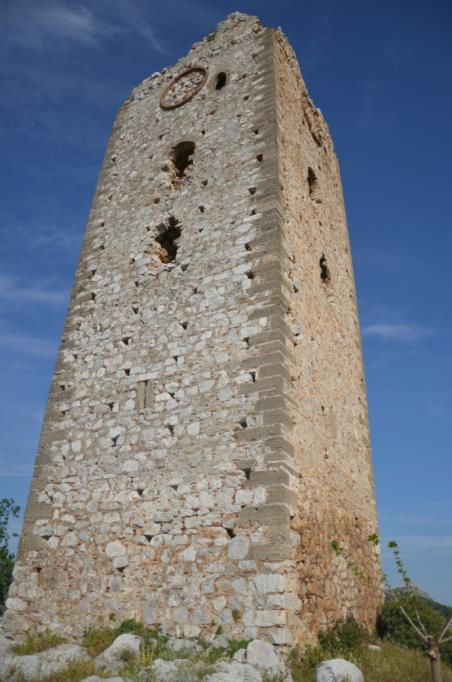
First tower

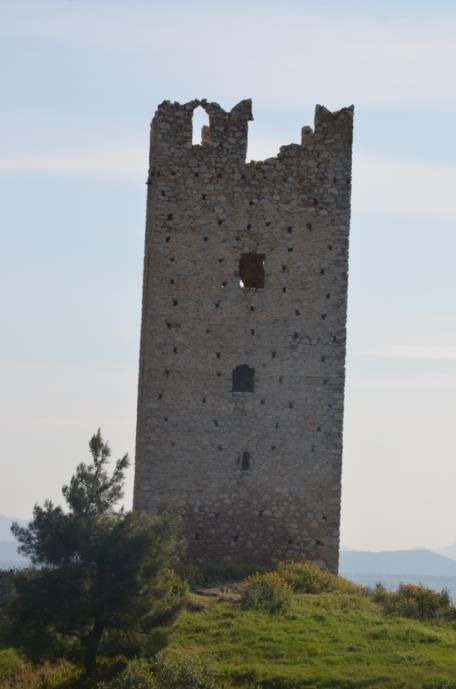
Second tower

Geographically, the towers are located in the Lelantine Plain, on a rocky but smooth twin-peaked hill. At its base runs the Lilas river and it is said that apart from their defensive purpose, the towers controlled the river waters for the better water supply of Chalkida and the fertile plain. It is likely that in 1429 one of the twin towers was inhabited by the 'river master' (potamarcho di Lilanto, an official who supervised the flow of water. The towers have a direct line of sight to the castle of Fylla, which is very close by, and also to the tower of Vasiliko, which formed part of the same defensive system.

== Technical characteristics ==
The towers are 18 metres high. The first one's sides measure 6.10 by 6.10 metres, and its north-east and north-west sides are built on a rock. Its entrance is 6 meters high. The northwest side has one large and one small window and a light gun port. The entrance is on the northeast side where there is also a small window and a vertical gun port. The masonry is of claystone blocks carefully placed and bonded with lime mortar. The cinder blocks give strength and stability. The cornerstones are well-formed and rectangular. They are parallel-line capstones that have been transported there from a coastal area and their serrated placement gives strength to the building.

The second one has a larger volume and sides of 7.5 metres. It is also built with claystone and its entrance is on the west side and is arched with a small arched window next to it. In the lower part it has doorways. The M-shaped battlements give it a martial character.

== Bibliography ==
- Vasilatos, Nikos Sen. (1992). Balder, Athens, ISBN 960-85180-1-6.
