= Tower of Aliartos =

Coordinates: 38°22′04″N 23°07′12″E

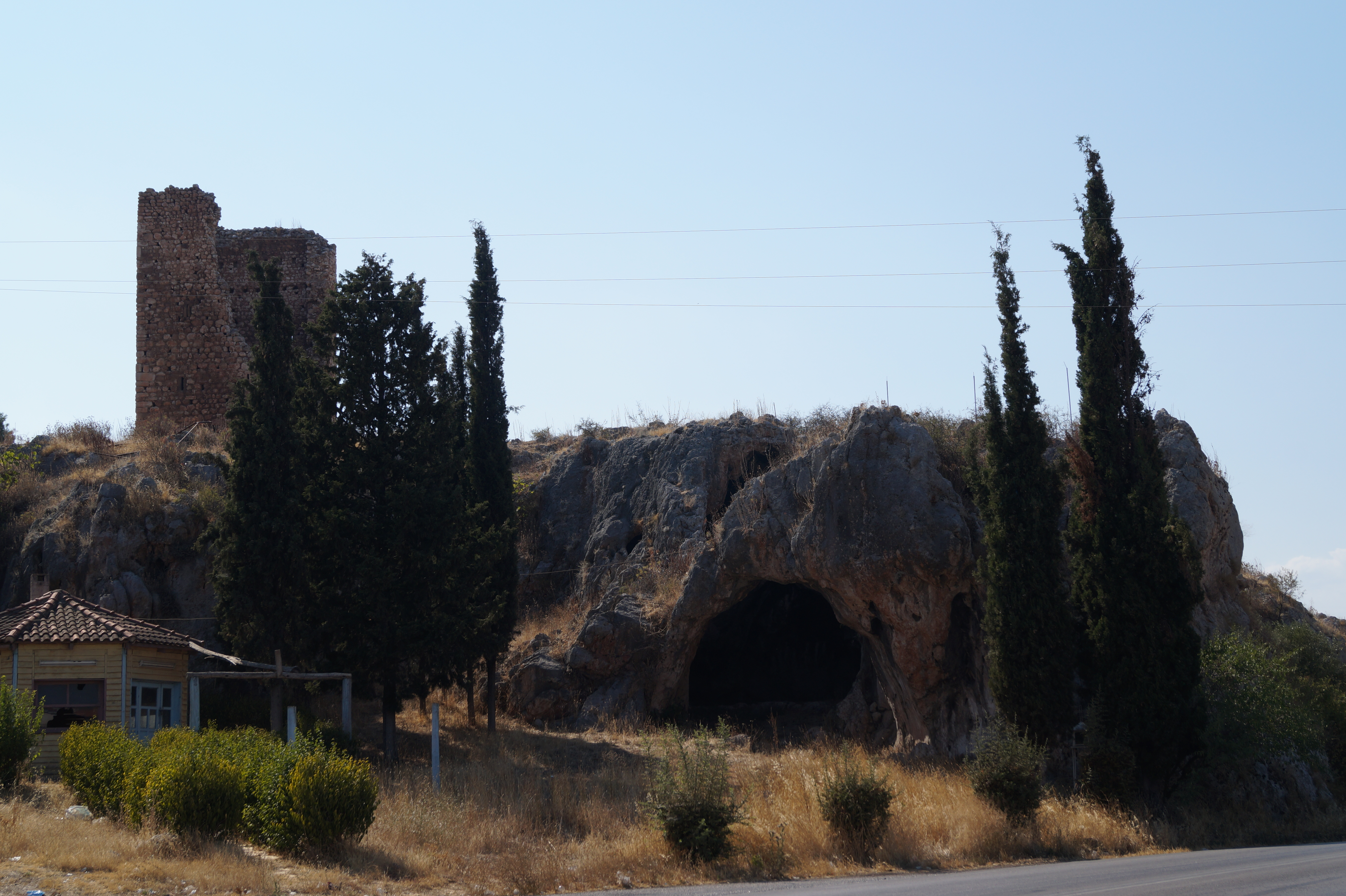
The tower today, with the caves at the foot of the cliff

The Tower of Aliartos or Tower of Moulki is a late medieval tower near Aliartos, in Boeotia, central Greece. It sits on a cliff, located close to the modern national road from Thebes to Livadeia, and on the southern shore of the ancient Lake Copais.

The tower is almost square, measuring 7.8 metres (26 ft) by 7.9 metres (26 ft) at its base, with a thickness of 1.65 metres (5.4 ft) at its base. The tower is preserved at a height of c. 15 metres (49 ft). It is built of hewn stone, mostly undressed but relatively regular; only the quoins are dressed, including some ancient spolia from the nearby acropolis of ancient Haliartos. The courses of stone diminish in size with rising height.

The tower had four floors. On the ground floor is a chamber some 3.5 metres (11 ft) on each side, covered by a semicircular arch. The two middle floors have each eight window slits, two on each wall, while the top floor was covered by a vault reinforced by a double arch, now collapsed. There is an opening at the base, but it is of modern creation; the original gate seems to have been located well above the ground, on the second floor level, on the tower's southern face; the existence of putlog holes suggests that a wooden staircase was affixed.

A number of caves exist at the edge of the cliff on which the tower sits, but it is unknown whether they are medieval, and possibly related to the tower, or of more recent date, the result of lime-burning.

It is variously regarded as part of a late Byzantine defence system along the Copais and the Boeotic Cephissus, but is most likely of Frankish construction.

== Sources ==
- Bon, Antoine (1937). "Forteresses médiévales de la Grèce centrale". Bulletin de correspondance hellénique (in French). 61: 136–208. doi:10.3406/bch.1937.2728.
- Koder, Johannes; Hild, Friedrich (1976). Tabula Imperii Byzantini, Band 1: Hellas und Thessalia (in German). Vienna: Verlag der Österreichischen Akademie der Wissenschaften. ISBN 978-3-7001-0182-6.
- Lock, Peter (1986). "The Frankish Towers of Central Greece". The Annual of the British School at Athens. 81: 101–123. doi:10.1017/S0068245400020104. S2CID 129263771.
