= Aliartos-Thespies =

Aliartos-Thespies Αλίαρτος-Θεσπιές
- Municipality
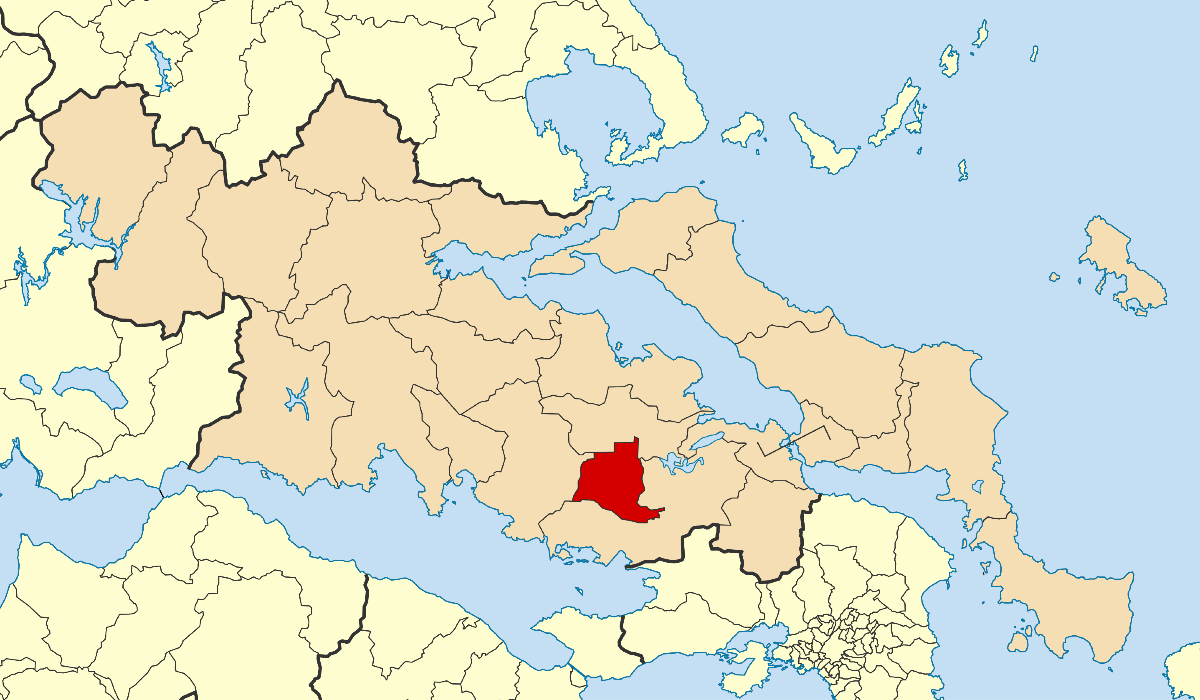

- Location within Greece
- Coordinates: 38°22′N 23°06′E
- Country: Greece
- Administrative region: Central Greece
- Regional unit: Boeotia
- Seat: Aliartos

Government
  - Mayor: Georgios Arapitsas (since 2023)

Area
  - Municipality: 256.507 km^{2} (99.038 sq mi)

Population (2021)
  - Municipality: 8,774
  - Density: 34.21/km^{2} (88.59/sq mi)
- Time zone: UTC+2 (EET)
  - Summer (DST): UTC+3 (EEST)
- Website: www.aliartos.gov.gr

Aliartos-Thespies (Greek: Αλίαρτος-Θεσπιές, until 2014: Aliartos) is a municipality in the Boeotia regional unit, Central Greece, Greece. The seat of the municipality is the town Aliartos. The municipality has an area of 256.507 km^{2}.

== Municipality ==
The municipality Aliartos-Thespies was formed at the 2011 local government reform, according to the Kallikratis programme, by the merger of the following former municipalities, that became municipal units:

- Aliartos
- Thespies
