= Demetrios Ypsilantis =

Greek military leader and politician (1793–1832)

Dimitrios Ypsilantis
- Δημήτριος Υψηλάντης (Greek); Dumitru Ipsilanti (Romanian); Дмитрий Константинович Ипсиланти (Russian)
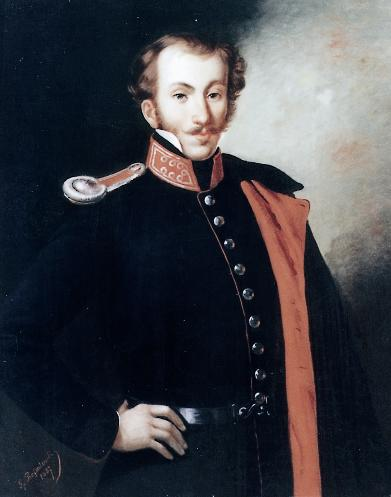
- Portrait by Spyridon Prosalentis
- Born: 1793; Constantinople, Ottoman Empire (now Istanbul, Turkey)
- Died: 16 August 1832 (aged 38–39); Nafplion, First Hellenic Republic
- Relatives: Alexandros Ypsilantis (grandfather); Constantine Ypsilantis (father); Alexandros Ypsilantis (brother); Manto Mavrogenous (mistress)
- Military career
- Allegiance: Russian Empire; First Hellenic Republic
- Branch: Imperial Russian Army; Filiki Etaireia; Greek Revolutionary Army; Hellenic Army
- Service years: 1814–1832
- Commands: General of the First Hellenic Republic
- Conflicts: War of the Sixth Coalition; Greek War of Independence; Wallachian uprising; Siege of Tripolitsa; Siege of Nauplia; Battle of Dervenakia; Battle of the Lerna Mills; Battle of Petra

Demetrios Ypsilantis (Note: Greek: Δημήτριος Υψηλάντης, pronounced [ðiˈmitri.os ipsiˈla(n)dis]; Romanian: Dumitru Ipsilanti; Russian: Дмитрий Константинович Ипсиланти, romanized: Dmitriy Konstantinovich Ipsilanti.) (alternatively spelled Demetrius Ypsilanti; 1793 – 16 August 1832) was a Greek army officer who served in both the Hellenic Army and the Imperial Russian Army. Ypsilantis played an important role in the Greek War of Independence, leading several key battles. He was also a member of the Filiki Eteria and the younger brother of Alexander Ypsilantis.

== Early life ==
A member of Phanariote noble Ypsilantis family, he was the second son of Prince Constantine Ypsilantis of Moldavia and Elisavet Ypsilanti. He was sent to France where he was educated at a French military school.

== Union of Moldavia and Wallachia ==
He distinguished himself as a Russian officer in the campaign of 1814.

In 1821, he took part in the Wallachian uprising under the leadership of his brother Alexandros, that indirectly benefited the Principalities of Moldavia and Wallachia. He led the revolt in Greece and arrived at Hydra in June 1821.

== The Greek War of Independence ==
The flag of the Sacred Band.

After the failure of the uprising in Wallachia, he went to the Morea in the Peloponnese, where the Greek War of Independence had just broken out, as representative of the Filiki Etaireia and his brother, Alexandros.

He was among the most prominent Phanariote leaders in the early stages of the revolt, though he was much hampered by local chiefs and the civilian element headed by Alexandros Mavrokordatos; as a result, the organisation of a regular army was slowed and operations limited. He took part in the Siege of Tripolitsa, of Nafplion, and the Battle of Dervenakia, securing Greek control of Morea.

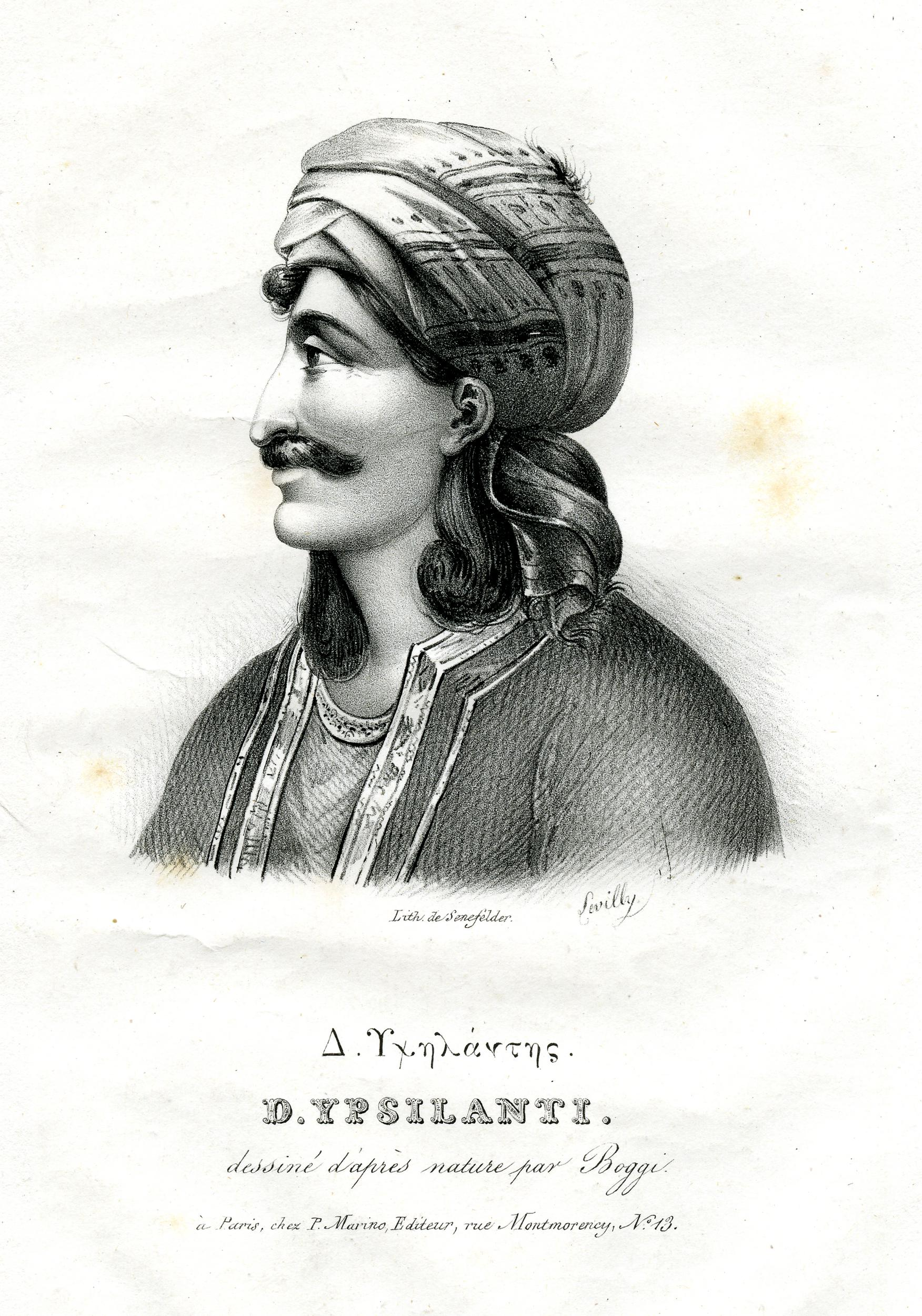
Portrait of Demetrios Ypsilantis, wearing a local costume and a turban.

On 15 January 1822, he was elected president of the First National Assembly at Epidaurus. However, due to the failure of his campaign in central Greece, and his failure to obtain a commanding position in the national convention of Astros, he was forced to retire in 1823. After the landing of Ibrahim at Morea, he took part in the defence of Nafplion in the Battle of the Lerna Mills.

In 1828, he was appointed in the newly established regular army by Ioannis Kapodistrias as commander of troops in eastern Greece. On 25 September 1829, he successfully compelled Aslan Bey to capitulate at the Pass of Petra (Battle of Petra), thus ending active operations of the war.

== Personal life ==
He was known for an affair with Manto Mavrogenous, a notable heroine of the Greek War of Independence.

== Death ==
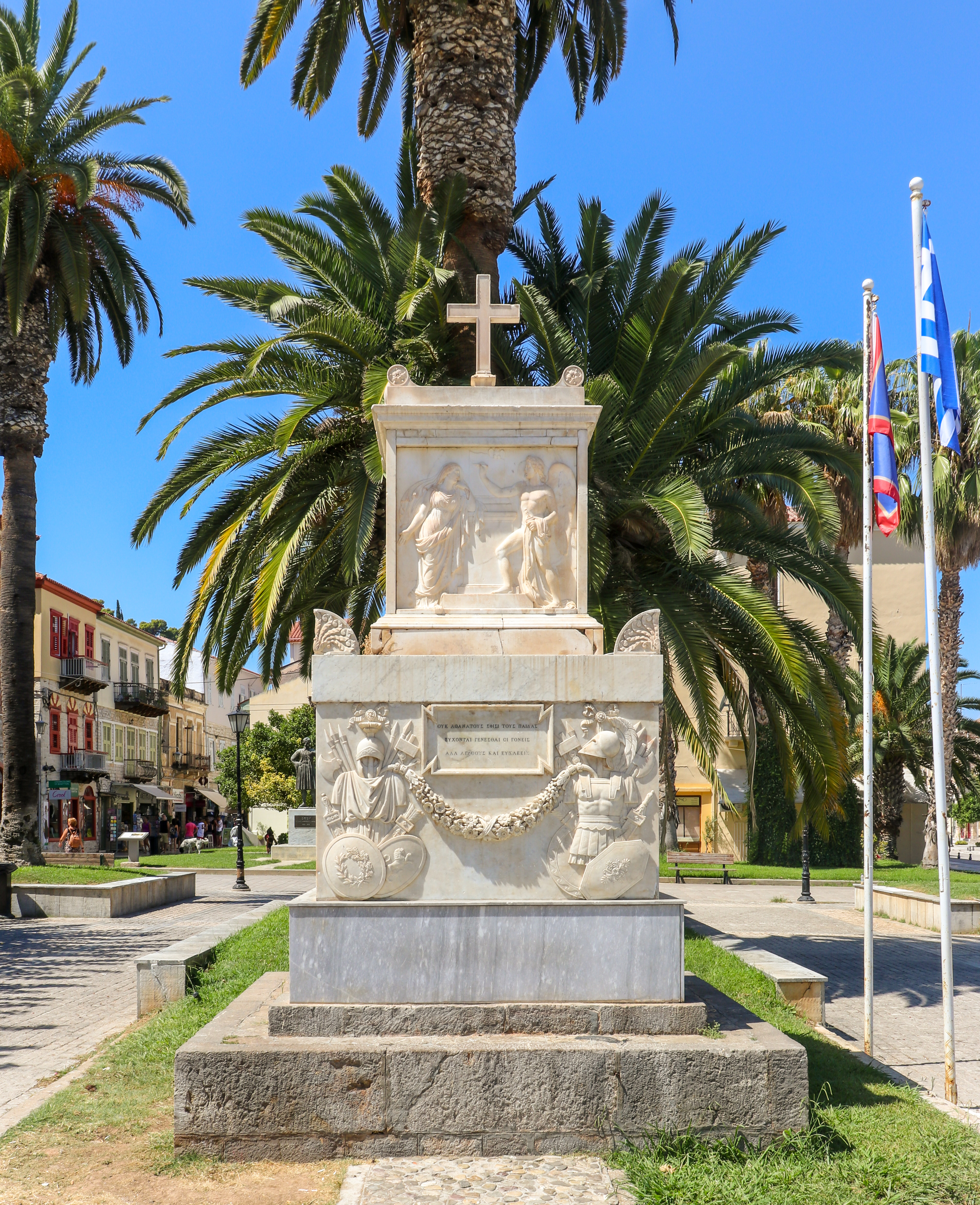
The funerary monument of Dimitrios Υpsilantis in Nafplion

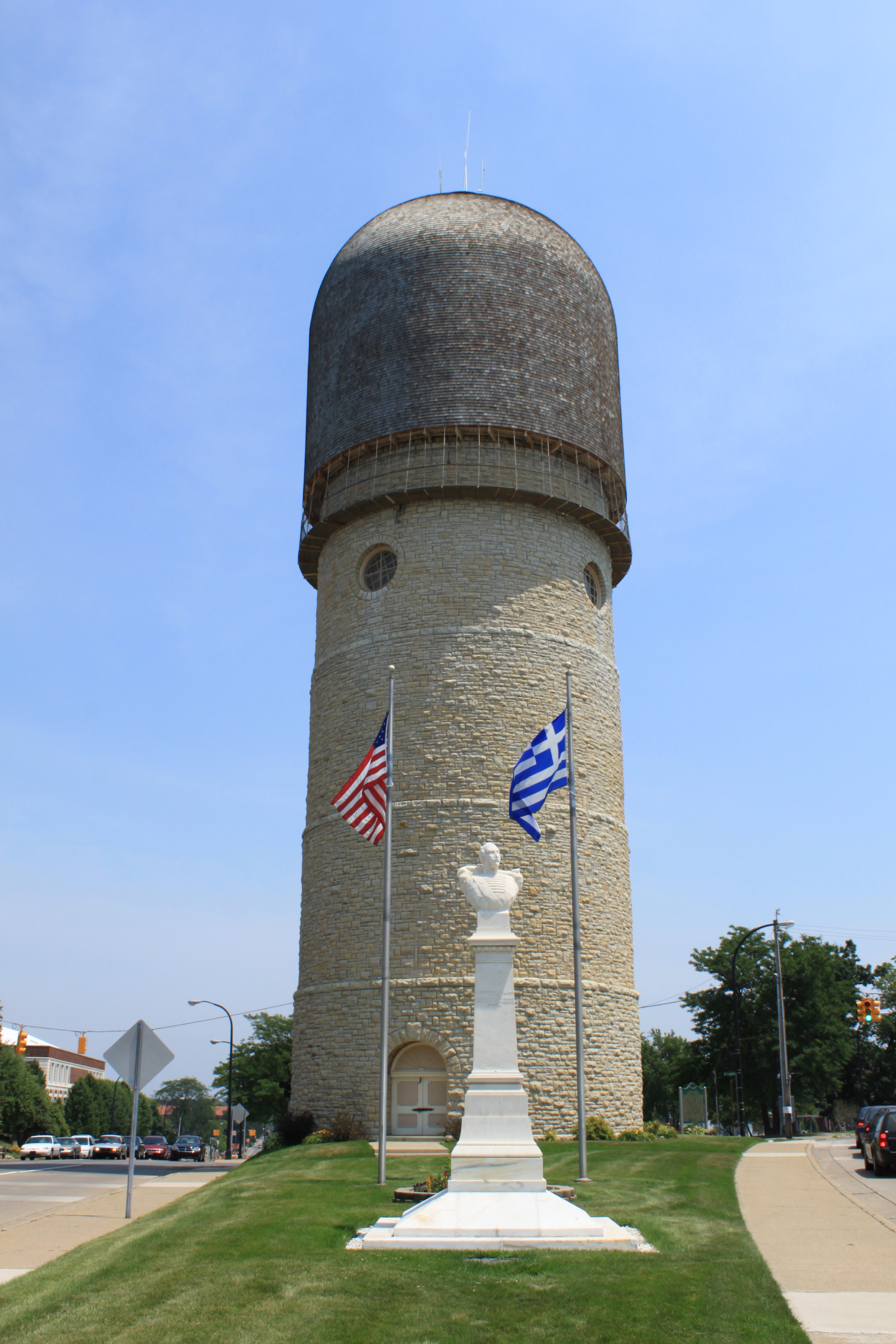
A bust of Demetrius Ypsilantis in front of the Ypsilanti Water Tower in Ypsilanti Michigan, United States.

He died due to illness in Nafplion on 16 August 1832.

== Legacy ==
- The city of Ypsilanti, Michigan, US, founded in 1823 during the Greek struggle for independence, is named after him. A bust of Demetrios Ypsilantis stands between the American and Greek flags at the base of the landmark Ypsilanti Water Tower.
- Ypsilanti, North Dakota, US, was named by a person from Ypsilanti, Michigan, and is thus also indirectly named after Demetrios Ypsilantis.
- Ypsilanti in Talbot County, Georgia, US, was once a relatively important cotton growing centre but "is now (2010) merely a crossroads with a reported five residences."

== See also ==
- Alexander Ypsilantis (1725-1805), his grandfather
- Constantine Ypsilantis, his father
- Alexander Ypsilantis (1792-1828), his brother
- Manto Mavrogenous, his fiancée and the love of his life

== Sources ==
- "Ипсиланти" . Brockhaus and Efron Encyclopedic Dictionary (in Russian). 1906.
- East, The Union of Moldavia and Wallachia, 1859 – An Episode in Diplomatic History, Thirlwall Prize Essay for 1927, Cambridge University Press (1929).
- Spencer, Susan (31 January 2021). "Hetairists". In Speake, Graham (ed.). Encyclopedia of Greece and the Hellenic Tradition. Routledge. ISBN 978-1-135-94206-9.
