= Konstantinos Metaxas =

Greek fighter and politician (1793–1870)

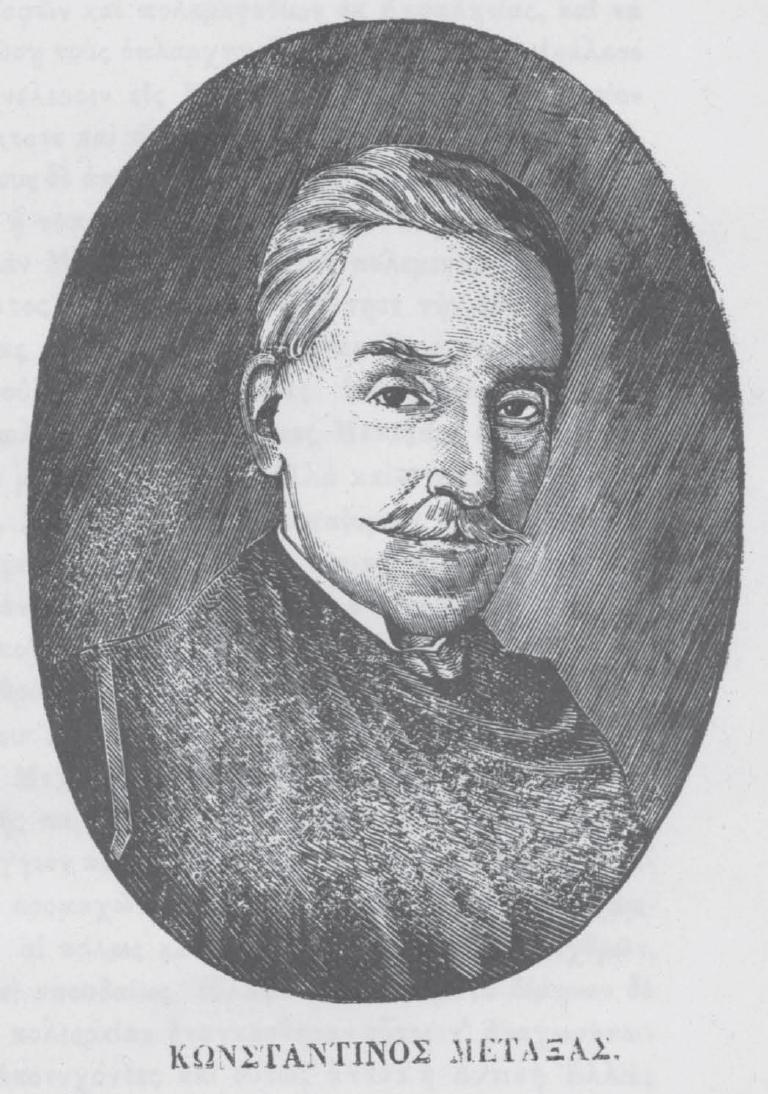
A picture of Konstantinos Metaxas.

Konstantinos Metaxas (Greek: Κωνσταντίνος Μεταξάς, 1793–1870) was a Greek fighter of the Greek War of Independence and politician from Cephalonia.

== Biography ==
=== Origin and activity in the War of Independence ===
He was born in Argostoli in 1793, as one of the four children of Nicholas Metaxas and Diamantina Andritsi. He studied law in Italy and returning to Cephalonia he worked as a lawyer. On the eve of the Greek Revolution he was initiated into the Filiki Eteria and in cooperation with the local archbishop Germanos, he organized the forthcoming local volunteer campaign in the Peloponnese. In May 1821, along with his cousin, Andreas Metaxas, he was one of the chiefs of the Cephalonian volunteers who disembarked at Glarentza and took part in the siege of Lala. Later, he participated as head of his compatriots in the battles around the city of Patras, but he suffered from typhus and he was transferred for treatment to Messolonghi.

In 1822, he was appointed by the Provisional Government as Minister of Justice and then as commissioner of the Aegean islands. For his services he was promoted to the rank of general at the beginning of 1823. The same year Metaxas was appointed as prefect of Western Continental Greece. With headquarters in Messolonghi, he ended the disputes between the chieftains of Western Greece and contributed to repel of Mustai Pasha of Skodra's troops. In 1825, he participated in the operations against Ibrahim Pasha of Egypt and became commandant of Palamidi fortress. When the danger of an attack by Ibrahim on Nafplio was removed, he went to the Aegean islands where he recruited about a thousand men. In 1826 he fought in the anti-piracy operations in the Aegean, as well as in the conflicts in Attica as was chief of the Ionian forces, while in 1827 he participated in the staff of general Richard Church.

=== Career in the independent Greek state ===
During the governorship of Ioannis Kapodistrias, Metaxas served as temporary commissioner of the Cyclades and then participated in the Fourth National Assembly at Argos as a representative of the Peloponnesians. During the years of the Regency he experienced prosecutions and he fled to the Ionian Islands. From there he returned to Greece in 1843, and was placed as a member of the Council of State. In 1855 he received the rank of colonel of the Royal Phalanx. In 1861 he was appointed as a senator. After the abolition of the institution he retired to his hometown where he wrote the "Memoirs of the Greek Revolution", which were released after his death. Konstantinos Metaxas died in 1870 in Cephalonia.

He was married from 1830 to the daughter of a rich and illustrious Muslim family of Laconia, who was saved from the massive massacres of her co-religionists and converted to Christianity adopting the name Eleni. From their marriage, they had eight children among whom was the military officer and cabinet minister Nikolaos Metaxas.
