= List of prime ministers of Greece =

This is a list of the heads of government of the modern Greek state, from its establishment during the Greek War of Independence to the present day. Although various official and semi-official appellations were used during the early decades of independent statehood, the title of prime minister has been the formal designation of the office at least since 1843. On dates, Greece officially adopted the Gregorian calendar on 16 February 1923 (which became 1 March). All dates prior to that, unless specifically denoted, are Old Style.

== Color key ==
Party affiliation (1822–1974)
Russian Party	English Party	French Party
National Party	New Party	National Committee
Liberal Party	People's Party	Communist Party
National Progressive Center Union	Greek Rally	National Radical Union
Centre Union	Independent	Military (Non-partisan)
Party affiliation (1974–present)
New Democracy (ND)	Panhellenic Socialist Movement (PASOK)	Coalition of the Radical Left (SYRIZA)

== First Hellenic Republic (1822–1833) ==
The heads of government of the provisional Greek state during the Greek War of Independence, and the subsequent Hellenic State.

Portrait	Name (Birth–Death)	Term of office			Political party	Notes
Portrait	Name (Birth–Death)	Took office	Left office	Time in office	Political party	Notes
Provisional Administration of Greece (1822–1827)
	Alexandros Mavrokordatos; Αλέξανδρος Μαυροκορδάτος (1791–1865)	15 January 1822	26 April 1823	1 year, 101 days	Independent	President of the Executive of 1822. Theodoros Negris held the office of "President of the Ministerial Council".
	Petros Mavromichalis; Πέτρος Μαυρομιχάλης (1765–1848)	26 April 1823	5 January 1824	254 days	Independent	President of the Executive of 1823.
	Georgios Kountouriotis; Γεώργιος Κουντουριώτης (1782–1858)	6 January 1824	17 April 1826	2 years, 101 days	Independent	President of the Executive of 1824.
	Andreas Zaimis; Ανδρέας Ζαΐμης (1791–1840)	18 April 1826	26 March 1827	342 days	Independent	President of the Governmental Commission of Greece (1826).
Hellenic State (1827–1833)
	Vice-gubernatorial Committee of 1827	3 April 1827	20 January 1828	292 days	Independent	3 member committee (Georgios Mavromichalis, Ioannis Milaitis, Ioannis Nakos) governing in the name of the designated Governor, Ioannis Kapodistrias, until his arrival in Greece.
	Ioannis Kapodistrias; Ιωάννης Καποδίστριας (1776–1831)	20 January 1828	27 September 1831	3 years, 250 days	Independent	Governor of Greece, Head of State and Government. Assassinated on 9 October 1831 (27 September O.S.).
	Augustinos Kapodistrias; Αυγουστίνος Καποδίστριας (1778–1857)	27 September 1831	7 December 1831	1 year, 71 days	Independent	President of the Administrative Committee of Greece (1831), which also included Ioannis Kolettis and Theodoros Kolokotronis.
	Administrative Committee of Greece (1832)	28 March 1832	25 January 1833	302 days	Independent	5 member committee

== Kingdom of Greece – King Otto reign (1833–1862) ==
The heads of government during the reign of King Otto.

Portrait	Name (Birth–Death)	Election	Term of office			Political party	Notes
Portrait	Name (Birth–Death)	Election	Took office	Left office	Time in office	Political party	Notes
Absolute Monarchy (1833–1843)
	Spyridon Trikoupis; Σπυρίδων Τρικούπης (1788–1873)	—	25 January 1833	3 April 1833	260 days	English Party	President of the Ministerial Council.
	Spyridon Trikoupis; Σπυρίδων Τρικούπης (1788–1873)	—	3 April 1833	12 October 1833	260 days	English Party	President of the Ministerial Council.
	Alexandros Mavrokordatos; Αλέξανδρος Μαυροκορδάτος (1791–1865)	—	12 October 1833	31 May 1834	231 days	English Party	President of the Ministerial Council, resigned due to disagreements with the regency.
	Ioannis Kolettis; Ιωάννης Κωλέττης (1774–1847)	—	31 May 1834	9 May 1835	343 days	French Party	President of the Ministerial Council.
	Count Josef Ludwig von Armansperg; Κόμης Ιωσήφ Λουδοβίκος Άρμανσπεργκ (1787–1853)	—	9 May 1835	2 February 1837	1 year, 269 days	Independent	Chief Secretary of State.
	Ignaz von Rudhart; Ιγνάτιος φον Ρούτχαρτ (1790–1838)	—	2 February 1837	8 December 1837	309 days	Independent	Chief Secretary of State.
	King Otto; Βασιλεύς Όθων (1815–1867)	—	8 December 1837	24 June 1841	3 years, 198 days	Independent	Personally supervised the cabinet.
	Alexandros Mavrokordatos; Αλέξανδρος Μαυροκορδάτος (1791–1865)	—	24 June 1841	10 August 1841	47 days	English Party	Chief Secretary of State; appointed on 10 February while ambassador to Britain, but returned to Greece and formed government on 24 June.
	King Otto; Βασιλεύς Όθων (1815–1867)	—	10 August 1841	3 September 1843	2 years, 24 days	Independent	Personally supervised the cabinet until the 3 September 1843 Revolution.
Constitutional Monarchy (1843–1862)
	Andreas Metaxas; Ανδρέας Μεταξάς (1790–1860)	1843	3 September 1843	12 February 1844	162 days	Russian Party	Provisional cabinet following the 3 September 1843 Revolution. Elections for the Constitutional Assembly.
	Konstantinos Kanaris; Κωνσταντίνος Κανάρης (1790–1877)	—	12 February 1844	30 March 1844	47 days	Russian Party	Provisional Cabinet. Adoption of the 1844 Constitution.
	Alexandros Mavrokordatos; Αλέξανδρος Μαυροκορδάτος (1791–1865)	—	30 March 1844	4 August 1844	127 days	English Party	Caretaker cabinet for the 1844 elections.
	Ioannis Kolettis; Ιωάννης Κωλέττης (1774–1847)	1844; 1847	6 August 1844	5 September 1847	3 years, 30 days	French Party	Died in office.
	Kitsos Tzavelas; Κίτσος Τζαβέλας (1801–1855)	—	5 September 1847	8 March 1848	185 days	Russian Party	Tzavellas was Otto's aide-de-camp and nominated to succeed Kolettis by the King.
	Georgios Kountouriotis; Γεώργιος Κουντουριώτης (1782–1858)	—	8 March 1848	12 October 1848	218 days	French Party	Headed joint French Party and Russian Party cabinet.
	Konstantinos Kanaris; Κωνσταντίνος Κανάρης (1790–1877)	—	27 October 1848	14 December 1849	1 year, 48 days	Russian Party	
	Antonios Kriezis; Αντώνιος Κριεζής (1796–1865)	1850; 1853	14 December 1849	16 May 1854	4 years, 153 days	English Party	Government resigned due to Great Power pressure including the landing of French troops in Piraeus, enforcing Greece's neutrality during the Crimean War.
	Alexandros Mavrokordatos; Αλέξανδρος Μαυροκορδάτος (1791–1865)	—	16 May 1854	29 September 1855	1 year, 136 days	English Party	Called the "Occupation Ministry" due to its installment after the landing of French troops.
	Dimitrios Voulgaris; Δημήτριος Βούλγαρης (1802–1878)	1856	29 September 1855	13 November 1857	2 years, 45 days	French Party	
	Athanasios Miaoulis; Αθανάσιος Μιαούλης (1815–1867)	1859; 1861	13 November 1857	26 May 1862	4 years, 194 days	Military	Cabinet fell following the 1859 elections. Konstantinos Kanaris failed to form a new cabinet, and Miaoulis resumed his post after him on 29 May 1859.
	Gennaios Kolokotronis; Γενναίος Κολοκοτρώνης (1803–1868)	—	26 May 1862	11 October 1862	138 days	Military	Resigned following the deposition of King Otto by the 23 October 1862 Revolution.
Regency (1862–1863)
	Dimitrios Voulgaris; Δημήτριος Βούλγαρης (1802–1878)	1862	11 October 1862	9 February 1863	121 days	French Party	Head of Provisional Government. Held elections for the National Assembly.
	Aristeidis Moraitinis; Αριστείδης Μωραϊτίνης (1806–1875)	—	9 February 1863	11 February 1863	2 days	French Party	President of the National Assembly.
	Zinovios Valvis; Ζηνόβιος Βάλβης (1800–1886)	—	11 February 1863	25 March 1863	42 days	Independent	Head of Provisional Government, appointed by the National Assembly.
	Diomidis Kyriakos; Διομήδης Κυριακός (1811–1869)	—	27 March 1863	29 April 1863	33 days	Independent	Head of Provisional Government, appointed by the National Assembly.
	Benizelos Roufos; Μπενιζέλος Ρούφος (1795–1868)	—	29 April 1863	19 June 1863	51 days	French Party	Head of Provisional Government, appointed by the National Assembly. On 19 June dismissed by the Assembly under Diomidis Kyriakos due to the "Iouniana" clashes, re-assumed government on 21 June until the arrival of King George I.
	Benizelos Roufos; Μπενιζέλος Ρούφος (1795–1868)	—	21 June 1863	18 October 1863	51 days	French Party	Head of Provisional Government, appointed by the National Assembly. On 19 June dismissed by the Assembly under Diomidis Kyriakos due to the "Iouniana" clashes, re-assumed government on 21 June until the arrival of King George I.

== Kingdom of Greece – Glücksburg dynasty (1863–1924) ==
The heads of government during the first period of the Glücksburg dynasty.

Portrait	Name (Birth–Death)	Election	Term of office			Political party	Notes
Portrait	Name (Birth–Death)	Election	Took office	Left office	Time in office	Political party	Notes
	Dimitrios Voulgaris; Δημήτριος Βούλγαρης (1802–1878)	—	25 October 1863	5 March 1864	132 days	French Party	
	Konstantinos Kanaris; Κωνσταντίνος Κανάρης (1790–1877)	—	5 March 1864	16 April 1864	42 days	Russian Party	New Constitution adopted.
	Zinovios Valvis; Ζηνόβιος Βάλβης (1800–1886)	—	16 April 1864	26 July 1864	101 days	Independent	
	Konstantinos Kanaris; Κωνσταντίνος Κανάρης (1790–1877)	—	26 July 1864	2 March 1865	219 days	Russian Party	
	Alexandros Koumoundouros; Αλέξανδρος Κουμουνδούρος (1817–1883)	1865	2 March 1865	20 October 1865	232 days	National Party	
	Epameinondas Deligeorgis; Επαμεινώνδας Δεληγιώργης (1829–1879)	—	20 October 1865	3 November 1865	14 days	National Committee	
	Dimitrios Voulgaris; Δημήτριος Βούλγαρης (1802–1878)	—	3 November 1865	6 November 1865	3 days	Independent	
	Alexandros Koumoundouros; Αλέξανδρος Κουμουνδούρος (1817–1883)	—	6 November 1865	13 November 1865	7 days	National Party	
	Epameinondas Deligeorgis; Επαμεινώνδας Δεληγιώργης (1829–1879)	—	13 November 1865	28 November 1865	15 days	National Committee	
	Benizelos Roufos; Μπενιζέλος Ρούφος (1795–1868)	—	28 November 1865	9 June 1866	193 days	Independent	
	Dimitrios Voulgaris; Δημήτριος Βούλγαρης (1802–1878)	—	9 June 1866	17 December 1866	191 days	Independent	
	Alexandros Koumoundouros; Αλέξανδρος Κουμουνδούρος (1817–1883)	—	18 December 1866	20 December 1867	1 year, 2 days	National Party	
	Aristeidis Moraitinis; Αριστείδης Μωραϊτίνης (1806–1875)	—	20 December 1867	25 January 1868	36 days	Independent	
	Dimitrios Voulgaris; Δημήτριος Βούλγαρης (1802–1878)	1868	25 January 1868	25 January 1869	1 year	Independent	
	Thrasyvoulos Zaimis; Θρασύβουλος Ζαΐμης (1829–1880)	1869	25 January 1869	9 July 1870	1 year, 165 days	Independent	
	Epameinondas Deligeorgis; Επαμεινώνδας Δεληγιώργης (1829–1879)	—	9 July 1870	3 December 1870	147 days	National Committee	
	Alexandros Koumoundouros; Αλέξανδρος Κουμουνδούρος (1817–1883)	—	3 December 1870	28 October 1871	329 days	National Party	
	Thrasyvoulos Zaimis; Θρασύβουλος Ζαΐμης (1829–1880)	—	28 October 1871	25 December 1871	58 days	Independent	
	Dimitrios Voulgaris; Δημήτριος Βούλγαρης (1802–1878)	1872	25 December 1871	8 July 1872	196 days	Independent	
	Epameinondas Deligeorgis; Επαμεινώνδας Δεληγιώργης (1829–1879)	1873	8 July 1872	9 February 1874	1 year, 216 days	National Committee	
	Dimitrios Voulgaris; Δημήτριος Βούλγαρης (1802–1878)	1874	9 February 1874	27 April 1875	1 year, 77 days	Independent	
	Charilaos Trikoupis; Χαρίλαος Τρικούπης (1832–1896)	1875	27 April 1875	15 October 1875	171 days	New Party	Principle of parliamentary majority introduced.
	Alexandros Koumoundouros; Αλέξανδρος Κουμουνδούρος (1817–1883)	—	15 October 1875	26 November 1876	1 year, 42 days	National Party	
	Epameinondas Deligeorgis; Επαμεινώνδας Δεληγιώργης (1829–1879)	—	26 November 1876	1 December 1876	5 days	National Committee	
	Alexandros Koumoundouros; Αλέξανδρος Κουμουνδούρος (1817–1883)	—	1 December 1876	26 February 1877	87 days	National Party	
	Epameinondas Deligeorgis (1829–1879)	—	26 February 1877	19 May 1877	82 days	National Committee	
	Alexandros Koumoundouros (1817–1883)	—	19 May 1877	26 May 1877	7 days	National Party	
	Konstantinos Kanaris; Κωνσταντίνος Κανάρης (1790–1877)	—	26 May 1877	2 September 1877	99 days	Independent	Government of national unity
	Alexandros Koumoundouros; Αλέξανδρος Κουμουνδούρος (1817–1883)	—	11 January 1878	21 October 1878	283 days	National Party	
	Charilaos Trikoupis; Χαρίλαος Τρικούπης (1832–1896)	—	21 October 1878	26 October 1878	5 days	New Party	
	Alexandros Koumoundouros; Αλέξανδρος Κουμουνδούρος (1817–1883)	1879	26 October 1878	10 March 1880	1 year, 136 days	National Party	
	Charilaos Trikoupis; Χαρίλαος Τρικούπης (1832–1896)	—	10 March 1880	13 October 1880	217 days	New Party	
	Alexandros Koumoundouros; Αλέξανδρος Κουμουνδούρος (1817–1883)	1881	13 October 1880	3 March 1882	1 year, 141 days	National Party	
	Charilaos Trikoupis; Χαρίλαος Τρικούπης (1832–1896)	—	3 March 1882	19 April 1885	3 years, 47 days	New Party	
	Theodoros Deligiannis; Θεόδωρος Δηλιγιάννης (1820–1905)	1885	19 April 1885	30 April 1886	1 year, 11 days	National Party	
	Dimitrios Valvis; Δημήτριος Βάλβης (1814–1892)	—	30 April 1886	9 May 1886	9 days	Independent	
	Charilaos Trikoupis; Χαρίλαος Τρικούπης (1832–1896)	1887	9 May 1886	24 October 1890	4 years, 168 days	New Party	Three consecutive terms.
	Theodoros Deligiannis; Θεόδωρος Δηλιγιάννης (1820–1905)	1890	24 October 1890	18 February 1892	1 year, 117 days	National Party	
	Konstantinos Konstantopoulos; Κωνσταντίνος Κωνσταντόπουλος (1832–1910)	1892	10 February 1892	10 June 1892	121 days	National Party	
	Charilaos Trikoupis; Χαρίλαος Τρικούπης (1832–1896)	—	10 June 1892	3 May 1893	327 days	New Party	Public insolvency declared.
	Sotirios Sotiropoulos; Σωτήριος Σωτηρόπουλος (1831–1898)	—	3 May 1893	30 October 1893	180 days	Independent	
	Charilaos Trikoupis; Χαρίλαος Τρικούπης (1832–1896)	—	30 October 1893	12 January 1895	1 year, 74 days	New Party	
	Nikolaos Deligiannis; Νικόλαος Δηλιγιάννης (1845–1910)	1895	12 January 1895	31 May 1895	139 days	National Party	
	Theodoros Deligiannis; Θεόδωρος Δηλιγιάννης (1820–1905)	—	31 May 1895	18 April 1897	1 year, 322 days	National Party	
	Dimitrios Rallis; Δημήτριος Ράλλης (1844–1921)	—	18 April 1897	21 September 1897	156 days	Independent	
	Alexandros Zaimis; Αλέξανδρος Ζαΐμης (1855–1936)	1899	21 September 1897	2 April 1899	1 year, 193 days	Independent	
	Georgios Theotokis; Γεώργιος Θεοτόκης (1844–1916)	—	2 April 1899	12 November 1901	2 years, 224 days	New Party	
	Alexandros Zaimis; Αλέξανδρος Ζαΐμης (1855–1936)	1902	12 November 1901	18 November 1902	1 year, 6 days	Independent	
	Theodoros Deligiannis; Θεόδωρος Δηλιγιάννης (1820–1905)	—	24 November 1902	14 June 1903	202 days	National Party	
	Georgios Theotokis; Γεώργιος Θεοτόκης (1844–1916)	—	14 June 1903	28 June 1903	14 days	New Party	
	Dimitrios Rallis; Δημήτριος Ράλλης (1844–1921)	—	28 June 1903	6 December 1903	161 days	Independent	
	Georgios Theotokis; Γεώργιος Θεοτόκης (1844–1916)	—	6 December 1903	17 December 1904	1 year, 11 days	New Party	
	Theodoros Deligiannis; Θεόδωρος Δηλιγιάννης (1820–1905)	1905	17 December 1904	9 June 1905	174 days	National Party	
	Dimitrios Rallis; Δημήτριος Ράλλης (1844–1921)	—	9 June 1905	8 December 1905	182 days	Independent	
	Georgios Theotokis; Γεώργιος Θεοτόκης (1844–1916)	1906	8 December 1905	7 July 1909	3 years, 211 days	New Party	
	Dimitrios Rallis; Δημήτριος Ράλλης (1844–1921)	—	7 July 1909	15 August 1909	39 days	Independent	Goudi coup by the Military League.
	Kyriakoulis Mavromichalis; Κυριακούλης Μαυρομιχάλης (1849–1916)	—	15 August 1909	18 January 1910	156 days	National Party	Supervised by the Military League.
	Stefanos Dragoumis; Στέφανος Δραγούμης (1842–1923)	Aug. 1910	18 January 1910	6 October 1910	261 days	Independent	
	Eleftherios Venizelos; Ελευθέριος Βενιζέλος (1864–1936)	Nov. 1910; 1912	6 October 1910	25 February 1915	4 years, 142 days	Liberal Party	Two terms (Nov. 1910 and 1912 elections). New Constitution adopted. Resigned after disagreement with King Constantine I.
	Dimitrios Gounaris; Δημήτριος Γούναρης (1866–1922)	May 1915	25 February 1915	10 August 1915	166 days	People's Party	
	Eleftherios Venizelos; Ελευθέριος Βενιζέλος (1864–1936)	—	10 August 1915	24 September 1915	45 days	Liberal Party	Won May elections, resigned again over disagreement with the king over Greece's entry into World War I. Begin of National Schism.
	Alexandros Zaimis; Αλέξανδρος Ζαΐμης (1855–1936)	—	24 September 1915	25 October 1915	31 days	Independent	
	Stefanos Skouloudis; Στέφανος Σκουλούδης (1836–1928)	Dec. 1915	25 October 1915	9 June 1916	228 days	Independent	
	Alexandros Zaimis; Αλέξανδρος Ζαΐμης (1855–1936)	—	9 June 1916	3 September 1916	86 days	Independent	
	Nikolaos Kalogeropoulos; Νικόλαος Καλογερόπουλος (1853–1927)	—	3 September 1916	27 September 1916	24 days	Independent	Official "royal" governments, controlling southern Greece. Opposed by "Provisional Government of National Defence".
	Spyridon Lambros; Σπυρίδων Λάμπρος (1851–1919)	—	27 September 1916	21 April 1917	206 days	Independent	Official "royal" governments, controlling southern Greece. Opposed by "Provisional Government of National Defence".
	Alexandros Zaimis; Αλέξανδρος Ζαΐμης (1855–1936)	—	21 April 1917	14 June 1917	54 days	Independent	Official "royal" governments, controlling southern Greece. Opposed by "Provisional Government of National Defence".
	Eleftherios Venizelos; Ελευθέριος Βενιζέλος (1864–1936)	—	27 September 1916	14 June 1917	4 years, 38 days	Liberal Party	Rival "Provisional Government of National Defence" in Thessaloniki controlling northern Greece, the Aegean Islands and Crete. Recognized by World War I Allies as of 19 December 1916. Entered World War I.
	Eleftherios Venizelos; Ελευθέριος Βενιζέλος (1864–1936)	—	14 June 1917	4 November 1920	4 years, 38 days	Liberal Party	Abdication of King Constantine after Allied ultimatum. Controlling the entire country, official entry of Greece into World War I.
	Dimitrios Rallis; Δημήτριος Ράλλης (1844–1921)	1920	4 November 1920	24 January 1921	81 days	People's Party	
	Nikolaos Kalogeropoulos; Νικόλαος Καλογερόπουλος (1853–1927)	—	24 January 1921	26 March 1921	61 days	People's Party	
	Dimitrios Gounaris; Δημήτριος Γούναρης (1866–1922)	—	26 March 1921	3 May 1922	1 year, 38 days	People's Party	
	Nikolaos Stratos; Νικόλαος Στράτος (1872–1922)	—	3 May 1922	9 May 1922	6 days	People's Party	
	Petros Protopapadakis; Πέτρος Πρωτοπαπαδάκης (1860–1922)	—	9 May 1922	28 August 1922	111 days	People's Party	
	Nikolaos Triantafyllakos; Νικόλαος Τριανταφυλλάκος (1855–1939)	—	28 August 1922	16 September 1922	19 days	Independent	Military revolt after the Asia Minor Catastrophe, led by Colonels Nikolaos Plastiras and Stylianos Gonatas.
	Anastasios Charalambis; Αναστάσιος Χαραλάμπης (1862–1949)	—	16 September 1922	17 September 1922	1 day	Military	Lt. General. Prime Minister for one day in absence of Sotirios Krokidas from Athens.
	Sotirios Krokidas; Σωτήριος Κροκιδάς (1852–1924)	—	17 September 1922	14 November 1922	58 days	Independent	Law professor. Head of interim government under military supervision. Resigned over Trial of the Six.
	Stylianos Gonatas; Στυλιανός Γονατάς (1876–1966)	1923	14 November 1922	11 January 1924	1 year, 58 days	Military	Colonel. On 15 January, Plastiras and Gonatas surrendered power to the National Assembly.
	Eleftherios Venizelos; Ελευθέριος Βενιζέλος (1864–1936)	—	11 January 1924	6 February 1924	26 days	Liberal Party	
	Georgios Kafantaris; Γεώργιος Καφαντάρης (1873–1946)	—	6 February 1924	12 March 1924	35 days	Liberal Party	

== Second Hellenic Republic (1924–1935) ==
Portrait	Name (Birth–Death)	Election	Term of office			Political party	Notes
Portrait	Name (Birth–Death)	Election	Took office	Left office	Time in office	Political party	Notes
	Alexandros Papanastasiou; Αλέξανδρος Παπαναστασίου (1876–1936)	—	12 March 1924	24 July 1924	134 days	Independent	Government formed in alliance with Liberal Party. Republic proclaimed on 25 March and confirmed by referendum on 13 April.
	Themistoklis Sofoulis; Θεμιστοκλής Σοφούλης (1860–1949)	—	24 July 1924	7 October 1924	75 days	Liberal Party	
	Andreas Michalakopoulos; Ανδρέας Μιχαλακόπουλος (1876–1938)	—	7 October 1924	26 June 1925	262 days	Liberal Party	Overthrown by coup.
	Theodoros Pangalos; Θεόδωρος Πάγκαλος (1878–1952)	—	26 June 1925	19 July 1926	1 year, 23 days	Military	Lt. General. Established dictatorship.
	Athanasios Eftaxias; Αθανάσιος Ευταξίας (1849–1931)	—	19 July 1926	23 August 1926	35 days	Independent	Under Theodoros Pangalos' dictatorship.
	Georgios Kondylis; Γεώργιος Κονδύλης (1879–1936)	—	26 August 1926	4 December 1926	100 days	Military	Major General. Overthrew Pangalos, de facto since 23 August, head of caretaker government.
	Alexandros Zaimis; Αλέξανδρος Ζαΐμης (1855–1936)	1926	4 December 1926	17 August 1927	1 year, 213 days	Independent	Compromise candidate heading "ecumenical government" after no party won parliamentary majority during the November 1926 elections. Passage of the 1927 Constitution.
	Alexandros Zaimis; Αλέξανδρος Ζαΐμης (1855–1936)	1926	17 August 1927	8 February 1928	1 year, 213 days	Independent	Compromise candidate heading "ecumenical government" after no party won parliamentary majority during the November 1926 elections. Passage of the 1927 Constitution.
	Alexandros Zaimis; Αλέξανδρος Ζαΐμης (1855–1936)	1926	8 February 1928	4 July 1928	1 year, 213 days	Independent	Compromise candidate heading "ecumenical government" after no party won parliamentary majority during the November 1926 elections. Passage of the 1927 Constitution.
	Eleftherios Venizelos; Ελευθέριος Βενιζέλος (1864–1936)	1928	4 July 1928	7 June 1929	3 years, 327 days	Liberal Party	Won 1928 elections. Friendship Treaty with Turkey (1930), agrarian reforms.
	Eleftherios Venizelos; Ελευθέριος Βενιζέλος (1864–1936)	1928	7 June 1929	16 December 1929	3 years, 327 days	Liberal Party	Won 1928 elections. Friendship Treaty with Turkey (1930), agrarian reforms.
	Eleftherios Venizelos; Ελευθέριος Βενιζέλος (1864–1936)	1928	16 December 1929	26 May 1932	3 years, 327 days	Liberal Party	Won 1928 elections. Friendship Treaty with Turkey (1930), agrarian reforms.
	Alexandros Papanastasiou; Αλέξανδρος Παπαναστασίου (1876–1936)	—	26 May 1932	5 June 1932	10 days	Agricultural and Labour Party	
	Eleftherios Venizelos; Ελευθέριος Βενιζέλος (1864–1936)	—	5 June 1932	4 November 1932	152 days	Liberal Party	
	Panagis Tsaldaris; Παναγής Τσαλδάρης (1868–1936)	1932	4 November 1932	16 January 1933	73 days	People's Party	
	Eleftherios Venizelos; Ελευθέριος Βενιζέλος (1864–1936)	—	16 January 1933	6 March 1933	49 days	Liberal Party	Lost 5 March 1933 elections; outbreak of pro-Venizelist military coup attempt.
	Alexandros Othonaios; Αλέξανδρος Οθωναίος (1879–1970)	—	6 March 1933	10 March 1933	4 days	Military	Venizelist Lt. General. Head of military emergency government during the pro-Venizelist military coup attempt.
	Panagis Tsaldaris; Παναγής Τσαλδάρης (1868–1936)	1933; 1935	10 March 1933	10 October 1935	2 years, 214 days	People's Party	After successful suppression of the pro-Venizelist military coup attempt in March 1935, gradual reorientation towards restoration of monarchy. Toppled by Armed Forces coup d'état.

== Kingdom of Greece – Glücksburg dynasty restored (1935–1974) ==
The heads of government during the second period of the Glücksburg dynasty, including the rival governments during the Second World War and the Civil War, as well as the 1967–74 military regime.

Portrait	Name (Birth–Death)	Election	Term of office			Political party	Notes
Portrait	Name (Birth–Death)	Election	Took office	Left office	Time in office	Political party	Notes
	Georgios Kondylis; Γεώργιος Κονδύλης (1879–1936)	—	10 October 1935	30 November 1935	51 days	Military/National Radical Party	Lt. General and head of the small National Radical Party. Assumed government with the support of the Armed Forces chiefs, abolished the Republic on 10 October, confirmed by referendum. Regent until the return of King George II on 3 November 1935.
	Konstantinos Demertzis; Κωνσταντίνος Δεμερτζής (1876–1936)	1936	30 November 1935	13 April 1936	135 days	Independent	Professor of Law, elected as a neutral candidate, initially as head of a caretaker government. After the deadlock of the 1936 elections and until his death, head of compromise government.
	Ioannis Metaxas; Ιωάννης Μεταξάς (1871–1941)	—	13 April 1936	29 January 1941	4 years, 291 days	Independent (ex-Freethinkers' Party)	Retired Lt. General. Vice-president of Demertzis' government. Suspended Parliament and established dictatorship on 4 August 1936.
	Alexandros Koryzis; Αλέξανδρος Κορυζής (1885–1941)	—	29 January 1941	18 April 1941	79 days	Independent	Chairman of the Bank of Greece, appointed by King George II as Prime Minister. Committed suicide upon the entrance of the German troops in Athens.
	George II; Γεώργιος Β΄ (1890–1947)	—	18 April 1941	21 April 1941	3 days	Independent	King George II was de facto Prime Minister after Koryzis' suicide, and while the prospective candidacies of Konstantinos Kotzias, Alexandros Mazarakis-Ainian, and Emmanouil Tsouderos were being discussed; on 20 April, admiral Alexandros Sakellariou was sworn in as Deputy Prime Minister with George II as head of government.
	Emmanouil Tsouderos; Εμμανουήλ Τσουδερός (1882–1956)	—	21 April 1941	14 April 1944	2 years, 359 days	Independent	Chairman of the Bank of Greece, appointed by King George II. In exile to London and after in Cairo from 23 May 1941.
Collaborationist governments during the occupation by Axis powers (1941–1944)
	Georgios Tsolakoglou; Γεώργιος Τσολάκογλου (1886–1948)	—	30 April 1941	2 December 1942	1 year, 216 days	Military	Lt. General. Signed, on his own initiative, the unconditional surrender of the Hellenic Army to the Nazis in April 1941. First head of the collaborationist government under Axis occupation. Resigned over the fiscal exploitation of Greece by the occupying powers.
	Konstantinos Logothetopoulos; Κωνσταντίνος Λογοθετόπουλος (1878–1961)	—	2 December 1942	7 April 1943	126 days	Independent	Professor of Medicine. Second head of the collaborationist government under Axis occupation. Dismissed by the Germans as ineffective.
	Ioannis Rallis; Ιωάννης Ράλλης (1878–1946)	—	7 April 1943	12 October 1944	1 year, 188 days	People's Party	Third head of the collaborationist government under Axis occupation. Created the Security Battalions, the collaborationist Wehrmacht-equipped paramilitary groups dedicated to the persecution of resistance groups and the support of Nazi occupation troops.
Political Committee of National Liberation ("Mountain Government") (1944)
	Evripidis Bakirtzis; Ευριπίδης Μπακιρτζής (1895–1947)	—	10 March 1944	18 April 1944	39 days	Communist Party	Chairmen of the Political Committee of National Liberation (PEEA), a government in EAM-held territories.
	Alexandros Svolos; Αλέξανδρος Σβώλος (1892–1952)	—	18 April 1944	2 September 1944	137 days	Socialist Party	Chairmen of the Political Committee of National Liberation (PEEA), a government in EAM-held territories.
	Sofoklis Venizelos; Σοφοκλής Βενιζέλος (1894–1964)	—	14 April 1944	26 April 1944	12 days	Liberal Party	Head of the internationally recognized government-in-exile in Cairo.
	Georgios Papandreou; Γεώργιος Παπανδρέου (1888–1968)	—	26 April 1944	3 January 1945	252 days	Democratic Socialist Party of Greece	Head of the internationally recognized government-in-exile in Cairo. Absorbed the PEEA after Lebanon conference in May 1944 and formed government of national unity. Repatriated 18 October 1944. Resigned during the Dekemvriana.
	Nikolaos Plastiras; Νικόλαος Πλαστήρας (1883–1953)	—	3 January 1945	8 April 1945	95 days	Independent (Liberal-leaning)	Retired Lt. General. A distinguished officer known as "The Black Rider" during the Greco-Turkish War of 1919–1922.
	Petros Voulgaris; Πέτρος Βούλγαρης (1884–1957)	—	8 April 1945	11 August 1945	192 days	Military	Rear Admiral.
	Petros Voulgaris; Πέτρος Βούλγαρης (1884–1957)	—	11 August 1945	17 October 1945	192 days	Military	Rear Admiral.
	Archbishop Damaskinos; Αρχιεπίσκοπος Δαμασκηνός (1891–1949)	—	17 October 1945	1 November 1945	15 days	Independent	Archbishop of Athens. Regent and Prime Minister.
	Panagiotis Kanellopoulos; Παναγιώτης Κανελλόπουλος (1902–1986)	—	1 November 1945	22 November 1945	21 days	National Unionist Party	
	Themistoklis Sofoulis; Θεμιστοκλής Σοφούλης (1860–1949)	—	22 November 1945	4 April 1946	133 days	Liberal Party	
	Panagiotis Poulitsas; Παναγιώτης Πουλίτσας (1881–1968)	—	4 April 1946	18 April 1946	14 days	Independent	Senior judge. Interim government.
	Konstantinos Tsaldaris; Κωνσταντίνος Τσαλδάρης (1884–1970)	1946	18 April 1946	2 October 1946	281 days	People's Party	
	Konstantinos Tsaldaris; Κωνσταντίνος Τσαλδάρης (1884–1970)	1946	2 October 1946	24 January 1947	281 days	People's Party	
	Dimitrios Maximos; Δημήτριος Μάξιμος (1873–1955)	—	24 January 1947	29 August 1947	217 days	People's Party	Head of coalition government.
	Konstantinos Tsaldaris; Κωνσταντίνος Τσαλδάρης (1884–1970)	—	29 August 1947	7 September 1947	9 days	People's Party	
	Themistoklis Sofoulis; Θεμιστοκλής Σοφούλης (1860–1949)	—	7 September 1947	18 November 1948	1 year, 290 days	Liberal Party	Four terms, head of coalition governments of all centrist and rightist parties.
	Themistoklis Sofoulis; Θεμιστοκλής Σοφούλης (1860–1949)	—	18 November 1948	20 January 1949	1 year, 290 days	Liberal Party	Four terms, head of coalition governments of all centrist and rightist parties.
	Themistoklis Sofoulis; Θεμιστοκλής Σοφούλης (1860–1949)	—	20 January 1949	14 April 1949	1 year, 290 days	Liberal Party	Four terms, head of coalition governments of all centrist and rightist parties.
	Themistoklis Sofoulis; Θεμιστοκλής Σοφούλης (1860–1949)	—	14 April 1949	24 June 1949	1 year, 290 days	Liberal Party	Four terms, head of coalition governments of all centrist and rightist parties.
Provisional Democratic Government (1947–1950)
	Markos Vafeiadis; Μάρκος Βαφειάδης (1906–1992)	—	24 December 1947	7 February 1949	1 year, 45 days	Communist Party	Heads of Provisional Democratic Government, a Communist rival government formed during the Greek Civil War. Defeated and in exile from 28 August 1949.
	Dimitrios Partsalidis; Δημήτριος Παρτσαλίδης (1905–1980)	—	3 April 1949	October 1950	1 year, 5 months	Communist Party	Heads of Provisional Democratic Government, a Communist rival government formed during the Greek Civil War. Defeated and in exile from 28 August 1949.
	Alexandros Diomidis; Αλέξανδρος Διομήδης (1875–1950)	—	30 June 1949	6 January 1950	190 days	Liberal Party	Vice-president of Sofoulis' government, acting since 24 June after his death, head of the coalition government of all centrist and rightist parties.
	Ioannis Theotokis; Ιωάννης Θεοτόκης (1880–1961)	—	6 January 1950	23 March 1950	76 days	People's Party	Head of caretaker government.
	Sofoklis Venizelos; Σοφοκλής Βενιζέλος (1894–1964)	1950	23 March 1950	15 April 1950	23 days	Liberal Party	
	Nikolaos Plastiras; Νικόλαος Πλαστήρας (1883–1953)	—	15 April 1950	21 August 1950	128 days	National Progressive Centre Union	
	Sofoklis Venizelos; Σοφοκλής Βενιζέλος (1894–1964)	—	21 August 1950	13 September 1950	1 year, 67 days	Liberal Party	
	Sofoklis Venizelos; Σοφοκλής Βενιζέλος (1894–1964)	—	13 September 1950	3 November 1950	1 year, 67 days	Liberal Party	
	Sofoklis Venizelos; Σοφοκλής Βενιζέλος (1894–1964)	—	3 November 1950	27 October 1951	1 year, 67 days	Liberal Party	
	Nikolaos Plastiras; Νικόλαος Πλαστήρας (1883–1953)	1951	27 October 1951	11 October 1952	350 days	National Progressive Centre Union	Tried to heal the rift caused in Greek society by the Greek Civil War.
	Dimitrios Kiousopoulos; Δημήτριος Κιουσόπουλος (1892–1977)	—	11 October 1952	19 November 1952	39 days	Independent	Senior Judge. Head of caretaker government.
	Alexandros Papagos; Αλέξανδρος Παπάγος (1883–1955)	1952	19 November 1952	4 October 1955	2 years, 319 days	Greek Rally	Retired Field Marshal, former Commander-in-Chief of the Greek Armed Forces and former Chief of the Hellenic National Defence General Staff. Died in office.
	Konstantinos Karamanlis; Κωνσταντίνος Καραμανλής (1907–1998)	—	6 October 1955	29 February 1956	2 years, 150 days	Greek Rally/National Radical Union	
	Konstantinos Karamanlis; Κωνσταντίνος Καραμανλής (1907–1998)	1956	29 February 1956	5 March 1958	2 years, 150 days	Greek Rally/National Radical Union	
	Konstantinos Georgakopoulos; Κωνσταντίνος Γεωργακόπουλος (1890–1978)	—	5 March 1958	17 May 1958	73 days	Independent	President of the Hellenic Red Cross and former Minister for National Education. Head of caretaker government.
	Konstantinos Karamanlis; Κωνσταντίνος Καραμανλής (1907–1998)	1958	17 May 1958	20 September 1961	3 years, 126 days	National Radical Union	
	Konstantinos Dovas; Κωνσταντίνος Δόβας (1898–1973)	—	20 September 1961	4 November 1961	45 days	Independent	Retired General and former Chief of the Hellenic National Defence General Staff, head of the Royal Household. Head of caretaker government.
	Konstantinos Karamanlis; Κωνσταντίνος Καραμανλής (1907–1998)	1961	4 November 1961	18 June 1963	1 year, 226 days	National Radical Union	
	Panagiotis Pipinelis; Παναγιώτης Πιπινέλης (1899–1970)	—	19 June 1963	28 September 1963	101 days	National Radical Union	
	Stylianos Mavromichalis; Στυλιανός Μαυρομιχάλης (1902–1981)	—	28 September 1963	8 November 1963	41 days	Independent	President of the Court of Cassation. Head of caretaker government.
	Georgios Papandreou; Γεώργιος Παπανδρέου (1888–1968)	1963	8 November 1963	31 December 1963	53 days	Centre Union	
	Ioannis Paraskevopoulos; Ιωάννης Παρασκευόπουλος (1900–1984)	—	31 December 1963	19 February 1964	50 days	Independent	Vice-chairman of the Bank of Greece. Head of caretaker government.
	Georgios Papandreou; Γεώργιος Παπανδρέου (1888–1968)	1964	19 February 1964	15 July 1965	1 year, 146 days	Centre Union	
	Georgios Athanasiadis-Novas; Γεώργιος Αθανασιάδης-Νόβας (1893–1987)	—	15 July 1965	20 August 1965	36 days	Independent (ex-Center Union)	Failed to achieve parliamentary confidence during the Iouliana.
	Ilias Tsirimokos; Ηλίας Τσιριμώκος (1907–1968)	—	20 August 1965	17 September 1965	28 days	Independent (ex-Center Union)	Failed to achieve parliamentary confidence during the Iouliana.
	Stefanos Stefanopoulos; Στέφανος Στεφανόπουλος (1898–1982)	—	17 September 1965	22 December 1966	1 year, 96 days	Liberal Democratic Center	Failed to achieve parliamentary confidence during the Iouliana.
	Ioannis Paraskevopoulos; Ιωάννης Παρασκευόπουλος (1900–1984)	—	22 December 1966	3 April 1967	102 days	Independent	Vice-chairman of the Bank of Greece. Head of caretaker government.
	Panagiotis Kanellopoulos; Παναγιώτης Κανελλόπουλος (1902–1986)	—	3 April 1967	21 April 1967	18 days	National Radical Union	Head of caretaker government.
Greek junta (1967–1974)
	Konstantinos Kollias; Κωνσταντίνος Κόλλιας (1901–1998)	—	21 April 1967	13 December 1967	236 days	Independent	Senior Judge. Appointed Prime Minister by the military regime after a compromise between the leader of the Greek junta Colonel Georgios Papadopoulos and King Constantine II.
	Georgios Papadopoulos; Γεώργιος Παπαδόπουλος (1919–1999)	—	13 December 1967	8 October 1973	5 years, 299 days	Military	Colonel, leader of the putschist officers and strongman of the military regime. Assumed the office after King Constantine's failed counter-coup on 13 December 1967. Monarchy abolished on 1 June 1973 (confirmed by referendum on 29 July) and presidential republic proclaimed, with himself as President.
	Spyros Markezinis; Σπύρος Μαρκεζίνης (1909–2000)	—	8 October 1973	25 November 1973	48 days	Progressive Party	Attempted democratization. Overthrown by hardliners led by Brigadier Dimitrios Ioannidis.
	Adamantios Androutsopoulos; Αδαμάντιος Ανδρουτσόπουλος (1919–2000)	—	25 November 1973	24 July 1974	241 days	Independent	Appointed Prime Minister by junta strongman Ioannidis.

== Third Hellenic Republic (1974–present) ==
Portrait	Name (Birth–Death)	Election	Term of office			Political party	Government (Coalition)	Notes
Portrait	Name (Birth–Death)	Election	Took office	Left office	Time in office	Political party	Government (Coalition)	Notes
	Konstantinos G. Karamanlis; Κωνσταντίνος Γ. Καραμανλής (1907–1998)	—	24 July 1974	21 November 1974	5 years, 291 days	ERE	K. G. Karamanlis V (National Unity) (ΕRΕ–EK)	Monarchy abolished and parliamentary republic established.
	Konstantinos G. Karamanlis; Κωνσταντίνος Γ. Καραμανλής (1907–1998)	1974	21 November 1974	28 November 1977	5 years, 291 days	New Democracy	K. G. Karamanlis VI	Monarchy abolished and parliamentary republic established.
	Konstantinos G. Karamanlis; Κωνσταντίνος Γ. Καραμανλής (1907–1998)	1977	28 November 1977	10 May 1980	5 years, 291 days	New Democracy	K. G. Karamanlis VII	Monarchy abolished and parliamentary republic established.
	Georgios Rallis; Γεώργιος Ράλλης (1918–2006)	—	10 May 1980	21 October 1981	1 year, 164 days	New Democracy	Rallis	Elected by the parliamentary group following Karamanlis' resignation.
	Andreas Papandreou; Ανδρέας Παπανδρέου (1919–1996)	1981	21 October 1981	5 June 1985	7 years, 254 days	PASOK	A. Papandreou I	
	Andreas Papandreou; Ανδρέας Παπανδρέου (1919–1996)	1985	5 June 1985	2 July 1989	7 years, 254 days	PASOK	A. Papandreou II	
	Tzannis Tzannetakis; Τζαννής Τζαννετάκης (1927–2010)	June; 1989	2 July 1989	12 October 1989	102 days	New Democracy	Tzannetakis (ND–Syn)	Head of a coalition government with Synaspismos.
	Ioannis Grivas; Ιωάννης Γρίβας (1923–2016)	—	12 October 1989	23 November 1989	40 days	Independent	Grivas Caretaker	President of the Court of Cassation. Head of a caretaker government.
	Xenophon Zolotas; Ξενοφών Ζολώτας (1904–2004)	Nov. 1989	23 November 1989	11 April 1990	139 days	Independent	Zolotas Coalition (ND–PASOK–Syn)	Former Governor of the Bank of Greece. Head of a national unity government.
	Konstantinos Mitsotakis; Κωνσταντίνος Μητσοτάκης (1918–2017)	1990	11 April 1990	13 October 1993	3 years, 185 days	New Democracy	Mitsotakis	
	Andreas Papandreou; Ανδρέας Παπανδρέου (1919–1996)	1993	13 October 1993	22 January 1996	2 years, 101 days	PASOK	A. Papandreou III	Resigned due to ill health, died shortly afterwards.
	Konstantinos Simitis; Κωνσταντίνος Σημίτης (1936–2025)	—	22 January 1996	25 September 1996	8 years, 48 days	PASOK	Simitis I	Elected by the parliamentary group after the resignation of ailing Papandreou.
	Konstantinos Simitis; Κωνσταντίνος Σημίτης (1936–2025)	1996	25 September 1996	13 April 2000	8 years, 48 days	PASOK	Simitis II	
	Konstantinos Simitis; Κωνσταντίνος Σημίτης (1936–2025)	2000	13 April 2000	10 March 2004	8 years, 48 days	PASOK	Simitis III	
	Konstantinos A. Karamanlis; Κωνσταντίνος A. Καραμανλής (born 1956)	2004	10 March 2004	17 September 2007	5 years, 210 days	New Democracy	K. A. Karamanlis I	
	Konstantinos A. Karamanlis; Κωνσταντίνος A. Καραμανλής (born 1956)	2007	17 September 2007	6 October 2009	5 years, 210 days	New Democracy	K. A. Karamanlis II	
	George A. Papandreou; Γεώργιος Α. Παπανδρέου (born 1952)	2009	6 October 2009	11 November 2011	2 years, 36 days	PASOK	G. Papandreou	
	Lucas Papademos; Λουκάς Παπαδήμος (born 1947)	—	11 November 2011	16 May 2012	187 days	Independent	Papademos Coalition (PASOK–ND –LAOS until 10.2.2012)	Head of a national unity government.
	Panagiotis Pikrammenos; Παναγιώτης Πικραμμένος (born 1945)	May 2012	16 May 2012	20 June 2012	35 days	Independent	Pikrammenos Caretaker	President of the Council of State. Head of a caretaker government.
	Antonis Samaras; Αντώνης Σαμαράς (born 1951)	June; 2012	20 June 2012	26 January 2015	2 years, 220 days	New Democracy	Samaras (ND–PASOK –DIMAR until 21.6.2013)	
	Alexis Tsipras; Αλέξης Τσίπρας (born 1974)	Jan. 2015	26 January 2015	27 August 2015	213 days	SYRIZA	Tsipras I (SYRIZA–ANEL–OP)	
	Vassiliki Thanou-Christophilou; Βασιλική Θάνου-Χριστοφίλου (born 1950)	—	27 August 2015	21 September 2015	25 days	Independent	Thanou-Christophilou Caretaker	President of the Court of Cassation. Head of a caretaker government. First female Greek Prime Minister.
	Alexis Tsipras; Αλέξης Τσίπρας (born 1974)	Sep. 2015	21 September 2015	8 July 2019	3 years, 290 days	SYRIZA	Tsipras II (SYRIZA–ANEL until 13.1.2019)	
	Kyriakos Mitsotakis; Κυριάκος Μητσοτάκης (born 1968)	2019	8 July 2019	24 May 2023	3 years, 321 days	New Democracy	K. Mitsotakis I	
	Ioannis Sarmas; Ιωάννης Σαρμάς (born 1957)	May 2023	25 May 2023	26 June 2023	32 days	Independent	Sarmas Caretaker	President of the Court of Audit. Head of a caretaker government.
	Kyriakos Mitsotakis; Κυριάκος Μητσοτάκης (born 1968)	June 2023	26 June 2023	Incumbent	3 years, 146 days	New Democracy	K. Mitsotakis II	

== See also ==
- Politics of Greece
- List of heads of state of Greece
- List of cabinets of Greece

== Sources ==
First Hellenic Republic

- Γεώργιος Δ. Δημακόπουλος: "Η διοικητική οργάνωσις κατά την Ελληνικήν Επανάστασιν (1821–1827)" (G.D.Dimakopoulos: The administrative organisation during the Greek War of Independence")
- Γεώργιος Δ. Δημακόπουλος: "Αι Κυβερνητικαί Αρχαί της Ελληνικής Πολιτείας (1827-1833)" (G.D.Dimakopoulos: Hellenic State government authorities (1827–1833))

Kingdom of Greece
