= 1869 Greek parliamentary election =

- 16 May 1869
Party	Leader	Seats
English Party	Thrasyvoulos Zaimis	100
Russian Party	Alexandros Koumoundouros	50
French Party	Dimitrios Voulgaris	30
Independents	–	7
This lists parties that won seats. See the complete results below.
Prime Minister before	Prime Minister after
Dimitrios Voulgaris; French Party	Thrasyvoulos Zaimis; English Party

Parliamentary elections were held in Greece on 16 May 1869. Supporters of Thrasyvoulos Zaimis won a majority of the 187 seats. Zaimis remained Prime Minister, having assumed office on 6 February.

== Results ==
Party	Seats
Supporters of Thrasyvoulos Zaimis	100
Supporters of Alexandros Koumoundouros	50
Supporters of Dimitrios Voulgaris	30
Independents	7
Total	187
Source: Nohlen & Stöver
