= 1872 Greek parliamentary election =

- 25 February 1872

All 190 seats in the Hellenic Parliament 96 seats needed for a majority
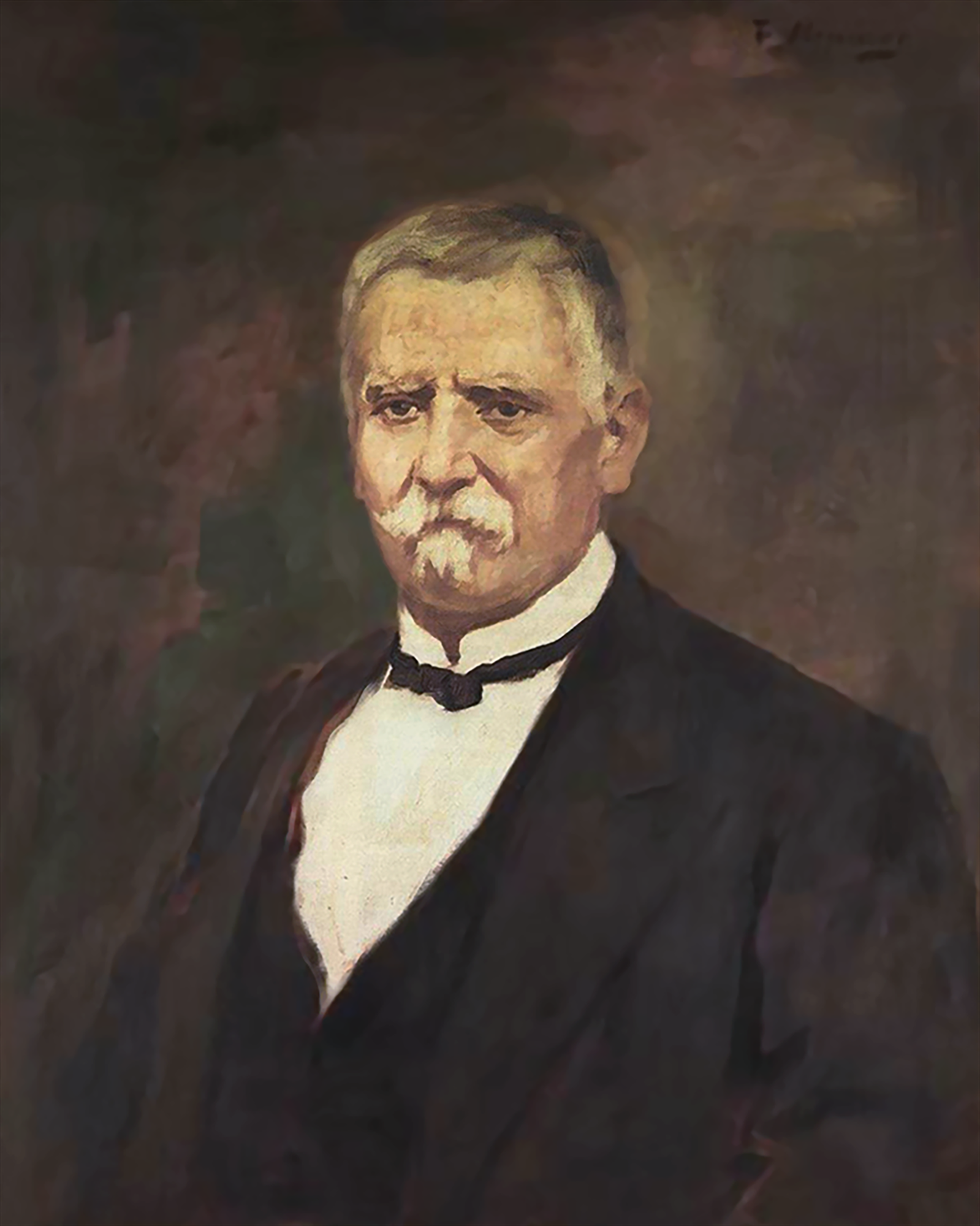

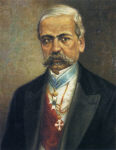

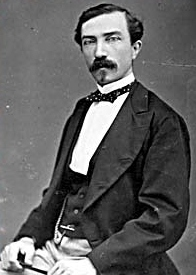
	First party	Second party	Third party
Leader	Alexandros Koumoundouros	Thrasyvoulos Zaimis	Epameinondas Deligeorgis
Party	Nationalist	English	EK
Leader since	1865	1865	1865
Seats won	130	25	15
Prime Minister before election
Thrasyvoulos Zaimis
English
Prime Minister after election
Dimitrios Voulgaris
Nationalist

Parliamentary elections were held in Greece on 25 February 1872. Supporters of Alexandros Koumoundouros and Dimitrios Voulgaris both won 65 seats of the 190 seats. Voulgaris remained prime minister until 20 July, when he was replaced by Epameinondas Deligiorgis.

== Results ==
Party	Seats
Supporters of Alexandros Koumoundouros	65
Supporters of Dimitrios Voulgaris	65
Supporters of Epameinondas Deligiorgis	15
Supporters of Thrasyvoulos Zaimis	15
Supporters of Trikoupis and Lomvardos	10
Independents	20
Total	190
Source: Nohlen & Stöver
