= Spyromilios =

Greek general (1800–1880)

- Σπυρομήλιος
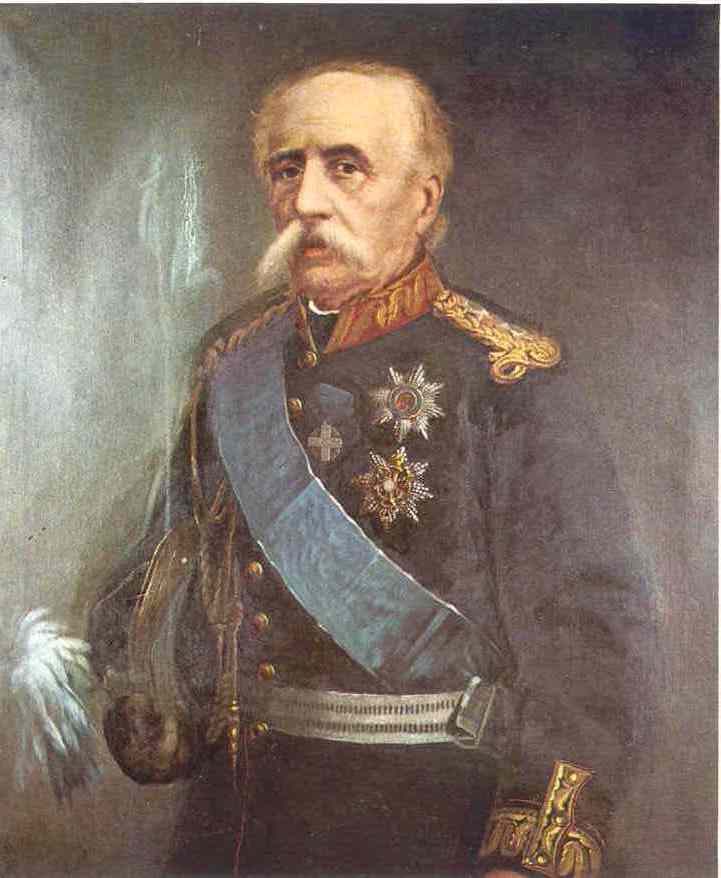
- A portrait of Spyromilios; National Historical Museum, Athens

Speaker of the Hellenic Parliament
- In office 1872
- Monarch: George I
- Prime Minister: Dimitrios Voulgaris

Minister of Military Affairs
- In office 1859, 1862, 1867, 1869
- Monarchs: Otto; George I
- Prime Minister: Athanasios Miaoulis; Ioannis Kolokotronis; Aristeidis Moraitinis; Dimitrios Voulgaris

Personal details
- Born: Spyridon Milios; Σπυρίδων Μήλιος; 1800 Himara, Pashalik of Yanina, Ottoman Empire (now Albania)
- Died: 1880 (aged 79–80) Athens, Kingdom of Greece
- Awards: Grand Cross of the Order of the Redeemer
- Nickname(s): Spyros; Σπύρος

Military service
- Allegiance: First Hellenic Republic; Kingdom of Greece
- Branch/service: Hellenic Army
- Years of service: 1824–1854
- Rank: Lieutenant General
- Battles/wars: Greek War of Independence; Third Siege of Missolonghi; 3 September 1843 Revolution; Crimean War; Epirus Revolt of 1854

Spyridon "Spyros" Milios (Greek: Σπυρίδων "Σπύρος" Μήλιος; 1800–1880), more commonly known as Spyromilios (Greek: Σπυρομήλιος), was a Greek revolutionary, general and politician.

== Early life ==
He was born in Himara, in modern southern Albania, then part of the Ottoman Empire. In 1810 he went to Naples in Italy, where he remained until 1819, studying military theory and learning Latin and French. In 1819, he returned to his homeland to prepare a geographic survey for his school, but was detained by Ali Pasha of Ioannina, who employed him at his court as a military adviser.

== Greek War of Independence ==
In August 1824, after Ali’s death, together with his brothers Nikolaos and Zachos Milios, he travelled south and joined the ongoing Greek War of Independence. In August 1825 he was fighting in the Third Siege of Missolonghi, at the head of a group of 250 armed Himariotes. Named General in September, he was sent as a member of a commission to Nafplion in January 1826, to ask the government for more effective aid to the besieged city. Little was achieved, and although Spyromilios tried to arrange for a British ship to evacuate the garrison, it was too late. Spyromilios was thus forced to remain a spectator of the garrison's disastrous attempt to sally and break through the Ottoman lines, during which his brother Nikolaos was killed.

Afterwards, together with his brother Zachos, he took part in military operations in Central Greece under Georgios Karaiskakis. Under Governor Ioannis Kapodistrias (1828–1829), Spyromilios was placed captain of the personal guard of Dimitrios Ypsilantis.

== After Independence ==
After the end of the War of Independence, Spyromilios settled in Thebes, but as a known supporter of Kapodistrias, he was imprisoned for 9 months in the Palamidi fortress (September 1833-June 1834). Released and reinstated to the army, he became director of the Hellenic Military Academy in 1840-1844. The first Greek to hold that post, he also wrote the Academy's first book of regulations. From this position he participated in the 3 September 1843 Revolution that led to the granting of the first Constitution of Greece. This led him to be considered as an enemy of King Otto, but he soon regained the King's trust. He was appointed General Secretary of the Ministry of Military Affairs in 1848 and adjutant to the King, and in 1850 he was appointed Minister of Military Affairs, a post he kept until 1853. Following the outbreak of the Crimean War, he supported Greek revolts in the Ottoman Empire, despite the neutrality forced upon Greece by Britain and France. His involvement in a revolt in Epirus (1854) led to his dismissal from his offices and his suspension from the Army.

Retired from the Army, he returned to politics from 1859, and served as Minister of Military Affairs in the several cabinets:

- 1859 under Athanasios Miaoulis
- 1862 under Gennaios Kolokotronis
- 1867 under Aristidis Moraitinis
- 1869 under Dimitrios Voulgaris

In 1864-1865, he was a member of the short-lived Council of State, while in 1872, he was elected speaker of the Greek Parliament.

In his memoirs (published in 1926), he gives detailed account of his life. They are an important contemporary document, especially regarding the Siege of Missolonghi.

== Sources ==
- Encyclopedia of Modern Greek Literature. Bruce Merry. Greenwood Press, 2004. ISBN 0-313-30813-6.
- Land and Revolution in Modern Greece, 1800-1881: The Transition in the Tenure and Exploitation of Land from Ottoman Rule to Independence. William W. McGrew. Kent State University Press, 1985. ISBN 0-87338-316-8.
- The Military in Greek Politics: From Independence to Democracy. Thanos Veremis. Black Rose Books, 1997. ISBN 1-55164-104-6.
