= 1874 Greek parliamentary election =

- June 1874

All 190 seats in the Hellenic Parliament 96 seats needed for a majority
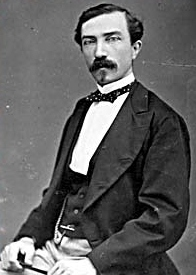

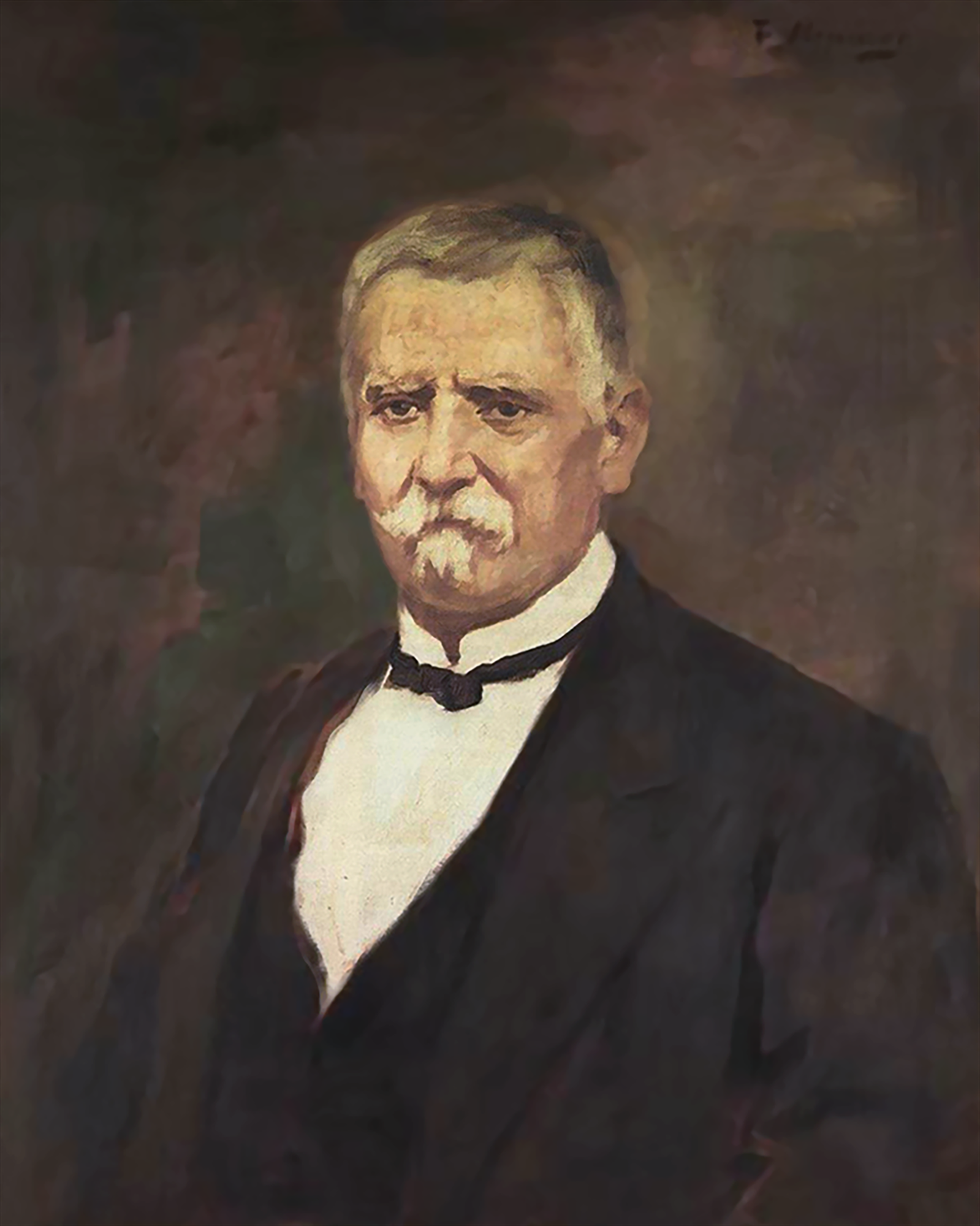
	First party	Second party
Leader	Epameinondas Deligeorgis	Alexandros Koumoundouros
Party	EK	Nationalist
Leader since	1865	1865
Seats won	96	94
Prime Minister before election
Dimitrios Voulgaris
Nationalist
Prime Minister after election
Dimitrios Voulgaris
Nationalist

Parliamentary elections were held in Greece in June 1874. The United Opposition won 96 of the 190 seats. Dimitrios Voulgaris remained Prime Minister.

== Results ==
Party	Seats
United Opposition	96
Supporters of Dimitrios Voulgaris	94
Total	190
Source: Nohlen & Stöver
