= 1875 Greek parliamentary election =

- 18 July 1875
Prime Minister before	Prime Minister after election
Charilaos Trikoupis; Modernist Party	Charilaos Trikoupis; Modernist Party

Parliamentary elections were held in Greece on 18 July 1875. Supporters of Alexandros Koumoundouros emerged as the largest bloc in Parliament, with 80 of the 190 seats. Koumoundouros became Prime Minister on 27 October.

== Results ==
Party	Seats
Supporters of Alexandros Koumoundouros	80
Supporters of Epameinondas Deligiorgis	30
Supporters of Thrasyvoulos Zaimis	25
Supporters of Charilaos Trikoupis	25
Independent	18
Independents	12
Total	190
Source: Nohlen & Stöver
