= 1873 Greek parliamentary election =

- 27 January 1873

All 190 seats in the Hellenic Parliament 96 seats needed for a majority
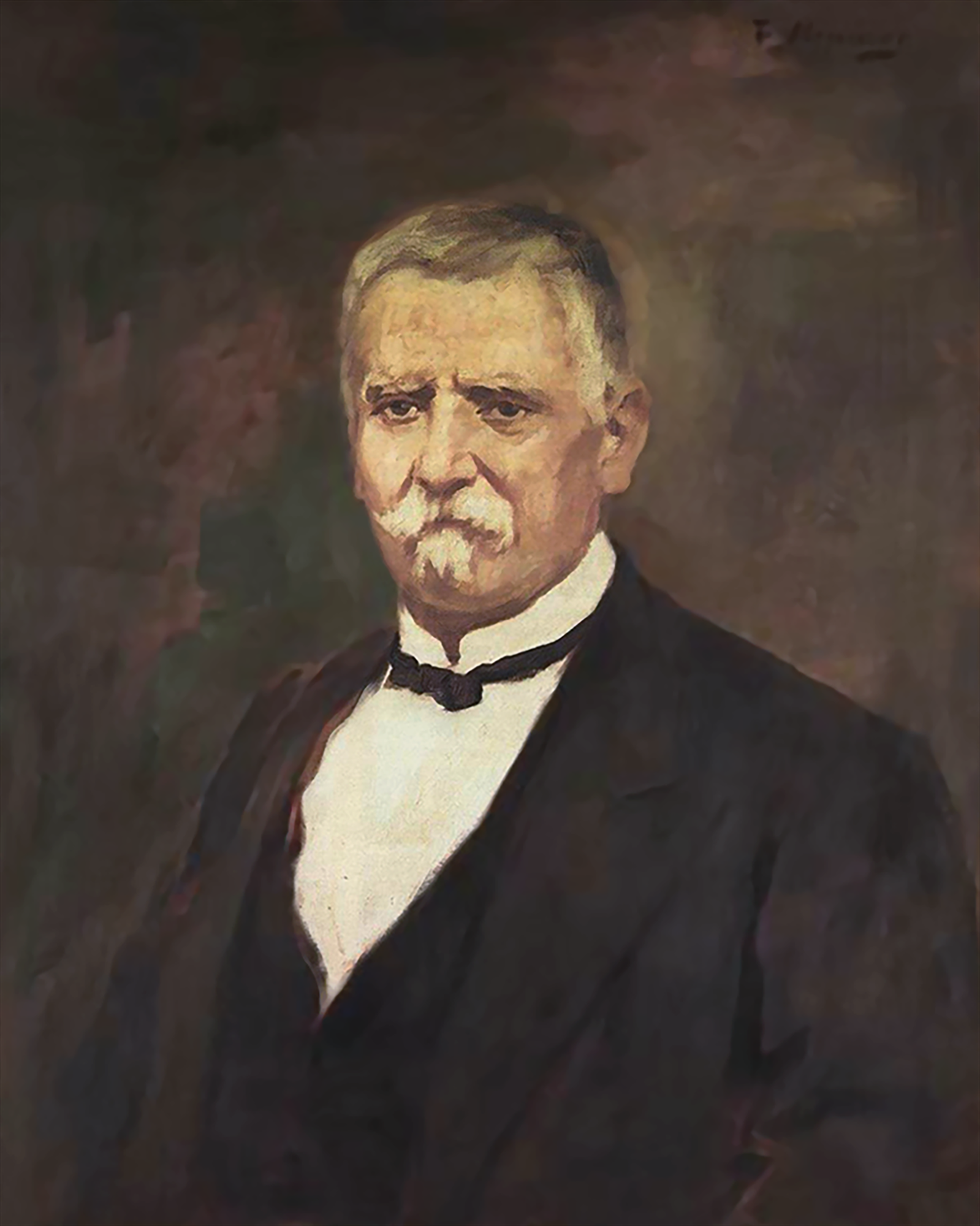

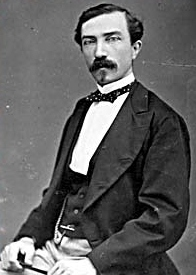
	First party	Second party
Leader	Alexandros Koumoundouros	Epameinondas Deligeorgis
Party	Nationalist	EK
Leader since	1865	1865
Last election	130 seats	15 seats
Seats won	95	85
Seat change	▼35	▲70
Prime Minister before election
Epameinondas Deligeorgis
EK
Prime Minister after election
Epameinondas Deligeorgis
EK

Parliamentary elections were held in Greece on 27 January 1873. The United Opposition won 95 of the 190 seats. Epameinondas Deligiorgis remained Prime Minister.

== Results ==
Party	Seats
United Opposition	95
Supporters of Epameinondas Deligiorgis	85
Independents	10
Total	190
Source: Nohlen & Stöver
