= 1881 Greek parliamentary election =

- 20 December 1881

All 245 seats in the Hellenic Parliament 123 seats needed for a majority
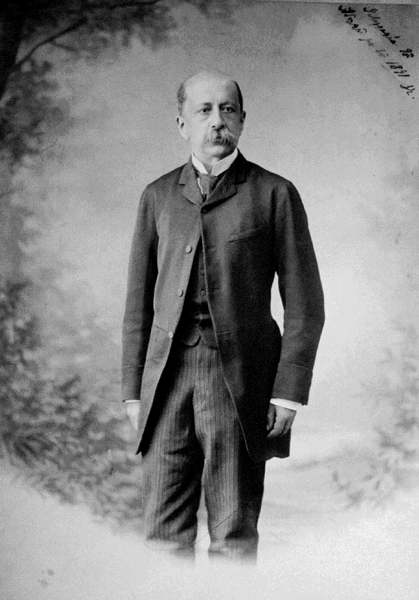

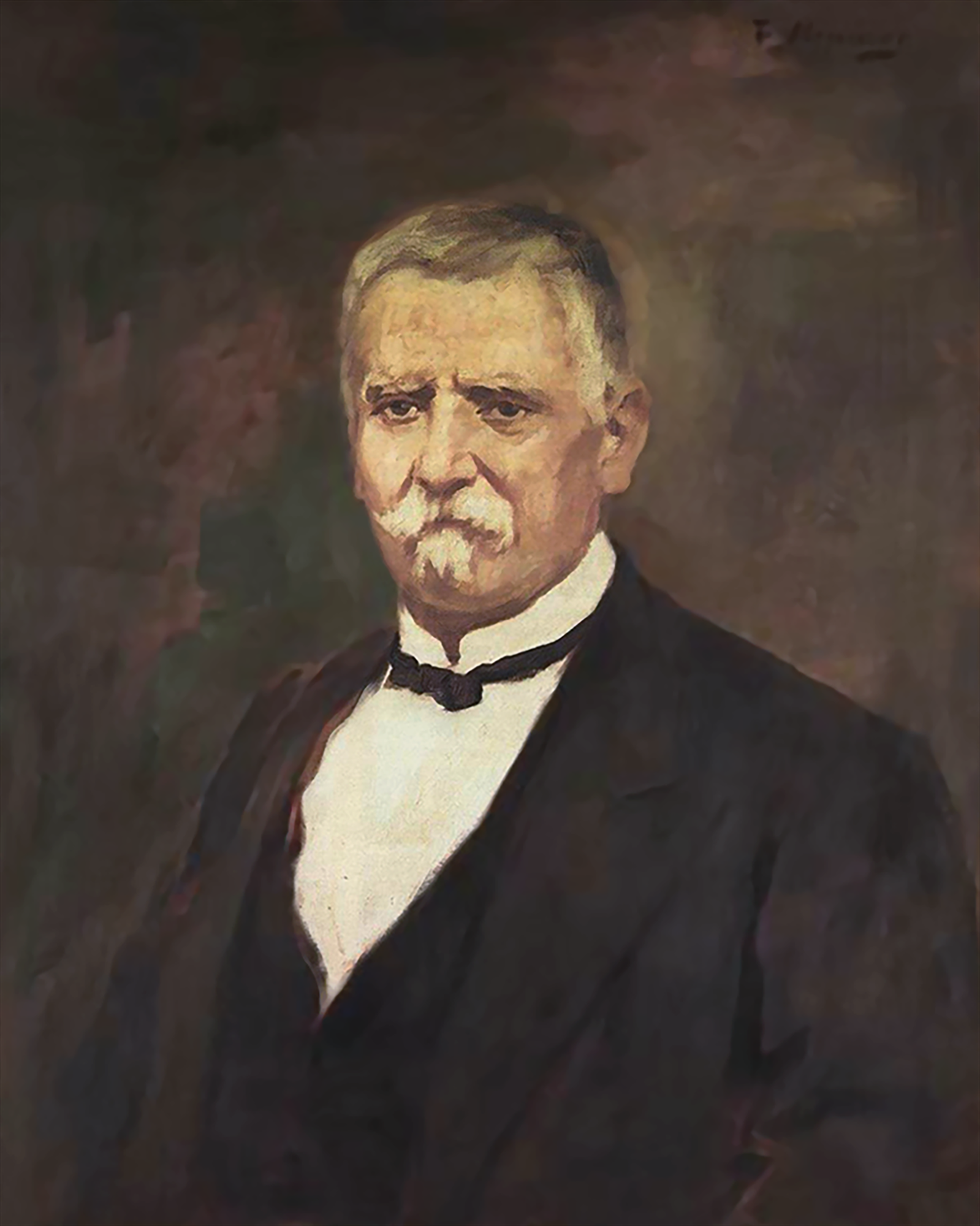

	First party	Second party	Third party
Leader	Charilaos Trikoupis	Alexandros Koumoundouros	Leonídas Deligeórgis
Party	New Party	Nationalist	EK
Leader since	1873	1865	1879
Seats won	125	100	6
Prime Minister before election
Alexandros Koumoundouros
Nationalist
Prime Minister after election
Alexandros Koumoundouros
Nationalist

Parliamentary elections were held in Greece on 20 December 1881. Supporters of Charilaos Trikoupis emerged as the largest bloc in Parliament, with 125 of the 245 seats. Trikoupis became Prime Minister on 15 March 1882.

As the first election to take place after the annexation of Thessaly, by the terms of the Convention of Constantinople, the resulting parliament was the first to feature two Muslim MPs, representing the region's sizeable Muslim minority. Nevertheless, despite the political equality guaranteed to them officially, several Muslim and Jewish citizens in Thessaly complained to the authorities that they were prevented from voting, either by being denied access to the voting stations, or not being registered in the electoral lists. The situation was further confused since the Muslim inhabitants of the area were not necessarily Greek citizens, with many opting to retain their Ottoman citizenship. In addition, according to press reports, the Ottoman authorities announced that any Muslim running for office in the elections would automatically lose their citizenship.

== Results ==
Party	Seats
Supporters of Charilaos Trikoupis	125
Supporters of Koumoundouros and Deligiannis	100
Supporters of Leonidas Deligiorgis	6
Democrats	5–7
Independents	7–9
Total	245
Source: Nohlen & Stöver
