= Provisional Cabinet of Konstantinos Kanaris =

The Provisional Cabinet of Konstantinos Kanaris (12 February 1844 – 30 March 1844) was a provisional government formed when the government of Andreas Metaxas lost the support of the National Assembly of 1843.

== Members of the Cabinet ==
- Konstantinos Kanaris, President of the Council of Ministers and Secretary for Naval Affairs (member of the Russian Party)
- Andreas Londos, Secretary for Military Affairs and for the Interior
- Drosos Mansolas, Secretary for Foreign Affairs and Secretary for the Royal Household and Finance
- Leon Melas, Secretary for Justice and for Religious Affairs and Public Education
- Georgios Kountouriotis, President of the Council of State (member of the French Party)
