= 1856 Greek parliamentary election =

- 6 October 1856
Prime Minister before	Prime Minister after
Dimitrios Voulgaris	Dimitrios Voulgaris

Parliamentary elections were held in Greece on 6 October 1856. Supporters of Dimitrios Voulgaris won a majority of the 138 seats. However, Voulgaris remained Prime Minister only until 25 November the following year, when he was replaced by Athanasios Miaoulis.
