= 1861 Greek parliamentary election =

- 16 January 1861
Prime Minister before	Prime Minister after
Athanasios Miaoulis	Athanasios Miaoulis

Parliamentary elections were held in Greece on 16 January 1861. Supporters of the Athanasios Miaoulis-led coalition won a majority of the 138 seats. Miaoulis remained Prime Minister.
