= 1859 Greek parliamentary election =

- 1 August 1859
Prime Minister before	Prime Minister after
Athanasios Miaoulis	Athanasios Miaoulis

Parliamentary elections were announced in Greece on 1 August 1859. The elections took place in September and the first days of October. Supporters of Athanasios Miaoulis won a majority of the 139 seats. Miaoulis remained Prime Minister. The Sixth Parliamentary session was announced on 7 October and convened on 28 October. There were extensive reports of inappropriate interference by government and state officials.

== Results ==
Party	Seats
Supporters of Athanasios Miaoulis	120
Independents	19
Total	139
Source: Nohlen & Stöver
