= Expulsion of Otto of Greece =

1862 military uprising in Greece

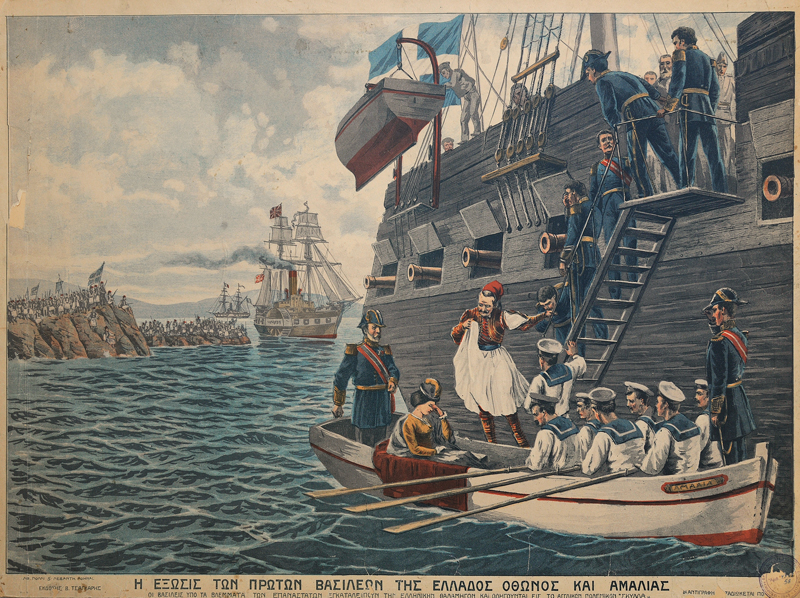
- King Otto and Queen Amalia embarking on HMS Scylla.
Date	18 – 23 October 1862
Location	Kingdom of Greece
Result	Revolutionary victory: King Otto is overthrown; Prince Wilhelm appointed as King of the Hellenes in March 1863

King Otto of Greece was deposed in a popular insurrection in October 1862. Starting on 18 October in Vonitsa, it soon spread to other cities and reached Athens on 22 October.

== Background ==
King Otto had ruled the Kingdom of Greece since May 1832. Greece had been transformed into a constitutional monarchy in the aftermath of the 3 September 1843 Revolution. However, Otto continued to intervene in the internal affairs of the state by frequently dissolving Parliament and ignoring large-scale electoral fraud when it benefited him and his allies. By 1861, Greek opposition had grown into a broad front, which largely saw parliamentary politics as futile and instead wished to remove Otto from power. In March 1861, Greek authorities uncovered a plot to overthrow the King, consisting mainly of university students and low ranking military officers. On 6 September, student Aristeidis Dosios attempted to assassinate Queen Amalia. The following day, a crackdown was launched on the anti-Ottonian opposition.

On 1 February 1862, an insurrection broke out in Nafplion, led by Theodoros Grivas, Dimitrios Grivas, Petros A. Mavromichalis and Dimitrios Botsaris. Soon, the revolt started to spread to Santorini, Hydra, Syros, Tripolis, Argos and Messenia. However, the royal authorities quickly managed to restore control by thwarting an outbreak of the revolt in Athens and mobilising a large body of troops to suppress it. The revolt was suppressed by 20 March.

== Revolution ==
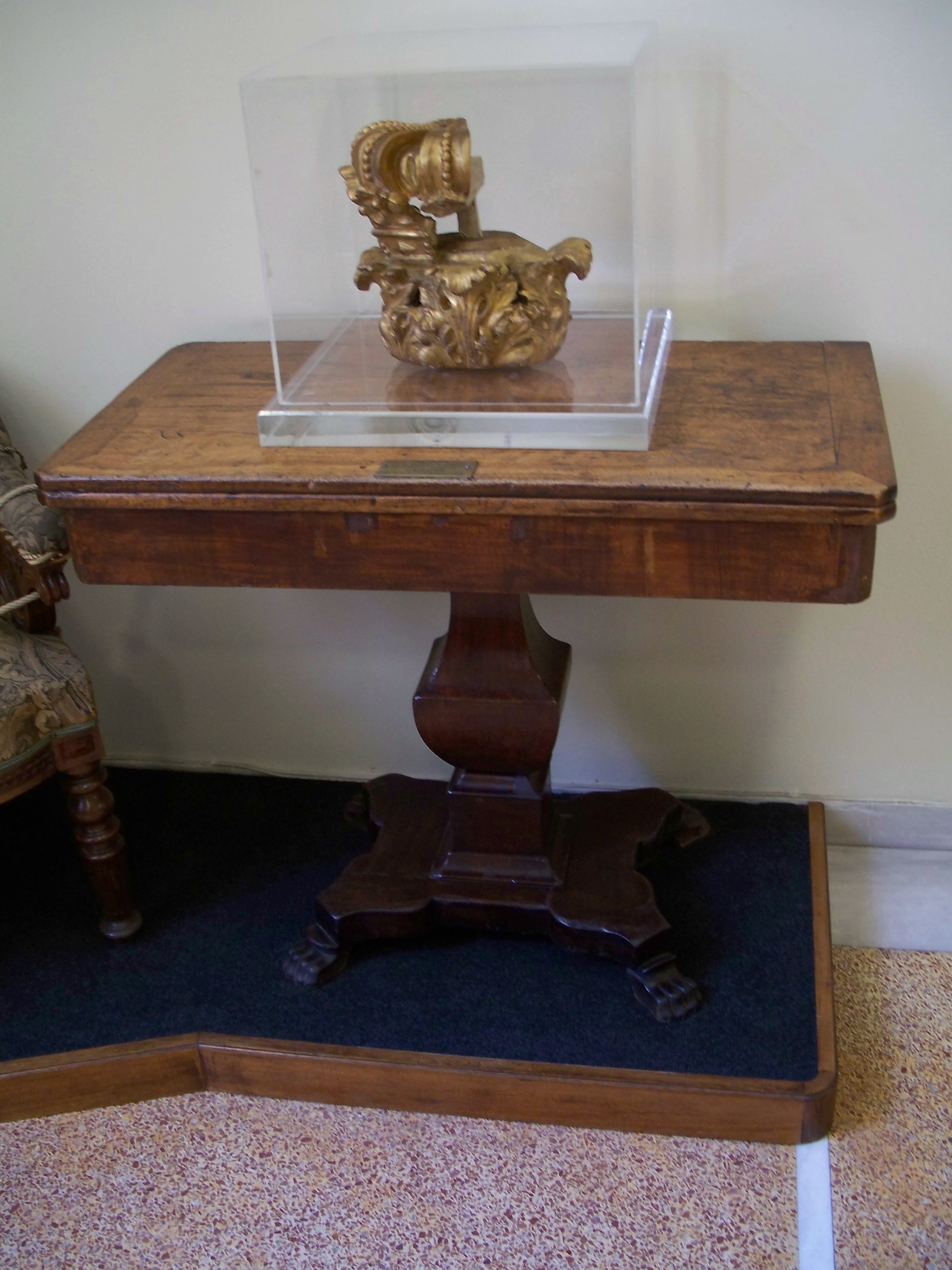
The table on which the expulsion of King Otto was signed and a decorative crown from the royal palace that was damaged during the revolution

On 16 October, King Otto and Queen Amalia left for a royal visit to the Peloponnese in order to strengthen the bonds between the Greek people and the Crown. However, an insurrection erupted two days later in Vonitsa, on the Ambracian Gulf, led by Dimitrios Voulgaris, Konstantinos Kanaris and Benizelos Roufos. Soon, the insurrection spread to Missolonghi and Patras. On 22 October, the insurrection reached the capital, Athens and a provisional government was established, with Rouphos as the prime minister. On the following day, the revolutionaries proclaimed the deposition of the royal couple and convened an assembly for the election of a new monarch.

The royal couple was then brought from Kalamata by the Minister of Police and placed under the protection of a British warship, HMS Scylla. At the same time, the property of the royal couple, which remained in the Old Royal Palace, was inventoried before being returned to their legitimate possessors. Advised by ambassadors of the Great Powers, Otto and Amalia left Greece and went into exile. In spite of everything, the King refused to abdicate and did not envision his departure as being definitive.

== Aftermath ==
The Constitution of 1864 was established to implement the transition from a constitutional monarchy to a crowned republic under a new sovereign.

== See also ==
- 1862 Greek head of state referendum
- 1862 Greek legislative election
