= 1912 Greek parliamentary election =

- 24 March [O.S. 11 March] 1912

All 181 seats in the Hellenic Parliament 91 seats needed for a majority
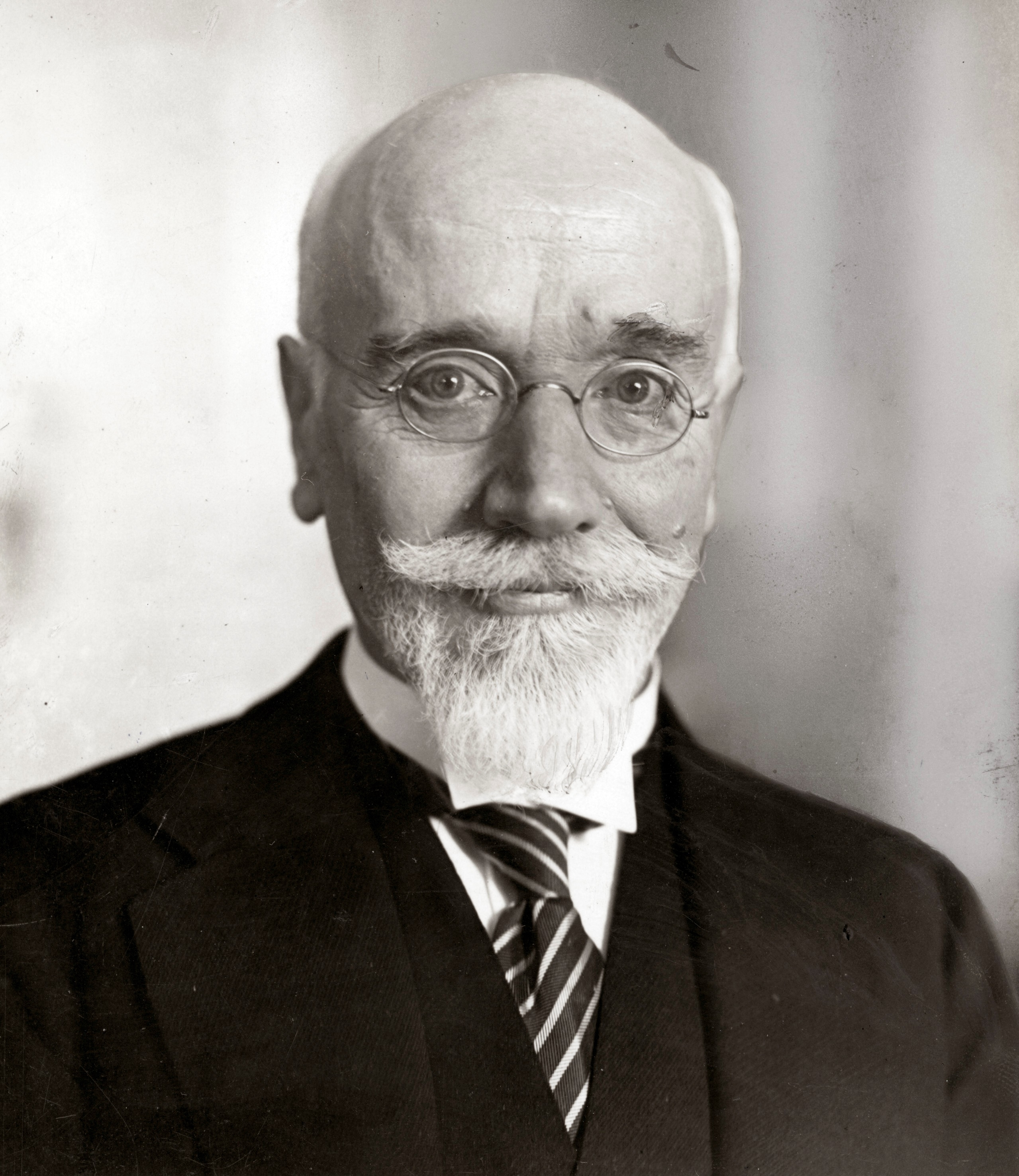

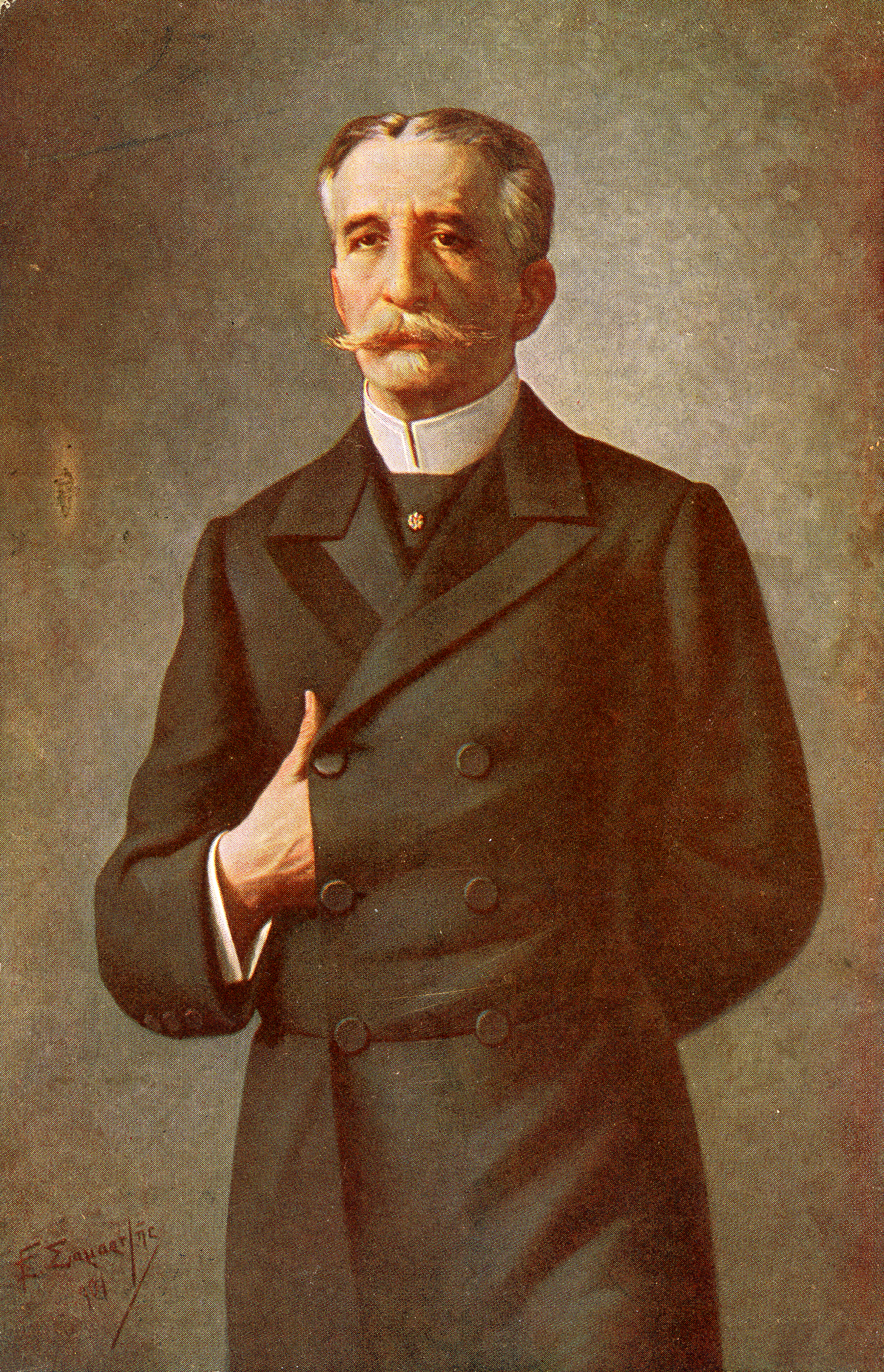

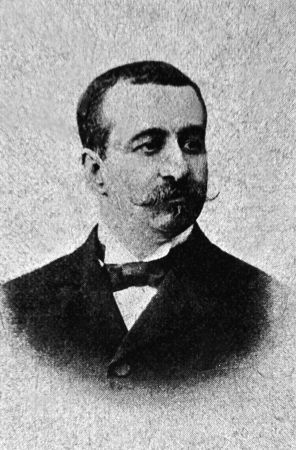

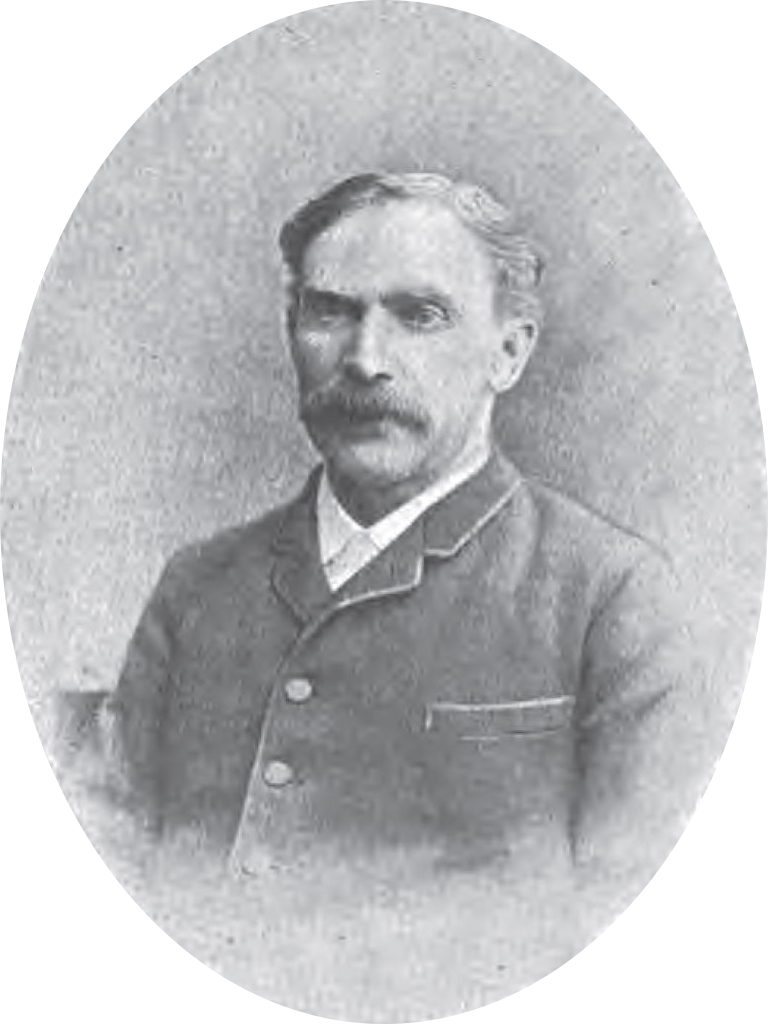

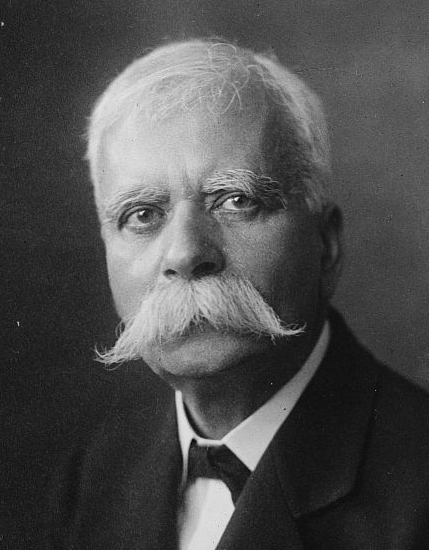
	First party	Second party	Third party
Leader	Eleftherios Venizelos	Georgios Theotokis	Kyriakoulis Mavromichalis
Party	Liberal	Theotokis supporters	Mavromichalis supporters
Seats won	146	10	8
	Fourth party	Fifth party
Leader	Dimitrios Rallis	Alexandros Zaimis
Party	Rallis supporters	Zaimis supporters
Seats won	6	3
Prime Minister before election
Eleftherios Venizelos
Liberal Party (Greece)
Prime Minister after election
Eleftherios Venizelos
Liberal Party (Greece)

Parliamentary elections were held in Greece on 24 March [O.S. 11 March] 1912. The Liberal Party won 146 of the 181 seats. Eleftherios Venizelos remained Prime Minister, having assumed office on 18 October 1910.

== Results ==
Party	Seats
Liberal Party	146
Supporters of Georgios Theotokis	10
Supporters of Kyriakoulis Mavromichalis	8
Supporters of Dimitrios Rallis	6
Supporters of Alexandros Zaimis	3
Sociologists	2
Independents	6
Total	181
Source: Nohlen & Stöver
