= National Committee =

National Committee Εθνικό Κομιτάτο
- Leader: Epameinondas Deligiorgis
- Founded: 1865
- Dissolved: 1879
- Headquarters: Athens
- Newspaper: "The Orient's Future"
- Ideology: Liberalism; Parliamentarism; Cultural imperialism
- Political position: Centre

The National Committee (Greek: Εθνικό Κομιτάτο) was a Greek political party founded by Epameinondas Deligiorgis.

The party was founded in 1865, and was composed by young revolutionaries who helped to overthrow King Otto, ending his semi-absolutist reign. The party wasn't linked with the traditional parties (English, French and Russian), and wasn't associated with a particular ideology. The National Committee tried to establish a strong parliamentary system, along with economic modernization, supporting the creation of infrastructures. It also campaigned for a military reform and a cultural expansion in the Ottoman Empire.

However, the absence of a strong party's apparatus caused its dissolution after Deligiorgis' death in 1879.
