= 1862 Greek parliamentary election =

- 24–27 November 1862

Parliamentary elections were held in Greece between 24 and 27 November 1862. The elected Parliament was also responsible for drawing up a new constitution. Dimitrios Voulgaris became Prime Minister on 23 December as head of the Provisional Government.
