= Zinovios Valvis =

Prime Minister of Greece

- Ζηνόβιος Βάλβης
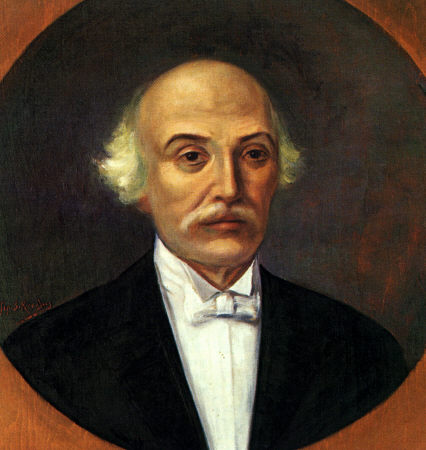

Prime Minister of Greece
- In office 16 April 1864 – 26 July 1864
- Monarch: George I
- Preceded by: Konstantinos Kanaris
- Succeeded by: Konstantinos Kanaris
- In office 11 February 1863 – 25 March 1863
- Monarch: Interregnum
- Preceded by: Aristeidis Moraitinis
- Succeeded by: Diomidis Kyriakos

Minister for Finance
- In office 28 July 1849 – 10 May 1850
- Preceded by: Lykourgos Krestenitis
- Succeeded by: Anastasios Lontos

Minister for Justice
- In office 12 October 1849 – 10 May 1850
- Preceded by: Dimitrios Kallergis
- Succeeded by: Nikolaos Chrisogelos

Personal details
- Born: 23 December 1800 Missolonghi, Ottoman Empire (modern Greece)
- Died: 25 August 1886 (aged 85) Missolonghi, Greece
- Party: Independent
- Education: Halki seminary University of Pisa

Zinovios Zafirios I. Valvis (Greek: Ζηνόβιος-Ζαφείριος Ι. Βάλβης; 23 December 1800 – 25 August 1886) was a Greek politician and Prime Minister of Greece. Valvis was born in 1800 in Missolonghi. He first studied theology at the Theological School of Halki but switched to law, furthering his studies in Pisa, Italy. Valvis married Arsinoe Ratzikosta and fathered nine children. He twice served as prime minister but fell on hard times in his old age, dying impoverished in 1872 after refusing a state pension so as not to be a burden on the Greek state. Zinovios Valvis was the brother of Dimitrios Valvis who also served as prime minister. He died in Missolonghi in 1886.

Political offices
Preceded by Aristeidis Moraitinis	Prime Minister of Greece; 11 February – 25 March 1863	Succeeded by Diomidis Kyriakos
Preceded by Konstantinos Kanaris	Prime Minister of Greece; 16 April – 26 July 1864	Succeeded by Konstantinos Kanaris
