= Aristeidis Moraitinis =

Prime minister of Greece (1806–1875)

- Αριστείδης Μωραïτίνης
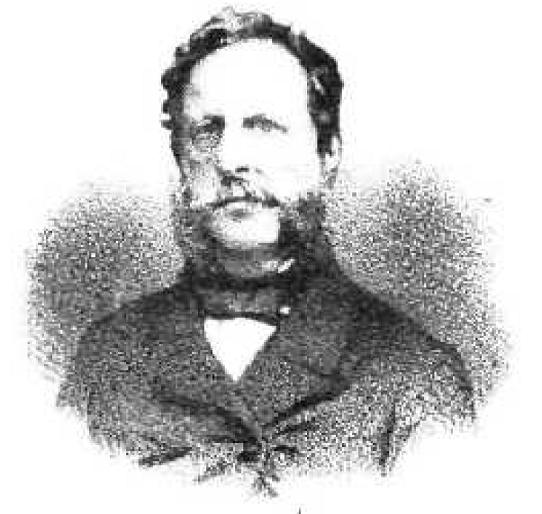

Prime Minister of Greece (Caretaker)
- In office 20 December 1867 – 25 January 1868
- Monarch: George I
- Preceded by: Alexandros Koumoundouros
- Succeeded by: Dimitrios Voulgaris
- In office 9 February 1863 – 11 February 1863
- Monarch: Interregnum
- Preceded by: Dimitrios Voulgaris
- Succeeded by: Zinovios Valvis

Personal details
- Born: 1806 Smyrna, Ottoman Empire
- Died: 1875 Athens, Kingdom of Greece

Aristeidis Moraitinis (Greek: Αριστείδης Μωραïτίνης; 1806–1875) was born in Smyrna, Ottoman Empire (now İzmir, Turkey). He was educated in France. During the reign of King Otto, Moraitinis was a staunch member of the French Party. He served as the Caretaker Prime Minister of Greece (in his capacity as President of the National Assembly) for a few days in February 1863 during the period between the coup d'état against King Otto and the arrival of the new Danish-born Prince William, who would be known in Greece as King George I. Moraitinis was made Caretaker Prime Minister a second time for a little over a month in 1868 (in his capacity as President of the Court of Cassation). He died in Athens 1875.

Political offices
Preceded by Dimitrios Voulgaris	Prime Minister of Greece; 9 - 11 February 1863	Succeeded by Zinovios Valvis
Preceded by Alexandros Koumoundouros	Prime Minister of Greece; 20 December 1867 - 25 January 1868	Succeeded by Dimitrios Voulgaris
