= English Party =

English Party Αγγλικό Κóμμα
- Leader: Alexandros Mavrokordatos; Spyridon Trikoupis; Kostas Botsaris; Benizelos Roufos; Thrasyvoulos Zaimis
- Founded: 1825; 201 years ago
- Dissolved: 1865; 161 years ago
- Merged into: Modernist Party (de facto)
- Headquarters: Athens
- Ideology: Liberalism; Monarchism; Constitutionalism; Anglophilia (diplomatic)
- Political position: Centre-right
- Religion: Greek Orthodox Church

The English Party (Greek: Αγγλικό Κóμμα, romanized: Agglikó Kómma) was one of the three informal early Greek parties that dominated the political history of the First Hellenic Republic and the first years of the Kingdom of Greece during the early 19th century, the other two being the Russian Party and the French Party.

== History and party development ==
The creation and evolution of these parties was the effect of the interest that the three Great Powers (the United Kingdom, France and Russia) displayed for Greek affairs. As a result, they counted on the hope that Greeks had, that by supporting them those countries would also help the Greek Kingdom to fulfill its expectations for economic progress and territorial expansion.

The establishment of the English Party should probably be considered the action that some leaders of the Greek War of Independence took in June 1825, urged by Prince Alexander Mavrocordatos and Georgios Kountouriotis, to compose a letter, whereby Greece applied for protection to the United Kingdom.

The party lacked support in mainland Greece but was very powerful among the Phanariotes and the wealthy shipowners of the Aegean Islands. During Ioannis Kapodistrias' period it lost much of its influence due to the establishment of the other parties (French and Russian factions) and it was the main force of the opposition.

It regained most of it after the arrival of King Otto, since the political sympathies of the principal regent, Josef Ludwig von Armansperg, lay with Britain.

Its unquestioned leader was Prince Alexander Mavrocordatos, and the party quickly started to decline in influence after his death in 1865.
