= Russian Party =

Napist Party κόμμα των Ναπαίων
- Historical leaders: Augustinos Kapodistrias; Andreas Metaxas; Theodoros Kolokotronis; Konstantinos Kanaris; Nikitaras Stamatelopoulos; Alexandros Koumoundouros
- Founded: 1825
- Dissolved: 1865
- Merged into: National Party
- Headquarters: Athens
- Ideology: Populism; Centralization; Social conservatism Russophilia (diplomatic)
- Religion: Church of Greece

The Russian Party (Greek: Ρωσικό Κóμμα), presenting itself as the Napist Party ("Dell Party", Greek: κόμμα των Ναπαίων), one of the early Greek parties, was an informal grouping of Greek political leaders that formed during the brief period of the First Hellenic Republic (1828–1831) and lasted through the reign of King Otto. The parties of that era were named after one of the three Great Powers who had together settled the Greek War of Independence in the Treaty of Constantinople (1832). The three rival powers, the Russian Empire, the United Kingdom and July Monarchy France came together in order to check the power of the other two nations.

The Russian Party had considerable power, enjoying privileged access to the Orthodox Church, the state machinery, military leaders, and Peloponnesian political families; but it was also popular with a significant section of the common people who wanted a strong centralized government to crush the power of the Greek shipping magnates and the rest of the business class, which followed the English Party.

== History and party development ==
The Russian Party was more philosophically-grounded than the other two parties. It represented more conservative elements in Greek society and was viewed as being more supportive of the primacy of the Orthodox church in Greek life. It received generous support from the Church and from several military commanders; but its greatest strength were the Peloponnesian families of notables, that enjoyed privileged access to the state machinery. Ioannis Capodistrias, who had served as Foreign Minister in the Russian government, was selected as governor of the newly independent Greek state in 1827. His support came from the Russian representatives in Greece and those Greeks who wanted closer relations with their sister Orthodox country and this grouping was the first modern party in Greece, called the Russian Party.

Meanwhile, Capodistrias' rule and attempts to centralize the government alienated a number of his fellow Greek leaders, most of whom were born in Greece and had fought to free Greece from Ottoman control. They began to form themselves into a rival French Party and English Party. Eventually, the rivalries led to the assassination of Capodistrias. After a period of renewed civil war, King Otto was selected by the three Great Powers to become King of Greece in 1833. During the early period of the monarchy, the three parties remained active, although Otto was an absolute monarch.

When Otto arrived in Greece, he was a minor and thus a regency council made up of three Bavarians ruled in his name. The chief of the Council, Josef Ludwig von Armansperg was a liberal Bavarian and he was perceived as being hostile to the Russian Party.

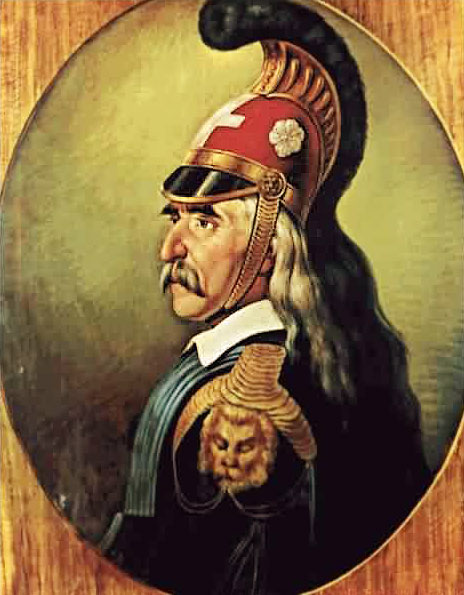
Theodoros Kolokotronis, a key political leader in the Russian Party in the 1830s

In 1833, the leaders of the Russian Party, including Theodoros Kolokotronis, his son Gennaios and Kitsos Tzavelas, were implicated in a plot to seek Russian influence to remove von Armansperg and allow Otto to rule without a regent. They were arrested and imprisoned. Although eventually released, the leaders of the Russian Party were out of power and influence compared to the other parties until 1837.

After this period of decline, the mantle of leadership was placed on Gennaios Kolokotronis, Andreas Metaxas and Konstantinos Oikonomos. The younger Kolokotronis served as a trusted aide-de-camp to King Otto, and began to rehabilitate the Russian Party in the Court.

Once Otto was free of the influence of his regents, he began to favor both Kolokotronis and Kitsos Tzavelas and the period 1838-1839 was seen as a period of Russian ascendancy.

In June 1839, Nikitaras, Georgios Kapodistrias and other members of Russian Party founded the Filorthodoxos Eteria secret society. Its aims included the promotion of the Christian Orthodox faith and the annexation of Ottoman controlled Thessaly, Macedonia and Epirus into the Greek state. In December 1839, Filorthodoxos Eteria's members decided to act upon their plans in anticipation of a rumored Russian army attack on Constantinople. They decided to arrest Otto on 1 January 1840, during the new year's liturgy and force him to either convert to Orthodoxy or abdicate. Soon after the decision to act was taken, one of the plotters Emmanouil Pappas gave the documents revealing the conspiracy's existence. On 23 December having gathered additional evidence, Greek authorities arrested Kapodistrias and Nikitaras. A trial of the plotters began on 11 July 1840, ending in their eventual acquittal. Otto's reaction was limited to replacing Russian Party member and Minister of Internal Affairs Georgios Glarakis with Nikolaos Theocharis. He refused to publicly implicate Russia in the affair or purge Russian Party members from the political scene, as doing so would have revealed his unpopularity and caused animosity in Russia.
