= Benizelos Roufos =

Prime Minister of Greece (1795–1868)

- Μπενιζέλος Ρούφος
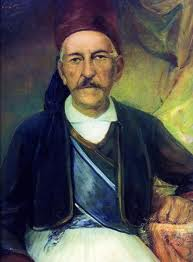

Prime Minister of Greece
- In office 28 November 1865 – 9 June 1866
- Monarch: George I
- Preceded by: Epameinondas Deligeorgis
- Succeeded by: Dimitrios Voulgaris
- In office 29 April 1863 – 18 October 1863
- Monarch: Interregnum
- Preceded by: Diomidis Kyriakos
- Succeeded by: Dimitrios Voulgaris

Personal details
- Born: 27 February 1795 Patras, Morea Eyalet, Ottoman Empire (now Greece)
- Died: 18 March 1868 (aged 73) Patras, Kingdom of Greece
- Relations: Athanasios Kanakaris

Military service
- Allegiance: (Greece) First Hellenic Republic
- Branch/service: Hellenic Army
- Battles/wars: Greek War of Independence

Benizelos Roufos (Greek: Μπενιζέλος Ρούφος; 1795–1868) was a Greek politician and Prime Minister of Greece.

== Biography ==
=== Early life ===
Roufos was born in Patras on 27 February 1795, a scion of the wealthy Roufos-Kanakaris family. He was the son of Athanasios Kanakaris who fought during the Greek War of Independence.

=== Career ===
During the government of Ioannis Kapodistrias (1828–1830), Roufos became governor of Elis. Later he would also serve as Foreign Minister. In 1855, Roufos was elected Mayor of Patras, a post he held for three years.

When King Otto was exiled in 1862 as a result of a revolution, Roufos became one of three viceroys - along with Konstantinos Kanaris and Dimitrios Voulgaris - that held power from 10 October 1862 until 19 October 1863. Roufos served twice as Prime Minister of Greece, with his first term interrupted for a few days in June 1863.

=== Death ===
Roufos died in Patras on 18 March 1868 at the age of 73.

Political offices
Preceded by Diomidis Kyriakos	Prime Minister of Greece; 29 April - 18 October 1863	Succeeded by Dimitrios Voulgaris
Preceded by Epameinondas Deligeorgis	Prime Minister of Greece; 28 November 1865 – 9 June 1866	Succeeded by Dimitrios Voulgaris
