= Gennaios Kolokotronis =

Greek politician and general (1805–1868)

Ioannis Kolokotronis
- Ιωάννης Κολοκοτρώνης
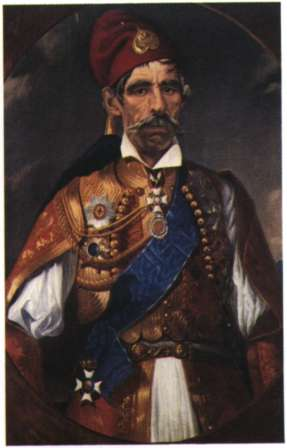
- A portrait of Ioannis Kolokotronis c. 1860

Prime Minister of Greece
- In office 26 May 1862 – 11 October 1862
- Monarch: Otto
- Preceded by: Athanasios Miaoulis
- Succeeded by: Dimitrios Voulgaris

Personal details
- Born: c. 1805 Stemnitsa, Morea Eyalet, Ottoman Empire (now Trikolonoi, Greece)
- Died: 23 May 1868
- Party: Military
- Spouse: Photini Tzavela
- Relations: Konstantinos Kolokotronis (grandfather); Panos Kolokotronis (brother); Apostolis Kolokotronis (cousin); Kitsos Tzavelas (brother-in-law)
- Parent(s): Theodoros Kolokotronis; Aikaterini Karousou
- Awards: Grand Cross of the Order of the Redeemer
- Nickname: Brave (Γενναίος)

Military service
- Allegiance: First Hellenic Republic; Kingdom of Greece
- Branch/service: Hellenic Army
- Rank: Major General
- Battles/wars: Greek War of Independence; Siege of Tripolitsa; Battle of Lalas; Greek Civil Wars

Ioannis Kolokotronis (Greek: Ιωάννης Κολοκοτρώνης; 1805–1868), or Gennaios Kolokotronis (Greek: Γενναίος Κολοκοτρώνης) as he was nicknamed, was a Greek warrior of the Greek War of Independence, General and Prime Minister of Greece.

== Biography ==
He was born at Stemnitsa, Arcadia, but he grew up at Zakynthos. He was a son of Theodoros Kolokotronis and his mother was Aikaterini Karousou (Greek: Αικατερίνη Καρούσου). He acquired the nickname "Gennaios" (meaning "brave") during the Greek War of Independence in which he fought valiantly despite his youth. He took part at the siege of Tripolitsa, together with his father.

During the civil wars, he sided with his father.

Kolokotronis served as the aide-de-camp of King Otto with the rank of Major General, and was appointed by Otto as his last Prime Minister in 1862.

He married the sister of Kitsos Tzavelas, Photini Tzavela and together they had 2 sons and 5 daughters.

He died on 23 May 1868.
