= French Party =

French Party Γαλλικό Κόμμα
- Leaders/ Supporters: Ioannis Kolettis; Yannis Makriyannis; Dimitrios Christidis; Georgios Kountouriotis; Kanellos Deligiannis; Dimitrios Voulgaris
- Founded: 1825
- Dissolved: 1865
- Succeeded by: New Party
- Headquarters: Athens
- Ideology: Liberalism (Greek); Greek nationalism Constitutionalism; Republicanism; Megali Idea; Francophilia (diplomatic); Pro–Louis Orléans
- Political position: Centre

The French Party (Greek: Γαλλικό Κόμμα, romanized: Galliko Komma), presenting itself as the Constitutional Party (Greek: Συνταγματικό Κόμμα), was one of the three informal early Greek parties that dominated the early political history of Modern Greece, the other two being the Russian and the English Party.

== History and party development ==
The creation and evolution of these parties was the effect of the interest that the three Great Powers (the United Kingdom, France and Russia) displayed for Greek affairs. As a result, they counted on the hope that Greeks had, that by supporting them those countries would also help the Greek Kingdom to fulfill its expectations for economic progress and territorial expansion.

The French party began as a political faction founded by Ioannis Kolettis during the Second National Assembly at Astros in 1825. Kolettis was the most powerful political leader emerging from the assembly and that added strength to his faction.

The parties were also defined by the so-called "Three Intrigues" by which each faction supported a post-revolutionary leader of the respective power. The French faction supported the Duke of Nemours, second son of Louis Philippe, future king of France in 1830. The other factions responded by supporting others for the throne.

During the Governorship of Ioannis Kapodistrias, the French party and English party were both opposed to the ruling Russian (or Napist) party. This coalition would continue under the rubric of demanding a written constitution. By 1831 or 1832 as the new Bavarian monarch, Otto was being selected as king, the French party was firmly established by Kolettis.

The party had support in Central Greece, especially Euboea, but was also strong among Peloponesian landowners, such as of the Deligiannis faction.

== Sources ==
- Richard, Clogg (1979). A Short History of Modern Greece. Cambridge University Press. ISBN 978-0-521-32837-1.
- Petropulos, John A. (1968). Politics and Statecraft in the Kingdom of Greece. Princeton University Press.
