= Athanasios Miaoulis =

Greek military officer and Prime Minister (1815–1867)

- Αθανάσιος Μιαούλης
- Athanasios Miaoulis, oil painting, National Historical Museum, Athens.

Prime Minister of Greece
- In office 13 November 1857 – 26 May 1862
- Monarch: Otto
- Preceded by: Dimitrios Voulgaris
- Succeeded by: Gennaios Kolokotronis

Personal details
- Born: 1815 Hydra, Ottoman Empire
- Died: 7 June 1867 (aged 52) Athens, Greece

Athanasios Miaoulis (Greek: Αθανάσιος Μιαούλης; 1815 – 7 June 1867) was a Greek military officer and Prime Minister of Greece. Born in Hydra in 1815, Miaoulis was the son of the famous Greek admiral Andreas Miaoulis, from whom he learned his navigation skills.

== Biography ==
He was the son of the Arvanite admiral Andreas Miaoulis. He was born in Hydra. In 1829 he was given a scholarship at the Bavarian War College in Munich by Ludwig of Bavaria. After his graduation he served in the Royal Navy, until his transfer to the Greek Navy three years later. Because of his fluency in English, he was appointed adjutant to king Otto of Greece. He was later elected as Hydra MP (25 September 1855) and was appointed Minister for Naval Affairs in the government of Dimitrios Voulgaris. Following the resignation of Dimitrios Voulgaris, he was asked by king Otto to replace him. On November 13, he formed a government which remained in power until May 1862 with various cabinet reshuffles.

Public opinion in Greece considered Miaoulis' government, who also maintained his position as Minister for Naval Affairs, to be pro-Austrian and an obedient instrument of the king, which caused the opposition to develop a hostile mood. He resigned in May 1859, after the incident of the Skiadika, but the inability of Otto's chosen, Konstantinos Kanaris, to form a government, led Miaoulis to return to power.

In the elections of that year, Miaoulis was re-elected as prime minister, but the government faced serious consistency issues leading to frequent cabinet reshuffles. In 1860, Miaoulis resubmitted his resignation, which was not accepted by Otto, who dissolved the parliament in November of the same year. Kalergis' refusal to form a government, led to new elections which lasted from December 1860 until March 1861. Miaoulis won again, although there were many reports of vote rigging and electoral terrorism which resulted in several strong opposition candidates to be left out of parliament.

Next was the attempt on Queen Amalia’s life, followed by the revolt of Nafplio. Athanasios Miaoulis resigned after the repression of the movement (25 April 1862) giving his chair to Gennaios Kolokotronis. After the expulsion of King Otto and Queen Amalia, Athanasios Miaoulis followed them abroad. He returned during the coronation of King George I (1863), but he didn't get involved in politics due to lack of public support.

During his spell as prime minister, he continued the work of his predecessor on carrying out different land reclamation projects that would ensure the creation of more arable land, while he saw to the completion of the excavation and bridging of Euripus Strait.

Athanasios Miaoulis died in 1867 in Paris.

Political offices
Preceded by Dimitrios Voulgaris	Prime Minister of Greece; 13 November 1857 – 26 May 1862	Succeeded by Gennaios Kolokotronis
