= Thrasyvoulos Zaimis =

Greek politician and the 21st Prime Minister of Greece (1822–1880)

- Θρασύβουλος Ζαΐμης
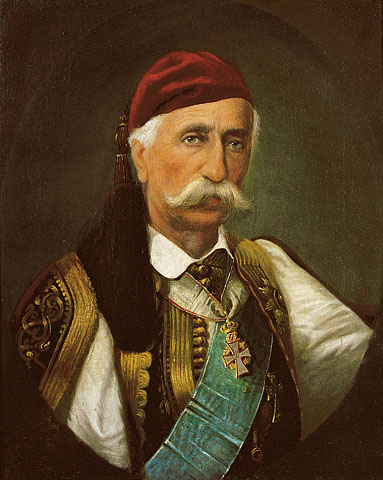

Prime Minister of Greece
- In office 28 October 1871 – 25 December 1871
- Monarch: George I
- Preceded by: Alexandros Koumoundouros
- Succeeded by: Dimitrios Voulgaris
- In office 25 January 1869 – 9 July 1870
- Monarch: George I
- Preceded by: Dimitrios Voulgaris
- Succeeded by: Epameinondas Deligeorgis

Personal details
- Born: 29 October 1822 Kerpini, Kalavryta
- Died: 27 October 1880 (aged 57) Athens
- Children: Alexandros Zaimis
- Education: Studied law in France
- Occupation: Politician, Lawyer

Thrasyvoulos Zaimis (Greek: Θρασύβουλος Ζαΐμης, 1822–1880) was a Greek politician and Prime Minister of Greece. Zaimis was born in Kerpini, Kalavryta on 29 October 1822, the son of Andreas Zaimis, a soldier and government leader before the recognition of Greece's freedom from the Ottoman Empire. Zaimis studied law in France and was first elected to the Hellenic Parliament in 1850. He served four terms as President of Parliament and also as minister in several governments.

In 1864, he was the representative of the Greek government who accepted the cession of the Ionian Islands from the British government, a gift that coincided with the enthronement of King George of Greece. Zaimis served two terms as prime minister and died in Athens on 27 October 1880. Thrasyvoulos Zaimis was the father of Alexandros Zaimis, also a Prime Minister of Greece.

== Notes and references ==
Political offices
Preceded by Dimitrios Voulgaris	Prime Minister of Greece; 25 October 1869 – 9 July 1870	Succeeded by Epameinondas Deligeorgis
Preceded by Alexandros Koumoundouros	Prime Minister of Greece; 28 October - 25 December 1871	Succeeded by Dimitrios Voulgaris
