= Epameinondas Deligeorgis =

Greek freemason, lawyer and politician (1829–1879)

- Επαμεινώνδας Δεληγεώργης
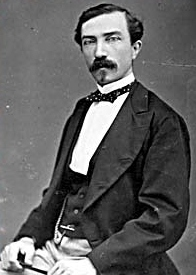
- Epameinondas Deligeorgis in 1870

Prime Minister of Greece
- In office 26 February 1877 – 19 May 1877
- Monarch: George I
- Preceded by: Alexandros Koumoundouros
- Succeeded by: Alexandros Koumoundouros
- In office 26 November 1876 – 1 December 1876
- Monarch: George I
- Preceded by: Alexandros Koumoundouros
- Succeeded by: Alexandros Koumoundouros
- In office 8 July 1872 – 9 February 1874
- Monarch: George I
- Preceded by: Dimitrios Voulgaris
- Succeeded by: Dimitrios Voulgaris
- In office 9 July 1870 – 3 December 1870
- Monarch: George I
- Preceded by: Thrasyvoulos Zaimis
- Succeeded by: Alexandros Koumoundouros
- In office 13 November 1865 – 28 November 1865
- Monarch: George I
- Preceded by: Alexandros Koumoundouros
- Succeeded by: Benizelos Roufos
- In office 20 October 1865 – 3 November 1865
- Monarch: George I
- Preceded by: Alexandros Koumoundouros
- Succeeded by: Dimitrios Voulgaris

Personal details
- Born: 10 January 1829 Tripolis, Greece
- Died: 14 May 1879 (aged 50) Athens, Greece
- Parent: Dimitrios Deligeorgis (father)
- Relatives: Leonidas Deligeorgis (brother)
- Education: National and Kapodistrian University of Athens
- Occupation: Lawyer, politician

Epameinondas Deligiorgis (Greek: Επαμεινώνδας Δεληγεώργης, pronounced [epamiˌnonðas ðeliʝiˈorʝis]; 10 January 1829 – 14 May 1879) was a Greek freemason, lawyer and politician - the youngest Prime Minister of Greece, taking office at the age of 36. His parliamentary activity numbered 13 years and he served as Prime Minister of the country 6 times.

He was born in Tripoli, Arcadia, the son of Dimitrios Deligeorgis, a revolutionary and politician from Missolonghi who participated in the Greek War of Independence. Deligiorgis studied law at the University of Athens. He began practicing law in 1850, and in the years that followed became the idol of the liberal "golden youth". He was elected for the first time as an MP of Missolonghi in 1859 and openly opposed the dynasty, which resulted in his being excluded from the Parliament.

He was not a proponent of the Megali Idea (Great Idea) and thought that a better solution to the Eastern Question would be to improve the condition of the Greeks living in Ottoman-controlled Macedonia, Epirus, Thrace and Asia Minor by liberalising the Ottoman Empire.

According to the writer of his biography : Epaminondas Deligeorgis belonged to a new generation of liberal politicians (Golden Youth) who contributed decisively to the liberalization of the country. Militant demonstrations, dense columns (in journalistic publications such as "Panhellenion", "Athena", "Nea Genea"), participation in military postures, fiery speeches in parliament were some of the characteristics of this generation of politicians, who embodied the concept of the "nation in arms", i.e. the combination of nationalism and radical liberalism. He died in Athens, aged 50.

== Sources ==
- Georg Veloudis: "Delijeorjis, Epaminondas", in Biographisches Lexikon zur Geschichte Südosteuropas. Vol. 1. Munich 1974, pp. 385–387.

Political offices
Preceded by Alexandros Koumoundouros	Prime Minister of Greece; 20 October - 3 November 1865	Succeeded by Dimitrios Voulgaris
Preceded by Alexandros Koumoundouros	Prime Minister of Greece; 13 - 28 November 1865	Succeeded by Benizelos Roufos
Preceded by Thrasyvoulos Zaimis	Prime Minister of Greece; 9 July - 3 December 1870	Succeeded by Alexandros Koumoundouros
Preceded by Dimitrios Voulgaris	Prime Minister of Greece; 8 July 1872 – 9 February 1874	Succeeded by Dimitrios Voulgaris
Preceded by Alexandros Koumoundouros	Prime Minister of Greece; 26 November - 1 December 1876	Succeeded by Alexandros Koumoundouros
Preceded by Alexandros Koumoundouros	Prime Minister of Greece; 26 February - 19 May 1877	Succeeded by Alexandros Koumoundouros
