= Dimitrios Voulgaris =

Greek revolutionary fighter and politician (1802–1877)

- Δημήτριος Βούλγαρης
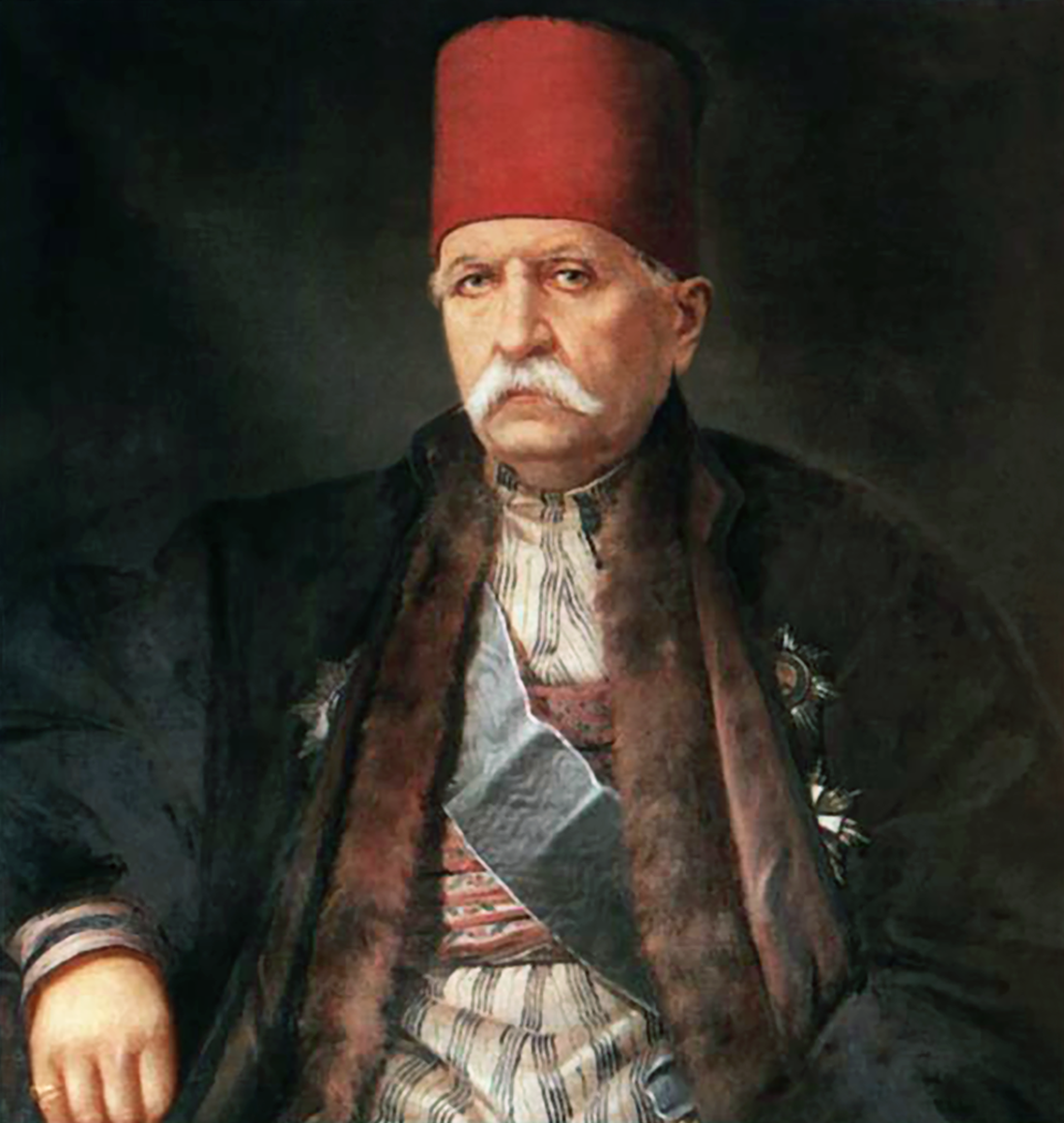

Prime Minister of Greece
- In office 9 February 1874 – 27 April 1875
- Monarch: George I
- Preceded by: Epameinondas Deligeorgis
- Succeeded by: Charilaos Trikoupis
- In office 25 December 1871 – 8 July 1872
- Monarch: George I
- Preceded by: Thrasyvoulos Zaimis
- Succeeded by: Epameinondas Deligeorgis
- In office 25 January 1868 – 25 January 1869
- Monarch: George I
- Preceded by: Aristeidis Moraitinis
- Succeeded by: Thrasyvoulos Zaimis
- In office 9 June 1866 – 17 December 1866
- Monarch: George I
- Preceded by: Benizelos Roufos
- Succeeded by: Alexandros Koumoundouros
- In office 3 November 1865 – 6 November 1865
- Monarch: George I
- Preceded by: Epameinondas Deligeorgis
- Succeeded by: Alexandros Koumoundouros
- In office 25 October 1863 – 5 March 1864
- Monarch: George I
- Preceded by: Benizelos Roufos
- Succeeded by: Konstantinos Kanaris
- In office 11 October 1862 – 9 February 1863
- Monarch: Interregnum
- Preceded by: Gennaios Kolokotronis
- Succeeded by: Aristeidis Moraitinis
- In office 29 September 1855 – 11 November 1857
- Monarch: Otto
- Preceded by: Alexandros Mavrokordatos
- Succeeded by: Athanasios Miaoulis

Personal details
- Born: 20 December 1802 Hydra, Ottoman Greece
- Died: 10 January 1877 (aged 74) Athens, Kingdom of Greece

Military service
- Allegiance: (Greece) First Hellenic Republic; Kingdom of Greece
- Branch/service: Hellenic Navy
- Battles/wars: Greek War of Independence

Dimitrios Voulgaris (Greek: Δημήτριος Βούλγαρης; 20 December 1802 – 10 January 1877) was a Greek revolutionary fighter during the Greek War of Independence of 1821 who became a politician after independence. He was nicknamed "Tsoumpes" ("Τσουμπές") after the distinctive Ottoman-style robe he wore.

== Biography ==
Voulgaris was an Arvanite, born on 20 December 1802 on the island of Hydra in the Saronic Islands. When the War of Independence broke out, he participated in naval operations against the forces of the Ottoman Empire. After independence was achieved, Voulgaris became involved in politics as a bitter opponent of Governor Ioannis Kapodistrias.

In 1843, Voulgaris was appointed to the newly created Senate and in 1847, he became Minister for the Navy. He became the 11th Prime Minister for the first time in 1855 during the Crimean War. He was elected to the post again in elections marked by widespread corruption and fraud.

Voulgaris was involved in the coup against Otto of Greece in October 1862 and became Prime Minister once more. In total, he was Prime Minister eight times; however, his terms in office where characterised by corruption. Finally, in 1875, Charilaos Trikoupis published his famous article "Who is to blame?" ("Τις πταίει;") in the Athens daily "Times" ("Καιροί") concerning the waste and corruption of the government. After a strong public outcry, King George I dismissed Voulgaris. Many of his associates were indicted on a variety of charges and Voulgaris himself took ill and died in Athens on 10 January 1878.

Political offices
Preceded by Alexandros Mavrokordatos	Prime Minister of Greece; 29 September 1855 - 13 November 1857	Succeeded by Athanasios Miaoulis
Preceded by Gennaios Kolokotronis	Prime Minister of Greece; 11 October 1862 - 9 February 1863	Succeeded by Aristeidis Moraitinis
Preceded by Benizelos Roufos	Prime Minister of Greece; 25 October 1863 - 5 March 1864	Succeeded by Konstantinos Kanaris
Preceded by Epameinondas Deligeorgis	Prime Minister of Greece; 3 November 1865 - 6 November 1865	Succeeded by Alexandros Koumoundouros
Preceded by Benizelos Roufos	Prime Minister of Greece; 9 June 1866 - 17 December 1866	Succeeded by Alexandros Koumoundouros
Preceded by Aristeidis Moraitinis	Prime Minister of Greece; 25 January 1868 - 25 January 1869	Succeeded by Thrasyvoulos Zaimis
Preceded by Thrasyvoulos Zaimis	Prime Minister of Greece; 25 December 1871 - 8 July 1872	Succeeded by Epameinondas Deligeorgis
Preceded by Epameinondas Deligeorgis	Prime Minister of Greece; 9 February 1874 - 27 April 1875	Succeeded by Charilaos Trikoupis
