= Alexandros Koumoundouros =

Greek politician (1815–1883)

- Αλέξανδρος Κουμουνδούρος
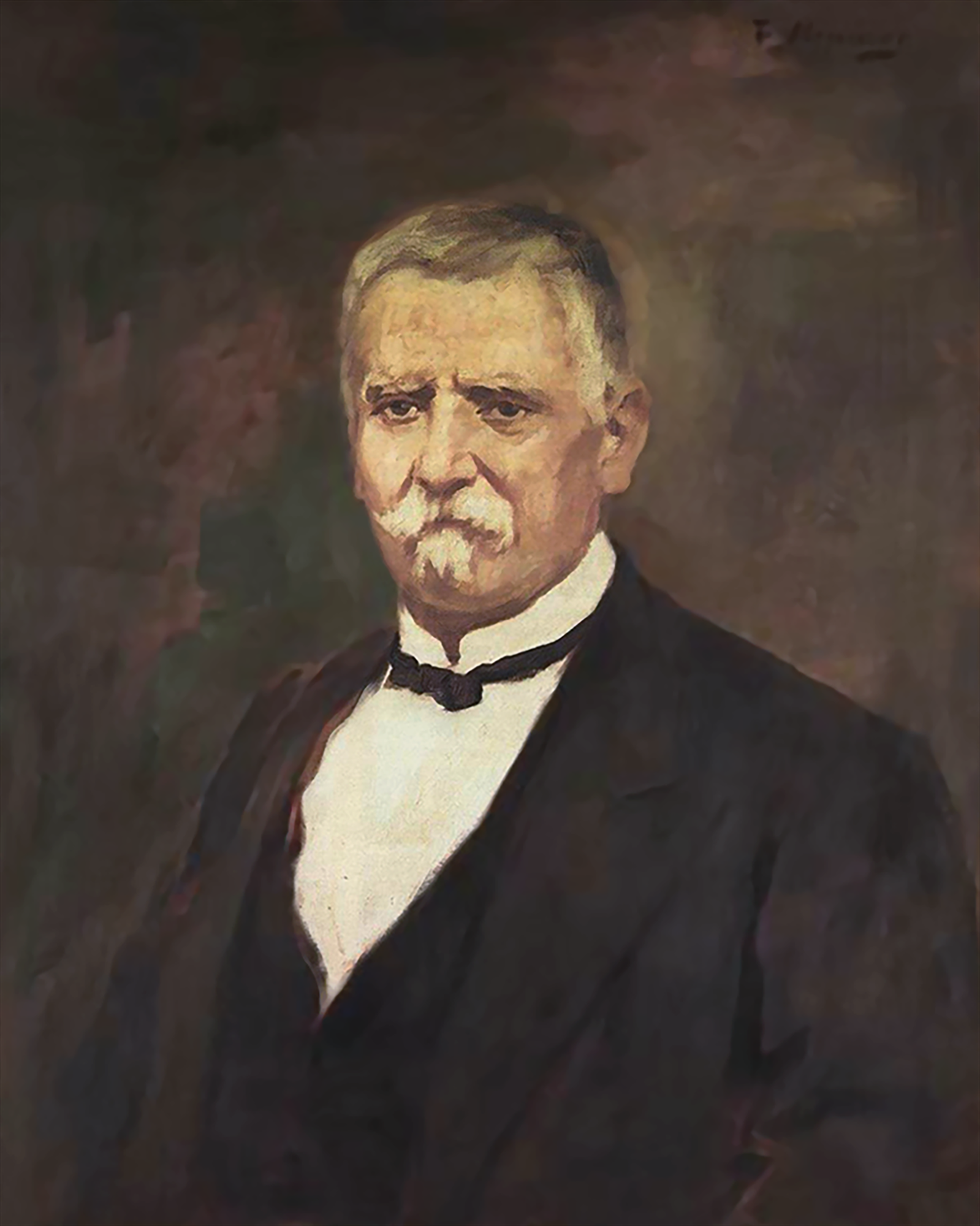

Prime Minister of Greece
- In office 13 October 1880 – 3 March 1882
- Monarch: George I
- Preceded by: Charilaos Trikoupis
- Succeeded by: Charilaos Trikoupis
- In office 26 October 1878 – 10 March 1880
- Monarch: George I
- Preceded by: Charilaos Trikoupis
- Succeeded by: Charilaos Trikoupis
- In office 11 January 1878 – 21 October 1878
- Monarch: George I
- Preceded by: Konstantinos Kanaris (Note: Office remained vacant from 2 September 1877. During the vacancy, junior ministers exercised the duties of prime minister on a rotational basis.)
- Succeeded by: Charilaos Trikoupis
- In office 19 May 1877 – 26 May 1877
- Monarch: George I
- Preceded by: Epameinondas Deligeorgis
- Succeeded by: Konstantinos Kanaris
- In office 1 December 1876 – 26 February 1877
- Monarch: George I
- Preceded by: Epameinondas Deligeorgis
- Succeeded by: Epameinondas Deligeorgis
- In office 15 October 1875 – 26 November 1876
- Monarch: George I
- Preceded by: Charilaos Trikoupis
- Succeeded by: Epameinondas Deligeorgis
- In office 3 December 1870 – 28 October 1871
- Monarch: George I
- Preceded by: Epameinondas Deligeorgis
- Succeeded by: Thrasyvoulos Zaimis
- In office 18 December 1866 – 20 December 1867
- Monarch: George I
- Preceded by: Dimitrios Voulgaris
- Succeeded by: Aristeidis Moraitinis
- In office 6 November 1865 – 13 November 1865
- Monarch: George I
- Preceded by: Dimitrios Voulgaris
- Succeeded by: Epameinondas Deligeorgis
- In office 2 March 1865 – 20 October 1865
- Monarch: George I
- Preceded by: Konstantinos Kanaris
- Succeeded by: Epameinondas Deligeorgis

Personal details
- Born: 4 February 1815 Mani, Ottoman Greece
- Died: 26 February 1883 (aged 68) Athens, Greece
- Party: National Party
- Spouse(s): Aikaterini Konstantinou G. Mavromichali; Efthimia Peroti
- Children: Konstantinos, Maria, Spyridonas, Olga
- Occupation: Lawyer
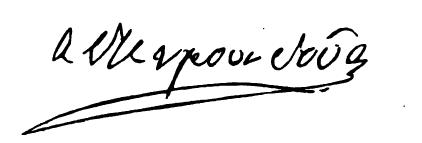
- Signature

Alexandros Koumoundouros (Greek: Αλέξανδρος Κουμουνδούρος; 4 February 1815 – 26 February 1883) was a Greek politician and founder of the National Party, who served as Prime Minister of Greece ten times, from 1865 to 1867, 1870 to 1871, and from 1875 to 1882. Born in Kampos, on the Messenian side of the Mani Peninsula, he was the son of Spyridon-Galanis Koumoundouros, the bey of the area during the last period of the administration of the region by the Ottoman Empire.

He was a political personality famous for his work towards national progress, despite him having been in office during a very unsettled period of Greek history, alongside his longtime political rival Charilaos Trikoupis. At the time of his death, he was the country's longest serving prime minister in non-consecutive terms in office.

== Biography ==
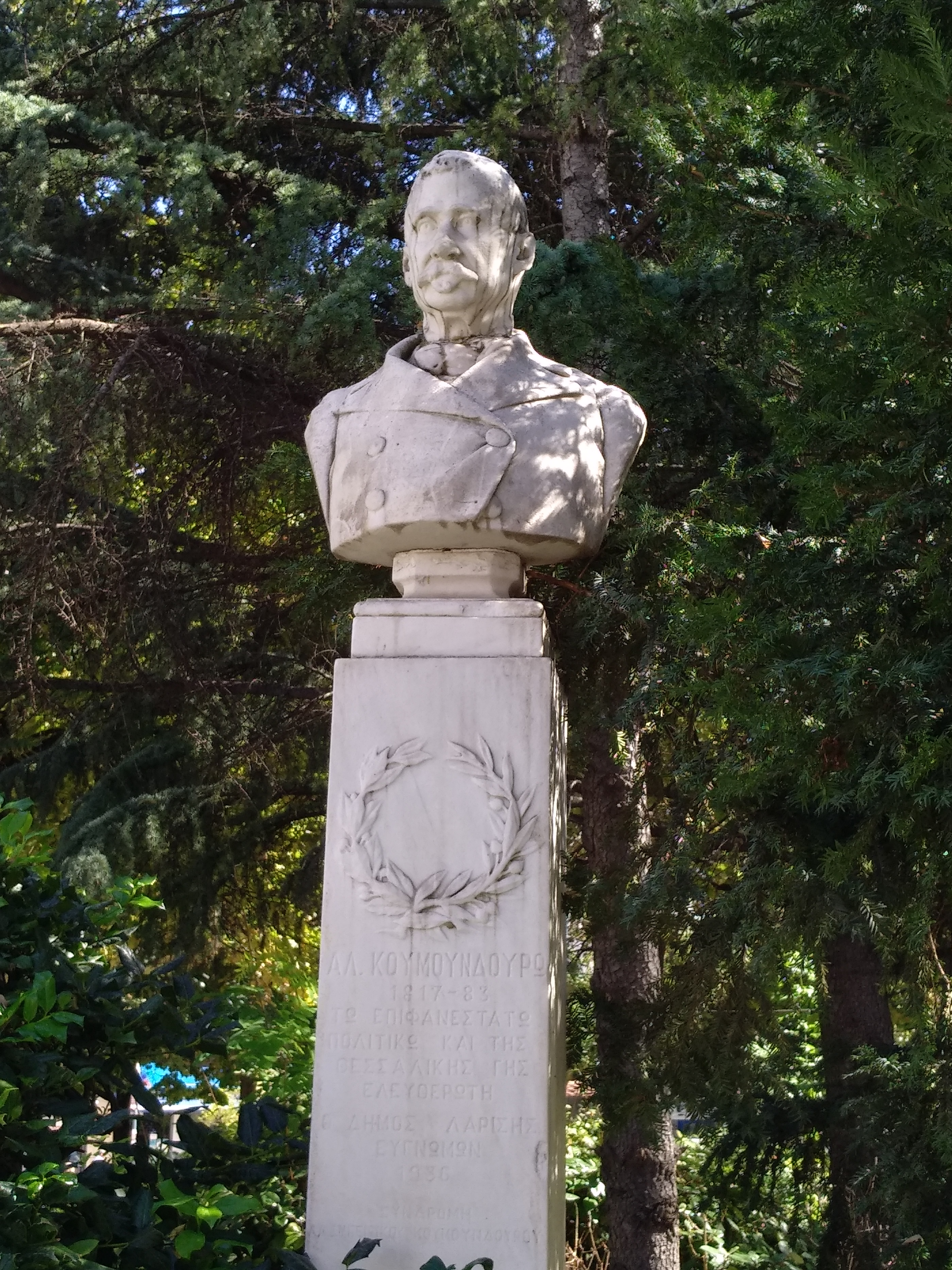
Bust of Alexandros Koumoundouros in Larissa

After the Greek War of Independence, he moved to Nafplion where he went to school, then to Athens to study law. In 1841, he took part in the revolution in Crete despite believing it was a lost cause—the conditions were not right for such an undertaking at that time.

Koumoundouros’ long career encompassed many facets of political life, including serving in parliament, authoring of legislation, promotion of a democratic regime, restoration of the army, distribution of national farms to landless farmers, and the approval of major construction work (such as the Isthmus of Corinth).

During his 50-year-long period of political involvement he tried to remain neutral, and to avoid confrontation both with the three Great Powers and with the smaller powers of that time. In this period he held various ministerial appointments eighteen times, was twice president of the Greek Parliament and ten times Prime Minister of Greece. Despite often experiencing inimical conditions, including at least three assassination attempts, he still managed to create a firm foundation for democracy in Greece. He served as prime minister of Greece a record ten times.

=== Early political career ===
He was appointed as Public Prosecutor in the Tribunal of Kalamata, but he soon quit this position in order to become a politician. His first political distinction emerged in 1853 when he was elected deputy of the province of Messinia (the province of Kalamàta). Two years later he became Speaker of the Hellenic Parliament, and the following year Minister of Economics.

He kept the same ministry in the new governments both of 1857 and 1859. After the overthrow of King Otto in 1862 he became Minister of Justice of the temporary government.

The first elections for a proper government after the fall of King Otto took place in 1863 and Koumoundouros remained as Minister of Justice, however, the extremely poor political stability lead to new elections the following year.

In the succeeding government of 1864, Koumoundouros was moved to the Ministry of Religion and Education and later to the Ministry of Internal Affairs.

=== Tenure as Prime Minister ===
On 25 March 1865, he became Prime Minister of Greece for the first time and won the elections of 1866, too. Four years later, he retained the position of the minister of army and internal affairs, in addition to being prime minister. In 1875, Koumoundouros was successful in uniting all other parliamentary parties against Charilaos Trikoupis. In August 1875, he became President of the Parliament once again and in the elections of the same year he was made prime minister of the country once more.

Elections took place three times in 1876 and Koumoundouros was victorious in two of them. He also won the elections of 1878.

Koumoundouros’ greatest achievement came in 1881, during his last (tenth) premiership, when after the Congress of Berlin and after diplomatic contacts with the Ottomans, he managed to bring about the annexation of the areas of Thessaly and Arta to the Greek mainland (with the Convention of Constantinople).

Right after this achievement he called for new elections so that representatives of the newly annexed regions could enter Parliament. Despite this concession, the new candidates elected the representative of the opposition party as President of Parliament. As a result, Koumoundouros resigned on 3 March 1882. He died some months later on 26 February 1883, in his home on Ludwig Square (now known as Koumoundourou Square), in Athens, and was buried at public expense in the First Cemetery of Athens.

== Personal life ==
After the end of the unsuccessful Cretan revolution, he married Ekaterìni Konstantinou G. Mavromichàli of the famed Maniot family. They had two children. His first son Konstantìnos, was born in Kalamata 1846, and daughter Marìa, was born in Kalamata 1845. Ekaterìni died young and Koumoundouros married Efthimìa Perotì who presented him with his second son in 1858, Spirìdonas and in 1867 a daughter, Olga.

== See also ==
- Greek War of Independence
- Charilaos Trikoupis

== Notes ==
Other spellings of his name are: Kumunduros and Komunduros. Consult Bikélas, Coumoundouros, (Montpelier, 1884).

Political offices
Preceded by Konstantinos Kanaris	Prime Minister of Greece; 2 March – 20 October 1865	Succeeded by Epameinondas Deligeorgis
Preceded by Dimitrios Voulgaris	Prime Minister of Greece; 6 – 13 November 1865	Succeeded by Epameinondas Deligeorgis
Preceded by Dimitrios Voulgaris	Prime Minister of Greece; 18 December 1866 – 20 December 1867	Succeeded by Aristeidis Moraitinis
Preceded by Epameinondas Deligeorgis	Prime Minister of Greece; 3 December 1870 – 28 October 1871	Succeeded by Thrasivoulos Zaimis
Preceded by Charilaos Trikoupis	Prime Minister of Greece; 15 October 1875 – 26 November 1876	Succeeded by Epameinondas Deligeorgis
Preceded by Epameinondas Deligeorgis	Prime Minister of Greece; 1 December 1876 - 26 February 1877	Succeeded by Epameinondas Deligeorgis
Preceded by Epameinondas Deligeorgis	Prime Minister of Greece; 19 - 26 May 1877	Succeeded by Konstantinos Kanaris
Preceded by Konstantinos Kanaris	Prime Minister of Greece; 11 January - 21 October 1878	Succeeded by Charilaos Trikoupis
Preceded by Charilaos Trikoupis	Prime Minister of Greece; 26 October 1878 - 10 March 1880	Succeeded by Charilaos Trikoupis
Preceded by Charilaos Trikoupis	Prime Minister of Greece; 13 October 1880 - 3 March 1882	Succeeded by Charilaos Trikoupis
