= Bavarian Auxiliary Corps =

Royal Bavarian Auxiliary Corps
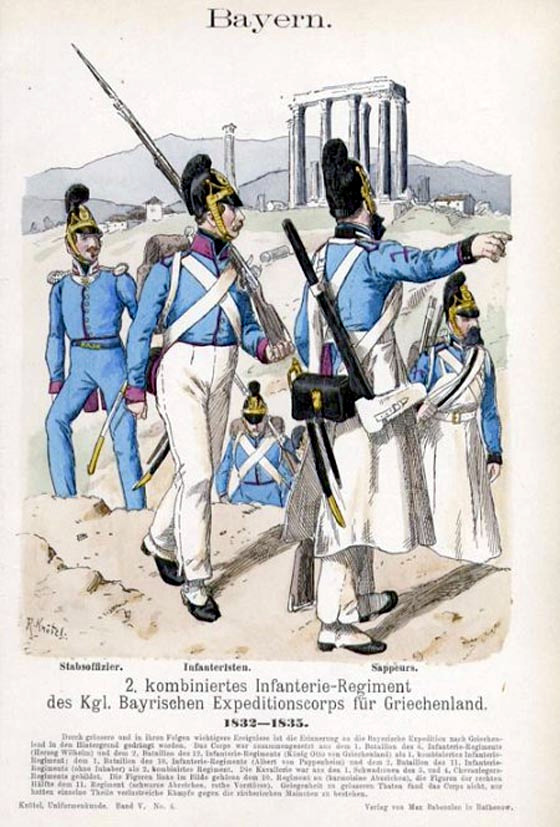
- Soldiers of the 2nd Combined Infantry Regiment by Richard Knötel
- Active: 1832–1837
- Country: Kingdom of Bavaria (1832–1834); Kingdom of Greece (1834–1837)
- Branch: Bavarian Army; Hellenic Army
- Type: Line infantry Artillery; Cavalry
- Size: 3,582 men (1833); 4,570 men (1835)
- Engagements: Maniot Uprising of 1834

Commanders
- Commander: Friedrich von Hertling

The Royal Bavarian Auxiliary Corps (Greek: Βασιλικὸν Βαυαρικὸν Ἐπικουρικὸν Σῶμα, German: Königlich Bayerisches Hilfskorps) was a military force formed in 1832 to accompany the Bavarian prince Otto to the newly independent Kingdom of Greece, after he was chosen as the country's first king. As part of the treaty provisions of Otto's accession, a Bavarian-staffed volunteer military corps was to be formed to replace the forces maintained there by the Great Powers—chiefly the French troops of the Morea Expedition—as well as the remnants of the Greek forces organized during the Greek War of Independence, and provide cadres and training for the new Hellenic Army.

Because not enough volunteers could be found in time, regular Bavarian Army troops formed much of the actual corps that arrived with Otto in Greece in early 1833. The Bavarian Army regulars were gradually replaced by volunteers until 1834. These came chiefly from Bavaria, but also included men from diverse nations, and often of non-military background. Most of the Bavarians left by 1837, but many remained behind, dominating the Greek army and the administration. This "Bavarocracy" (Βαυαροκρατία), coupled with the huge expenses involved in maintaining the Bavarians, provoked great resentment among the Greeks, and was one of the chief causes of the 3 September 1843 Revolution.

== Background ==
Article 14 of the 1832 Treaty of London, where Britain, France, and Russia, agreed on the establishment of the Kingdom of Greece, under the Bavarian prince Otto, stipulated that Otto's father, King Ludwig I of Bavaria, would recruit a force of up to 3,500 soldiers, at the expense of the Greek treasury, to replace the allied troops (i.e., the French expeditionary corps). The latter would remain under the disposition of the King of Greece until the arrival of the Bavarian troops. In Article 15, the King of Bavaria promised to supply Bavarian officers for the establishment of a national army in Greece.

The Philhellene professor Friedrich Thiersch and Colonel Carl Wilhelm von Heideck, who had served in Greece under Governor Ioannis Kapodistrias and was now a member of Otto's regency council, reported on the situation in Greece to King Ludwig. Following the assassination of Kapodistrias in 1831, Greece was in near-constant civil war. The regular and irregular military forces organized by Kapodistrias were practically dissolved, but many thousands of their members retained their weapons and lived off the countryside. The Bavarians distrusted the irregular fighters who had fought the civil war, and wanted to avoid being drawn into the local factional struggles. Therefore, it was decided early on that Otto's new regime could rely solely on the Bavarian troops, who would enforce the new government's policies. To that end, all Greek military formations, chiefly composed of irregulars, would be disbanded, and Greeks were to be excluded from all senior positions in the administration and the military.

== Formation and arrival in Greece ==
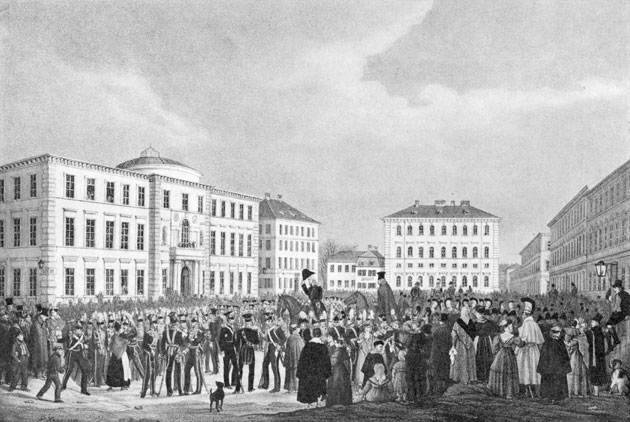
Bavarian Auxiliary Corps on parade in Munich.

The expeditionary corps was formed following a convention concluded on 1 November 1832 between Karl von Abel, one of the three members of the projected regency for the underage Otto, on behalf of Greece and Philippe de Flad on behalf of the Kingdom of Bavaria.

The convention's 27 articles stipulated that the expeditionary corps of 3,500 men would be composed of staff, four infantry battalions, six cavalry companies, four artillery companies, and a technician company. The corps was to be composed of volunteers, but until these could be recruited, regular Bavarian Army troops would be provided; half of the corps were to stay in Greece for two years, and the rest for four; the mission of the Auxiliary Corps was slated to end on 1 January 1837. The costs for the maintenance of the corps were set at 50,000 florins annually, to be covered by the Greek government. Officers and adjutants were to receive pay equivalent to one rank above their own.

According to the Greek military historian Andreas Kastanis, the treaty contained "basic omissions" in terms of the corps' recruitment: First, the complete lack of a provision for engineering troops, which were an absolute necessity in war-ravaged and under-developed Greece. Indeed, for most of the 19th century the main occupation of Greek military engineers was building basic infrastructure across the country. Second, no formal requirements were placed for the Bavarian volunteers, and third, no requirements were placed for the Bavarian officers sent to oversee the training and organization of the nascent Hellenic Army.

Preparations for Otto's departure were confused, and little headway was made in the recruitment of the Auxiliary Corps before Otto was due to set out for Greece. As a result, King Ludwig was obliged to initially fill its ranks with troops seconded from the Bavarian Army: of the 3,582 men sent to Greece, about half were Bavarian Army regulars and the rest volunteers. The Bavarian Army units formed two combined regiments (one from 1st Battalion/6th Regiment and 2nd Battalion/12th Regiment, and the other from 1st Battalion/10th Regiment and 2nd Battalion/11th Regiment), two light cavalry squadrons and eight field guns, under Brigade General Friedrich von Hertling. The Auxiliary Corps set out for embarkation at Trieste, while Otto left Munich on 6 December 1832 for Brindisi. On board the British frigate Madagascar, Otto joined the troop convoy at Corfu, but it took further two weeks of sailing through heavy weather before the fleet of 43 ships arrived at the Greek capital of Nafplion on 30 January 1833.

== Service in Greece ==
=== Arrival of the corps and the Bavarocracy ===
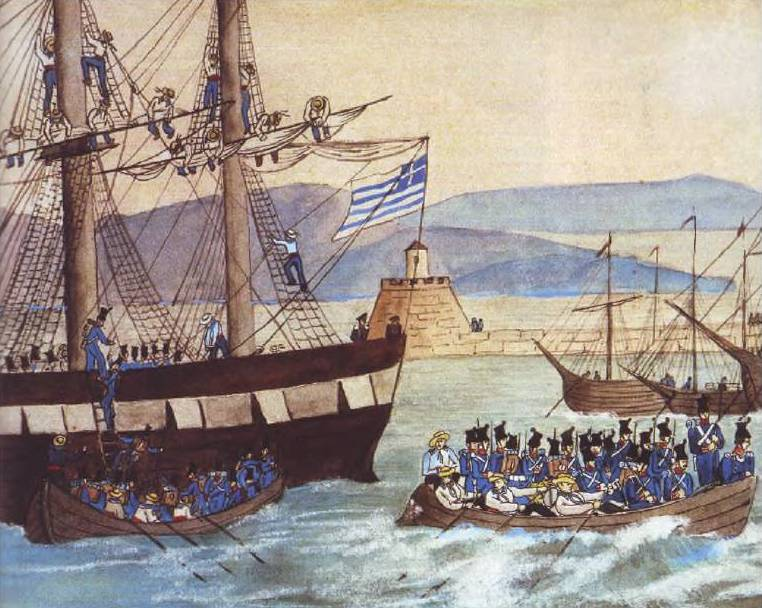
The arrival of the Bavarian army in Greece, water colour by the Bavarian lieutenant Ludwig Köllnberger

The regency council that led the government during Otto's minority quickly became extremely unpopular. Following King Ludwig's instructions, they disregarded Greek demands for a constitution and ruled the country autocratically. Furthermore, in their efforts to quickly transform Greece into a European-style state, the regency did not examine the conditions objectively, but tried to directly import European norms and regulations, which were often inappropriate for the war-ravaged and destitute country, and completely failed to take into account the sensibilities of the local population. The regency was particularly suspicious of the irregular soldiers who had fought the War of Independence, and failed to either recompense them with the public lands captured from the Turks, as promised, nor to provide them with employ by taking them into the army. This led to them turning to brigandage, both in Greece and across the border into the Ottoman territories.

Per the terms of the Greco-Bavarian treaty, the Auxiliary Corps was to be an independent formation, not to be mixed or combined with native Greek units, and subject to Bavarian military law, rather than the French regulations followed in Greece. However, in its efforts to reduce the country to obedience and establish order, as well as to minimize the influence of the Greek factions and Westernize the country as fast as possible, the regency could only rely on foreign, chiefly Bavarian officials, and on the bayonets of the Bavarian troops. As a result, the separation of the Bavarian and Greek troops was disregarded, and on 6 February 1834, by Royal Decree, the relevant article in the treaty was modified unilaterally, with the Auxiliary Corps becoming a part of the Hellenic Army. Two companies in each infantry battalion, as well as in the single cavalry regiment and artillery battalion, were to be manned exclusively by Bavarians. While the stated purpose of this arrangement was to promote the training of the Greek units, in reality this was a measure designed to ensure absolute control of the army by the Bavarians.

Likewise, all senior military positions were given to Bavarians or other foreigners: Wilhelm von Le Suire became Minister for Military Affairs; Christian Schmaltz Inspector-General of the Army; Anton Zäch head of the Engineers; Ludwig von Lüder head of the Artillery; the French Philhellene François Graillard head of the Gendarmerie; and the British Philhellene Thomas Gordon chief of the General Staff. The Bavarians, moreover, remained subject to their own military regulations, received higher salaries, and swifter promotions, setting themselves further apart from their Greek colleagues. In contrast, similar measures to concentrate command authority in the hands of foreigners were not undertaken in the navy, which on its own could not challenge the regime.

This "Bavarocracy" (Βαυαροκρατία), both in the army and the civil administration, quickly became a source of resentment among the Greeks, and was a major rallying cry of political opposition to the regency, and later to Otto himself. The exorbitant costs of the Auxiliary Corps became a particular point of contention, particularly since, by 1834, its strength reached 5,000 men, well above the provisions of the treaty.

=== Life of the Bavarian troops in Greece ===
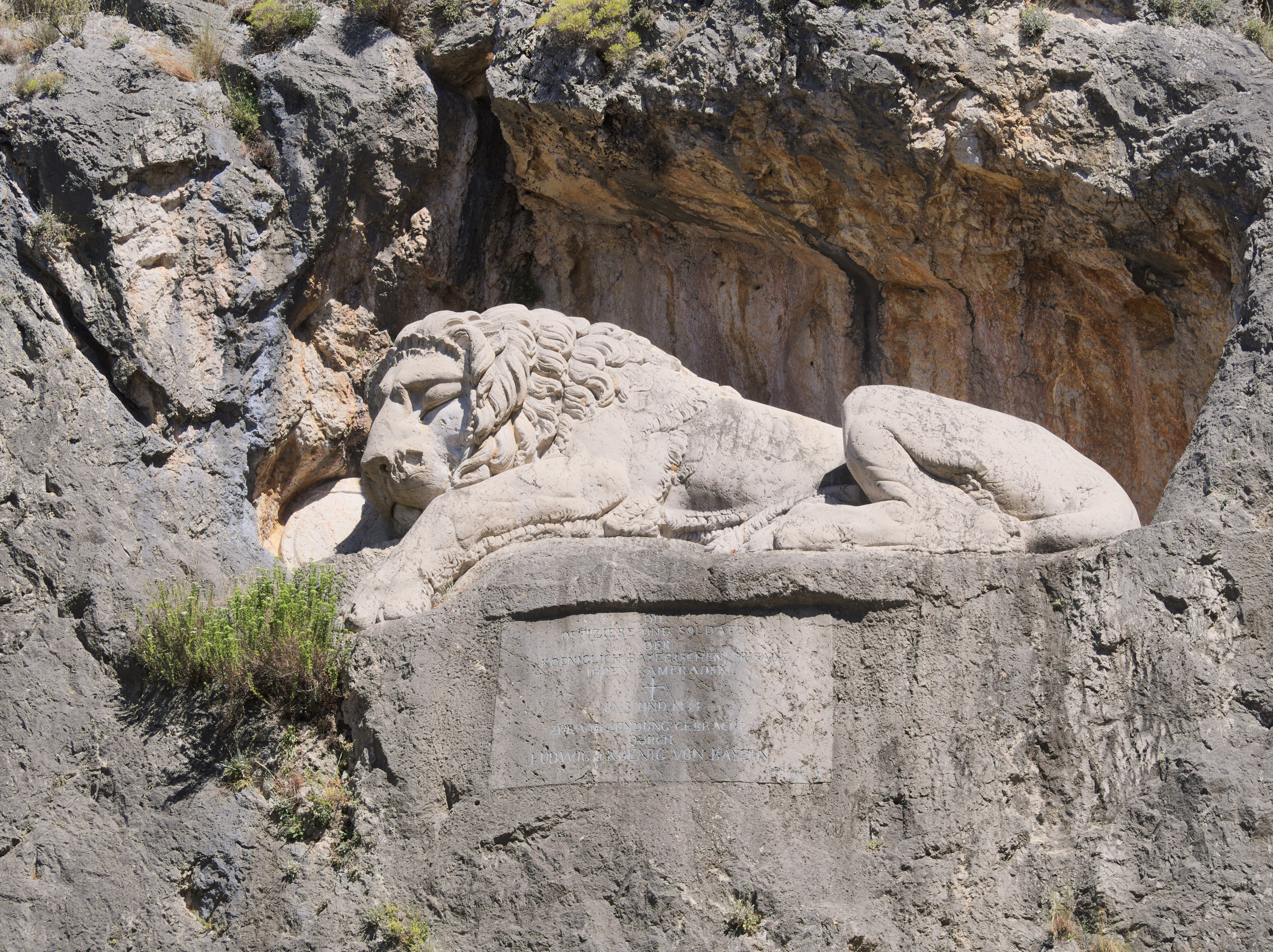
The "Lion of the Bavarians" at Nafplion, a memorial to the Bavarian Army members who died from typhus in 1833–1834

Most of the Bavarian Army regulars left Greece after a year, and were replaced by volunteers. Between 1832 and 1835, 5,410 volunteers were recruited for the Corps. 3,345 were Bavarians, 1,440 from minor German states, 235 Swiss, 186 Prussians, 135 Austrians, 23 French, 19 Danes, 10 Russians, 6 Italians, 3 Swedes, 2 British, 1 each from Holland, Spain, and Belgium, and even 3 Turks.

Many of these volunteers were disappointed by the realities they found in Greece, which matched neither the romantic expectations current in Europe nor the often excessive promises made by recruiting agents. Service in Greece was unpopular, and considered almost a death sentence: half of the volunteers died in Greece from disease. Bavarian Army personnel, especially officers, sometimes had to be effectively cajoled by their superiors into signing up.

Life in Greece also proved to be too expensive for the Bavarians, who were accustomed to comforts alien to the Greeks and unobtainable in Greece except at great cost. Furthermore, the divides of religion and language also meant that few of them were able to find Greek wives. In the Athenian suburb of Iraklio, founded as a Bavarian military colony, the local Catholic pastor had to function as match-maker, bringing in a boatload of Catholic girls from Syros to secure the colony's continued existence.

=== Maniot uprising of 1834 ===
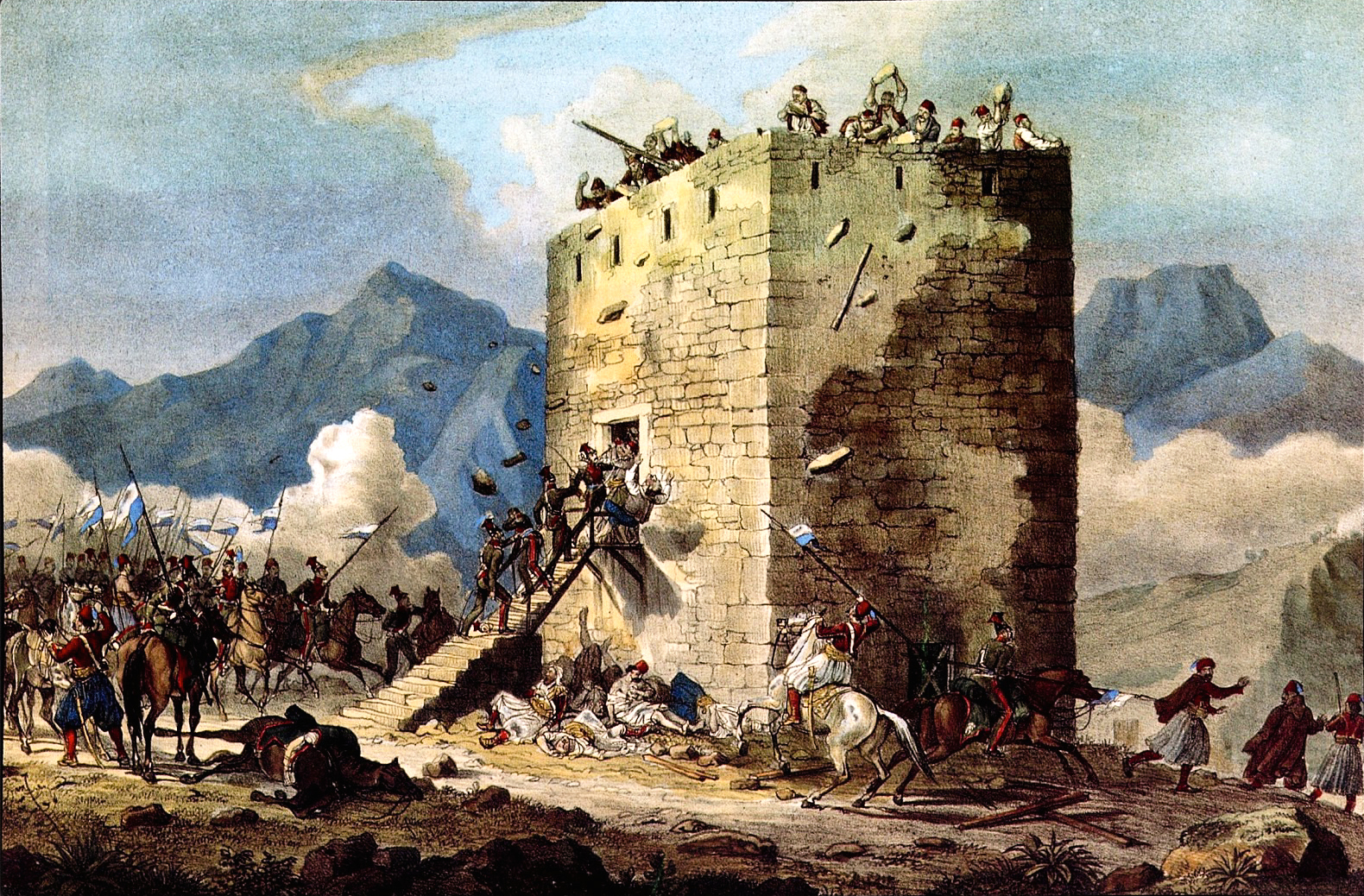
Bavarian troops attacking a Maniot tower house, watercolor by Köllnberger

The Corps fought its main test of arms in 1834, being sent to confront an uprising of the Mani Peninsula. The Maniots, a warlike people who had withstood the Ottomans and Egyptians, were incensed when the regency ordered the destruction of the fortified tower houses typical of the area. This was a typical example of Bavarian insensitivity to local peculiarities: where the regency saw in these buildings only a dangerous military asset that might be used to challenge its authority, to the Maniots these were their homes, whose destruction without recompense would leave them destitute. The regency's local agent, the Bavarian officer Maximilian Feder, had managed to maintain order until then through a judicious mixture of bribery and force, but he lost control following the regency's arrest and trial of Theodoros Kolokotronis, one of the principal military leaders of the War of Independence. Kolokotronis' supporters in the region and the regency's political rivals combined in exhorting the Maniots to rise up.

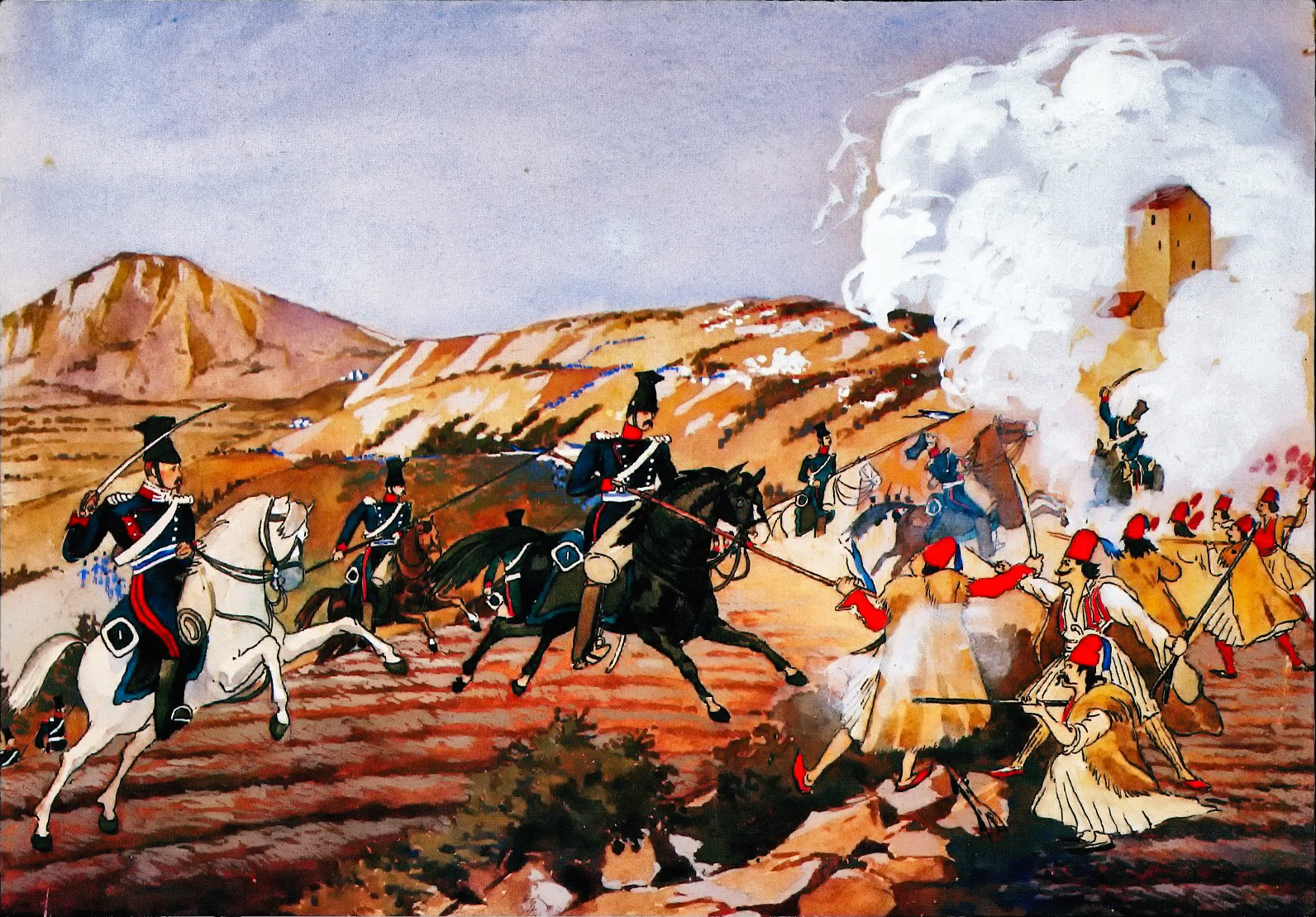
Bavarian lancers charging Greek rebels, watercolor by Köllnberger

2,500 men of the Corps, under Christian Schmaltz, were sent to suppress the revolt. The Bavarians' unfamiliarity with the climate and terrain, to which the Maniots and their tactics were perfectly adjusted, meant that they could achieve little: in the harsh mountains, the Bavarians were unable to deploy larger formations or even provide effective artillery support, while the Maniots resorted to their time-honoured guerrilla tactics against their lumbering, heat-exhausted opponents. The Bavarians were also completely unprepared for the cruelty of the Maniots: captured soldiers were sometimes put in bags with wild cats, or gradually mutilated. At best, they were stripped of weapons and clothes and sent back naked to their lines. To denote their disdain, when the Maniots agreed to ransom their prisoners to the government, they demanded six phoenixes for each soldier, but only one phoenix for the officers.

Unable to make headway, the regency was forced to issue a general amnesty to calm the situation, and negotiate terms: the Maniots were promised subsidies, respect for the privileges of Orthodox monasteries, and non-interference in their affairs. The upshot of the affair was that the government ended up pouring into Mani twice the sums that it received from it in taxes, and that the myth of the Bavarians' invincibility was broken, severely tarnishing the regency's prestige and authority and encouraging future revolts.

=== Later years and disbandment ===
By December 1834, of the 5,678 men in the Hellenic Army, 3,278 were members of the Bavarian Auxiliary Corps; a year later, with army strength at 9,613, the Auxiliary Corps men numbered 4,570. This was an enormous burden on the weak Greek finances, especially since this army counted no fewer than 731 officers (533 Greeks, 144 Germans, 54 Philhellenes). In the assessment of the Austrian ambassador, Anton von Prokesch-Osten, "the foreign auxiliary troops cost money, without doing much", while the "insistence on European clothing and armament in the army have removed the most usable people from military service and made them into disgruntled men".

In January 1836, the army was reorganized, as the decision was taken to gradually form units only from Greeks. Two of the four infantry battalions were now composed of Greeks, and the other two of men of the Auxiliary Corps, with the intention to replace them with Greeks as the Germans' terms of service ended. Furthermore, two Labourer Companies (Λόχοι Εργατών) were formed from supernumerary German personnel, and employed in road construction in Continental Greece and as border guards.

=== Dénouement: the last Bavarian officers ===
When the Corps' tenure ended in 1837, the bulk of its members left, but the Greek government offered inducements for many to stay on. In 1841, when Otto was finally forced to call upon a Greek politician, Alexandros Mavrokordatos, to become Prime Minister, the latter demanded that the Bavarians be removed from their commanding positions, and that a process of replacement of the remaining volunteers be begun. Although Otto was willing to replace Schmaltz as Minister for Military Affairs with a Greek, Andreas Metaxas, he rejected the second demand.

Tensions between the Greek and Bavarian officers increased during the period, and reached a boiling point in 1842: during the annual celebration for the start of the War of Independence on 25 March, the Greek artillery officers in Nafplion publicly demanded the removal of the remaining foreign volunteers. The Bavarian commander of the artillery imposed a 20-day prison sentence on them, which caused an uproar in the press. The government quickly quashed the sentence, but reassigned the protesting officers to other garrisons, while the commander remained in place. 181 Bavarian officers remained in the army lists until the 3 September 1843 Revolution that introduced constitutional government and ended the Bavarian domination of the army by dismissing all foreigners apart from the "old Philhellenes" who had fought in the War of Independence.

== Assessment ==
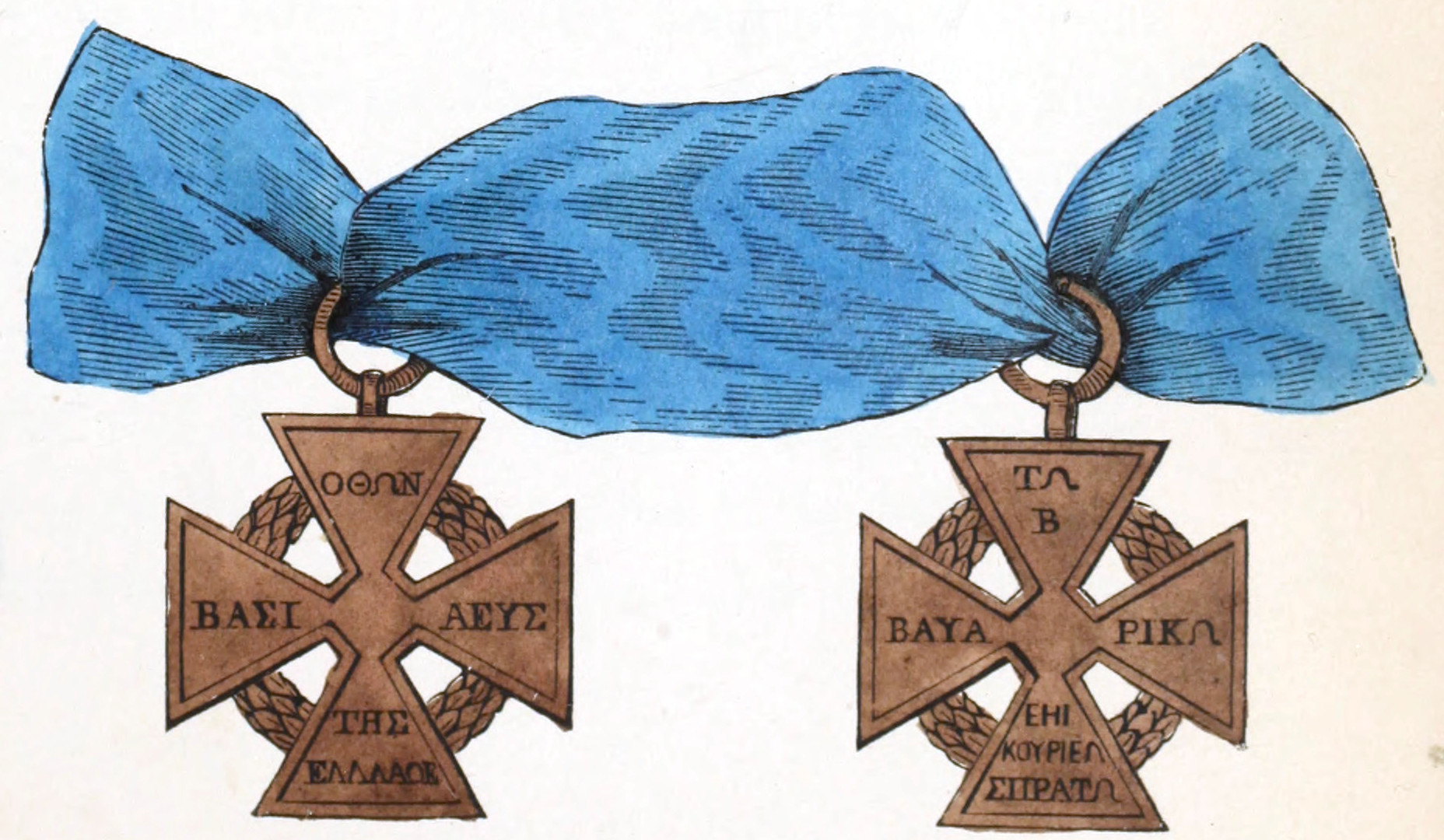
Obverse and reverse of the Cross of the Bavarian Auxiliary Corps, instituted in 1833 by the Greek government

The Bavarian Auxiliary Corps was contentious during its existence, and caused great resentment among the Greeks. Historians generally agree that its record was poor, particularly in comparison with the French who had preceded them; not only were the latter much better in training and organizing the Greek army, they also proved more capable and willing to assist the Greeks by building fortifications, bridges, and other infrastructure, without recompense. The Bavarians, on the other hand, despite their high salaries and longer stay in the country, left almost no buildings of note. A large part of the problem originated with the recruitment of the Corps. Most of the volunteers were low-ranking soldiers or even simple artisans, who in Greece found themselves promoted to officers; many of the recruits were adventurers, while others were the dregs of society in their home countries.

In the words of the official Hellenic Army history, "the Hellenic Army benefited in no way from the Bavarians who took service as trainers and organizers", as the Bavarian officers, rapidly promoted from junior positions to higher ranks, lacked the experience necessary to properly organize the new army, and were unable to take into consideration the country's peculiar circumstances, climate, or the character of its people. It is telling that almost the only drill and exercises carried out during this period were at the company level, which was what the Bavarian officers were familiar with. This lack of skills made the retention of so many Bavarian officers after 1837 even more galling to the Greeks. According to newspaper accounts from 1842, of the remaining Bavarian officers at the time, only the four technicians in the Nafplion arsenal, and a single captain of the Engineers were absolutely necessary due to their technical skills.

The costs of recruitment and maintenance of the Corps were exorbitant for the means available to Greece, especially so soon after the end of the destructive War of Independence; the Corps took a lion's share of the Greek military budget, for little in return. Of the 7,028,207 drachmas in the 1833 budget of the Ministry for Military Affairs, 1,220,582 (17.4%) were spent on recruitment in Bavaria, and 2,786,067 (39.6%) on maintenance of the Corps. In the next year, out of a budget of 8,505,208 drachmas, the respective figures were 1,371,431 (16.1%) and 1,740,282 (20.5%). It is indicative that as late as 1842, the 25 Bavarian officers serving in the artillery received a total salary of 5,470 drachmas, whereas their 27 Greek colleagues, most of whom had received better education as graduates of the Hellenic Military Academy, only 3,910 drachmas. One account places the total expenses incurred by the Greek fisc on account of the Auxiliary Corps to the "astronomic sum" (Kastanis) of 66,842,126 drachmas. So great was the financial burden, that France refused to provide guarantees for the third installment of the 60,000,000-franc loan stipulated in the Treaty of London, unless the Bavarian army left the country.

== Legacy ==
The military colony at Iraklion quickly assimilated into Greek society, and their descendants virtually forgot their German roots. During World War II, Heinrich Himmler, who learned of the German origin of many Irakliotes, came in person to the area and took measures to ensure their comfort amidst the Great Famine. About a hundred Irakliotes were even persuaded to move to Germany as Volksdeutsche and join the German war effort, but once in Bavaria they found a hostile welcome; and when they returned home in 1945, they found their properties confiscated by the Greek government.

The Greek beer brand Fix is owed to one of these Bavarian colonists, Johann Adam Fuchs, an engineer who settled in Iraklion. His son Johann Georg came to visit him from Bavaria but found that he had died just before his arrival. He then settled in Greece and opened up a brewery, which became known by the Hellenized form of his name as "Fix".

== Literature on or by members of the corps ==
- Michael Chursilchen, Geschichtliche Erinnerungen an die Expedition nach Hellas, Amberg 1835, and Die Bayerische Brigade in Griechenland, Nuremberg 1838
- J. A. S. Abele, Griechische Denkwürdigkeiten und die K. bayerische Expedition nach Hellas, Mannheim 1836
- Franz Xaver von Predl, Erinnerungen aus Griechenland in den Jahren 1833-34 & 35, Würzburg 1836
- C. J. Bronzetti, Erinnerungen an Griechenland aus den Jahren 1832-1835, Würzburg 1842
- Joseph Schuster, "Die Expedition des bayerischen Hilfskorps nach Griechenland 1832-1835 in sanitätsgeschichtlicher Hinsicht", Oberbayerisches Archiv für vaterländische Geschichte, 54(3), 1909, pp. 325–363.
- Heinz Kalheber, "Bavarian plant collectors in Greece – 1. Franz Xaver Berger, Franz Zuccarini and Carl Nikolaus Fraas", Willdenowia 36, 2006, pp. 565–578
- Εικόνες από την Ελλάδα 1833–1838. Υδατογραφίες του Hans Hanke από το έργο του Ludwig Köllnberger, Athens 1976 (reprint 2000), collection of water colours by the Bavarian lieutenant Ludwig Köllnberger (1811–1892)

== Sources ==
- Bronzetti, C. J. (1842). Erinnerungen an Griechenland aus den Jahren 1832-1835 [Memoirs on Greece From the Years 1832-1835] (in German). Würzburg: Stachel'sche Buchhandlung.
- Kastanis, Andreas (2010). "Το Βαυαρικό Επικουρικό Σώμα: Εθελοντές στρατιωτικοί στην Ελλάδα" [The Bavarian Auxiliary Corps: Volunteer Soldiers in Greece]. Η Ελλάδα την εποχή του Όθωνα [Greece in the Age of Otto] (in Greek). Athens: Periskopio Editions. ISBN 978-960-9408-59-2.
- Petropoulos, Ioannis & Koumarianou, Aikaterini (1977). "Περίοδος Βασιλείας του Όθωνος 1833-1862. Εισαγωγή & Περίοδος Απόλυτης Μοναρχίας" [Reign of Otto 1833-1862. Introduction & Absolute Monarchy Period]. In Christopoulos, Georgios A. & Bastias, Ioannis K. (eds.). Ιστορία του Ελληνικού Έθνους, Τόμος ΙΓ΄: Νεώτερος Ελληνισμός από το 1833 έως το 1881 [History of the Greek Nation, Volume XIII: Modern Hellenism from 1833 to 1881] (in Greek). Athens: Ekdotiki Athinon. pp. 8–105. ISBN 978-960-213-109-1.
- Seidl, Wolf (1981). Bayern in Griechenland. Die Geburt des griechischen Nationalstaats und die Regierung König Ottos [Bavaria in Greece. The Birth of the Greek Nation-State and the Reign of King Otto] (in German) (New and expanded ed.). Munich: Prestel. ISBN 3-7913-0556-5.
- Η ιστορία της οργάνωσης του Ελληνικού Στρατού, 1821–1954 [History of the Organization of the Hellenic Army, 1821–1954] (in Greek). Athens: Hellenic Army Historical Directorate. 2005. ISBN 960-7897-45-5.
