= Cross of the Bavarian Auxiliary Corps =

Greek military decoration

Cross for the Bavarian Auxiliary Corps
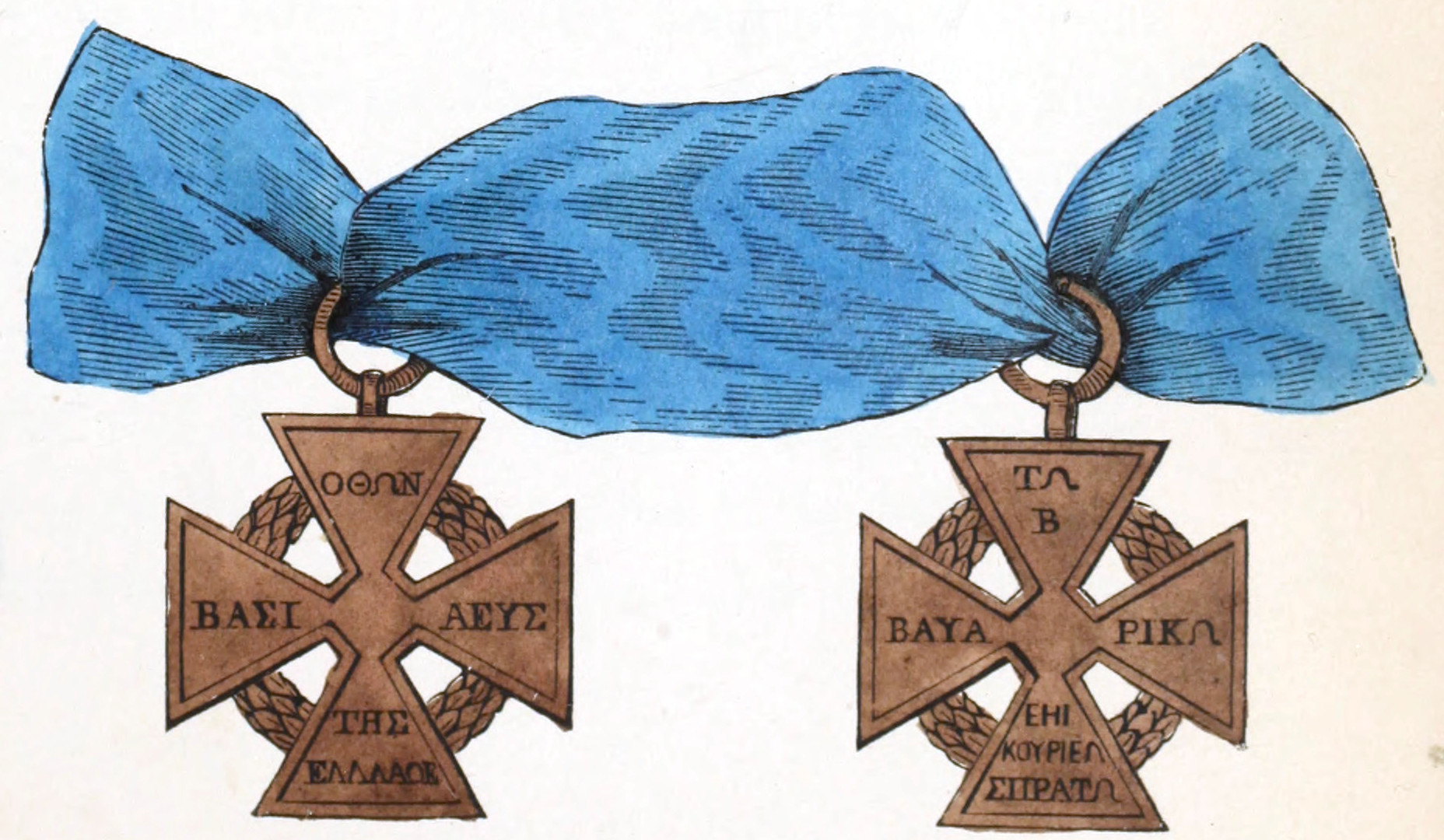
- Obverse and reverse of the cross
- Type: Military decoration
- Country: Kingdom of Greece
- Eligibility: Service in the Bavarian Auxiliary Corps
- Established: 22 November 1833

The Cross for the Bavarian Auxiliary Corps (Greek: Αριστείον του Βαυαρικού Επικουρικού Σώματος) was a military decoration of Greece for participation in the Bavarian Auxiliary Corps.

== Regulations ==
The Cross for the Bavarian Auxiliary Corps was established by resolution of the Regency Council on 22 November 1833 (Old Style). It was awarded to servicemen of the Bavarian Auxiliary Corps who accompanied Bavarian prince Otto to Greece.

== Appearance ==
It has the form of a brass cross with trapezoidal edges mounted on a laurel wreath. The obverse is inscribed with the sentence "Otto King of Greece". The reverse side of the cross bears the inscription "To the Bavarian Auxiliary Army". Both inscriptions were written in Greek. It remains unknown whether a number of surviving iron crosses were part of a separate degree. Its dimensions varied between 32–33 millimetres (1.3–1.3 in). Some of the crosses were painted black and the embossed letters were gilded. It was held by a light blue 36 millimetres (1.4 in) wide ribbon.

== Sources ==
- Beldecos, Georgios (1991). Τάγματα Αριστείας και Στρατιωτικά Μετάλλια της Ελλάδος [Hellenic Orders, Decorations and Medals] (in Greek). Athens War Museum. ISBN 960-85054-0-2.
- Dimacopoulos, George (1961). Greek Orders and Medals. Vol. I. A. Mavridis.
