= Trial of Kolokotronis =

The Trial of Kolokotronis (Greek: Δίκη Κολοκοτρώνη) was the trial for high treason of Theodoros Kolokotronis and Dimitris Plapoutas, two of the most prominent military leaders of the Greek War of Independence, by the Bavarian regency.

The causes of the trial had to do mainly with the consolidation of power in Greece as well as with the attempt to degrade the Russian Party. The trial is considered a "twisted trial", while in historiography the facts have been distorted.

== Causes ==
After the assassination of the governor Ioannis Kapodistrias, the followers of the Russian party found themselves outside the positions of power. At the same time, Greek military corps of 10,000 people were disbanded and replaced by Bavarian mercenaries. The result was that the former Greek soldiers were led to unemployment with their consequent intense dissatisfaction, moreover some of them became robbers. Additionally, the Regents government had no members from the Russian party.

More broadly, however, the dispute between the military and politicians over the province of power existed since the years of the Revolution and continued in the current political situation of Greece. Furthermore, in March 1833 the Viceroyalty prepared the ground for the autocephaly of the Greek Church by the Patriarchate, which was treated as an offensive move for the religious tradition, while some monasteries were also closed. Finally, the relatively non-conservative morality of Bavarian families was treated with caution, contributing to their alienation from the Greek people.

The Bavarians viewed Kolokotronis and the followers of the Russian party with suspicion from the beginning, especially after learning of the deadly conflict in Argos between the French army and Kolokotronis' Military Committee.

According to Roderick Beaton, Kolokotronis had indeed incited the robbery in the countryside as well as conspired against the Bavarians. For these reasons he constituted a threat to the regime. According to the History of the Hellenic Nation, "for at least some of these charges Kolokotronis and Plapoutas were not completely uninvolved, such as inciting a standoff or resorting to Foreign Powers"

== Reasons and events ==
=== The "main conspiracy" ===
Before Otto's arrival, Kolokotronis had sent a letter to the Russian foreign minister Karl Nesselrod indirectly asking for his intervention.

=== The "little conspiracy" ===
In addition, a German scholar, John Franz, a friend of Josef Ludwig von Armansperg but also a close associate of the Russian party, wrote a letter to Otto's father against the two other regents to dismiss them from their positions. Kolokotronis participated in many meetings in Tripoli together with other members of the pro-Russian party, but he refused to sign the above letter of France which other members did such as his son C=Kollinos.

=== Additional facts ===
A fortuitous event created further suspicion when the bandit Kontavounisios killed soldiers and stole their horses. He gave one of the loot to his friend Plaputas. Plaputas then returned the horse to the army, but this created negative impressions while Plaputas was accused of having ordered the attack. In addition he had said a few phrases against the Regency. Similar statements had also been made by his son Kolokotronis. A former soldier, Th. Alexandropoulos, constantly informed the Viceroyalty that Kolokotronis was meeting in Tripoli with a lot of people and was preparing a revolution.

The meetings in Tripoli were abandoned by their protagonists such as Dionysios Romas because they were afraid that they would be accused of participating in a conspiracy. Romas finally escaped to Zakynthos without being tried even though he was their first. Ioannis France had a similar fate where he was arrested to prevent his personal friend von Armansperg from being exposed and deported from the country.

At the beginning of September 1833, it was learned in the capital that the island of Tinos had revolted. However, the facts had been distorted as the Tinians had asked for tax reliefs and after consultations with the authorities they had stopped any of their actions. However, the event recalled the corresponding anti-Capodostrian rebellion on the island of Hydra and created disproportionate fear in the authorities.

== The persons ==
=== In court ===
==== Anastasios Polyzoidis ====
President of the Court of Nafplio. Fierce opponent of Kapodistrias who hailed his assassination as "tyrannicide". He was a close associate of Alexandros Mavrokordatos. In 1831 he was the publisher of the opposition newspaper Apollon.

==== Edward Mason ====
Prosecutor in the trial with parallel duties of investigator. He had been the lawyer of Georgios Mavromichalis for the assassination of the governor Kapodistrias. Fanatical opponent of the Russian party. Kanellos Deligiannis, a personal enemy of Plaputos, was appointed as his assistant. They were both followers of the French party.

==== Christodoulos Klonaris ====
He was the defense attorney of Plapoutas. He also indirectly defended Kolokotronis. Enemy of Kapodistrias and was a close associate of Alexandros Mavrokordatos.

== Political contributors ==
=== Josef Ludwig von Armansperg ===
He came into consultation with the ambassadors of all three Great Powers who were reacting to the executions of the accused. He convinced Carl Wilhelm von Heideck and Karl von Abel to have their executions postponed. The Greek people recognized him as "magnanimous" for his action in the Kolotronis trial.

=== Georgios Psillas ===
Minister of the Interior in the government. He was threatened with arrest by Georg Ludwig von Maurer when he retaliated against not informing the ministers of the arrests of Kolokotronis and Plapoutas. He was then expelled from the government.

=== Konstantinos Schinas ===
Minister of Justice. He was hated by the followers of the Russian party, because of his stance on the ecclesiastical issue (closing monasteries, etc.).

=== Ioannis Kolettis ===
Leader of the French party and minister of the interior. Political opponent of Kolokotronis. He tried to have the death sentences applied to the accused.

== The trial ==
During the trial, the witnesses who testified were either personal enemies of the defendants, or without prestige and wealth, so their opinion was not weighted. The prosecutors failed to bring evidence, due to the reluctance of witnesses to testify against Kolokotronis.

The prosecutors presented only "random testimonies without probative value" without any appeal to the public opinion that considered Kolokotronis and Plapoutas as heroes. Ultimately, the court sentenced the accused to death. The decision was not signed by the two judges Polyzoidis and Tertsetis. By order of the district attorney, they were physically forced to sign.

=== After the trial ===
The two judges subsequently lost their jobs and were prosecuted. With these actions, the Bavarian government, in essence and in the eyes of the world, violated the laws it had established for the life of judges as well as for the freedom of the press.

== The agreement to suspend executions ==
Otto of Greece requested a stay of executions from the regents Georg Ludwig von Maurer and Carl Wilhelm von Heideck as a personal favor. In return, the two regents demanded the resignation of Mavrokordatos from the prime ministership as well as the prosecution of the two judges. Josef Ludwig von Armansperg accepted the terms, resulting in the sentence being commuted to twenty years in prison.

== Concequenses ==
A direct consequence of the stance against the execution of the accused was the resignation of Alexandros Mavrokordatos from the prime ministership and his honorary mission as ambassador to Munich. In addition, the two judges were dismissed from their jobs and prosecuted, where they were acquitted. A consequence of the trial was that the authority of the government was irreparably exposed.

In addition, the patriotism and xenophobia of the Greek society was favored. A consequence of the trial was the rebellion in Mani in August 1834 by mainly followers and associates of Kolokotronis, with the support of some members of the English party.

== Public memory & art ==
Aristeidis Hatzis characterizes as at least childish and Manichean the interpretative schemes for the trial of Kolokotronis while he blames the distortion of the facts on the writings of Takis Kandiloros and Dimitrios Fotiadis as well as on the film The Trial of the Judges in 1974.
