= The Entry of King Otto of Greece into Athens =

Painting by Peter von Hess

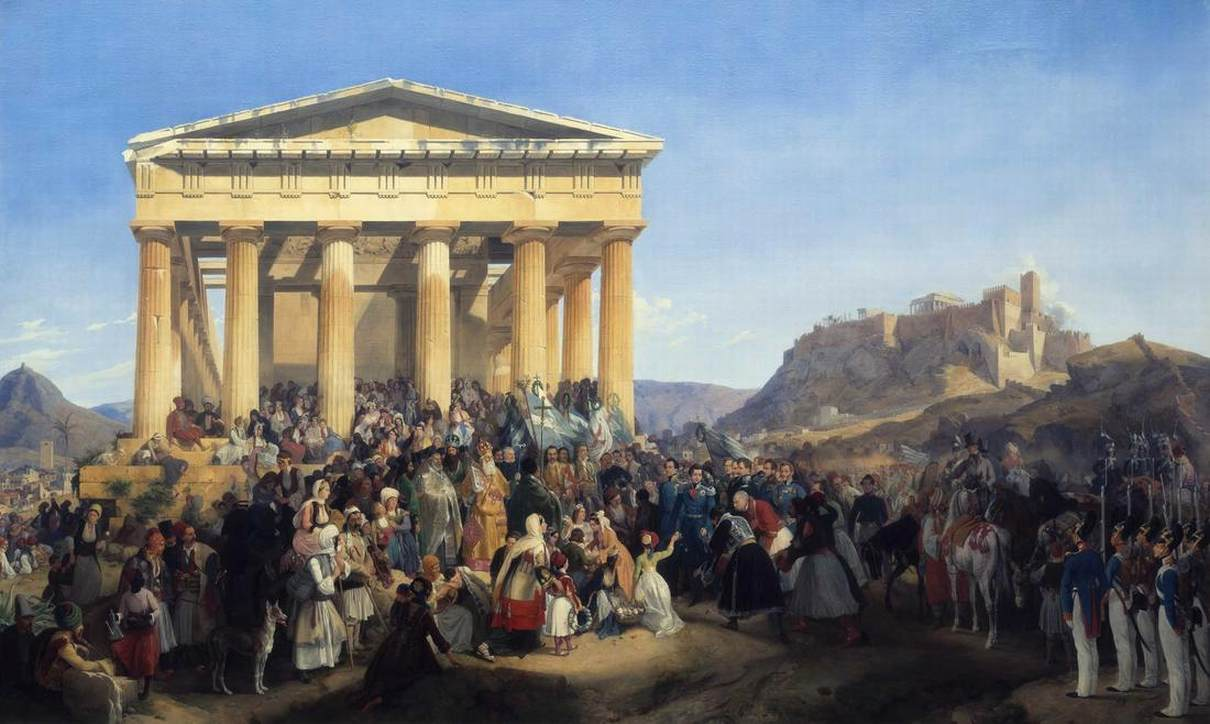
- Artist: Peter von Hess
- Year: 1839
- Type: Oil on canvas, history painting
- Dimensions: 250 cm × 415 cm (98 in × 163 in)
- Location: Neue Pinakothek, Munich

The Entry of King Otto of Greece into Athens (German: Empfang König Ottos von Griechenland in Athen) is an oil on canvas history painting by the German artist Peter von Hess, from 1839. The painting is now in the collection of the Neue Pinakothek, in Munich.

== History and description ==
It depicts the King of Greece arriving in Athens in 1833 with his entourage to be greeted by the Regency Council, clergy and politicians. Otto of Greece was the son of Ludwig I of Bavaria, who was offered the throne following Greece's successful War of Independence. The scene takes place in front of the Temple of Hephaestus, part of the Ancient Agora of Athens. In the background is the Acropolis citadel. The work was commissioned by Otto

The artist had previously produced The Entry of King Otto of Greece into Nauplia, an 1835 painting depicting Otto's arrival in Nafplio, the provisional capital of the kingdom.

== Bibliography ==
- Beaton, Roderick. Greece: Biography of a Modern Nation. University of Chicago Press, 2021.
- Lyons, Claire L. Antiquity & Photography: Early Views of Ancient Mediterranean Sites. Getty Publications, 2005.
- Stoneman, Richard. A Luminous Land: Artists Discover Greece. Getty Publications, 1998.
