= Early Greek parties =

Political parties

Early Greek parties were not features of the provisional and regional governments that were set up between 1821 and 1832. Nascent political parties were organized around a variety of interests and backgrounds, but regardless of these various factors, the political formations were named after one of the three Great Powers (Britain, France and Russia) that established the Kingdom of Greece in 1832.

== History ==
The political history of modern Greece begins with the start of the Greek War of Independence in 1821. Although political parties were not fully developed until the establishment of the Kingdom of Greece and the arrival of King Otto, many of the organizing interests and factions had already begun to gel by the time Ioannis Kapodistrias was elected as "Governor" in 1827. Greeks in that period were divided in a number of different ways:

- Regional identity, especially whether the person or family was from territory that was free of Ottoman control (the Peloponnese, Central Greece, Euboea, Attica, and the islands of the Saronic Gulf), sometimes called autochthones, or were from areas still under Turkish suzerainty, such as Constantinople, Epirus, Thessaly, Macedonia, Crete, the Dodecanese, Asia Minor, Pontus, and Cyprus, or under British control in the Ionian Islands, who were called heterochthones.
- Social status, including whether the person was a landowner like the Mavromichalis clan of Mani or naval captains like the Miaoulis family of Hydra, were an armed force like the Kolokotronis family of Arcadia or were wealthy Phanariotes from Constantinople was another factor in political groupings.
- Education: Greeks educated in one of the Great Powers—Britain, France or Russia—would often identify with the country of their education.
- Family relations: either marriage or longstanding enmity would drive individuals into political alliances.

== Parties ==
- The Russian Party (also called the "Napaioi", Ναπαίοι) was a pro-Orthodox and socially conservative party. Some of the Greek leaders of that era who were affiliated with the Russian party include: Konstantinos Kanaris, Theodoros Kolokotronis, Kitsos Tzavelas, Andreas Metaxas;
- The French Party was a more liberal grouping which was born out of the struggle in 1828-31 over the adoption of a constitution and which was most closely identified with Ioannis Kolettis, but also counted Ioannis Makriyannis, Dimitrios Voulgaris, Nikolaos Kriezotis among its most well-known members;
- The English Party was also socially liberal, supportive of a constitution and allied with the British legate Lord Lyons. Its most well-known exponents were Alexander Mavrokordatos, Kostas Botsaris, Andreas Miaoulis, Spyridon Trikoupis, Andreas Zaimis.

Eventually, these parties lost salience after the deposition of King Otto, when his successor, King George I was able to minimize the interference of the three Great Powers in internal Greek politics after 1864.

== Notes and references ==
1. Clogg, Richard; A Short History of Modern Greece; Cambridge University Press, 1979; ISBN 0-521-32837-3
2. John A. Petropulos; Politics and Statecraft in the Kingdom of Greece; Princeton University Press, 1968
