= Politics and Statecraft in the Kingdom of Greece, 1833–1843 =

- Title page for Politics and Statecraft in the Kingdom of Greece, 1833–1843 (1968)
- Author: John A. Petropulos
- Language: English
- Subject: History
- Published: 1968
- Publication place: USA
- Media type: Print
- Pages: 666
- ISBN: 9780691649276

Politics and Statecraft in the Kingdom of Greece, 1833–1843 is a book by John A. Petropulos. It was based on the author's PhD at Harvard.

== Contents ==
The work is in three parts and nine chapters.

- Chapter 1: The Setting: Bases for Political Divisions (pp. 19–52)
- Chapter 2: The Revolutionary Period, 1821–27: The Origins of the Parties (pp. 53–106)
- Chapter 3: The Kapodistrian Period (1828–31) and Interregnum (1831–32): The Crystallization of the Three Parties (pp. 107–150)
- Chapter 4: The First Regency, February 1833 – July 1834 (pp. 153–217)
- Chapter 5: The Armansperg Regime, July 1834 – February 1837 (pp. 218–269)
- Chapter 6: The Early Period of Othonian Absolutism and “Russian” Ascendancy, 1837–40 (pp. 270–343)
- Chapter 7: The Mavrokordatos Episode and the Near Eastern Crisis of 1839–41 (pp. 344–407)
- Chapter 8: The Later Period of Othonian Absolutism: “French” Ascendancy (1841–43) and the “Bloodless” Revolution of September 1843 (pp. 408–452)
- Chapter 9: The Period of the Constituent Assembly, September 1843 – March 1844 (pp. 455–500)

== Reception ==
Upon its release, Barbara Jelavich wrote that it is "the best book available in English on the general social, political, and cultural conditions of any East European country for the first half of the nineteenth century." George J. Marcopoulos called it "not only a first rate historical study, but one that breaks new ground in a very significant way". In 2008, Greek historian Antonis Liakos called it a landmark in Modern Greek historiography.
