= Carl Wilhelm von Heideck =

German general (1788–1861)

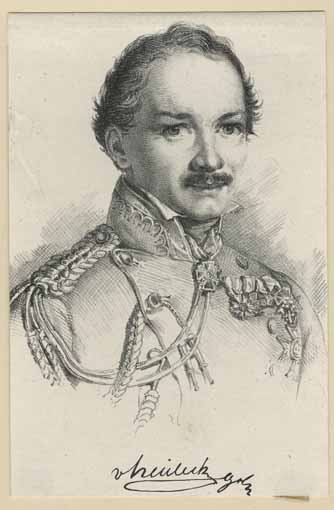
Carl Wilhelm von Heideck

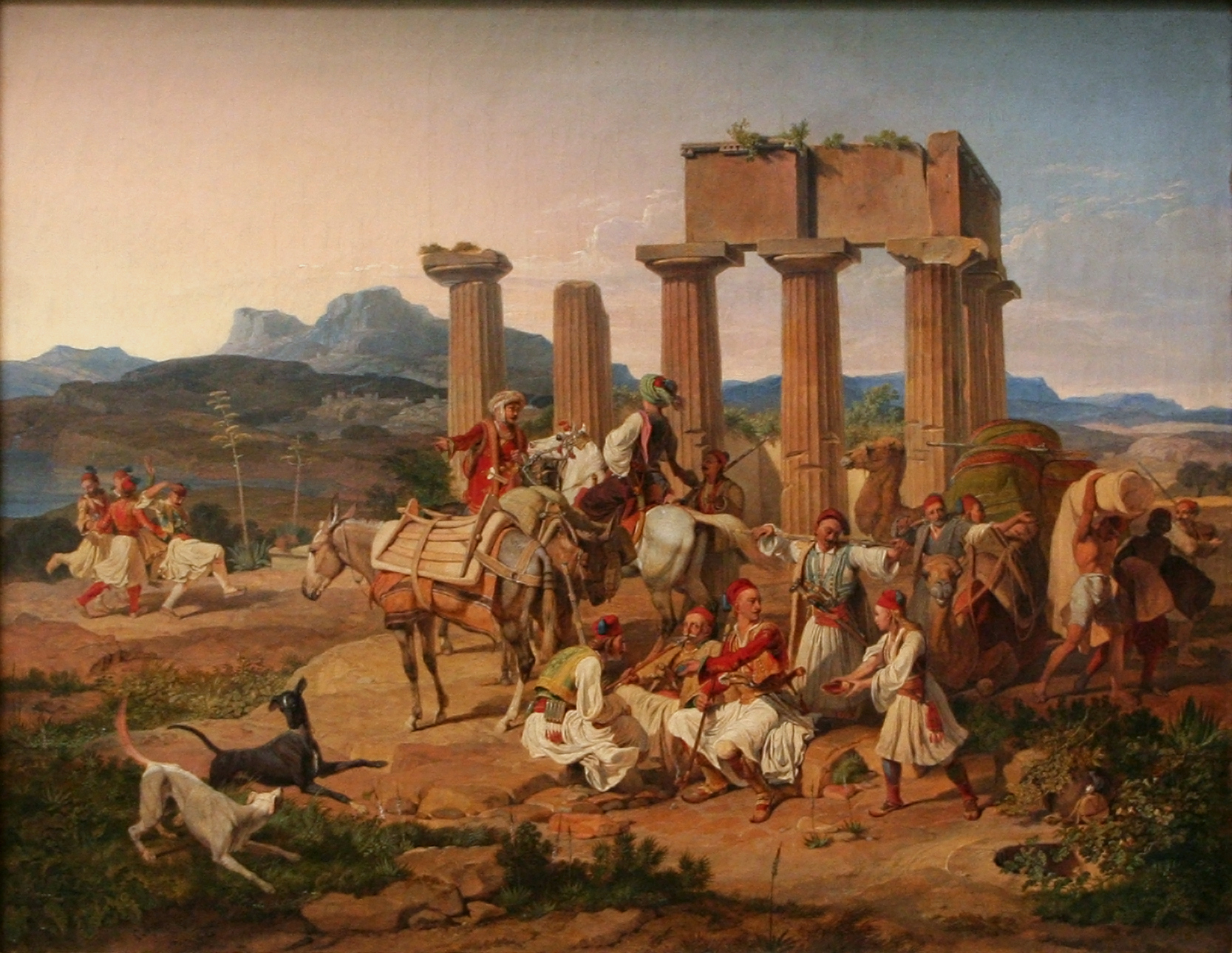
Carl Wilhelm von Heideck – Palicars in front of the Tempel at Corinth

Carl Wilhelm von Heideck (Greek: Κάρολος φον Χέυδεκ, born in Sarralbe, Moselle, on 6 December 1788 – died in Munich on 21 February 1861) was a Bavarian military officer, a philhellene and painter.

== Biography ==
Von Heideck studied art in Zürich. In 1801, he entered the military academy in Munich. Since 1805 he was in the Bavarian army, taking part in campaigns in Austria, Prussia and Tyrol, and then in Spain after 1810.

In 1814, with the rank of major, he accompanied the crown prince and future Ludwig I of Bavaria to the Congress of Vienna.

In 1826, he went to help the Greeks fight for their independence against the Ottoman Empire, during the Greek War of Independence.

In 1827, he took part under the orders of Thomas Gordon to the attempt to help the Acropolis of Athens. In June of the same year he bought three ancient Greek statues, including the Nike of Megara, just a month after the Provision of the Third National Assembly at Troezen that explicitly banned the sale and export of antiquities; thus he was not able to get the three statues out of the country.

In 1828, Ioannis Kapodistrias named him commander of Nafplion and a few months later military governor of Argos.

In 1830, he went back to Munich and got back his rank of colonel of the Bavarian army. He started again to paint.

In 1832, when Otto the second son of Ludwig I of Bavaria was designated to become king of Greece, Heideck was nominated to the regency council. It is traced, that he lived at Kasern Straße 12 (today Leonrodstraße) in Munich around 1850. The Heideckstraße in the quarter Neuhausen of Munich is named after him.
