= John A. Petropulos =

American historian (1929–1999)

- Born: 19 December 1929; Lewiston, Maine, U.S.
- Died: 3 May 1999 (aged 69); Amherst, Massachusetts, U.S.
- Education: Yale University (BA); Harvard University (PhD)
- Occupation: historian

John Anthony Petropulos (December 12, 1929 – May 3, 1999) was a Greek American historian of Modern Greek history.

Petropulos was born in 1929 in Lewiston, Maine to Greek immigrants. He received his B.A. from Yale in 1951 and his Ph.D. from Harvard in 1963. He joined the faculty of Amherst College in 1958, where he taught Balkan and Middle Eastern history. He died in his office on May 3, 1999, allegedly while correcting student papers.

His most influential work is Politics and Statecraft in the Kingdom of Greece, 1833–1843, published by Princeton University Press in 1968, a detailed analysis of the political parties of the period. Petropulos argued that the parties influenced state institutions as well as the structure of the state. The Greek translation has been edited by Nikiforos Diamandouros.

Petropulos was president of the Modern Greek Studies Association from 1974 to 1976.
