= Christoforos Merousis =

Greek athlete (born 1982)

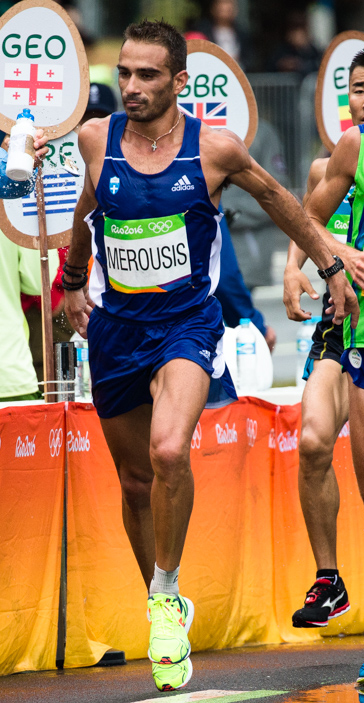
- Merousis at the 2016 Olympics

Personal information
- Born: 22 March 1982 (age 44) Chios, Greece
- Height: 178 cm (5 ft 10 in)
- Weight: 72 kg (159 lb)

Sport
- Sport: Track and field
- Event: Marathon

Achievements and titles
- Personal best: 2:19.00 (2015)

Christoforos Merousis (born 22 March 1982) is a Greek long-distance runner who specialises in the marathon. He competed in the men's marathon event at the 2016 Summer Olympics. He finished in 116th place with a time of 2:29:39.

Christoforos Merousis is the only Greek Athlete that has won the Greek Championship of the Athens Classic Marathon 4 consecutive years in a row, from 2013 to 2016.

== Competition record ==
Year	Competition	Venue	Position	Event	Notes
1999	1st IAAF World Youth Championships	Bydgoszcz, Poland	8th	2000 m Steeplechase Boys	5:55.01 -
2000	World Junior Championships	Santiago, Chile	16th (sf)	3000 m steeplechase	9:09.55
2001	European Junior Championships	Grosseto, Italy	3rd	3000 m steeplechase	8:51.87
2003	European Junior Championships	Tampere, Finland	3rd	3000 m steeplechase	8:55.69
2003	European U23 Championships	Bydgoszcz, Poland	9th	10,000 m	29:56.92
2009	Mediterranean Games	Pescara, Italy	6th	10,000 m	30:16.99
2015	Athens Classic Marathon	Athens, Greece	1st	Marathon	2:21:22
2016	Spetses mini Marathon	Spetses, Greece	1st	25 km	1:26:15
2016	Summer Olympics	Rio de Janeiro, Brazil	116th	Marathon	2:29:39
2016	Athens Classic Marathon	Athens, Greece	10th	Marathon	2:24:58
2017	Athens Classic Marathon	Athens, Greece	9th	Marathon	2:28:19
2018	Athens Classic Marathon	Athens, Greece	8th	Marathon	2:23:43
