= Hatzigiannis Mexis =

- Χατζηγιάννης Μέξης
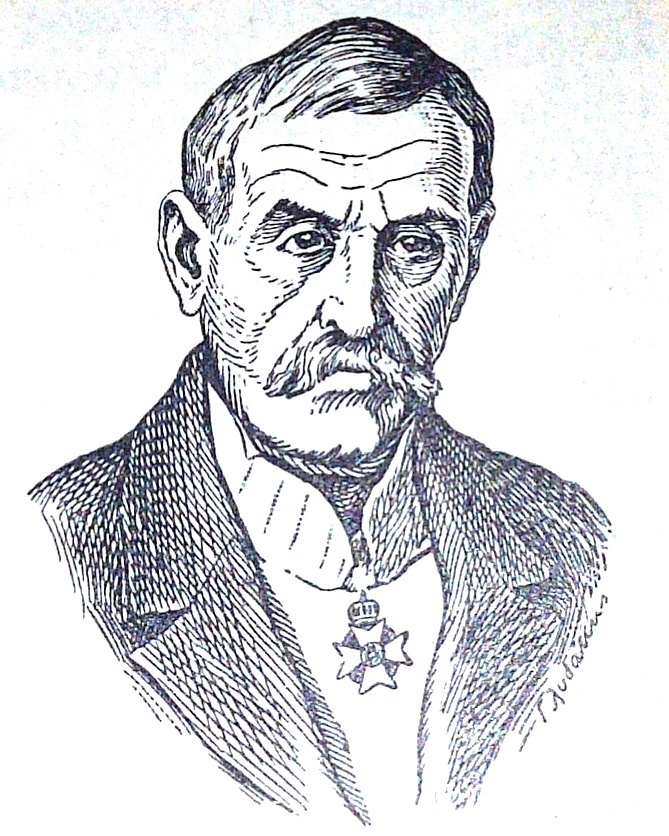

Personal details
- Born: c. 1754 Spetses, Ottoman Empire (now Greece)
- Died: 23 August 1844 Spetses, Kingdom of Greece
- Spouse: Diamanto Moraitis
- Relations: Thodorakis Mexis (Brother)
- Children: Theodoros Mexis, (Son) Nikolaos Mexis, (Son) Panagiotis Mexis, (Son) Georgios Mexis, (Son) and 4 Daughters
- Parent: Theodoros Mexis (Father)
- Occupation: Ship-owner; Revolutionary; Politician

Military service
- Allegiance: (Greece) First Hellenic Republic; Kingdom of Greece
- Battles/wars: Greek War of Independence

Hatzigiannis Mexis (Greek: Χατζηγιάννης Μέξης; Albanian: Haxhijani Meksi) or "Ioannis Mexis" (c. 1754 - 1844) was the first governor of Spetses and shipowner with considerable power and wealth, who played an important role in the Greek revolution of 1821 in which he participated with four of his ships and in the newly formed Greek state.

== Biography ==
His father was Theodoros Mexis(Meksi in Albanian), an Albanian chieftain of Labovë. His family descend from the noble Meksi family. Due to the persecutions of the Ottomans, he fled to Leonidio in Kynouria and then to Spetses. Ioannis was the first-born, his younger brother was Thodorakis Mexis. Near the end of the 1790s, Ioannis Mexis traveled to the Holy Lands and from then on he took the surname Hatzis and is referred to as Hatzigiannis. He was active in trade and the sea from a young age with great success due to his resourcefulness and risk-taking nature.

Hatzigiannis Mexis had become a member of the Filiki Eteria and was the leader of the aristocratic section of Spetses who did not want to participate in the Greek Revolution of 1821. But immediately after the start of the revolution, he reconciled with the leader of the popular party Botasi and together they raised the flag of the Greek revolution in Spetses, and he urged Hydra and Psara to do the same and became one of its most ardent supporters and organizers her. He brought out four of his ships in the joint fight, "Themistocles", "Epaminondas", "Leonidas" and "Pericles". All four were well equipped. Other ships of Mexi, in which he had a share, took part in the fight.

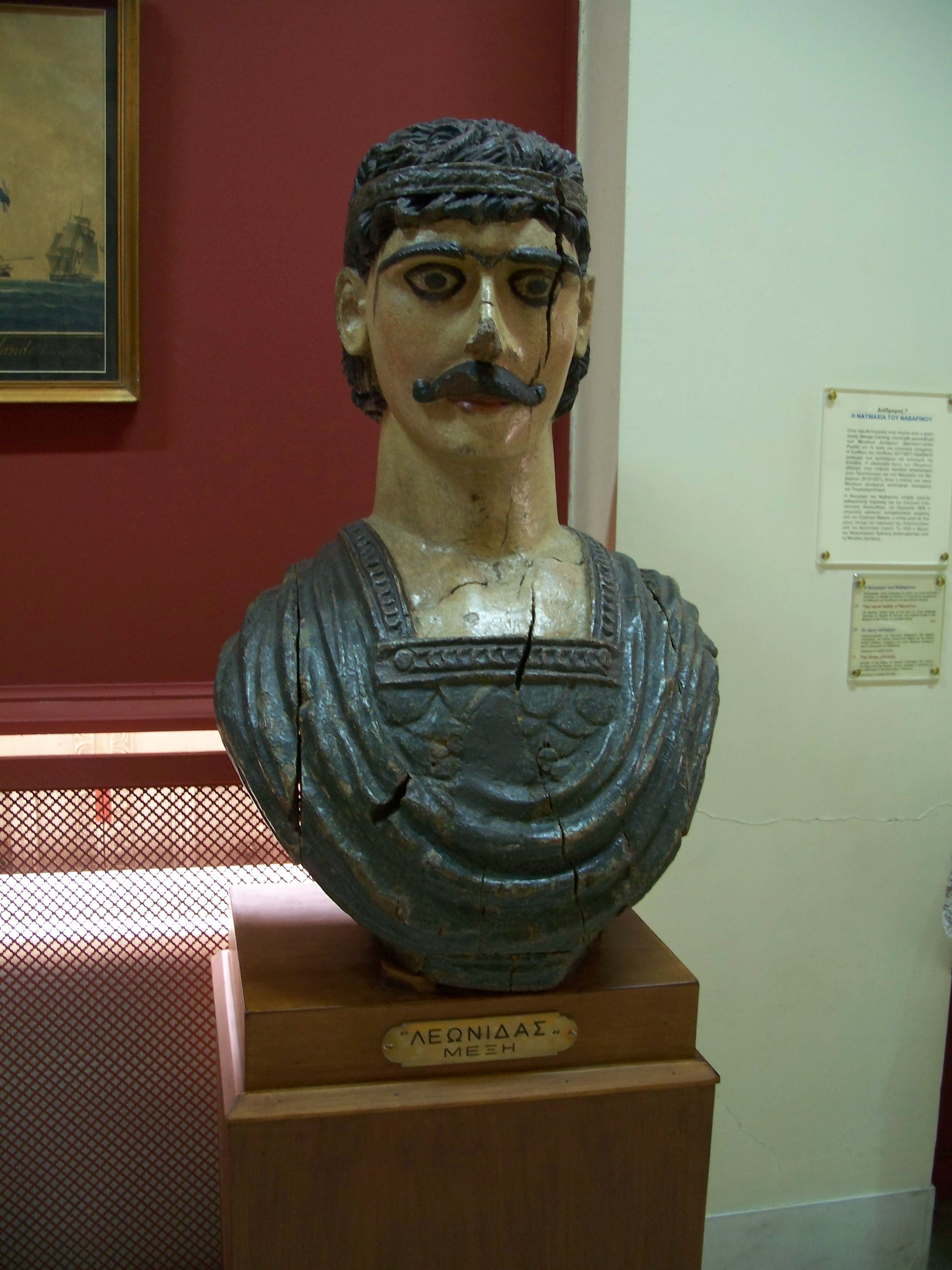
Figurehead of the ship "Leonidas" of greek revolutionary Hatzigiannis Meksis (Χατζηγιάννης Μέξης). National Historical Museum, Athens, Greece.

But he was also distinguished for his imposing and esteemed physiognomy, his determination, his activity and his courage. He personally took part in the various battles and was a delegate to the 1st National Assembly of Epidaurus and the 2nd National Assembly of Astros. When the Revolution ended, he was elected State Counselor, Senator and Plenipotentiary from Spetses. Otto of Greece honored him with the Golden Cross.

He died in 1844.

== Family ==
His wife was Diamanto Moraitis, daughter of merchant Nikolos Moraitis from the Peloponnese. He had nine children: Four sons and five daughters, with whose marriages he strengthened his relations with most of the Speciotian families.

His sons were Theodoros and Nikolaos, Panagiotis and Georgios. Theodoros became a deputy of Spetses and Nicolaos mayor of Spetses senator, plenipotentiary, plenipotentiary of Spetses and minister during the eviction of Othon. Panagiotis (1800-1885) participated in the revolution with a privately owned ship and became the president of the Spetses Eldership. For his sons it is stated that they had married daughters of the Vassilis Gini, Laskarina Bouboulina and Lazarai.

The youngest Georgios (1810-1837), married to the daughter of Georgios Kountouriotis from Hydra, died aged 27 in Nafplio.

== His mansion ==
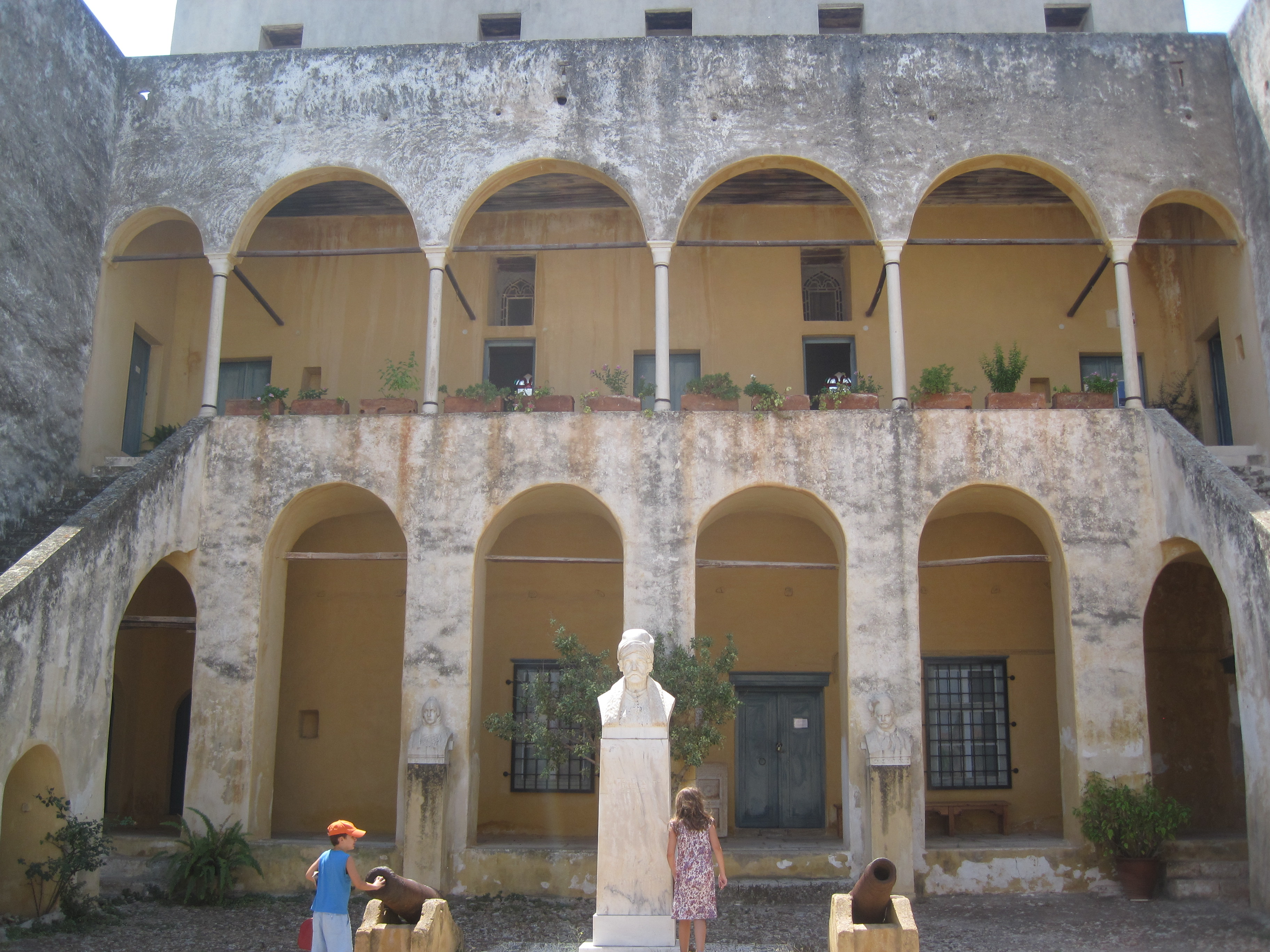
Hatzigiannis Mexis Mansion (Spetses Museum)

The mansion of Hatzigianni Mexis was built between the years 1795-1798 and 1938, it was donated to the state by Kalomira Mexis and Niketa Thermisioti-Katsina, his heirs and it houses the Spetses Museum and the island's historical archive.
