= 2003 European Athletics U23 Championships – Men's 10,000 metres =

The men's 10,000 metres event at the 2003 European Athletics U23 Championships was held in Bydgoszcz, Poland, at Zawisza Stadion on 18 July.

== Medalists ==
Gold	Ioannis Kanellopoulos; Greece
Silver	Vasyl Matviychuk; Ukraine
Bronze	Paweł Ochal; Poland

== Results ==
=== Final ===
18 July

Rank	Name	Nationality	Time	Notes
1st place, gold medalist(s)	Ioannis Kanellopoulos	Greece	29:00.78	
2nd place, silver medalist(s)	Vasyl Matviychuk	Ukraine	29:01.29	
3rd place, bronze medalist(s)	Paweł Ochal	Poland	29:17.41	
4	Ihor Heletiy	Ukraine	29:18.92	
5	Adam Sutton	United Kingdom	29:27.49	
6	Liberato Pellecchia	Italy	29:54.06	
7	Joep Tigchelaar	Netherlands	29:54.91	
8	David Solis	Spain	29:56.72	
9	Hristoforos Merousis	Greece	29:56.92	
10	Miguel Ángel Gamonal	Spain	30:14.13	
11	Jakub Burghardt	Poland	31:17.49	

== Participation ==
According to an unofficial count, 11 athletes from 7 countries participated in the event.

- Greece (2)
- Italy (1)
- Netherlands (1)
- Poland (2)
- Spain (2)
- Ukraine (2)
- United Kingdom (1)
