= Georgios Panou =

Georgios Panou (Greek: Γεώργιος Πάνου; c. 1770 – 1 June 1863) was a Greek ship-owner, member of the Filiki Eteria, fighter and politician of the Greek War of Independence from Spetses. He was distinguished for his participation in the naval operations of the Greek revolution.

== Biography ==
=== Prerevolutionary period ===
Panou was born in about 1770 in Spetses. He was the son of the notable, Nikolaos Panou. Since his childhood, he received maritime training and made several trips, at first, alongside his father and his uncle and then with other ship-owners. As a result, Panou visited various places of the Mediterranean Sea (Asia Minor, Italy, etc.). Gradually, he became a ship-owner taking some elementary education in Livorno at the prompting of the merchant Ioannis Zoukis. In 1813, he built his sailboat "Solon", which was used during the Greek Revolution. In 1814, he was appointed by the Ottomans in the position of commander of Spetses.

=== Filiki Eteria and revolution ===
Later, he a member of Filiki Eteria probably by Panagiotis Sekeris from Tripolitsa. He initiated several persons in the organization, among them important people from Arcadia and Spetses. In 1818, he was appointed along with Botassis and Fatziolatis, as curator of the Filiki Eteria in Spetses while in 1819 he helped Athanasios Tsakalov to escape from Ermioni in Argolis after the murder of Nikolaos Galatis. A few months before the beginning of the Revolution, when Papaflessas arrived in Spetses, Panou followed the revolutionary dictates of the clergyman. With his sailboat "Solon" he participated in the siege of Monemvasia as head of the naval of Spetses and the rest Greek forces that were making the exclusion of the city. After the occupation of Monemvasia, he took part in the siege of Nafplio. In April 1823 he took part as a proxy of Spetses in the National Assembly of Astros and in 1825 he was prefect of Monemvasia. During 1827, he participated in the unsuccessful operation of Thomas Cochrane against the Egyptian fleet in the harbor of Alexandria.

=== Following years ===
After the end of the Revolution and the creation of the Greek State, Panou was occupied with the trade sector but a significant financial loss forced him to seek help of the state, which in 1836 recognized him the monthly income of 150 drachmas. He died on 1 June 1863 at the age of 93 years. A short time before he died, he received the silver medal of the Savior for his contribution in the Greek War of Independence.

== Bibliography ==
- Anastasios N. Goudas, Βίοι Παράλληλοι των επί της αναγεννήσεως της Ελλάδος διαπρεψάντων ανδρών, Εκ του Τυπογραφείου Μ. Π. Περίδου, Athens, 1875, vol. 7.
- Dionisios Kokkinos, Η Ελληνική Επανάστασις, εκδόσεις Μέλισσα, 6th edition, Athens 1974.
