= Diomidis Kyriakos =

Greek politician (1811–1869)

- Διομήδης Κυριάκος
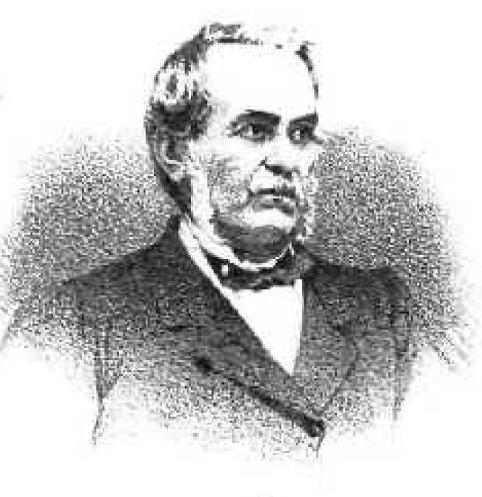
- Kyriakou in 1865

Prime Minister of Greece
- In office 27 March 1863 – 29 April 1863
- Monarch: Interregnum
- Preceded by: Zinovios Valvis
- Succeeded by: Benizelos Roufos

Personal details
- Born: 1811 Spetses, Ottoman Empire
- Died: 1869 (aged 57-58) Pisa, Italy

Diomidis Kyriakos (Greek: Διομήδης Κυριάκος) (1811, Spetses – 1869, Pisa) was a Greek author, politician and Prime Minister of Greece.

== Biography ==
Kiriakos was born in 1811 on the island of Spetses to a family of Arvanite origin. He was the younger brother of Ioannis Kyriakos, a vice-admiral who was killed in the siege of Messolonghi. He studied law at the universities of Pisa and Paris. In 1835, Kyriakos became a public prosecutor of the Court of First Instance. In 1843, he helped draft the Constitution of Greece. In 1851, he became a professor of constitutional law and, in 1862, a member of the committee to draft a new constitution. The following year, Kyriakos became the Minister of Religion and Education and, between April and May 1863, he became the Prime Minister of Greece. Kyriakos authored several books on law and history. He died in Italy in 1869.

Political offices
| Preceded by Zinovios Valvis | Prime Minister of Greece; 27 March 1863 – 29 April 1863 | Succeeded by Benizelos Roufos |
