= Spetsopoula =

Island in Greece

Native name: Σπετσοπούλα
- Interactive map of Spetsopoula

Geography
- Coordinates: 37.22°N 23.17°E
- Archipelago: Saronic Islands
- Area: 2 km^{2} (0.77 sq mi)

Administration
- Greece
- Region: Attica
- Regional unit: Islands

Demographics
- Population: 0 (2011)

Spetsopoula (Greek: Σπετσοπούλα) is an island situated to the southeast of Spetses, which is one of the Saronic Islands, in the region of Attica and the Aegean Sea. It lies 90 kilometres (56 miles) from Athens. Its area is about 2 Km^{2}. According to 2011 census the island is uninhabited but the previous census (2001) reported a population of 8 inhabitants.

== Historical information ==
The ancient name of the island was Aristera and is referred by Greek traveler and geographer Pausanias. The modern name means small Spetses and owes it in the nearby Spetses. In 1962 the island was purchased by Greek shipping magnate Stavros Niarchos. Spetsopoula is linked with the death of Eugenia Livanos, former wife of Stavros Niarchos. She was found dead on the island on 4 May 1970. The island is still owned by descendants of Stavros Niarchos. Spetsopoula is often visited by people of high society, friends of Niarchos family.

=== Historical population ===
Year	Population
1991	11
2001	8
2011	0

== In wider culture ==
Spetsopoula is one of the settings of Richard H. White's 2013 novel Miro's Knot. The book describes Spetsopoula as it was in 1967. As of 2024, Miro's Knot is in development to be made into a feature film.
