= Poseidonion Grand Hotel =

Luxury hotel in Spetses, Greece

Coordinates: 37.2685°N 23.1549°E

- Interactive map of the Poseidonion Grand Hotel area

General information
- Opening: 1914; 112 years ago
- Owner: Anargyrios and Korgialenios School of Spetses.
- Management: Protovoulia Spetson S.A.

Other information
- Number of rooms: 52

Website
- www.poseidonion.com

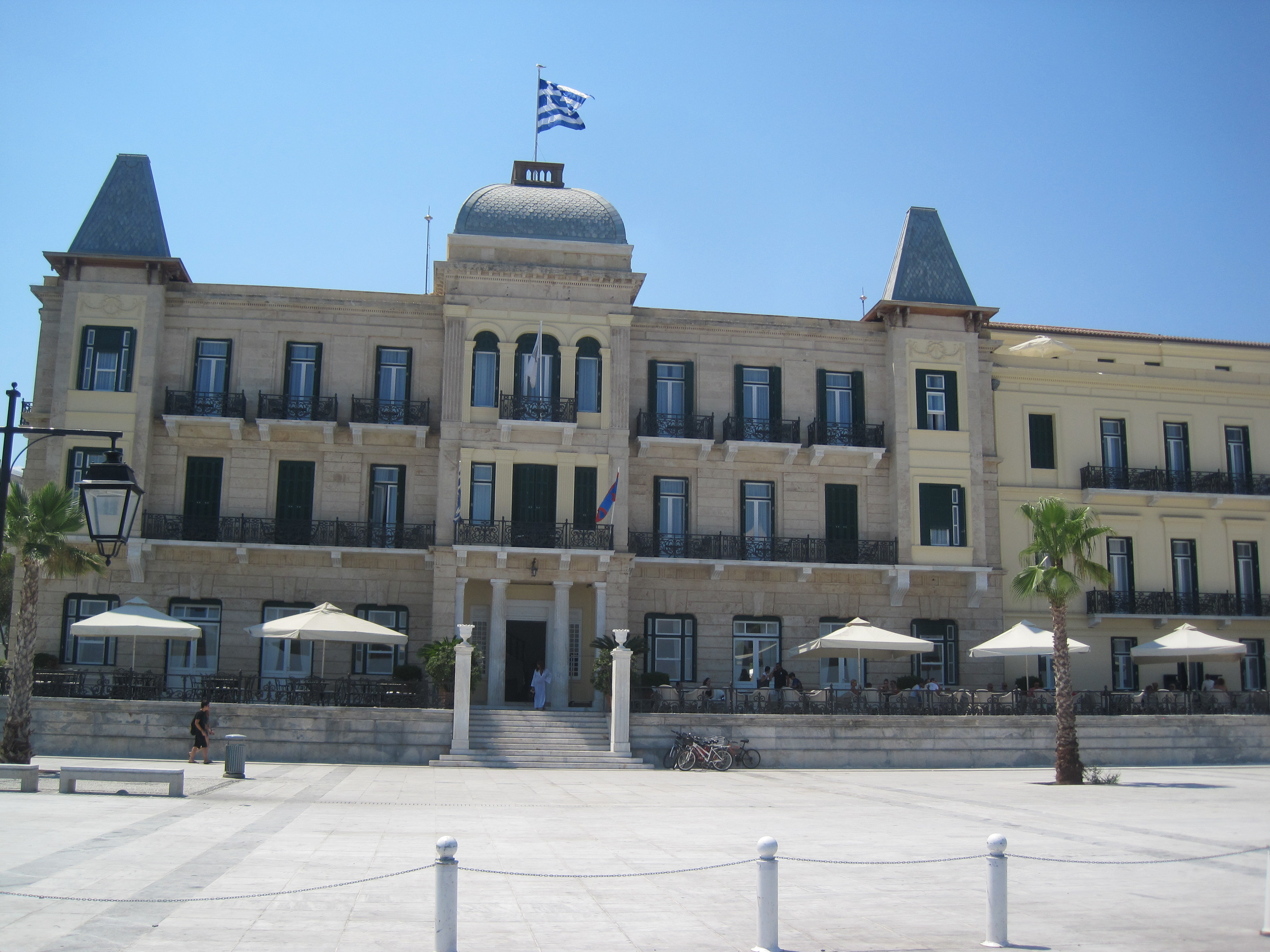

The Poseidonion Grand Hotel (Greek: Ξενοδοχείο Ποσειδώνιο) is a luxury hotel on the island of Spetses, Greece.

Each of the 55 rooms is decorated with a mix of antique and modern furniture with references to the colonial era.

It is an example of Neoclassical architecture and was inspired by the InterContinental Carlton Cannes Hotel in Cannes and The Negresco in Nice.

It was the first hotel in Greece to offer spa treatments, whereby four small pools were filled with warm water and sulphur in order for the treatments to take place.

The hotel has won awards from Conde Nast Traveller.

It sponsors the Spetses Classic Yacht Race organized by the Yacht Club of Greece and the Spetses mini Marathon.

Elizabeth Taylor, Marilyn Monroe, and Robert F. Kennedy stayed at the hotel in the 1960s.

== History ==
The hotel opened in 1914. It was developed by Sotirios Anargiros, a visionary Greek benefactor who was responsible for much of the development of the island.

After a 5-year renovation, the hotel re-opened in 2009. Apart from the historic wing, which houses 38 rooms, an annex with 17 rooms looking onto the Mediterranean garden and a 17-meter lap pool, and a 300 square meter spa was added.
