= Velopoula =

Island in Greece

Coordinates: 36°55′05″N 23°27′37″E

Velopoula (Greek: Βελοπούλα) is an island situated to the southeast of Spetses, which is one of the Saronic Islands, in the Greek region of Attica and the Aegean Sea. A lighthouse is located on the island.
