= Vasilios Lazarou =

Spetsiote politician

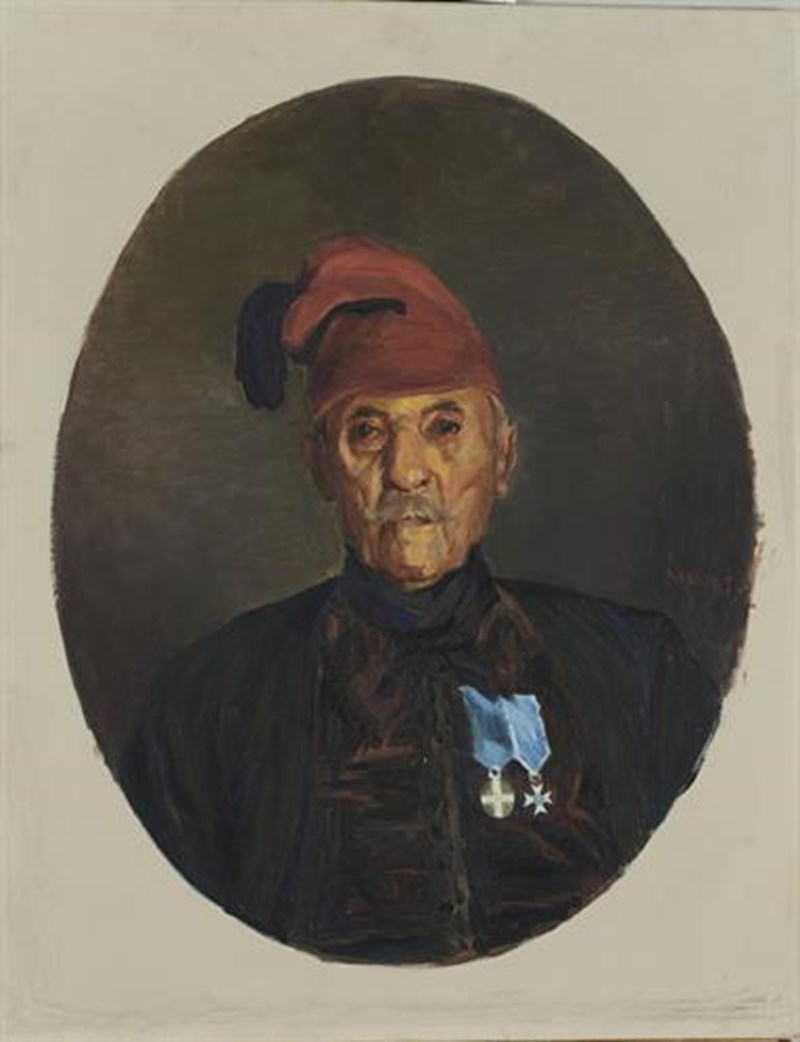
- Vasilios Lazarou
- Native name: Βασίλειος Λαζάρου
- Born: c. 1782; Spetses, Ottoman Empire (now Greece)
- Died: 1862(aged 79-80)
- Allegiance: (Greece) First Hellenic Republic
- Branch: Greek Revolutionary Army
- Conflicts: Greek War of Independence

Vasilios N. Lazarou-Orlof (Greek: Βασίλειος Ν. Λαζάρου Ορλώφ; c. 1782–1862) was a Greek shipowner, fighter in the Greek War of Independence and politician.

== Early life ==
He was born in Spetses and came from the Maniot Lazarou family. The son of Nikolaos, the Lazarou were wealthy shipowners in Spetses, often called Orlof, a nickname they acquired due to their participation in the Orlofika. He married Marousso, daughter of Hatzigiannis T. Mexis. Laskarina Bouboulina also had relatives within the family; her mother married Dimitrios Lazarou Orlof in a second marriage.

== Career ==
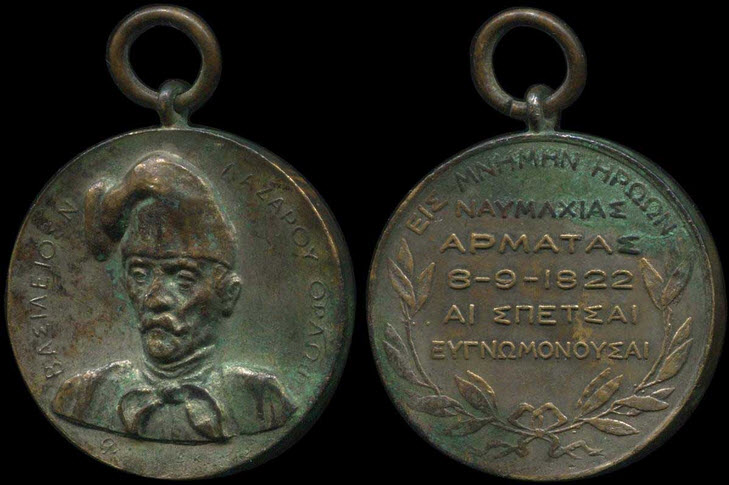
Medal of 1922 for the 100 years of the naval battle of Spetses 8-9-1822 in the form of Vassiliou N. Lazarou-Orlof

He was the prefect of the island and one of the first Spetsians to be initiated into the Philiki Etairia. On April 2, 1821, he took part in a meeting with the men of Spetses to decide whether to join the revolution. No decision was made that night, although Lazaruo, along with other Spetsians, occupied the command post. After this event and applause from the people on April 3, the revolution was officially declared on the island. He took part as a representative of Spetses in the 2nd National Assembly of Astros in 1823, in the 3rd National Assembly of Epidaurus in 1826 and in the 5th National Assembly in 1832 .

In 1930, at the centenary celebrations of the end of the Greek revolution, a bronze medal was minted in his honor.
