= Spetses =

Spetses Σπέτσες
- Municipality
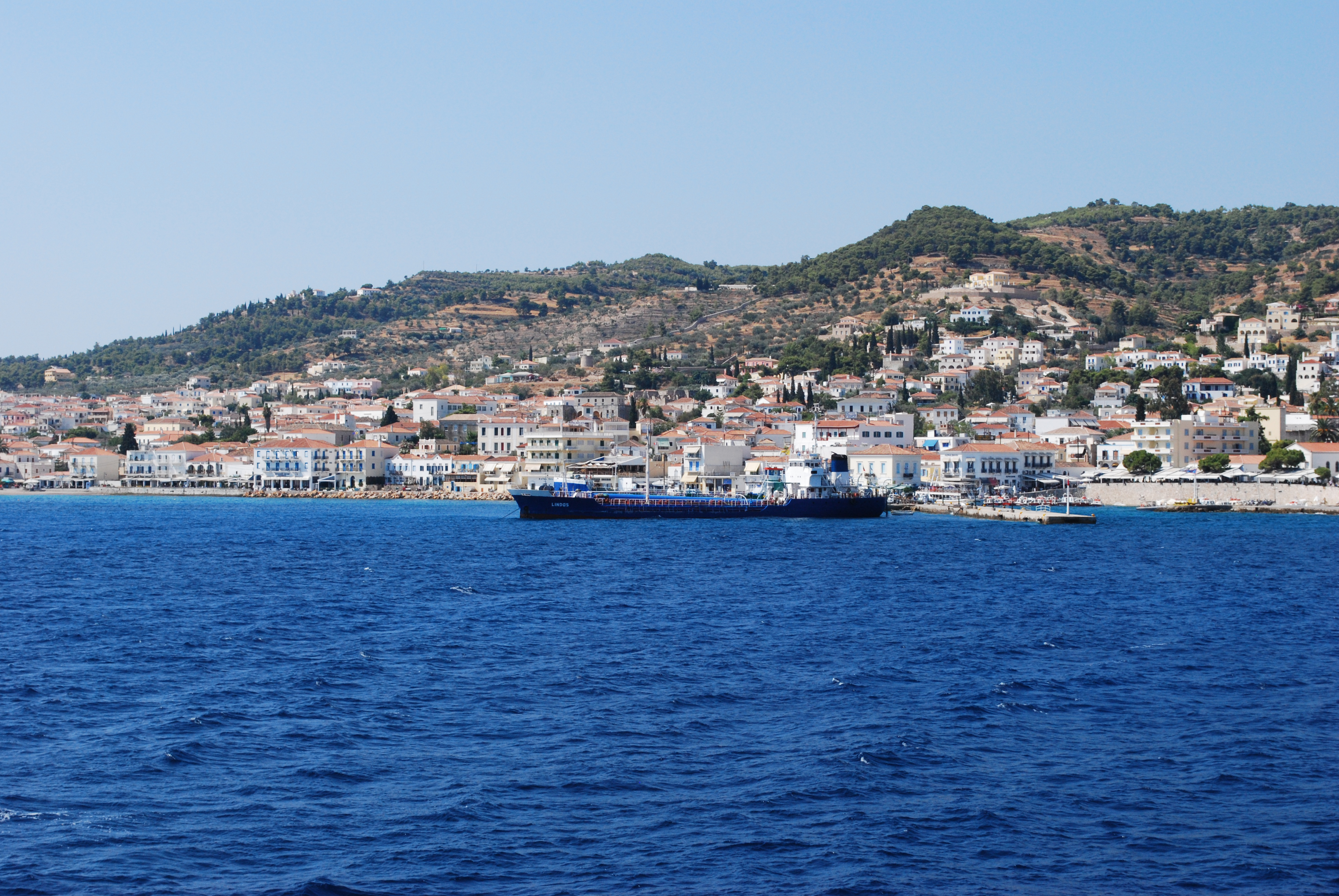

- Flag

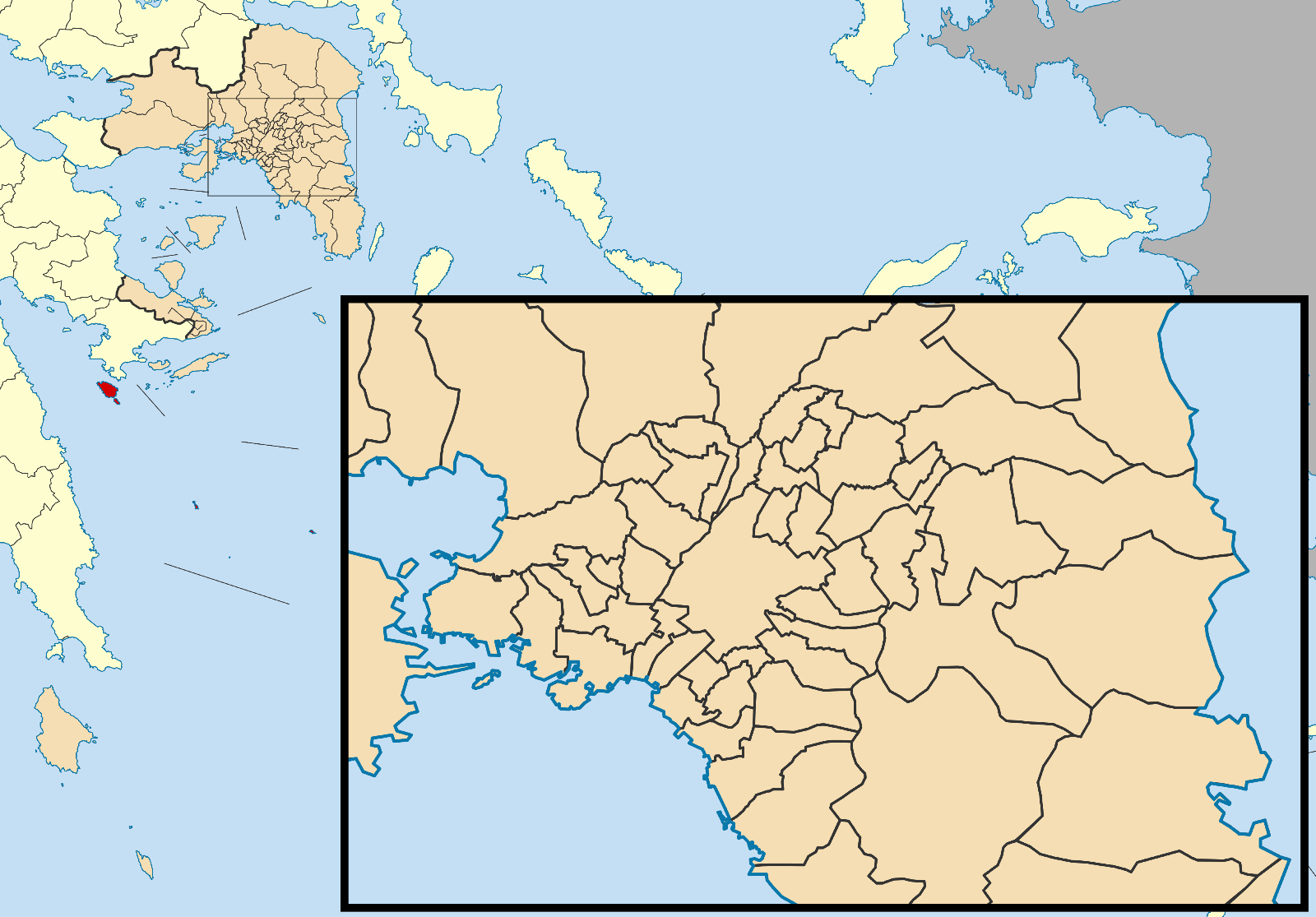

- Location within Greece
- Coordinates: 37°15′27″N 23°08′24″E
- Country: Greece
- Administrative region: Attica
- Regional unit: Islands

Government
  - Mayor: Evgenia Frangia (since 2023)

Area
  - Municipality: 27.121 km^{2} (10.471 sq mi)

Population (2021)
  - Municipality: 3,748
  - Density: 138.2/km^{2} (357.9/sq mi)
- Time zone: UTC+2 (EET)
  - Summer (DST): UTC+3 (EEST)
- Postal code: 180 50
- Area code: 22980
- Vehicle registration: Z
- Website: spetses.gov.gr

Spetses (Greek: Σπέτσες, Ancient Greek: Πιτυοῦσσα "Pityussa") is an island in Attica, Greece. It is counted among the Saronic Islands group. Until 1948, it was part of the Argolis and Corinthia Prefecture, which is now split into Argolis and Corinthia. In ancient times, it was known as Pityussa.

The island is now an independent municipality, with no internal boundaries within the municipality. The town of Spetses is the only large settlement on the island. The other settlements on the island are Moní Ayíon Pánton, Ligonéri, Ágioi Anárgyroi, Kouzoúnos. Also part of the Municipality of Spetses are the islands of Spetsopoula, Falkonera, and Velopoula (all uninhabited). The municipality has an area of 27.121 km^{2}.

An unusual aspect of Spetses is that no private automobiles are allowed within the town limits. The most common modes of transport are walking, horse-drawn carriages, bicycles, mopeds, and motorcycles. Only taxis and delivery vehicles are allowed in the downtown area. Ferries and high-speed hydrofoils arrive regularly from the Athenian port of Piraeus.

Trails encircle the island and total about 25 to 30 km. Beaches closest to the town of Spetses include Ayios Mamas in the town centre; and Kaíki (previously College) beach 1 kilometre (0.6 miles) to the northwest and Ayia Marina 2 kilometres (1 mile) to the south, both of which offer water-sports. Public buses serve beaches further outside town, including Zogeria, Ayioi Anaryiroi, and Ayia Paraskevi.

== Etymology ==
The name of the island derives from the Medieval and Modern Greek noun σπέτσες, spétses 'spices, herbs', which in turn derives from the Italian and Venetian spezie 'spices'. The Ancient Greek name for the island Πιτυοῦσσα describes its forested nature 'abounding in pine trees'.

== History ==
The island of Spetses, located in the Mediterranean Sea, was first occupied during the Mesolithic Age, in around 8000 BC. During that period the island was connected by an isthmus to the mainland of Argolida, at the point now named Kosta. Pieces of flint from that time were found near the part of the island named Zogeria, containing a water source probably available since the same period. Other archaeological finds were located in the area of Saint Marina, the site of the first Hellenic settlement to be found on the island, dating to the 3rd millennium BC. At least three natural harbours of Spetses (Saint Marina, Saint Paraskevi, and Zogeria) served as a refuge for ships carrying goods to and from the Argolis Gulf during the peak of the State of Lerna (about 2300 BC).

After the collapse of the State of Lerna, Spetses suffered a period of decline. Artefacts in the areas of Saint Marina and Saint Anargyroi are characteristic of the existing settlements belonging the late Mycenaean period; the 12th to 13th century BC. At the time of the Peloponnesian War, stone observatories were built at the sites of Prophet Elias and Zogeria.

Mention of the island of Spetses was made both by Strabo in the 1st century BC and Pausanias in the 2nd century AD, referring to the island as Pitiousa. The raid by the Goths in the Eastern Roman empire caused a wave of refugees to flee to Spetses, resulting in the re-settlement of the island. They were concentrated in the Old Port, which became one of the three largest cities of Argolis (including Argos and Hermione).

=== Venetian and Ottoman rule ===
In the 15th century, the Venetians, who had ruled the island since 1220, named it Spezia ("Spice") for its position on a major traderoute that dealt in spices. Over time the name was Hellenised to Spetsai (Spetse/Spetses).

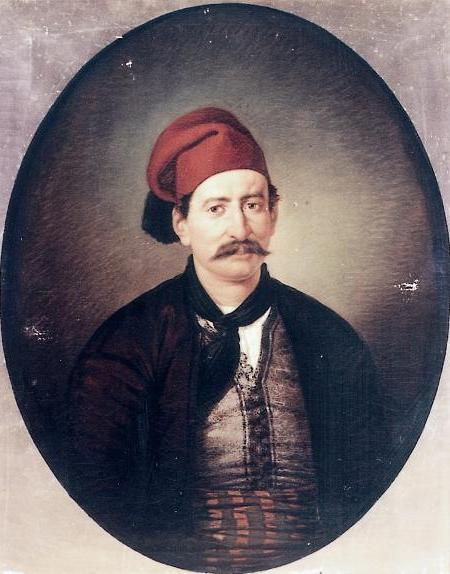
Portrait of Ioannis Kyriakou, fighter of the Greek War of Independence, from Spetses.

During the 18th century, after the conquest of the Peloponnese by the Ottomans and the Venetian expulsion, many Arvanites took refuge in Spetses in order to escape Ottoman persecution. These refugees created the old village of Spetses, in the area of Kastelli; it is fortified by a wall that reinforces the natural protection provided by the terrain. Over the years the island developed a significant naval power. The Greek Coalition, in cooperation with the Russians in the Russo-Turkish War of 1768–1774, turned the powerful merchant fleet of Spetses to a significant power against the Ottoman Empire during the so-called Orlov Revolt, also known as the Orlofika. In response to these events, in 1770 the Turks destroyed the only village on the island.

For some years after the destruction of the village, the island was deserted. It was re-occupied in 1774 by new settlers from the opposite coast of the Peloponnese after the Treaty of Küçük Kaynarca. This allowed the Russians free movement of ships in the Mediterranean. A powerful commercial fleet was recreated by using the Russian flag to establish trade routes with neighbouring countries. Merchant seafaring was the only source of livelihood for men of many of the rocky, non-arable Greek islands, and the brisk Mediterranean and Black Sea trade of the 18th and 19th centuries allowed them to prosper. They did especially and spectacularly so during the trade embargoes that were imposed during the Napoleonic Wars; Greek merchantmen and crews were willing and able to work with, or against, both belligerent sides at tremendous profit.

After the re-occupation of Spetses, the settlement began to expand beyond the Kastelli region. This growth stimulated a corresponding increase in the maritime economic activities of the island.

An Arvanite community still inhabits the island.

=== War of Independence ===
From 1821, the island played an important role in the Greek War of Independence, and it was the home of celebrated war heroine Laskarina Bouboulina. Her life sized statue can be seen in the main dock. Spetses was the first of the Greek islands to raise the flag of Revolution on the morning of 3 April (O.S.) 1821. Its fleet, consisting of merchant ships, played a key role in the struggle, both by participating in raids against the Turkish coast and the siege of fortresses in the Peloponnese. Particularly important is the involvement of the Spetsiote fleet in sieges of the fortresses of Nafplion and Monemvasia and naval battles of Samos (1824) and Kafireas (1825). Along with their counterparts in nearby Hydra, Spetsiote captains were so wealthy they had been hoarding their gold in wells, a wealth that they tapped to fund the war of liberation.

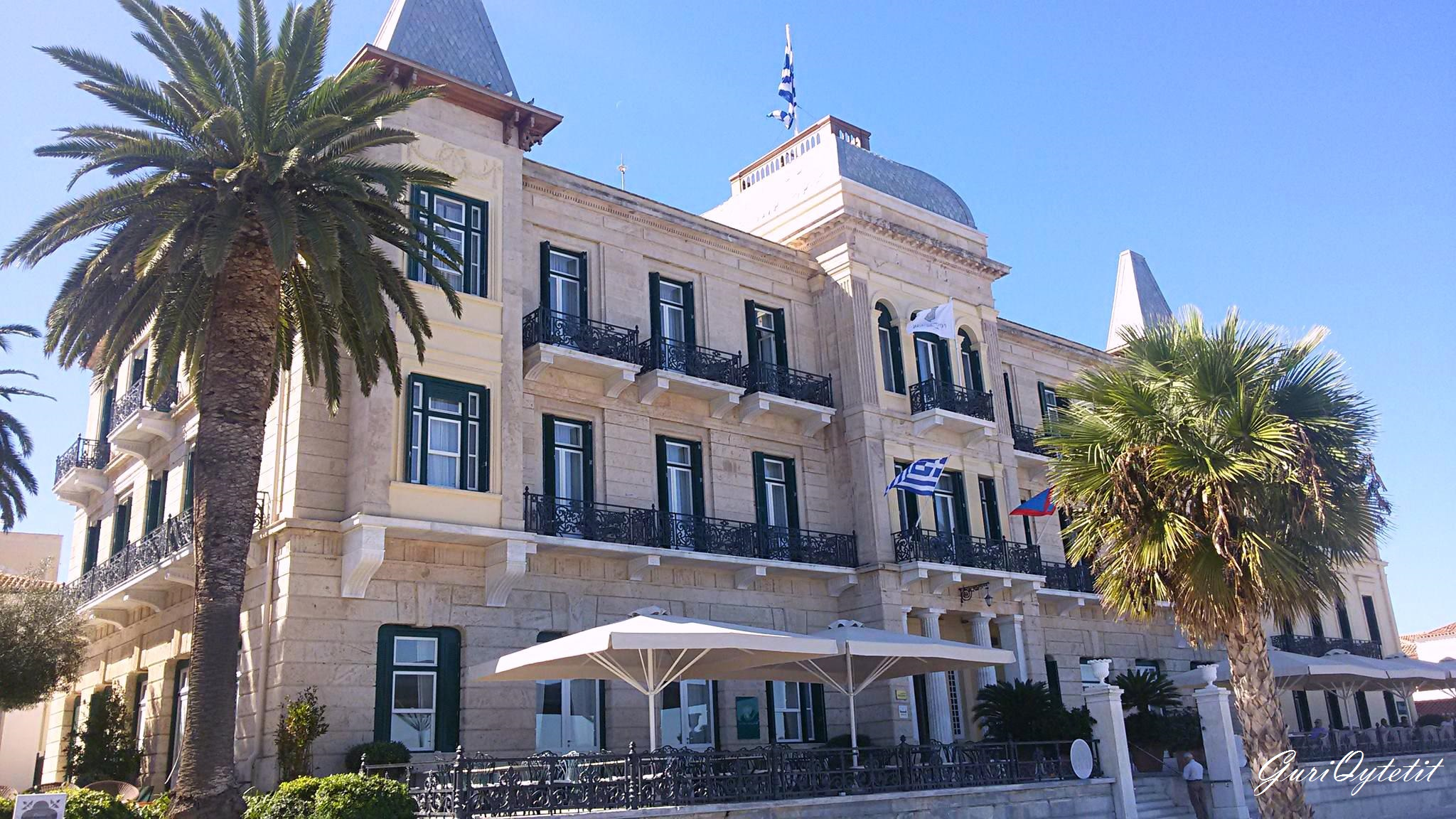
The Poseidonion Hotel of Spetses

Several ships have been named after the island, including modern Hydra class frigate F 453 Spetsai, the World War 2-era Greek destroyer Spetsai (D83), and the historic Greek battleship Spetsai.

=== Modern ===
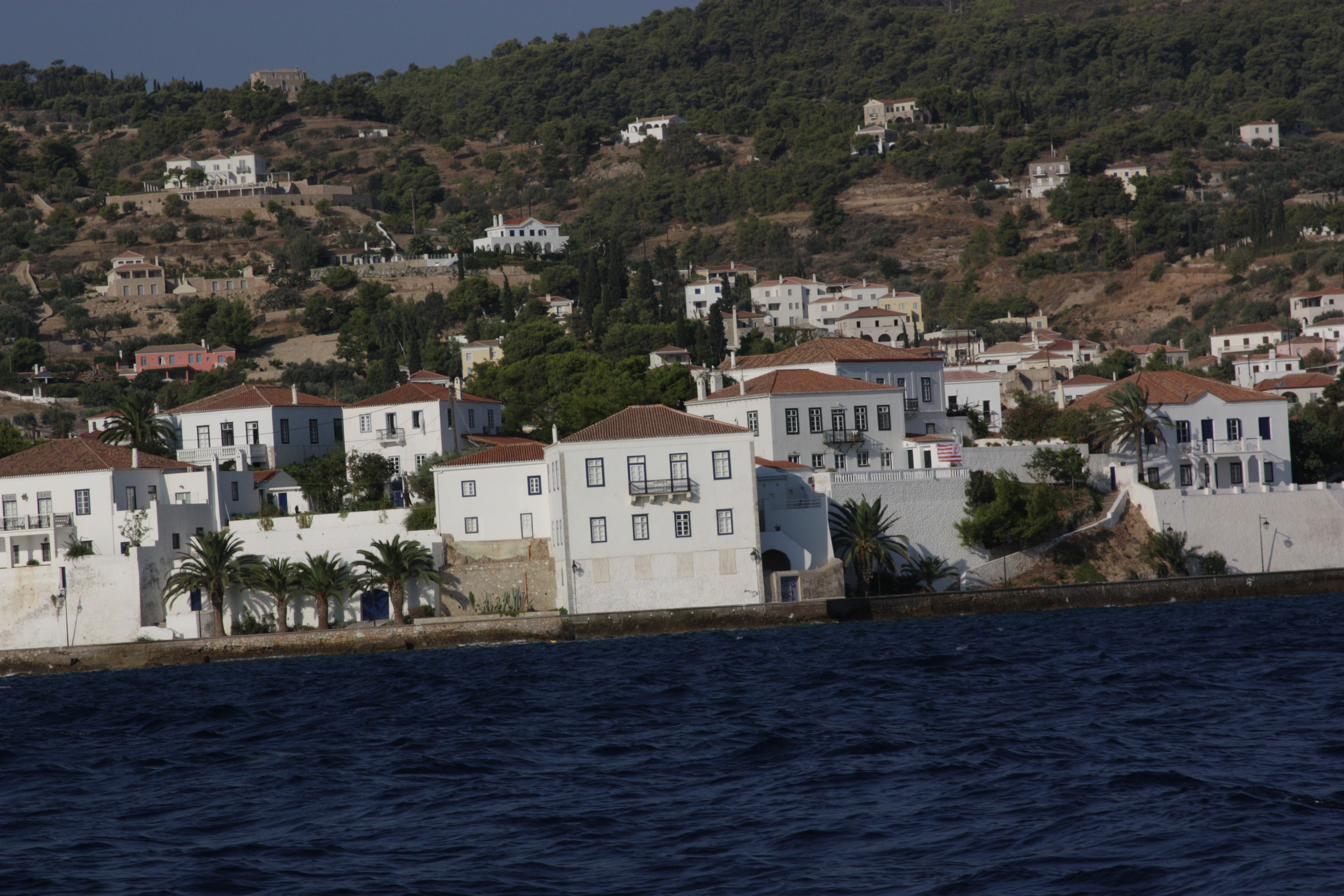
View of the seafront

The Poseidonion Hotel was built by Sotirios Anargyros, descendant of a great 18th-century Spetsiot shipping family. His branch of the family had fallen on hard times, and he emigrated to the United States as a young man in 1868, when Spetses was declining as a maritime center. In 1899 he returned from the US, now a wealthy tobacco tycoon and started to transform the island of his youth. He built a mansion and met with rich Athenians who visited Spetses from August to October, in order to hunt the turtledoves and quail migrating between Africa and Europe. Anargyros had pine seedlings planted in the hills. In the early 21st century, the island is one of the most wooded in the southern Aegean.

He saw the need for a comfortable hotel and built the Poseidonion in the style of its French Mediterranean models, the Carlton in Cannes (1911) and the Negresco in Nice (1912). The hunters could bring along their wives and children to enjoy the comfort of the hotel, the spa, donkey rides, dancing to the orchestra in the evening, and mixed bathing on the beaches across the channel. The Poseidonion rapidly became the favorite vacation spot for high society, royalty, and the rich Athenians who came to enjoy a small slice of the grand life.

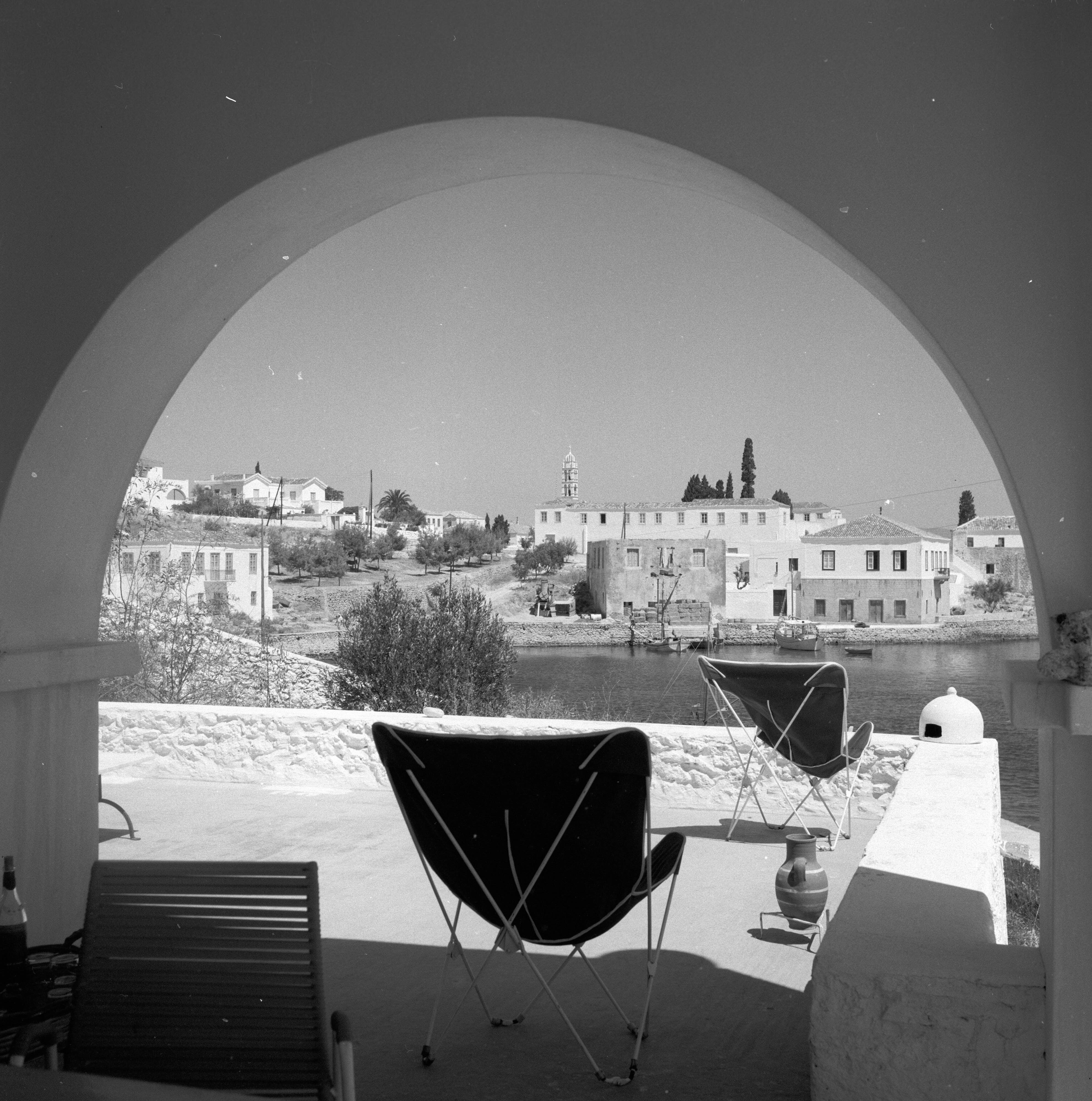
Spetses in 1963

In the 1960s and 1970s, the island attracted a number of wealthy Greek vacationers from Athens and elsewhere, who owned second villas or lived on their large yachts in the port. Some had children who became students of the Anargirios School. Although some hotels had been constructed, tourists often stayed in purpose-built holiday homes. From the 1980s, the Greek vacationers were often supplanted by north European tourists, especially from Britain, who were attracted by the low cost of a holiday.

Package tours to Spetses declined and eventually ceased during the 1990s. In the early 21st century, the island's holiday clientele is of a higher economic class and largely Greek.

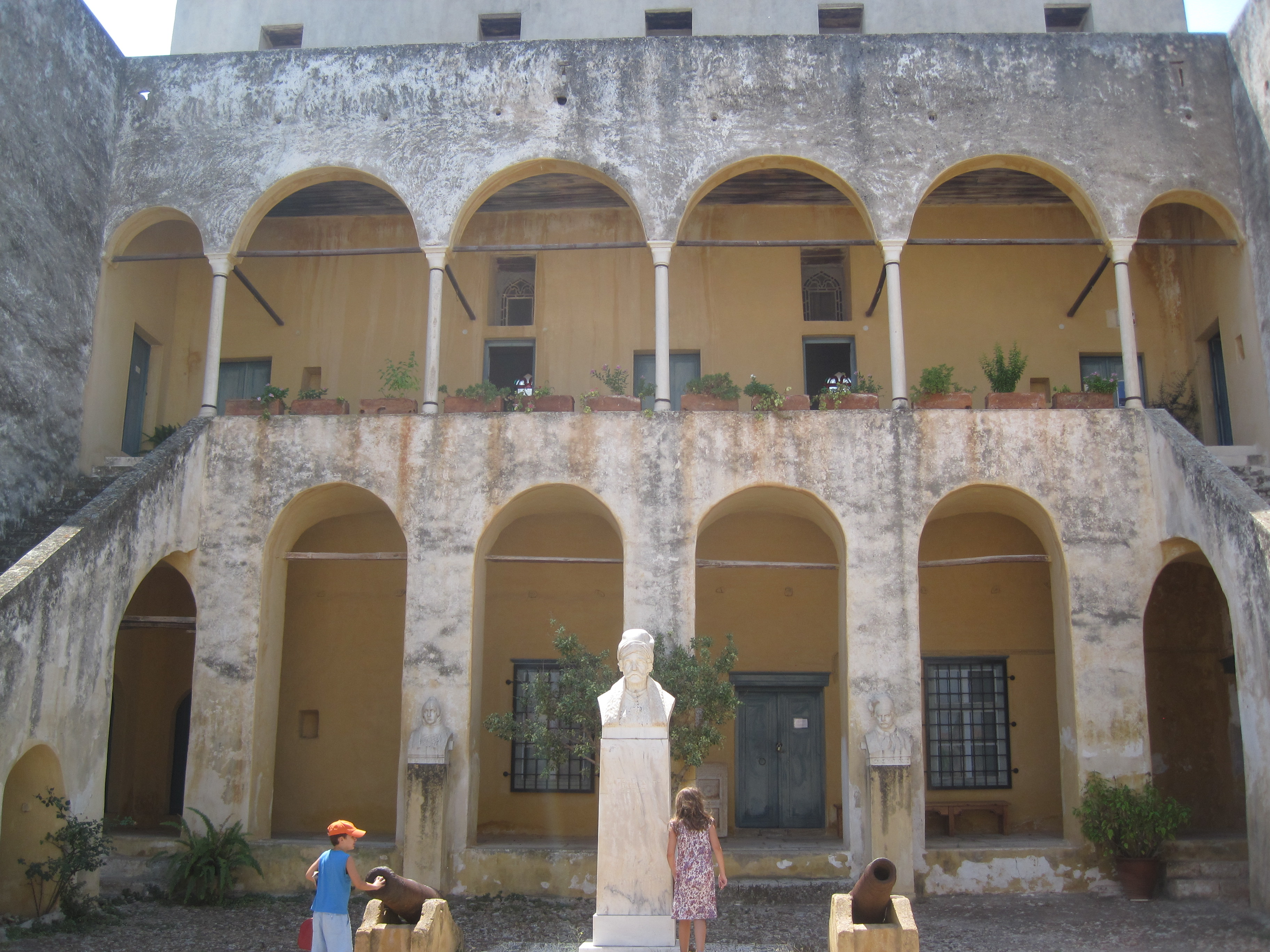
Hatzigiannis Mexis Mansion (Spetses Museum)

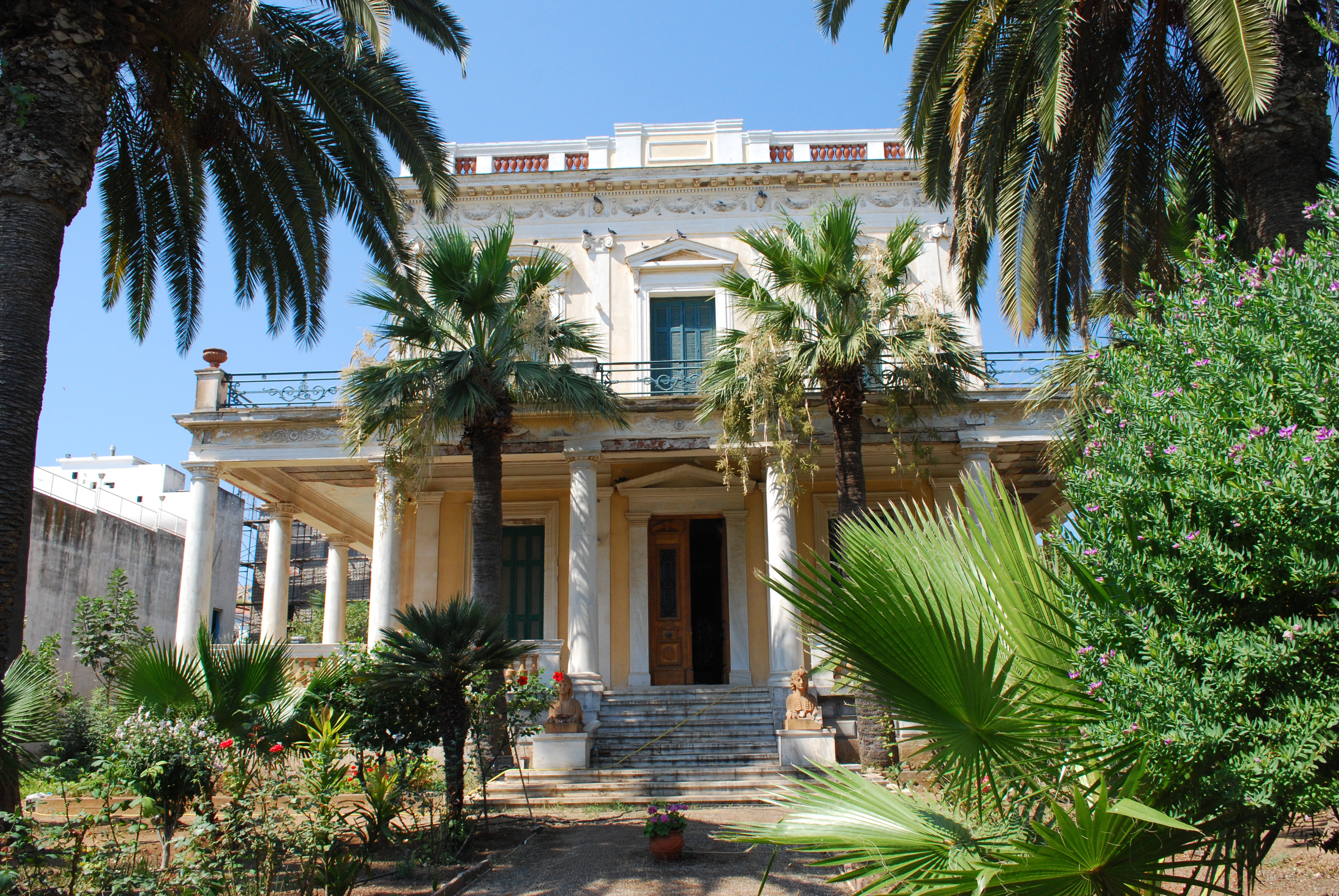
Sotirios Anargyros Mansion, Dapia Spetses

The main Athenian tourist season lasts for only two months of the year, although most hotels and restaurants are open from Easter until October. Efforts are being made by officials to extend the season, by adding major events to attract visitors:

- The Spetses Classic Yacht Regatta

In June a weekend of sailing races, starting/finishing in the strait between Spetses and Kosta. A record number of 75 yachts took part in the 2015 Regatta, which celebrated its 5th anniversary; categories were Vintage (built prior to 1947), Classic (built between 1948–1974), Spirit of Tradition (built after 1976), Traditional Caiques and Open Boats.

- The Spetses Mini Marathon

The main event is an international 26 km (16 mi) marathon around the island. A 10 km (6 mi) race was added to the program in 2014. The mini marathon has been held since 2011. Swimming races of 2.5 km (1.6 mi) and 5 km (3 mi) have been added, as well as a children’s 1000 m. Running and swimming races are also part of the three-day program. More than 2,000 men and women participate in the running events, while over 3,000 athletes in total take part in all sports. According to the Greek press, this has become the biggest annual sporting event in Greece outside of Athens.

In the early 21st century, there was a distinct shift away from package tourism on Spetses and the island once again became fashionable among wealthier Greeks. Nowadays, the majority of visitors are Greek or independent travellers from around the world. Whilst it is still possible to find traditional lower cost rooms to rent and tavernas to eat in on the island there are now many higher priced restaurants and 'boutique' hotels around the town.

== The Armáta Festival ==
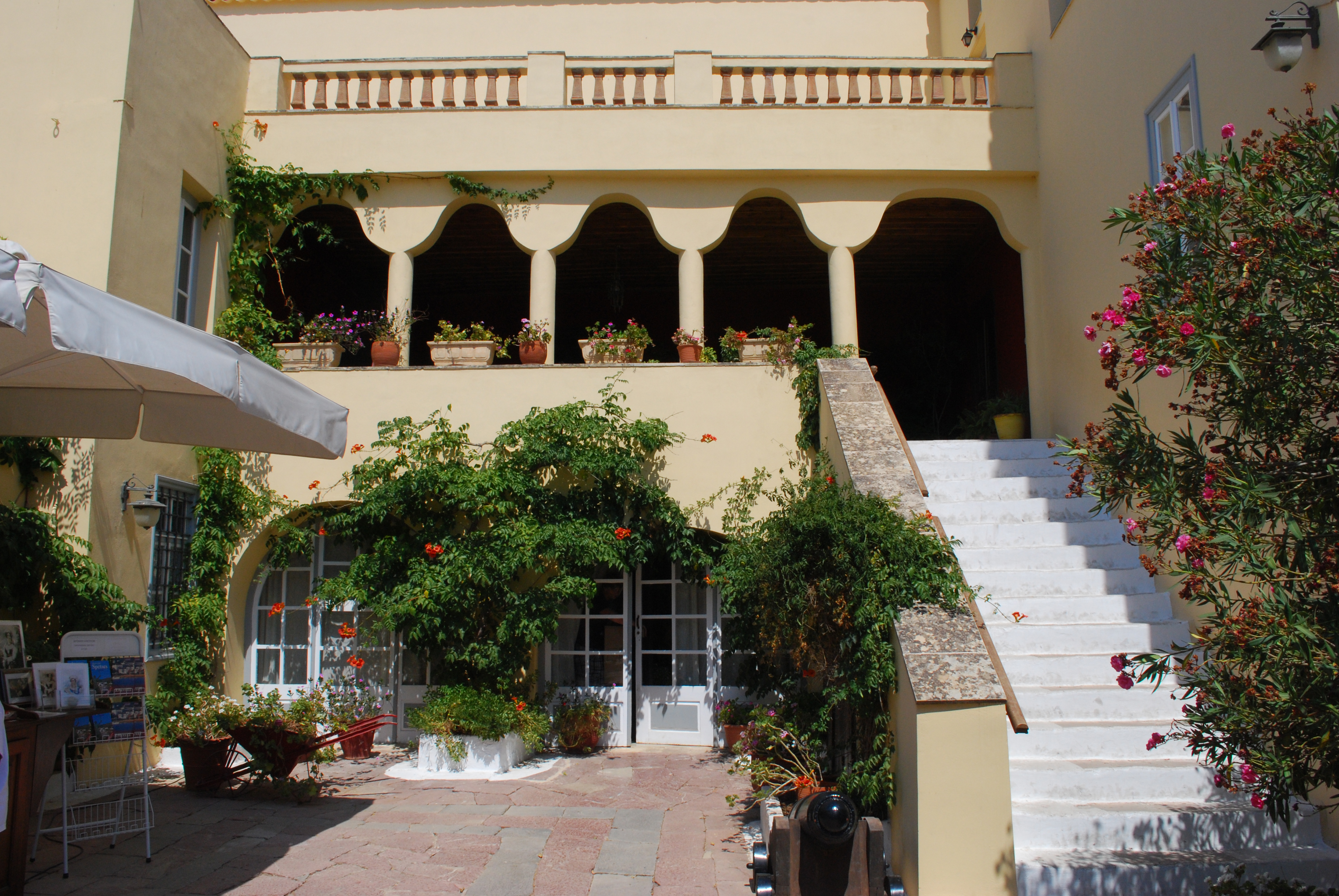
The mansion of Laskarina Bouboulina

Flag of Spetses during the Greek War of Independence. The text reads: "Freedom or Death".

On 8 September (O.S.) 1822 the Ottoman fleet, coming from Monemvasia, endeavoured to supply the town of Nafplion, which was at the time besieged by Greek forces since the spring of 1821. Sailing between Trikeri and Spetsopoula, the Turkish force confronted the combined fleets of the three nautical islands, Spetses, Hydra and Psara. The admiral of the Greek fleet, Andreas Miaoulis, gave orders to withdraw to the Gulf of Argolis, in order to outmanoeuvre the more numerous and powerful Ottoman fleet.

According to general descriptions, the battle consisted in distant and ineffectual cannonade between the two fleets. An Algerian brig was damaged by fire, having boarded by mistake a Greek fireship.

According to Spetsiot local historian Anastasios Orlandos, however, the retreat of the Ottoman fleet was the result of an attack by the fireship of Kosmas Barbatsis (1792–1887) against the Ottoman flagship. The latter fled to avoid it, followed by the other Ottoman ships. The besieged castles of Nafplion could not be relieved, and fell to the Greeks two and a half months later.

Each year, the second weekend of September is dedicated to celebratory events aimed at commemorating the events of the battle of 8 September 1822, in combination with the feast of the chapel of Panagiá Armáta (the Madonna-in-arms), near the lighthouse. The events culminate with a fictionalized re-enactment of the battle, including the torching of the Turkish flagship in the harbour, an incident not mentioned in historical depictions of the battle.

Spetses is one of nine European cities that participates in the European Network of Historical Reconstructions (Brussels, Belgium; Dublin and Cork, Ireland; Bailen, Spain; Slavkov, Czech Republic; Tewkesbury, UK; and Hydra and Spetses in Greece).

== In wider culture ==
Spetses was the basis for the island of Phraxos in John Fowles' 1965 novel The Magus. Many locations described in the book actually existed, including the "Lord Byron School" (the private Anargyrios and Korgialenios School of Spetses) and the "Villa Bourani" (located on the south side of the island above a popular public beach). Both the school and villa still exist, although the house is under private ownership. Fowles himself taught English at the school between the years 1951 and 1953.

Spetses is the setting of Richard H. White's 2013 novel Miro's Knot. The book describes real locations on Spetses in extensive detail, with a portion of the book set on Spetsopoula. As of 2024, Miro's Knot is in development to be adapted into a feature film.

Maggie Gyllenhaal's 2021 drama The Lost Daughter and Rian Johnson's 2022 mystery-comedy Glass Onion: A Knives Out Mystery were shot on Spetses.

== Demographic evolution ==
Year	Population	Municipal/Island population
1981	3,729	–
1991	3,509	3,603
2001	3,846	3,916
2011	4,001	4,027
2021	3,661	3,748

== Notable residents ==
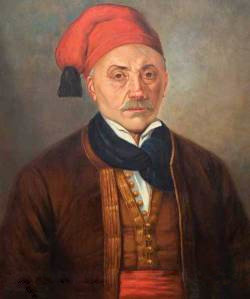
Ioannis Orlandos

- Laskarina Bouboulina (1771–1825), merchant, shipowner, and admiral
- Dimitrios Drivas, swimmer, competed in the 1896 Summer Olympics
- John Fowles (1926–2005), English novelist who taught English at a school in Spetses
- Alexander Frey, American symphony orchestra conductor of Greek origin
- Diomidis Kyriakos (1811–1869), author and Prime Minister of Greece
- Ioannis Malokinis (1880–1942), swimmer who competed in the 1896 Summer Olympics
- Hatzigiannis Mexis (1754–1844), shipowner and first Governor of Spetses
- Ioannis Orlandos (1770–1852), politician and revolutionary
- Georgios Panou (1770–1863), shipowner, revolutionary, and politician
- Iannis Xenakis (1922–2001), Romanian-born Greek-French composer
- Vasilios Lazarou (1782–1862), shipowner, revolutionary, and politician

== Gallery ==
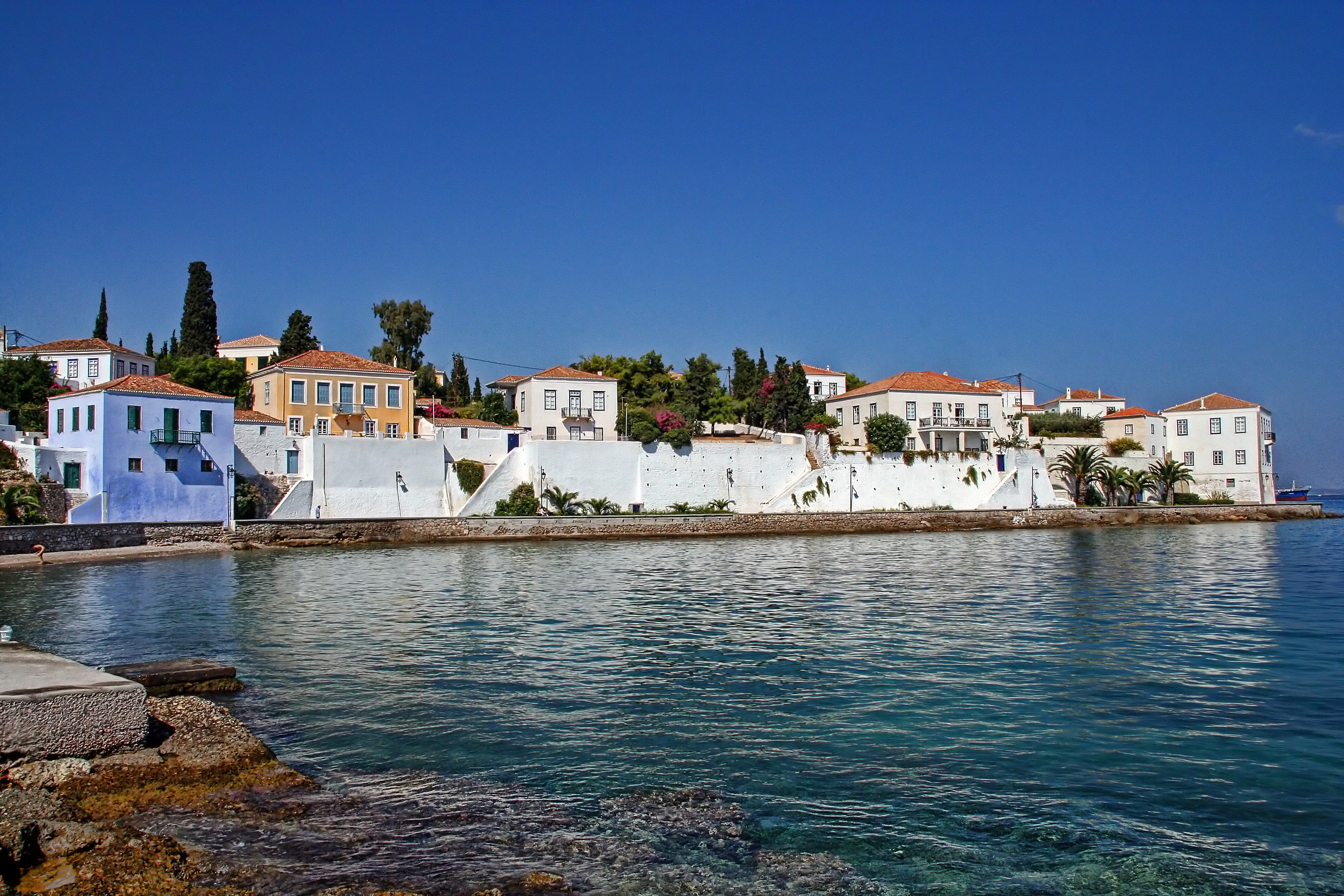
Spetses

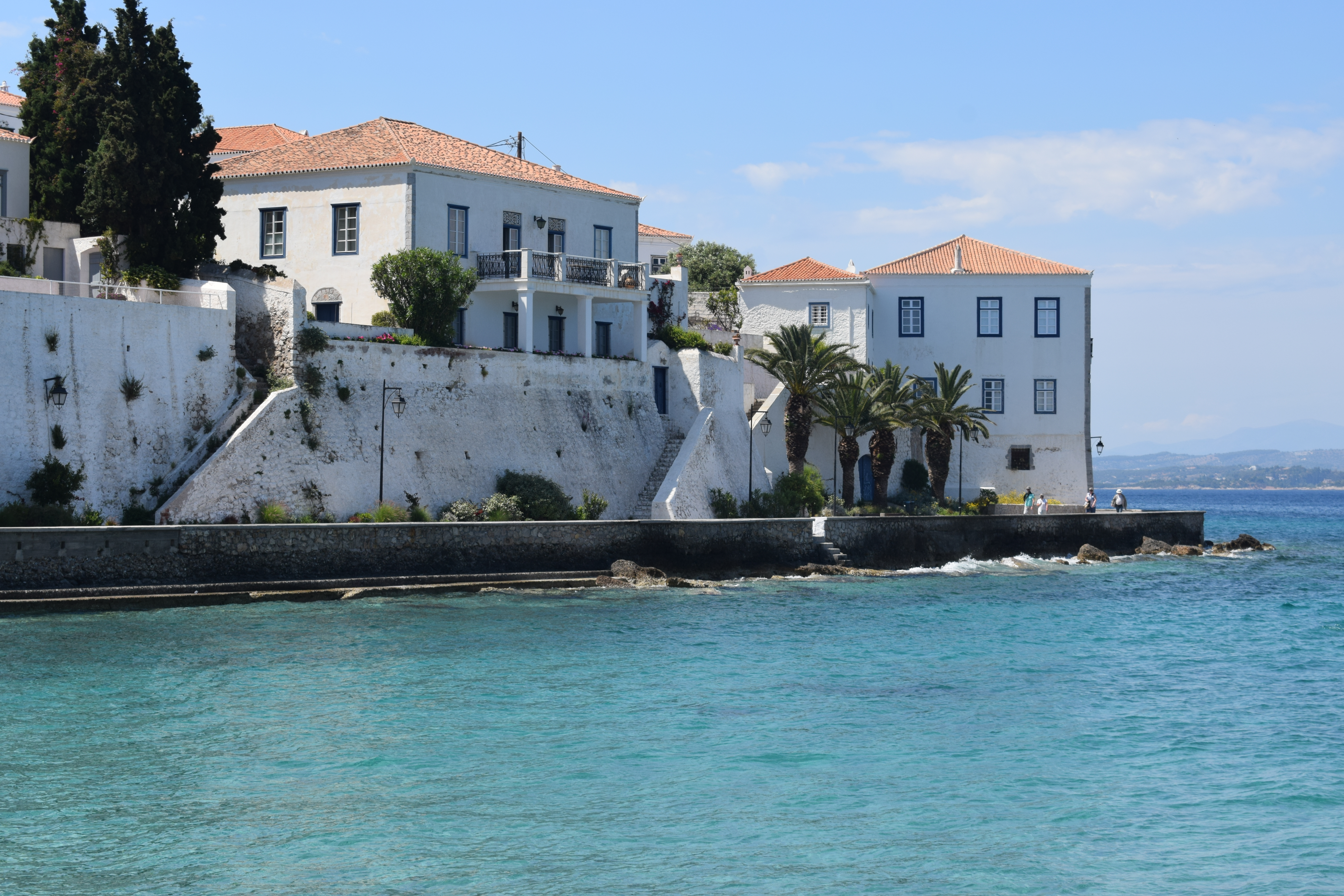
Spetses seaside street

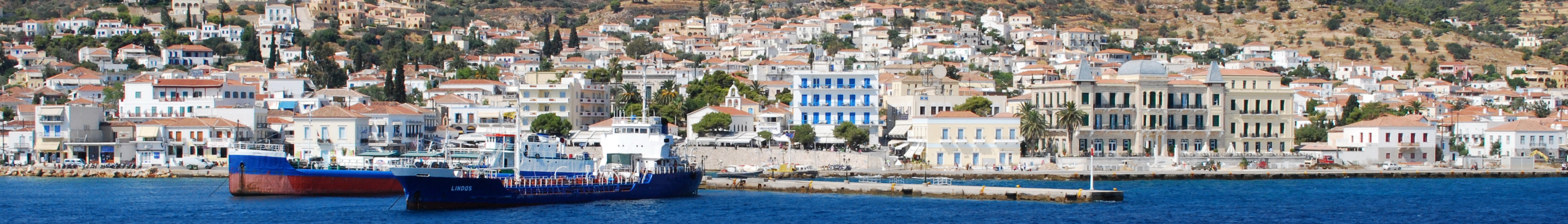
Spetses from the sea

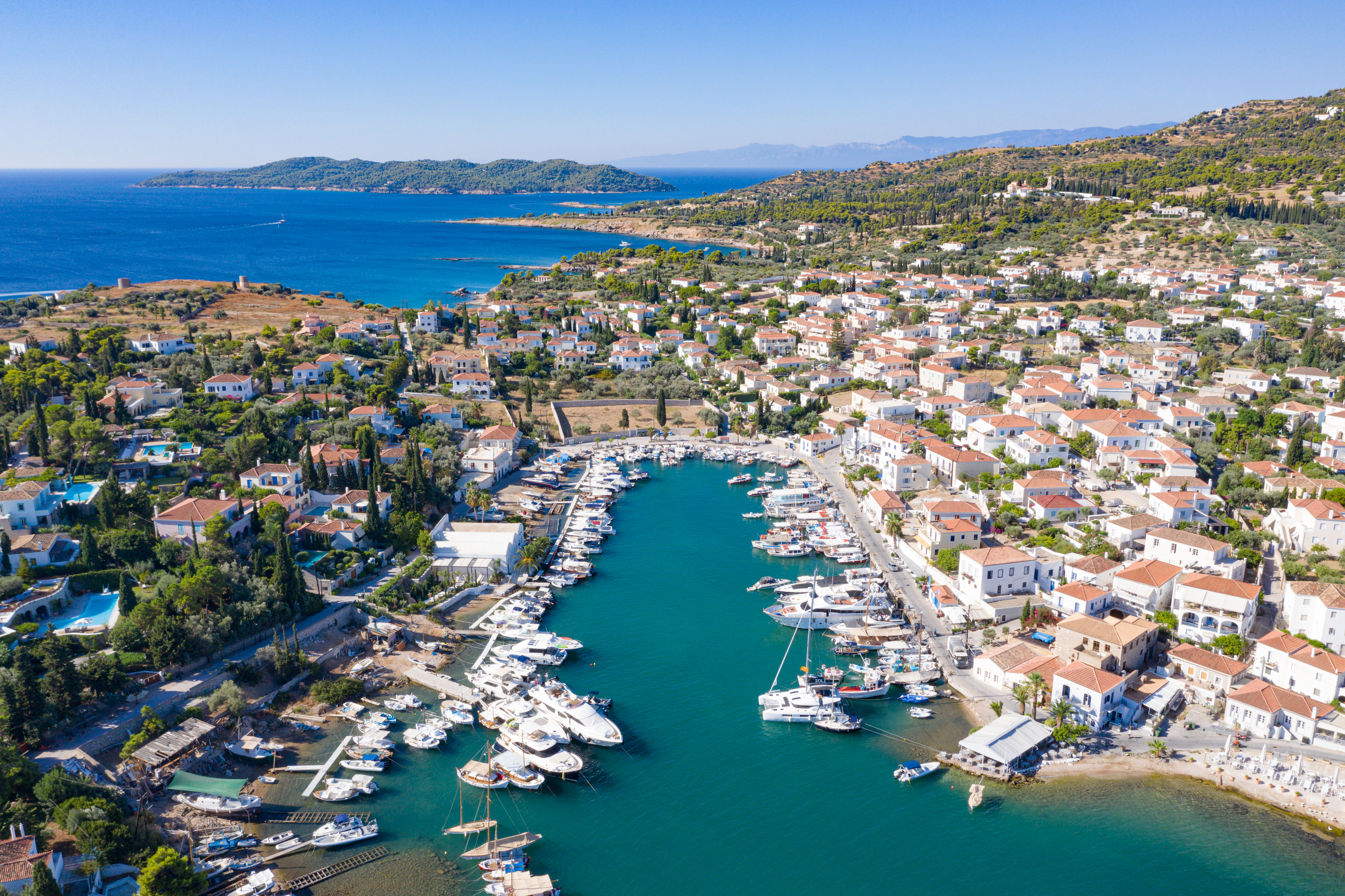
Old port on Spetses island

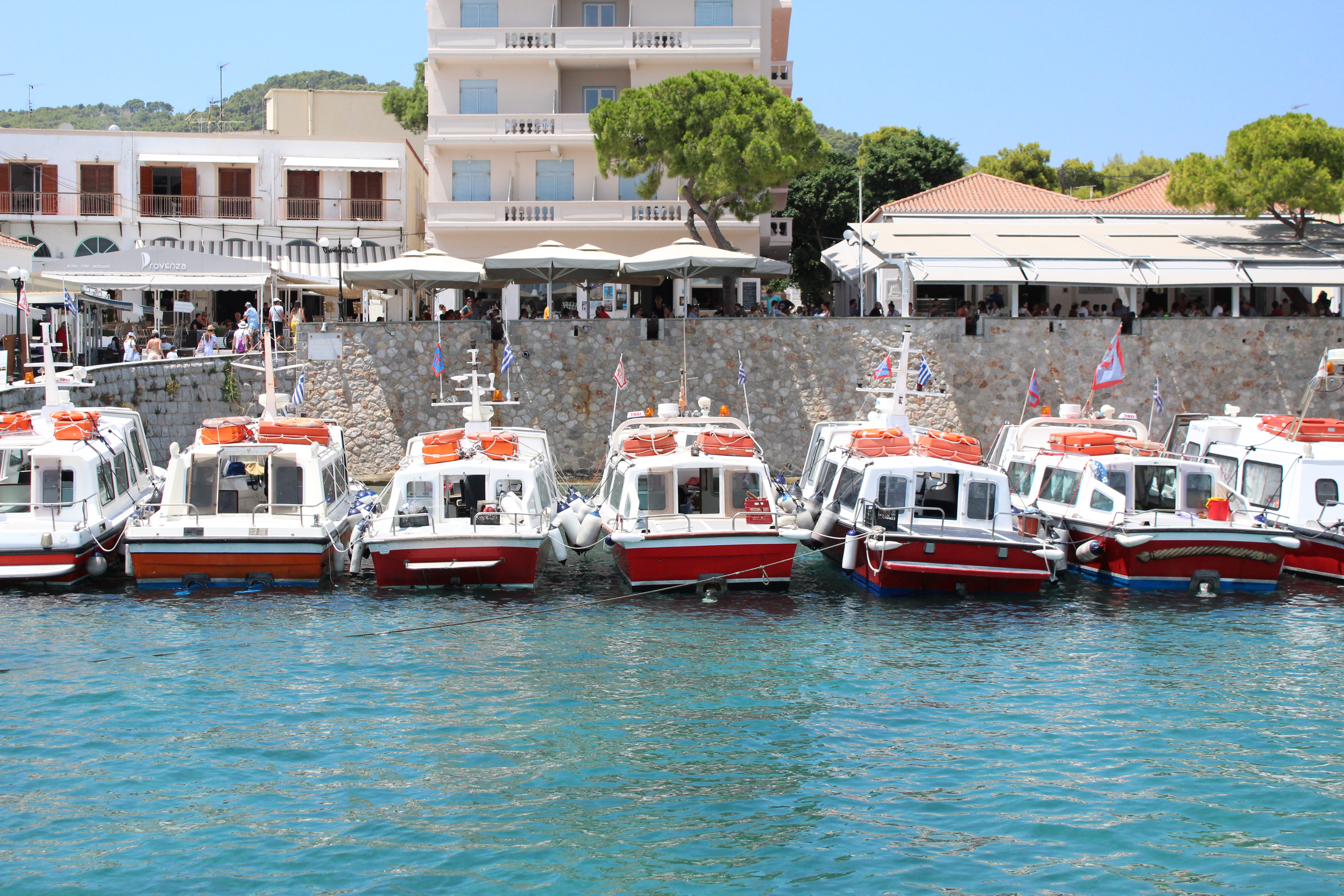
New port of Spetses, water taxis

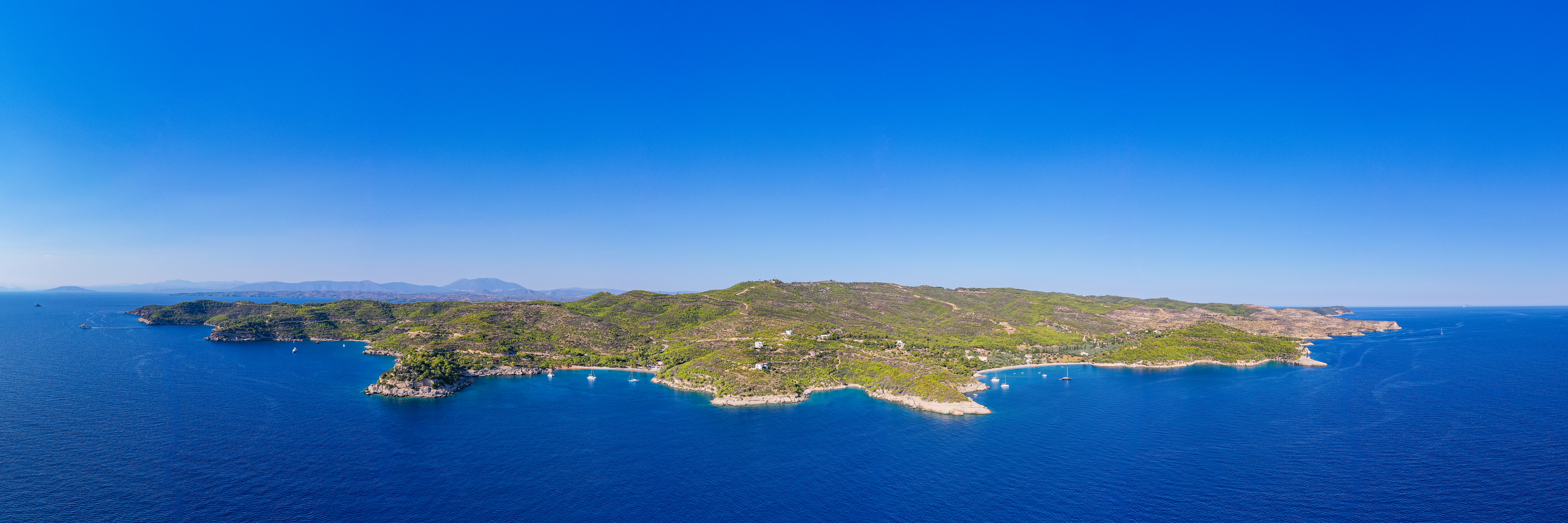
Spetses island panorama

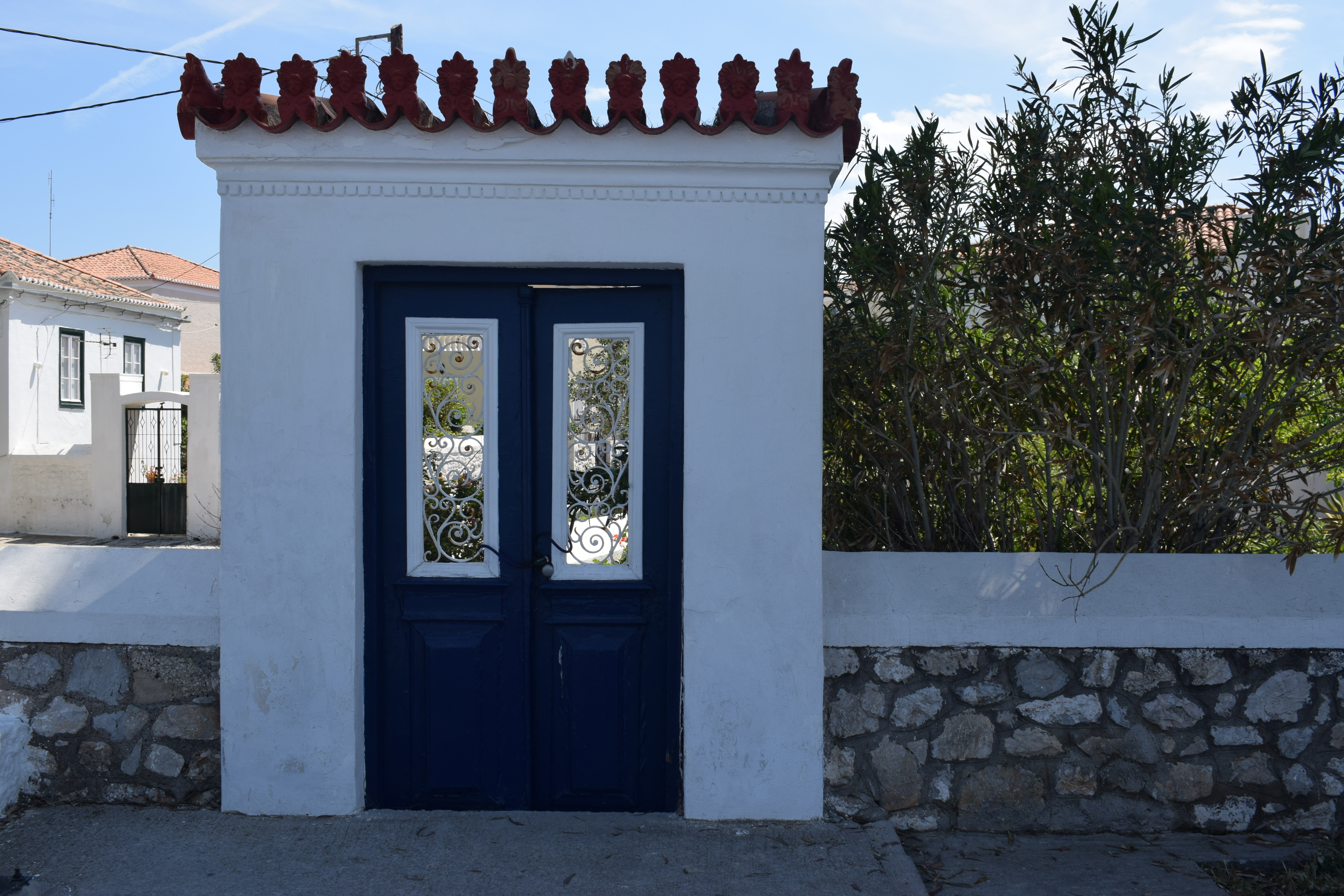
Door

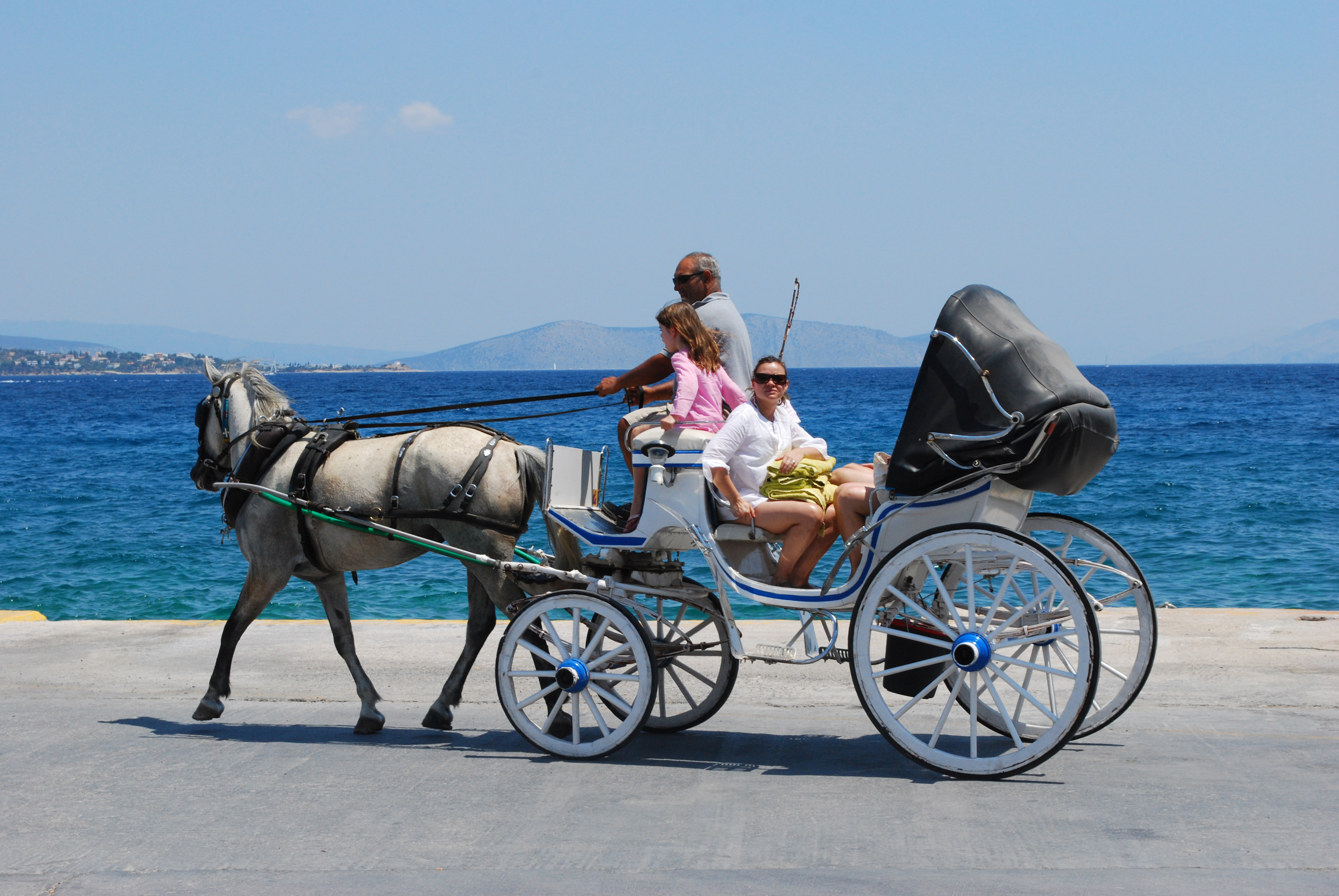
Carriage

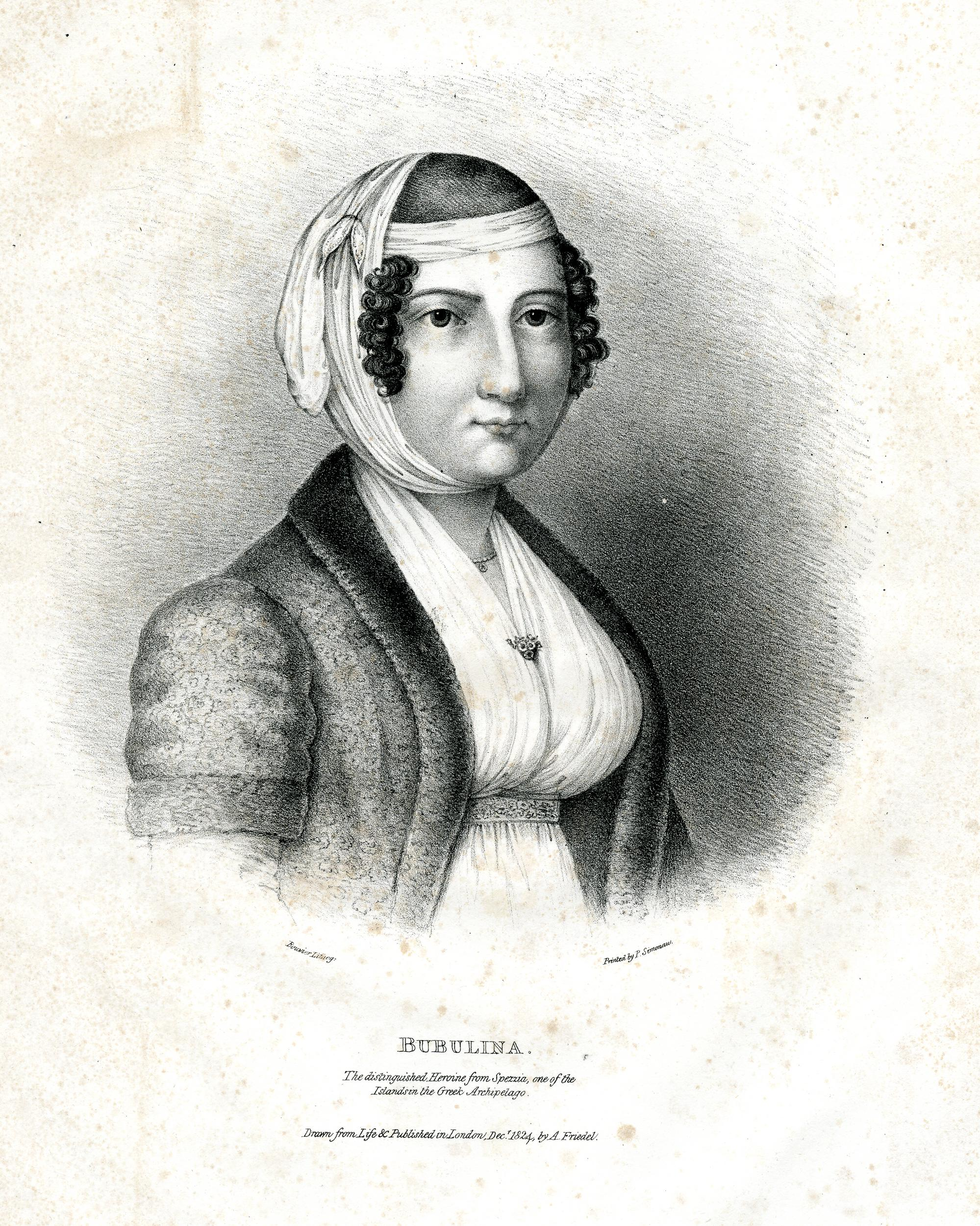
Laskarina Bouboulina

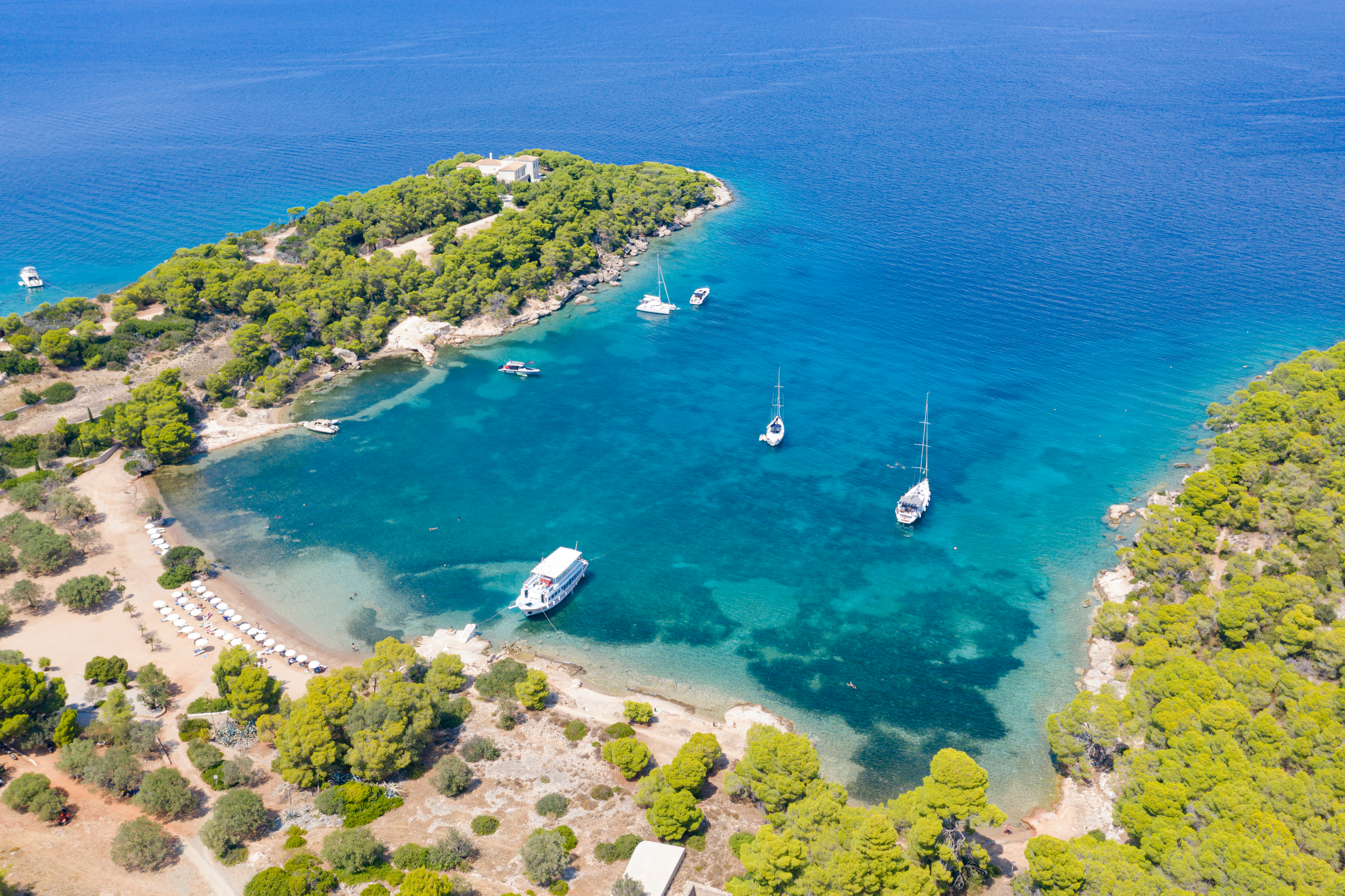
Zogeria

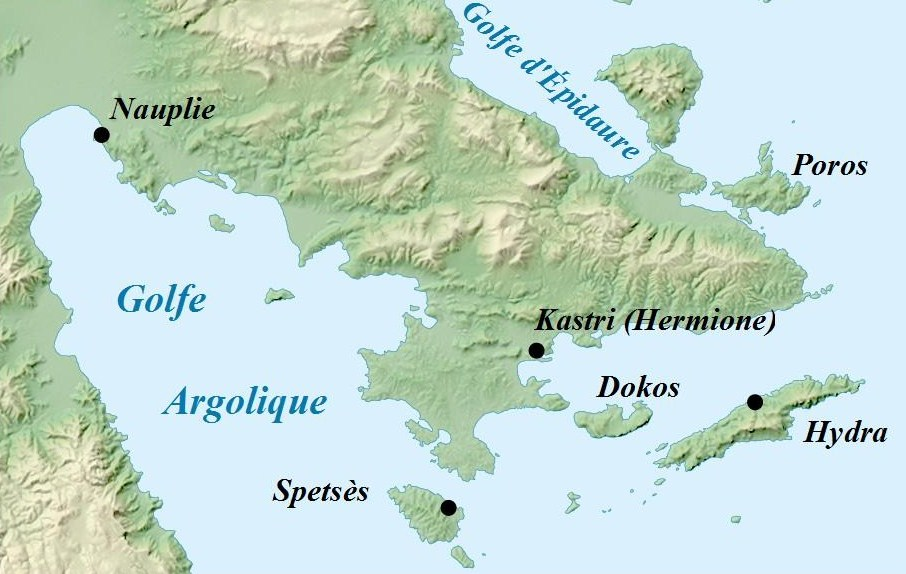
Argolic gulf and islands map

== See also ==
- List of settlements in Attica
- Fishtales – The island appears in the children's film.
- Free-diving – World record free-diving attempts frequently take place around the island.
