= Spetses Museum =

Museum in Spetses, Greece

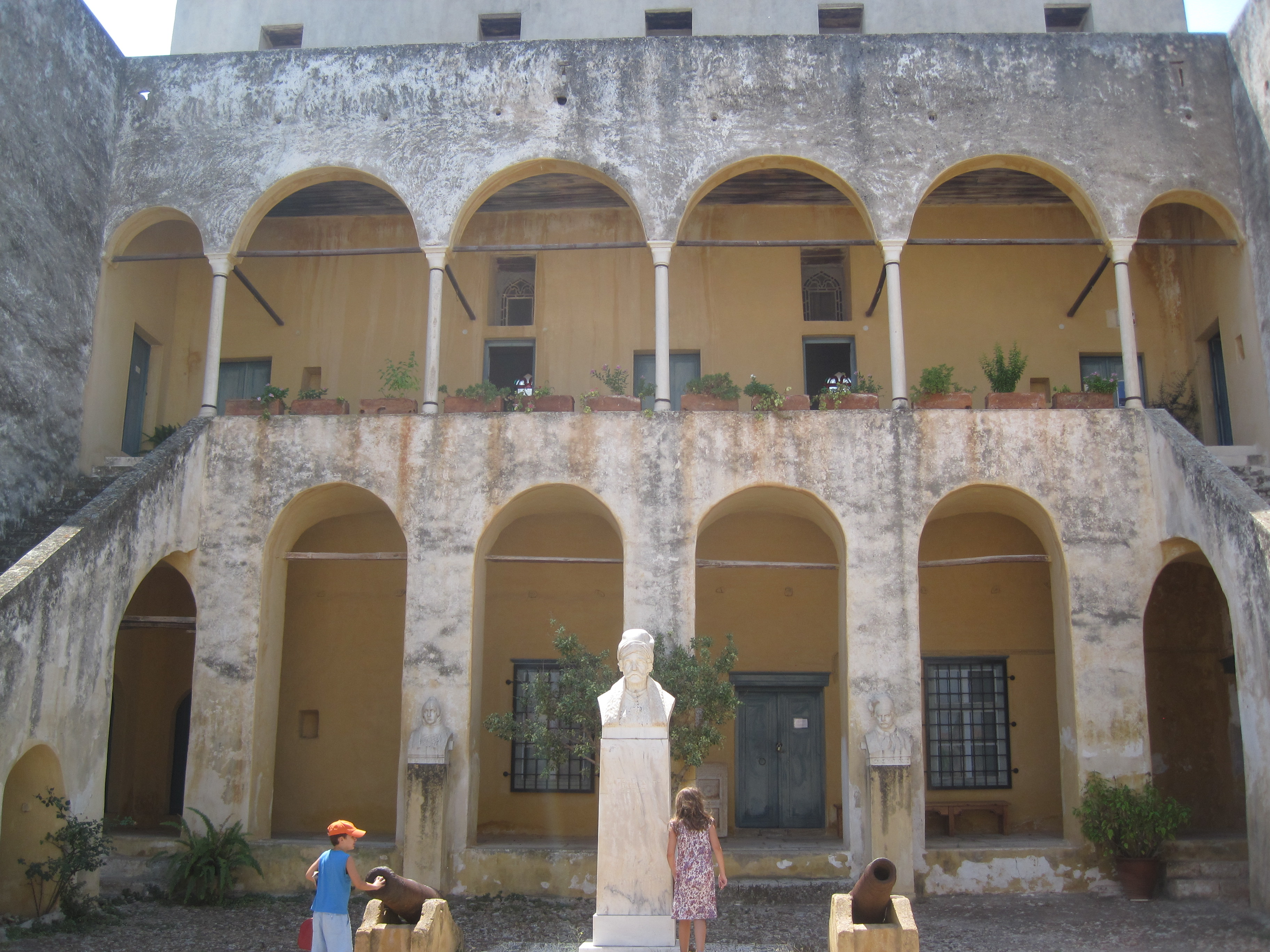
- Location: Spetses, Spetses Municipality, Greece
- Website: Official website

The Spetses Museum is a diachronic museum in Spetses, Greece. Its exhibits cover 4000 years of the island's cultural history. It is housed in the mansion of Chatzigiannis-Mexis, which was built in 1798. The first floor is open to the public.
