= Spetses mini Marathon =

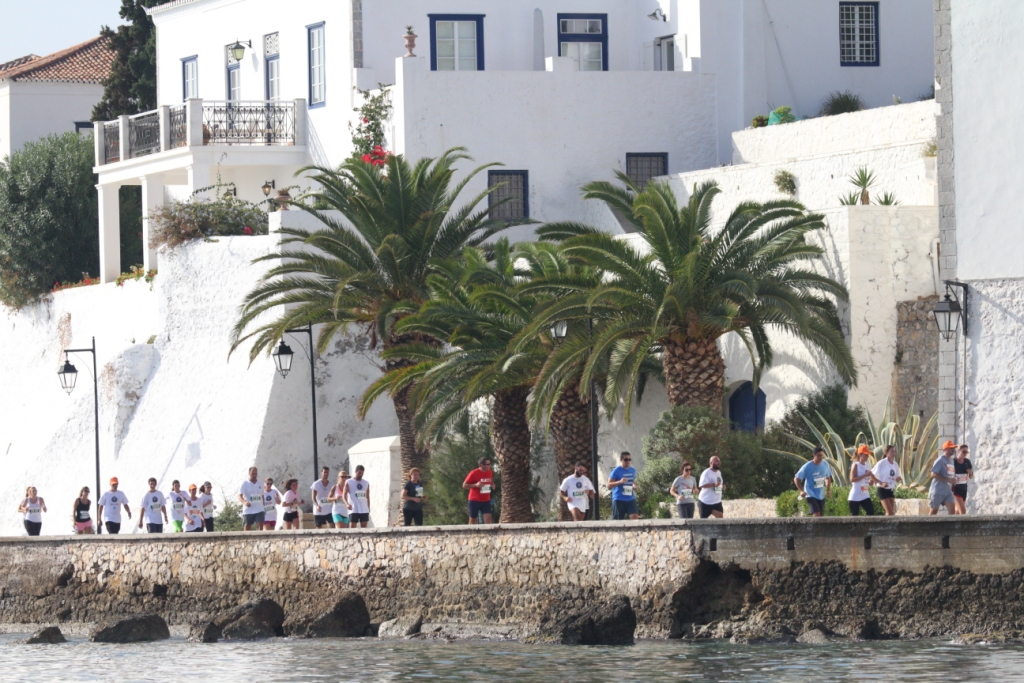
Athletes running across the Old Harbor (Palio Limani).

The Spetses mini Marathon is an international sporting event held annually over three days on the island of Spetses, Greece. The event includes three foot races of 5, 10, and 25 km, and three open-water swimming races of 1.5 km, 3 km, and 5 km, as well as events for children.

The event has been held every October since 2011, drawing over 5,000 competitors across the three days of races. The mini Marathon is open to all, regardless of amateur status, so long as participants are at least 18 years old and able to pay the registration fee. In addition to the running and swimming events for adults, there are several children's events: a 500 and 1,000 m run, and a 150 and 300 m swim, as well as a 500 m run for children aged 5 and younger (called "My 1st Spetses mini Marathon"). The schedule of events has grown and changed somewhat from the first mini Marathon in 2011. Initially, the long-distance race covered 26 km, but in 2013 this was shortened to 25 km. In 2012, swimming competitions and children's races were introduced. By 2013, the swimming competition had more than 600 competitors, making it the largest open-water swimming competition in Europe. Attendance has increased rapidly, from 10,000 spectators and competitors in 2014, to more than 14,000 coming from 42 different countries in 2018.

Since its creation, the event has won a number of awards, including the "Ruban d'Honneur" from the European Business Awards committee in 2015, as well as being honored in the Sports Tourism category of the 2014 Greek Tourism Awards. The island and its residents play a major role in the Spetses mini Marathon. The event is organized by Athens-based Communication Lab, with support from the municipality of Spetses, the Greek National Tourism Organisation (GNTO), and hundreds of local volunteers. The course of the various races involves much of Spetses and its maritime position — the 25 km run covers the island, while the shorter routes run through the historic center and the Old Harbor. The 3 and 5 km swimming routes cross (once and twice, respectively) the strait separating Spetses from the town of Kosta on the mainland, while the 1.5 km swim starts in front of the Poseidonion Grand Hotel.

== Winners ==
Year	Winner	Time
	25 km Course (Men)	
2019	Pitsolis Charalampos	01:31:12
2018	Efstratiou Ioannis	01:38:41
2017	Merousis Christoforos	01:27:11
2016	Merousis Christoforos	01:26:15
2015	Skoularikis Giorgos	01:36:49
2014	Valavanis Giorgos	01:39:21
2013	Theodorakakos Dimitris	01:28:00
2012	Papadopoulos Yiannis	01:13:33
2011	Papadopoulos Yiannis	01:31:12

Year	Winner	Time
	5 km Course (Men)	
2019	Kalakos Thanos	00:14:27
2018	Roukliotis Georgios	00:15:13
2017	Dimopoulos Panagiotis	00:15:01
2016	Roukliotis Georgios	00:15:23
2015	Nakopoulos Costas	00:14:39
2014	Nakopoulos Costas	00:13:57
2013	Nakopoulos Costas	00:14:33
2012	Nakopoulos Costas	00:14:53
2011	Nakopoulos Costas	00:16:02

Year	Winner	Time
	10 km Course (Men)	
2019	Kokalas Giorgos	00:34:44
2018	Tsikouras Nikos	00:33:41
2017		
2016	Dimitriadis Nikos	00:35:59
2015	Drossos Konstantinos	00:34:16
2014	Poulios Constantinos	00:32:26

== Sources ==
- Dr. Marina Lyda Coutarelli, "The Spetses mini Marathon Phenomenon", Visitgreece.gr The Blog, Athens 2014.
- Marissa Churchill, Pastry Chef and Author, "Exploring the Peloponnese", Huffingtonpost.com The Blog, U.S.A. 2014.
