= Otto of Greece =

King of Greece from 1832 to 1862

Otto
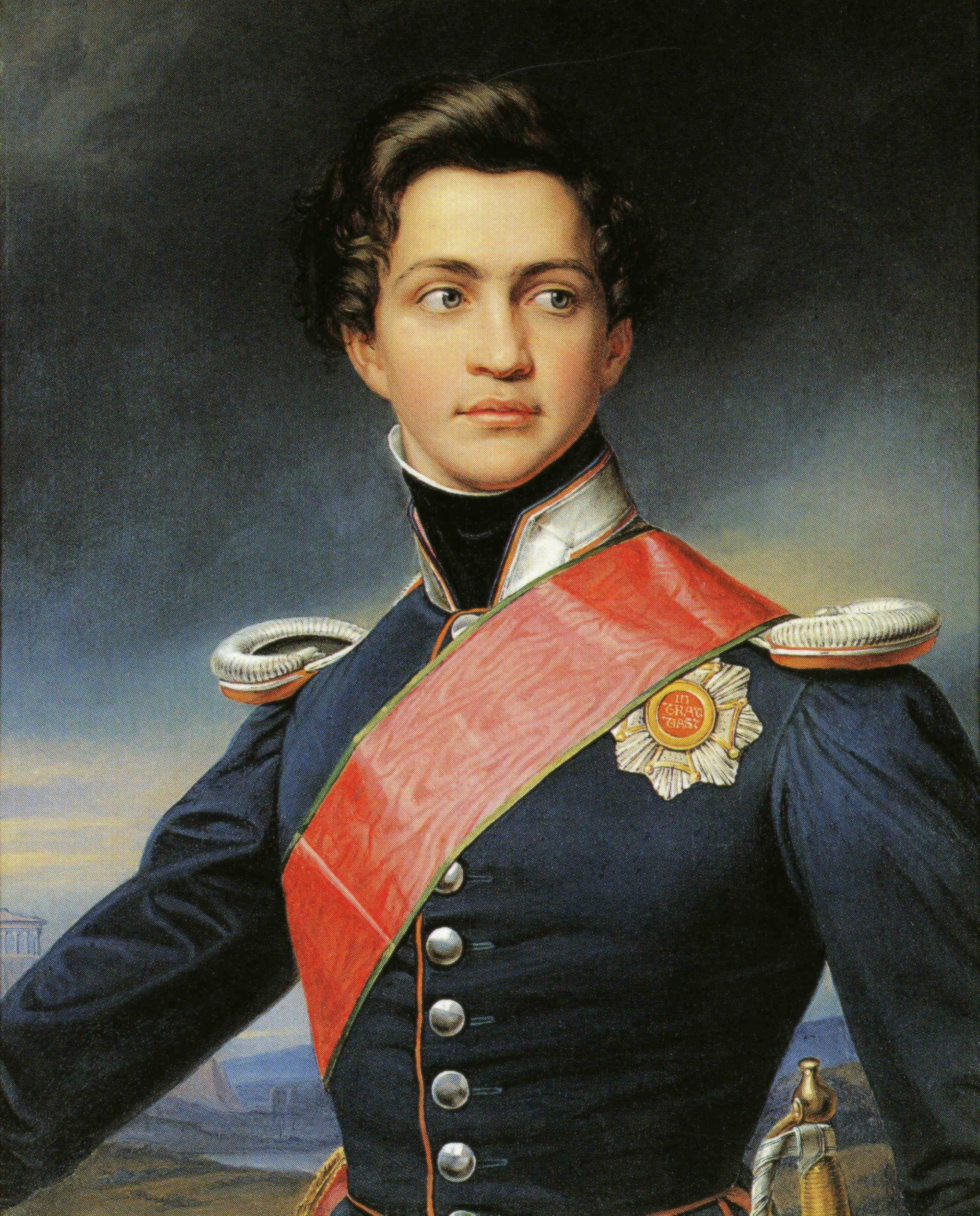
- Portrait by Joseph Karl Stieler, 1833

King of Greece
- Reign: 7 May 1832 – 23 October 1862
- Enthronement: 1 June 1835
- Predecessor: Monarchy established Georgios Kountouriotis (as President of the Administrative Committee of Greece (1832))
- Successor: George I (as King of the Hellenes)
- Regent: Josef Ludwig von Armansperg (1833–1835)
- Prime Ministers: See list: Spyridon Trikoupis; Alexandros Mavrokordatos; Ioannis Kolettis; Josef Ludwig von Armansperg; Ignaz von Rudhart; Andreas Metaxas; Konstantinos Kanaris; Kitsos Tzavelas; Georgios Kountouriotis; Athanasios Miaoulis; Gennaios Kolokotronis

Head of Government of Greece
- In office 10 August 1841 – 3 September 1843 (o.s.)
- Monarch: Himself
- Preceded by: Alexandros Mavrokordatos (as Prime Minister)
- Succeeded by: Andreas Metaxas (as Prime Minister)
- In office 8 December 1837 – 24 June 1841 (o.s.)
- Monarch: Himself
- Preceded by: Ignaz von Rudhart (as Prime Minister)
- Succeeded by: Alexandros Mavrokordatos (as Prime Minister)
- Born: Prince Otto Friedrich Ludwig of Bavaria; 1 June 1815; Salzburg, Austrian Empire
- Died: 26 July 1867 (aged 52); Bamberg, Kingdom of Bavaria
- Burial: Theatinerkirche, Munich
- Spouse: Amalia of Oldenburg (m. 1836)
- House: Wittelsbach
- Father: Ludwig I of Bavaria
- Mother: Therese of Saxe-Hildburghausen
- Religion: Catholicism

Styles of Otto I of Greece
- Reference style: His Majesty
- Spoken style: Your Majesty

Otto (Greek: Όθων, romanized: Óthon; German: Otto Friedrich Ludwig von Wittelsbach; 1 June 1815 – 26 July 1867) was King of Greece from the establishment of the Kingdom on 7 May 1832, under the Convention of London, until he was deposed in October 1862.

The second son of King Ludwig I of Bavaria, Otto ascended the newly created throne of Greece at age 17. His government was initially run by a three-man regency council made up of Bavarian court officials. Upon reaching his majority, Otto removed the regents when they proved unpopular with the people, and he ruled as an absolute monarch. Eventually, his subjects' demands for a constitution proved overwhelming, and in the face of an armed (but bloodless) insurrection, Otto granted a constitution in 1843.

Throughout his reign, Otto tried to make significant reforms to modernize Greece, seeing himself as an Enlightened absolutist. He established educational institutions and several state services but was unable to resolve Greece's major poverty and prevent economic meddling from outside. Greek politics in this era were based on affiliations with the three Great Powers that had guaranteed Greece's independence, Britain, France and Russia, and Otto's ability to maintain the support of these powers was key to his remaining in power. To remain strong, Otto had to play the interests of each of the Great Powers' Greek adherents against the others, while not irritating the Great Powers. When Greece was blockaded by the British Royal Navy in 1850 and again in 1854, to stop Greece from attacking the Ottoman Empire during the Crimean War, Otto's standing amongst Greeks suffered. As a result, there was an assassination attempt on Queen Amalia, and finally, in October 1862, Otto was deposed while in the countryside. He died in exile in Bavaria in 1867.

== Early life and accession ==
Otto was born as Prince Otto Friedrich Ludwig of Bavaria at Schloss Mirabell in Salzburg (when it briefly belonged to the Kingdom of Bavaria), as the second son of Crown Prince Ludwig of Bavaria and Therese of Saxe-Hildburghausen. His father served there as the Bavarian governor-general and was a prominent Philhellene, who provided significant financial aid to the Greek cause during the War of Independence.

Through his ancestor, the Bavarian Duke John II, Otto was a descendant of the Byzantine imperial dynasties of Komnenos and Laskaris.

Otto was a child of delicate health and temperament, with a slight stutter and a passion for the piano. As a teenager, he was tutored in Classical Greek and Latin by classical scholar and passionate Philhellene Friedrich Thiersch, who was the first to suggest the young prince as a candidate for the throne of the emerging nation. Thiersch's suggestion was supported by Jean-Gabriel Eynard, a major financial benefactor of the Greek independence movement and friend of Ioannis Kapodistrias, Greece's governor. Otto's name therefore entered the discourse surrounding Greek independence, both within Greece and abroad.

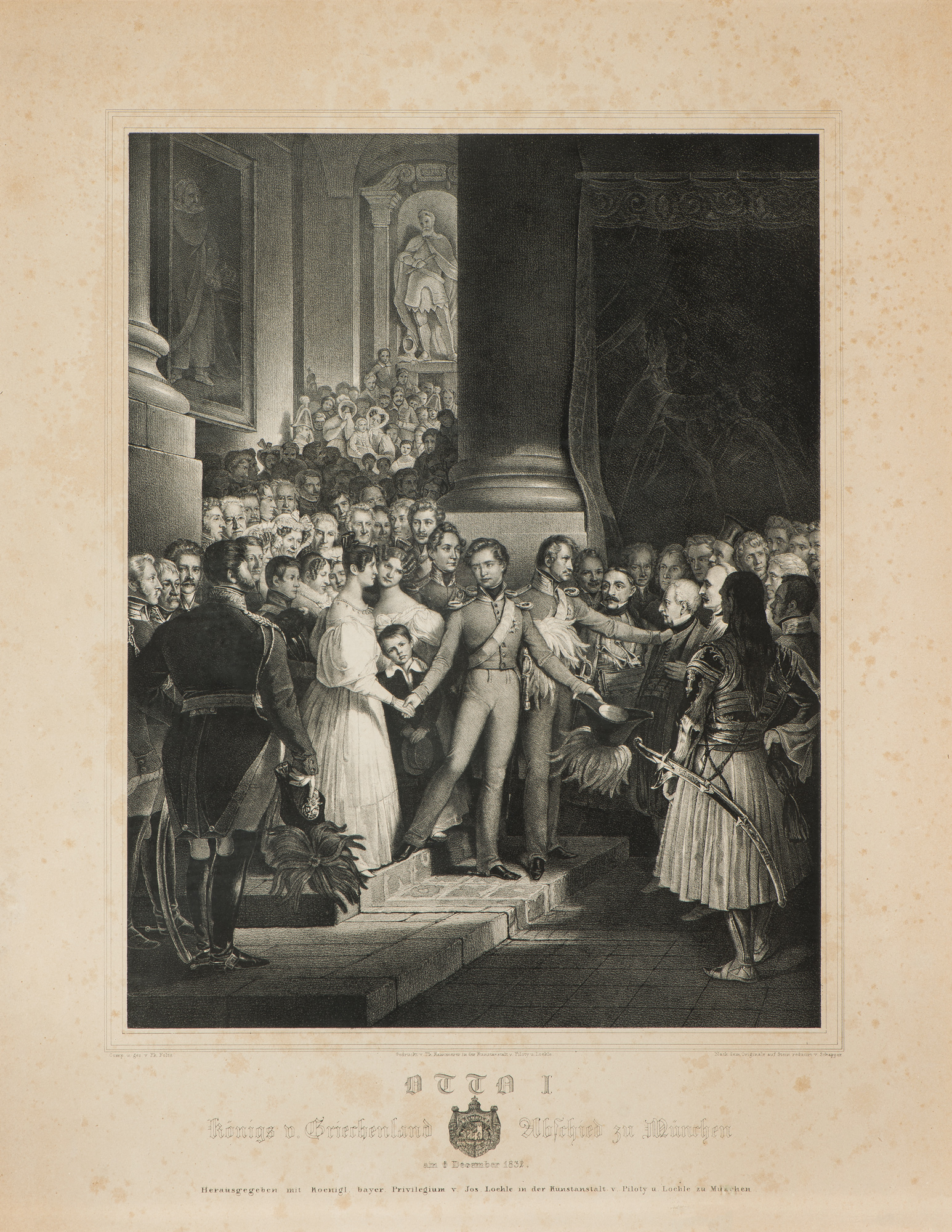
King Otto's Farewell to the Bavarian royal court

At the end of Greek War of Independence, the three Great Powers formulated the London Protocol of 1829, which recognized an autonomous Greek state. Article 3 of the protocol stated that Greece would be a monarchy, under the rule of a prince who was not from the ruling families of one of the three Great Powers. Numerous candidates were considered for the vacant throne, including Prince Frederick of the Netherlands and Otto's uncle, Prince Karl Theodor of Bavaria. Even an Irishman named Nicholas Macdonald Sarsfield Cod'd put himself forward, claiming descent from the Byzantine Palaiologos dynasty. Ultimately, they settled on Prince Leopold of Saxe-Coburg and Gotha, and the amended London Protocol of 1830 recognized him as the de jure sovereign of Greece. Although initially enthusiastic, Leopold was discouraged by the limited borders established by the protocol and Britain's refusal to grant financial support to the vulnerable new state. Due to this, as well as personal reasons, he formally rejected the crown three months later. Kapodistrias' assassination in 1831 destabilized Greece, and caused British Foreign Secretary Lord Palmerston to convene the London conference. Here, the crown was offered to the 17-year-old Prince Otto, which he happily accepted. The Bavarian House of Wittelsbach had no connections to the ruling dynasties of any of the Great Powers, and so was a neutral choice with which they were all satisfied. The Greeks were not consulted, but Greece was in chaos and no group or individual could claim to represent it anyway. The London Protocol of 1832 therefore finally recognized Greece as a fully independent state, with Otto as its king.

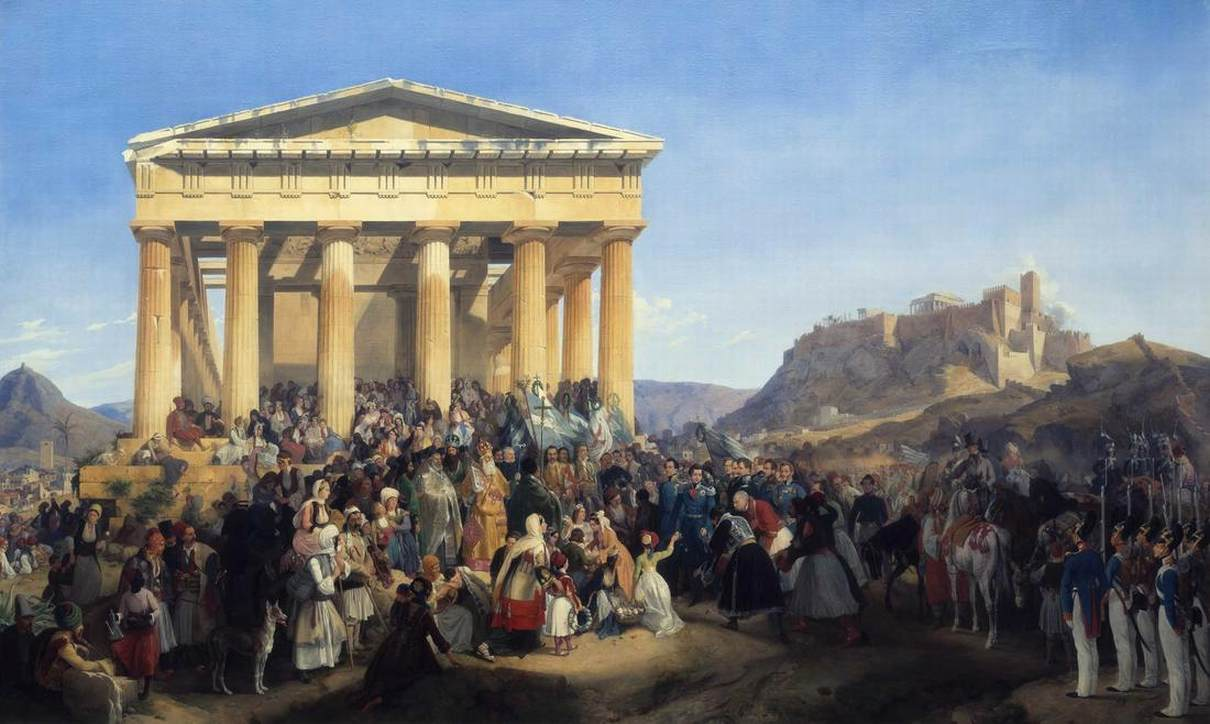
The Entry of King Otto of Greece into Athens by Peter von Hess, 1839

The Great Powers extracted a pledge from Otto's father to restrain him from hostile actions against the Ottoman Empire. They also insisted that Otto's title would be "King of Greece", rather than "King of the Hellenes", because the latter would imply a claim over the millions of Greeks then still under Turkish rule. Not quite 18, the young prince arrived in Greece with 3,500 Bavarian troops (the Bavarian Auxiliary Corps) and three Bavarian advisors aboard the British frigate HMS Madagascar. Although he did not speak Greek, he immediately endeared himself to his adopted country by adopting the Greek national costume and Hellenizing his name to "Othon" (some English sources, such as Encyclopædia Britannica, call him "Otho"). Thousands lined the docks of Nafplio to witness his arrival, including many heroes of the revolution such as Theodoros Kolokotronis and Alexandros Mavrokordatos. His arrival was initially enthusiastically welcomed by the Greek people as an end to the chaos of the prior years and the beginning of the rejuvenation of the Greek nation. A year later Greek poet Panagiotis Soutsos evoked the scene in Leander, the first novel to be published in independent Greece:

O King of Greece! Old Greece bequeathed the lights of learning to Germany, through you Germany has undertaken to repay the gift with interest, and will be grateful to you, seeing in you the one to resurrect the firstborn people of the Earth.

== Early reign ==
Otto's reign is usually divided into three periods:

- The years of Regency Council: 1832–1835
- The years of absolute monarchy: 1835–1843
- The years of constitutional monarchy: 1843–1862

The Bavarian advisors were arrayed in a Regency Council, headed by Count Josef Ludwig von Armansperg, who, in Bavaria as minister of finance, had recently succeeded in restoring Bavarian credit, at the cost of his popularity. Von Armansperg was the President of the Privy Council and the first representative (or Prime Minister) of the new Greek government. The other members of the Regency Council were Karl von Abel and Georg Ludwig von Maurer, with whom von Armansperg often clashed. After the king reached his majority in 1835, von Armansperg was made Arch-Secretary, but was called Arch-Chancellor by the Greek press.

Map showing the original territory of the Kingdom of Greece, as laid down in the treaty of 1832 (in dark blue)

Britain and the Rothschild bank, who were underwriting the Greek loans, insisted on financial stringency from Armansperg. The Greeks were soon more heavily taxed than under Ottoman rule; as the people saw it, they had exchanged a hated Ottoman rule for government by a foreign bureaucracy, the "Bavarocracy" (Βαυαροκρατία).

In addition, the regency showed little respect for local customs. As a Catholic, Otto himself was viewed as a heretic by many pious Greeks; however, his heirs would have to be Orthodox, according to the terms of the 1843 Constitution.

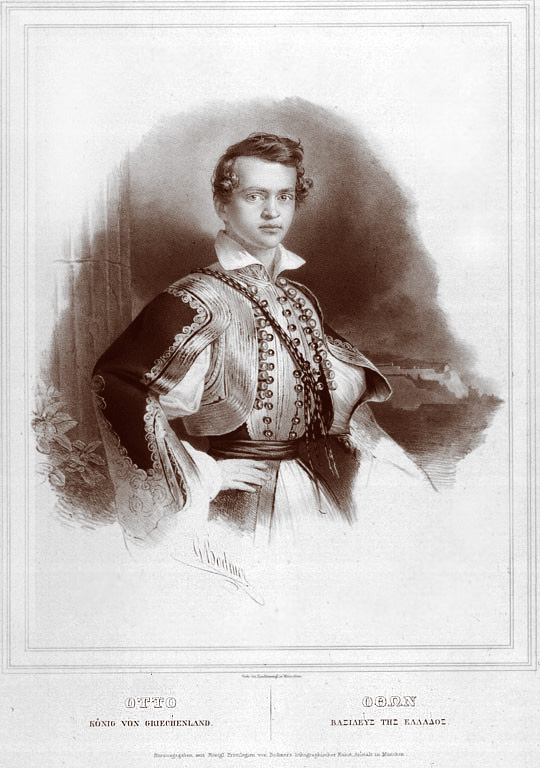
A portrait by Gottlieb Bodmer

King Otto brought his personal brewmaster with him, Herr Fuchs, a Bavarian who stayed in Greece after Otto's departure and introduced Greece to beer, under the label "Fix".

Popular heroes and leaders of the Greek Revolution, such as generals Theodoros Kolokotronis and Yannis Makriyannis, who opposed the Bavarian-dominated regency, were charged with treason, put in jail and sentenced to death. They were later pardoned under popular pressure, while Greek judges who resisted Bavarian pressure and refused to sign the death warrants (Anastasios Polyzoidis and Georgios Tertsetis, for instance), were praised as heroes.

Otto's early reign was also notable for his moving the capital of Greece from Nafplio to Athens. His first task as king was to make a detailed archaeological and topographic survey of Athens. He assigned Gustav Eduard Schaubert and Stamatios Kleanthis to complete this task. Athens was chosen as the Greek capital for historical and sentimental reasons, not because it was a large city. At that time, Athens was a small town of roughly 4,000–5,000 people in a loose swarm of houses at the foot of the Acropolis, an area located in the present-day district of Plaka.

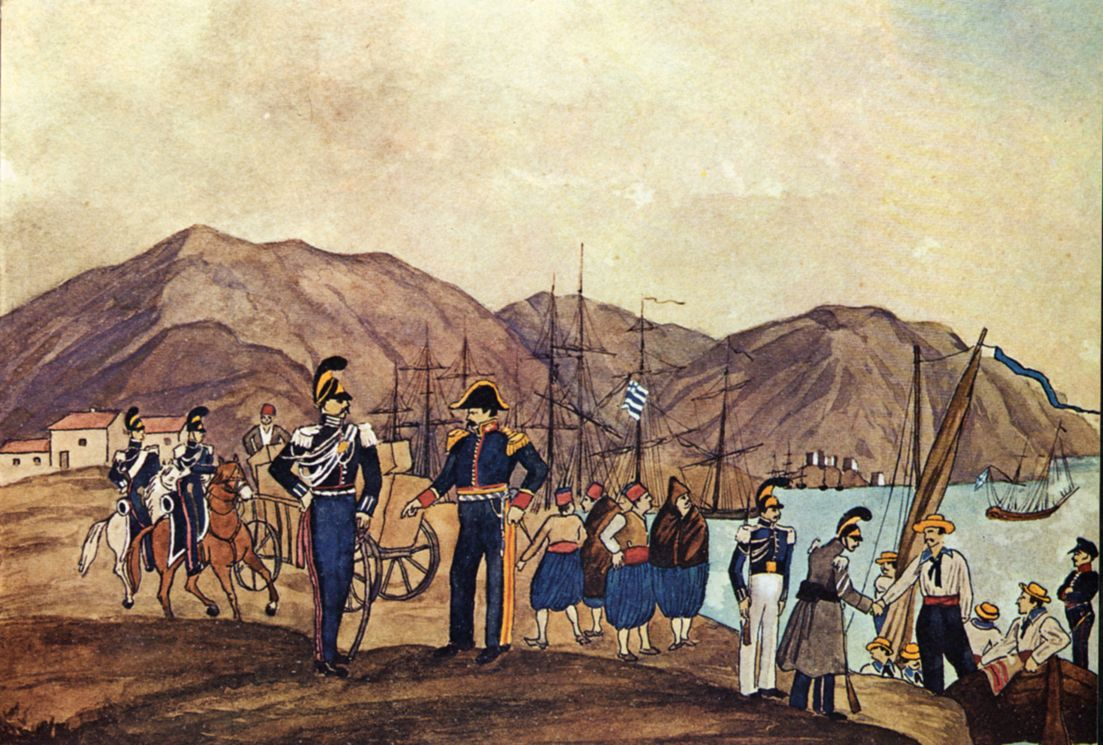
Men of the Royal Gendarmerie Corps which was established after the enthronement of Otto in 1833

A modern city plan was laid out, and public buildings erected. The finest legacy of this period are the buildings of the University of Athens (1837, under the name Othonian University), the Athens Polytechnic University (1837, under the name Royal School of Arts), the National Gardens of Athens (1840), the National Library of Greece (1842), the Old Royal Palace (now the Greek Parliament Building, 1843), the National Observatory of Athens (1846) and the Old Parliament Building (1858). Schools and hospitals were established all over the (still small) Greek dominion. Due to the negative feelings of the Greek people toward non-Greek rule, historical attention to this aspect of his reign has been neglected.

During 1836–37, Otto visited Germany, marrying the 17-year-old Duchess Amalia (Amelie) of Oldenburg (21 December 1818 to 20 May 1875). The wedding took place not in Greece but in Oldenburg, on 22 November 1836; the marriage did not produce an heir, and the new queen made herself unpopular by interfering in the government and maintaining her Lutheran faith. Otto was unfaithful to his wife, and had an affair with Jane Digby, a notorious woman his father had previously taken as a lover.

Due to his having overtly undermined the king, Armansperg was dismissed from his duties by King Otto immediately upon his return from Germany. However, despite high hopes on the part of the Greeks, the Bavarian Rudhart was appointed chief minister, and the granting of a constitution was again postponed. Otto's attempts to conciliate Greek sentiment through efforts to enlarge the frontiers of his kingdom, for example by the suggested acquisition of Crete in 1841, failed in their objective and only succeeded in embroiling him in conflict with the Great Powers.

== Parties, finances and the church ==
Personal coat of arms of Otto

Throughout his reign, King Otto found himself confronted by a recurring series of problems: partisanship of the Greeks, financial uncertainty, and ecclesiastical disputes.

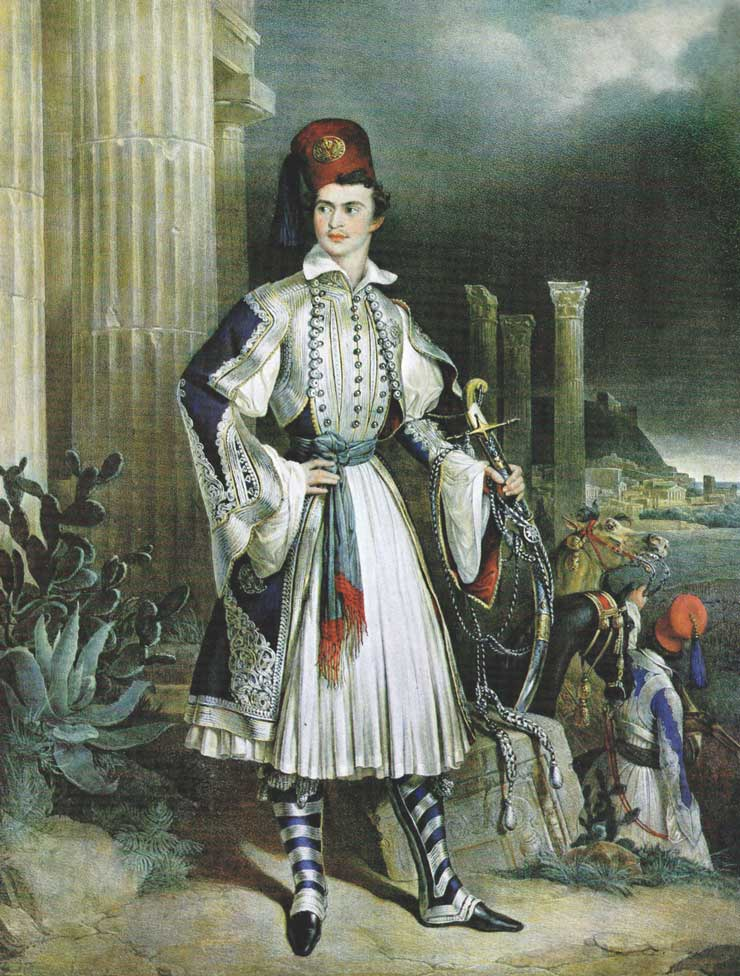
A romantic portrayal of Otto in Evzonas uniform, in front of ancient Greek ruins, by Gottlieb Bodmer

According to Richard Clogg, the financial uncertainty of the Othonian monarchy was the result of

1. Greece's poverty;
2. the concentration of land in the hands of a small number of wealthy "primates" like the Mavromichalis family of Mani; and,
3. the promise of 60,000,000 francs in loans from the Great Powers, which kept these nations involved in Greek internal affairs and the Crown constantly seeking to please one or the other power to ensure the flow of funds.

The political machinations of the Great Powers were personified in their three legates in Athens: Theobald Piscatory (France), Gabriel Catacazy (Russian Empire), and Sir Edmund Lyons (United Kingdom). They informed their home governments on the activities of the Greeks, while serving as advisers to their respective allied parties within Greece.

King Otto pursued policies such as balancing power among all the parties and sharing offices among the parties, ostensibly to reduce the power of the parties while trying to bring a pro-Othon party into being. The parties, however, became the entree into government power and financial stability.

The effect of his (and his advisors') policies was to make the Great Powers' parties more powerful, not less. The Great Powers did not support curtailing Otto's increasing absolutism, however, which resulted in a near permanent conflict between Otto's absolute monarchy and the power bases of his Greek subjects.

Otto found himself confronted by a number of intractable ecclesiastical issues: 1) monasticism, 2) Autocephaly, 3) the king as head of the Church and 4) toleration of other churches. His regents, Armansperg and Rundhart, established a controversial policy of suppressing the monasteries. This was very upsetting to the Church hierarchy. Russia considered itself a stalwart defender of Orthodoxy, but Orthodox believers were found in all three parties. Once he rid himself of his Bavarian advisers, Otto allowed the statutory dissolution of the monasteries to lapse.

By tradition dating back to the Byzantine era, the king was regarded by the Church as its head. On the issue of the Church's Autocephaly and his role as king within the Church, Otto was overwhelmed by the arcana of Orthodox Church doctrine and popular discontent with his Catholicism (while the Queen was Protestant).

In 1833, the regents had unilaterally declared the Autocephaly of the Church of Greece. This was a recognition of the de facto political situation, as the Patriarch of Constantinople was partially under the political control of the Ottoman Empire. However, faithful people, concerned that having a Catholic as the head of the Church of Greece would weaken the Orthodox Church, criticised the unilateral declaration of Autocephaly as non-canonical. For the same reason, they likewise resisted the foreign, mostly Protestant missionaries who established schools throughout Greece.

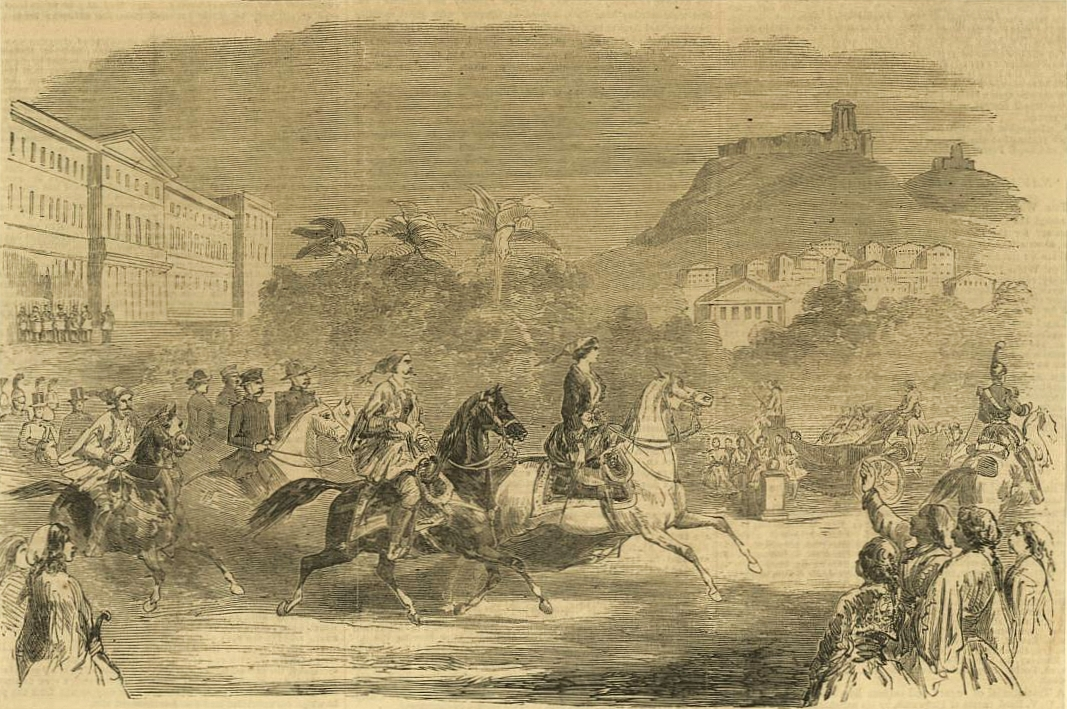
Otto with Amalia on a ride through Athens

Tolerance of other religions was over-supported by some in the English Party and others educated in the West as a symbol of Greece's progress as a liberal European state. In the end, power over the Church and education was ceded to the Russian Party, while the king maintained a veto over the decision of the Synod of Bishops. This was to keep balance and avoid discrediting Greece in the eyes of Western Europe as a backward, religiously intolerant society.

Catholic communities had been established in Greece since the 13th century (Athens, Cyclades, Chios, Crete). Jewish communities also existed in the country, those arriving after the Expulsion of the Jews from Spain (1492) joining the earlier Romaniotes, Jews who had been living there since the times of Apostle Paul. Muslim families were still living in Greece during Otto's reign, since hostility was mainly against the Ottoman state and its repressive mechanisms and not against Muslim people.

== 3 September 1843 Revolution ==
Although King Otto tried to function as an absolute monarch, as Thomas Gallant writes, he "was neither ruthless enough to be feared, nor compassionate enough to be loved, nor competent enough to be respected."

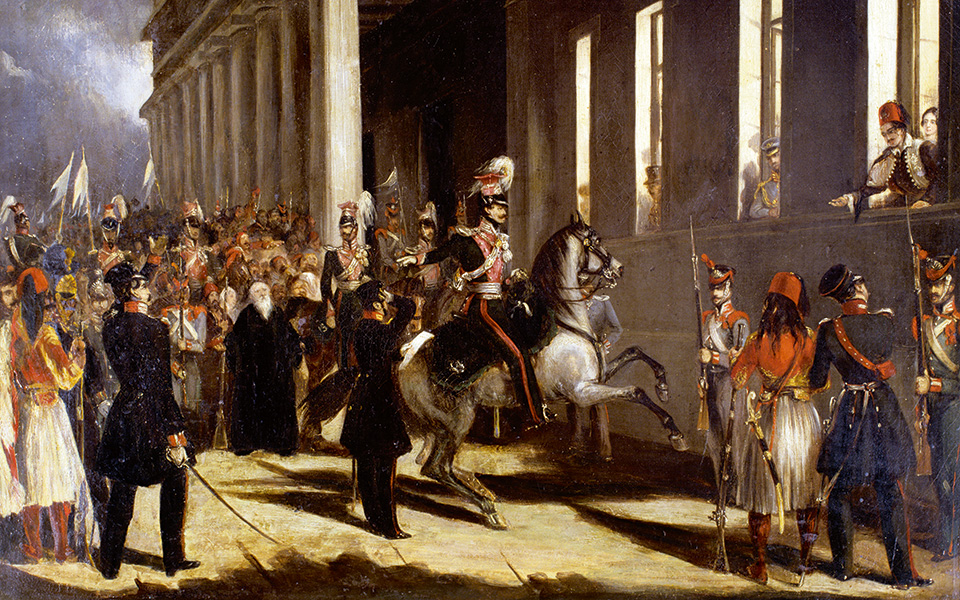
A painting representing the 3 September 1843 Revolution

By 1843, public dissatisfaction with him had reached crisis proportions and there were demands for a Constitution. Initially Otto refused to grant a Constitution, but as soon as Bavarian troops were withdrawn from the kingdom, a popular revolt was launched.

On 3 September 1843, the infantry, led by both Colonel Dimitris Kallergis and the respected Revolutionary captain and former President of the Athens City Council, General Yiannis Makriyiannis, assembled in Palace Square in front of the Palace in Athens. Eventually joined by much of the population of the small capital, the crowd refused to disperse until the king agreed to grant a constitution, which would require that there be Greeks in the Council, that he convene a permanent National Assembly and that Otto personally thank the leaders of the uprising.

Left with little recourse now that his German troops were gone, King Otto gave in to the pressure and agreed to the demands of the crowd over the objections of his opinionated queen. This square was renamed Constitution Square (Greek: Πλατεία Συντάγματος) to commemorate (through to the present) the events of September 1843—and was to feature in many later tumultuous events of Greek history. Now for the first time, the king had Greeks in his Council and the French Party, the English Party and the Russian Party (according to which of the Great Powers' culture they most esteemed) vied for rank and power.

The king's prestige, which was based in large part on his support by the combined Great Powers, but mostly the support of the British, suffered in the Pacifico incident of 1850, when Lord Palmerston, the British Foreign Secretary, sent the British fleet to blockade the port of Piraeus with warships to exact reparation for injustice done to a British subject.

== Crimean War ==
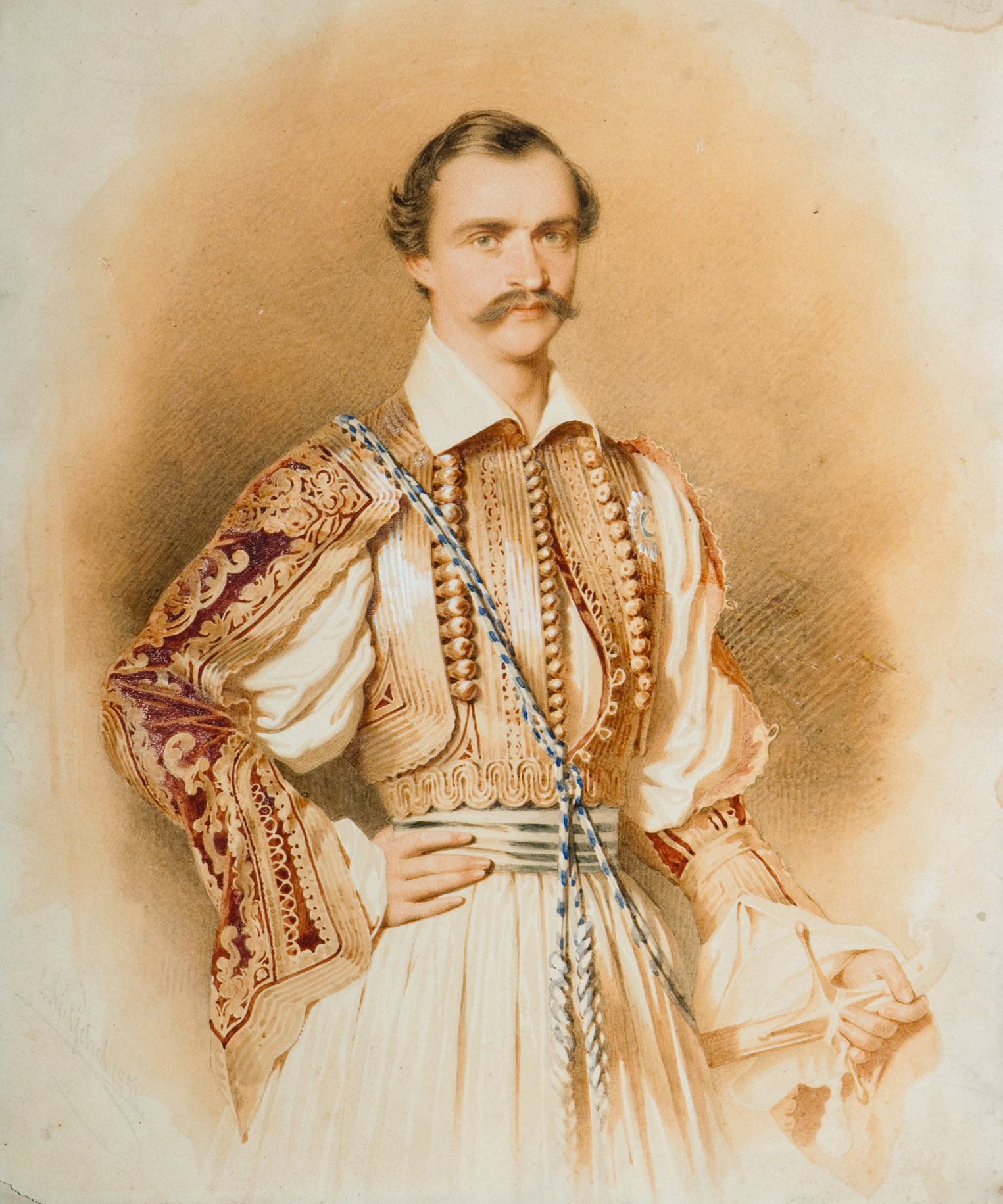
Otto in traditional Greek clothing.

The Great Idea (Μεγάλη Ιδέα), the irredentist concept that expressed the goal of reviving the Byzantine Empire, led him to contemplate entering the Crimean War on the side of Russia against Turkey and its British and French allies in 1853; the enterprise was unsuccessful and resulted in renewed intervention by the two Great Powers and a second blockade of the Piraeus port, forcing Greece to neutrality.

The continued inability of the royal couple to have children also raised the thorny issue of succession: the 1844 constitution insisted that Otto's successor had to be Orthodox, but as the king was childless, the only possible heirs were his younger brothers, Luitpold and Adalbert. The staunch Catholicism of the Wittelsbachs complicated matters, as Luitpold refused to convert and Adalbert married Infanta Amalia of Spain. The sons of Adalbert, and especially the eldest, Ludwig Ferdinand, were now considered the most likely candidates, but due to the issue of religion, no definite arrangements were ever made.

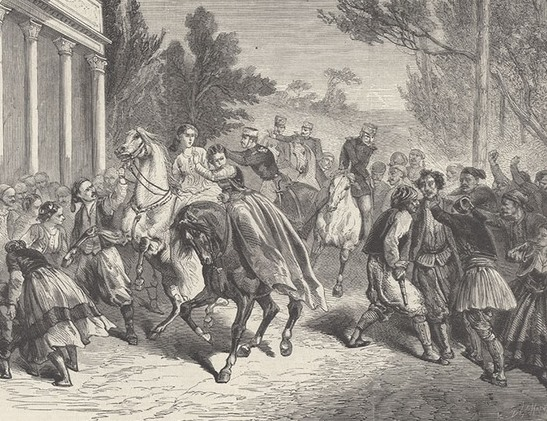
Failed assassination attempt on queen Amalia of Greece

In 1861, a student named Aristeidis Dosios (son of politician Konstantinos Dosios) attempted to murder Queen Amalia and was openly hailed as a hero. His attempt, however, also prompted spontaneous feelings of monarchism and sympathy towards the royal couple among the Greek population.

== Exile and death ==
While Otto was visiting the Peloponnese in 1862 a new coup was launched and this time a Provisional Government was set up and summoned a National Convention. Ambassadors of the Great Powers urged King Otto not to resist, and the king and queen took refuge on a British warship and returned to Bavaria aboard (the same way they had come to Greece), taking with them the Greek regalia which they had brought from Bavaria in 1832. In 1863 the Greek National Assembly elected Prince William of Denmark, aged only 17, King of the Hellenes under the regnal name of George I.

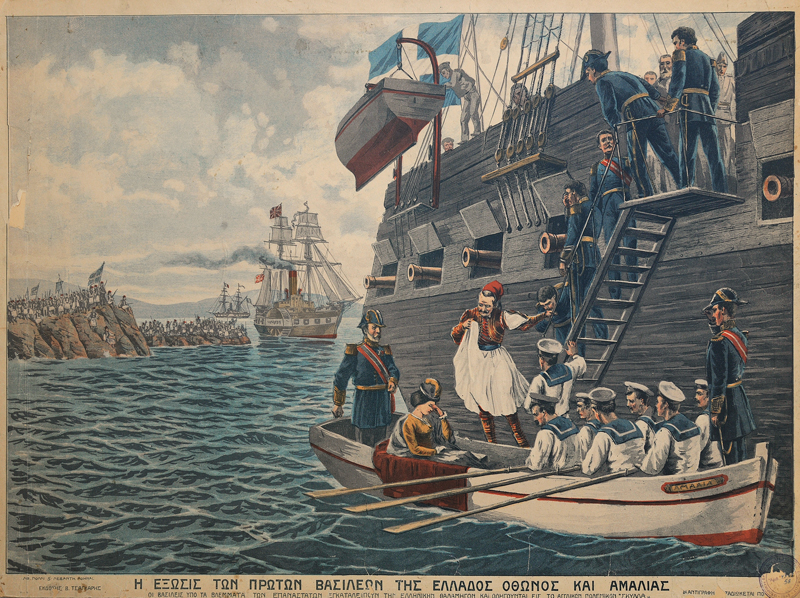
The expulsion of Otto in 1862 as portrayed in a popular colour lithograph

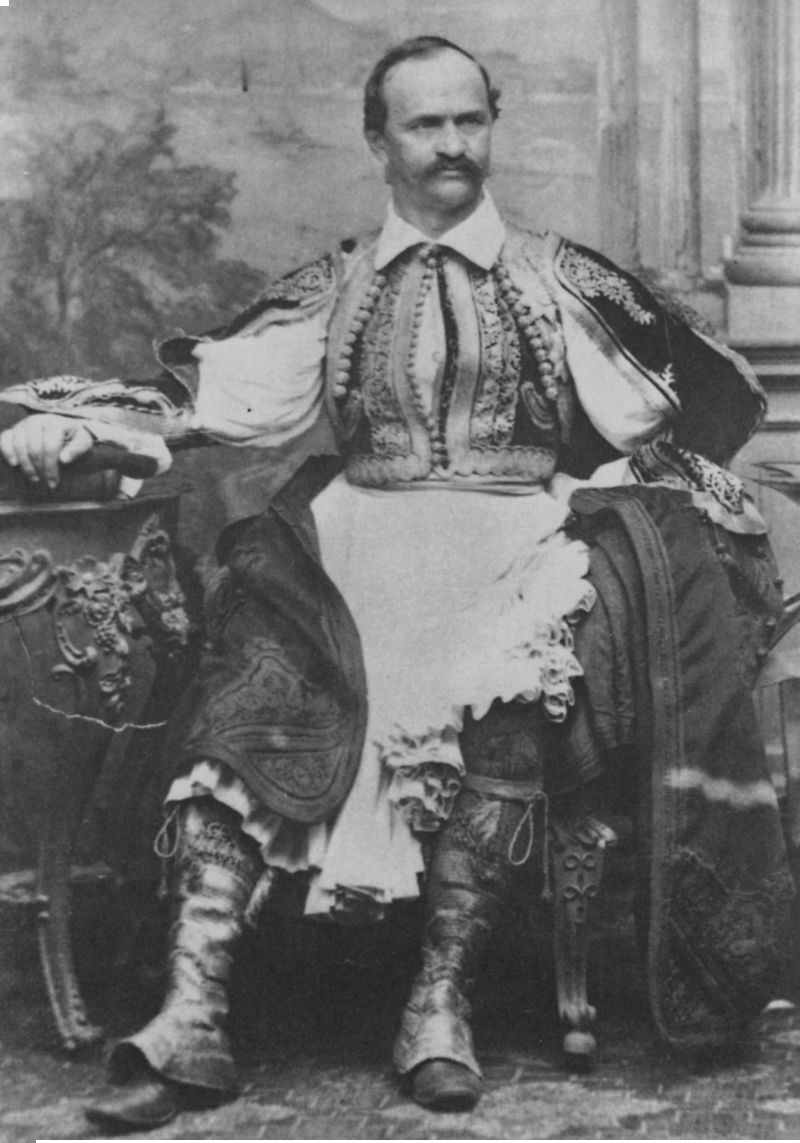
Otto in Bavaria, 1865

It has been suggested that had Otto and Amalia borne an heir, the king would not have been overthrown, as succession was also a major unresolved question at the time. However, the Constitution of 1844 made provision for his succession by his two younger brothers and their descendants.

Otto died in the palace of the former bishops of Bamberg, Germany, and was buried in the Theatiner Church in Munich. During his retirement, he would still wear the Greek traditional uniform, nowadays worn only by the evzones (Presidential Guards). Αccording to witnesses, Otto's last words were "Greece, my Greece, my beloved Greece."

== Archives ==
Otto's letters to his sister, Princess Mathilde Caroline of Bavaria, Grand Duchess of Hesse, written between 1832 and 1861, are preserved in the Hessian State Archive (Hessisches Staatsarchiv Darmstadt) in Darmstadt, Germany.

Otto's letters to his father-in-law, Augustus, Grand Duke of Oldenburg, written between 1836 and 1853, are preserved in the Niedersächsisches Landesarchiv in Oldenburg, Germany.

== Honours ==
He received the following honours:

- Kingdom of Bavaria: Knight of the Order of St. Hubert
- Kingdom of France: Grand Cross of the Legion of Honour, July 1834
- Spain: Knight of the Order of the Golden Fleece, 13 June 1835
- Russian Empire: Knight of the Order of St. Andrew, June 1835
- Sweden-Norway: Knight of the Royal Order of the Seraphim, 11 July 1835
- Kingdom of Prussia: Knight of the Order of the Black Eagle, 30 November 1835
- (Saxe-Coburg and Gotha) (Duchy of Saxe-Altenburg) (Saxe-Meiningen) Ernestine duchies: Grand Cross of the Saxe-Ernestine House Order, May 1836
- Grand Duchy of Hesse: Grand Cross of the Ludwig Order, 16 June 1836
- Austrian Empire:
  - Grand Cross of the Order of St. Stephen, 1837
  - Knight of the Order of the Golden Fleece, 1850
- Oldenburg: Grand Cross with Golden Crown of the House and Merit Order of Peter Frederick Louis, 28 October 1839
- Belgium: Grand Cordon of the Order of Leopold, 14 May 1841
- Kingdom of Saxony: Knight of the Order of the Rue Crown, 1841
- Kingdom of Sardinia: Knight of the Order of the Annunciation, 31 January 1845
- Denmark: Knight of the Order of the Elephant, 2 November 1846
- Kingdom of Hanover:
  - Knight of the Order of St. George, 1846
  - Grand Cross of the Royal Guelphic Order
- Saxe-Weimar-Eisenach: Grand Cross of the Order of the White Falcon, 17 August 1852
- Duchy of Modena and Reggio: Grand Cross of the Order of the Eagle of Este, 1856
- Württemberg: Grand Cross of the Order of the Württemberg Crown, 1856
- Two Sicilies: Grand Cross of the Order of St. Ferdinand and Merit

== Ancestry ==
Ancestors of Otto of Greece

8. Frederick Michael, Count Palatine of Zweibrücken
4. Maximilian I Joseph of Bavaria
9. Countess Palatine Maria Franziska of Sulzbach
2. Ludwig I of Bavaria
10. Prince George William of Hesse-Darmstadt
5. Princess Augusta Wilhelmine of Hesse-Darmstadt
11. Countess Maria Louise Albertine of Leiningen-Dagsburg-Falkenburg
1. Otto I of Greece
12. Ernest Frederick III, Duke of Saxe-Hildburghausen
6. Frederick, Duke of Saxe-Altenburg
13. Princess Ernestine of Saxe-Weimar-Eisenach
3. Princess Therese of Saxe-Hildburghausen
14. Charles II, Grand Duke of Mecklenburg-Strelitz
7. Duchess Charlotte Georgine of Mecklenburg-Strelitz
15. Princess Friederike of Hesse-Darmstadt

== See also ==
- Greek crown jewels

== Bibliography ==
- Bower, Leonard, and Gordon Bolitho. Otho I, King of Greece: A Biography. London: Selwyn & Blount, 1939
- Dümler, Christian, and Kathrin Jung. Von Athen nach Bamberg: König Otto von Griechenland, Begleitheft zur Ausstellung in der Neuen Residenz Bamberg, 21. Juni bis 3. November 2002. München: Bayerische Schlösserverwaltung, 2002. ISBN 3-932982-45-2.
- Hyland, M. Amalie, 1818–1875: Herzogin von Oldenburg, Königin von Griechenland. Oldenburg: Isensee, 2004. ISBN 978-3-89995-122-6.
- Jelavich, Barbara (1961). "Russia, Bavaria and the Greek Revolution of 1862/1863". Balkan Studies. 2 (1): 125–150. ISSN 2241-1674.
- Murken, Jan, and Saskia Durian-Ress. König-Otto-von-Griechenland-Museum der Gemeinde Ottobrunn. Bayerische Museen, Band 22. München: Weltkunst, 1995. ISBN 3-921669-16-2.
- Petropoulos, Ioannis & Koumarianou, Aikaterini (1977). "Περίοδος Βασιλείας του Όθωνος 1833–1862. Εισαγωγή & Περίοδος Απόλυτης Μοναρχίας" [Reign of Otto 1833–1862. Introduction & Absolute Monarchy Period]. In Christopoulos, Georgios A. & Bastias, Ioannis K. (eds.). Ιστορία του Ελληνικού Έθνους [History of the Greek Nation] (in Greek). Vol. ΙΓ: Νεώτερος Ελληνισμός από το 1833 έως το 1881 [Modern Hellenism from 1833 to 1881]. Athens: Ekdotiki Athinon. pp. 8–105. ISBN 978-960-213-109-1.
- Seidl, Wolf (1981). Bayern in Griechenland. Die Geburt des griechischen Nationalstaats und die Regierung König Ottos [Bavaria in Greece. The Birth of the Greek Nation-State and the Reign of King Otto] (in German) (New and expanded ed.). Munich: Prestel. ISBN 3-7913-0556-5.

Otto of Greece House of Wittelsbach Born: 1 June 1815 Died: 26 July 1867
Regnal titles
New title	King of Greece; 1832–1862	Succeeded by George I as King of the Hellenes
Titles in pretence
Loss of title	— TITULAR — King of Greece; 1862–1867	Succeeded by Luitpold
