= Gottlieb Bodmer =

German painter, designer, and lithographer

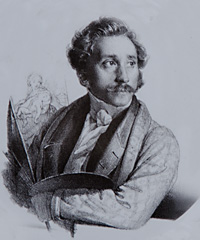
Gottlieb Bodmer by an unknown artist

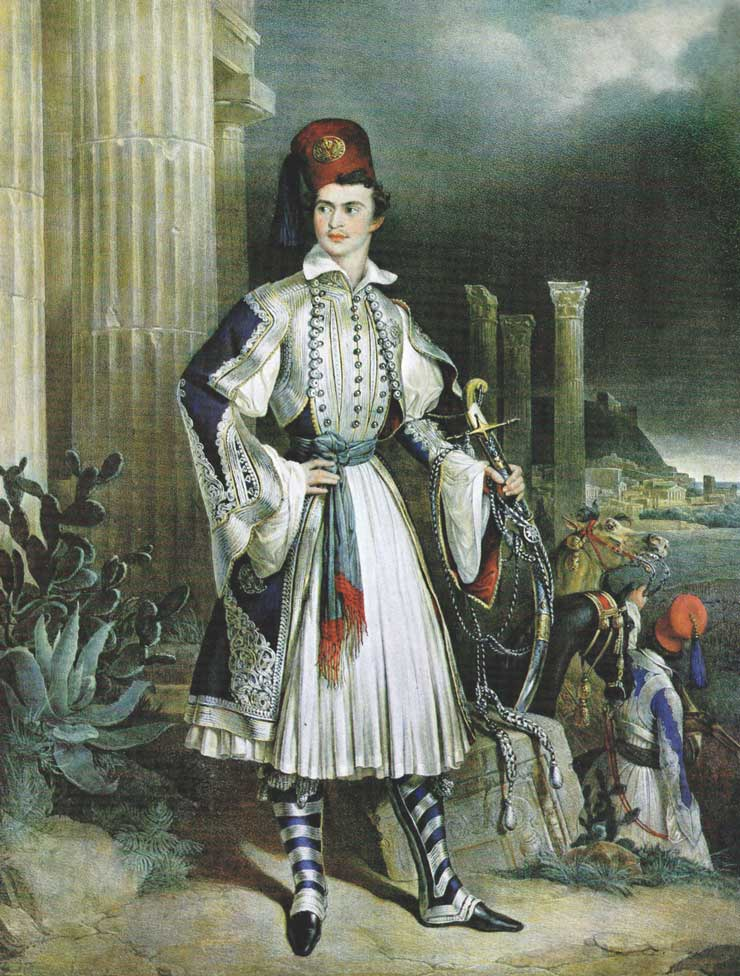
Otto of Greece

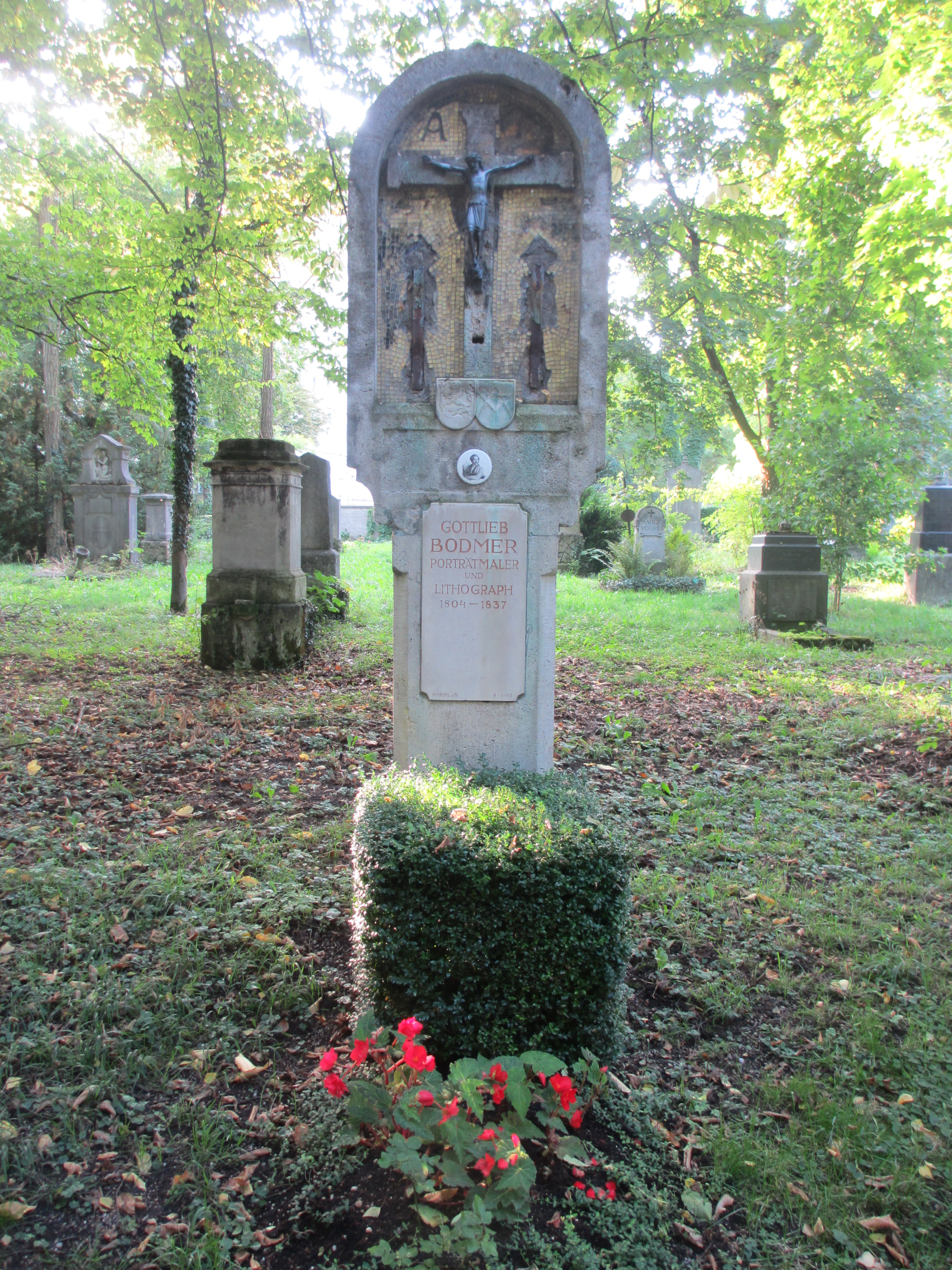
Grave of Gottlieb Bodmer at Alter Südlicher Friedhof in Munich

Gottlieb Bodmer (1804–1837) was a German painter, designer, and lithographer.

== Life ==
Bodmer was born at Munich in 1804. He first painted portraits under Stieler. In 1829, he lithographed the Madonna di San Sisto, after the engraving of F. Müller, and later two paintings after H. Hess, viz., Christmas Eve, and a small altar-piece; he is favourably known by these works. He visited Paris, and returning to Munich, died in 1837.

== Works ==
His works include:

- The Departure of King Otto.
- King Ludwig I in his Family Circle.
- The Knight and his Love; after Foltz.
- The Swiss Grenadier; after Kirner.

== See also ==
- List of German painters
