= Ignaz von Rudhart =

Bavarian scholar and public servant

Ignaz von Rudhart Ιγνάτιος φον Ρούντχαρτ
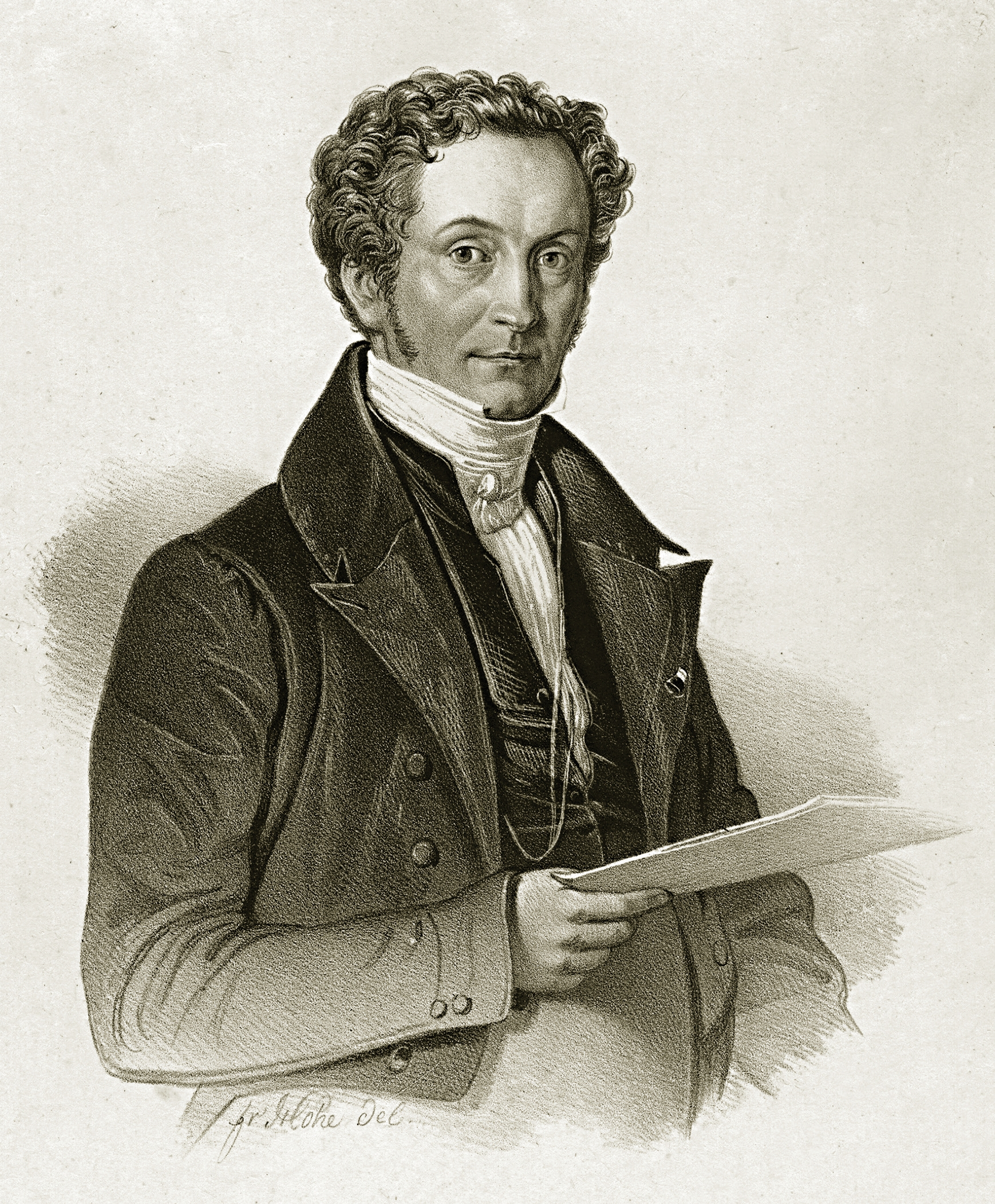
- Ignaz von Rudhart.

Prime Minister of Greece
- In office 2 February 1837 – 8 December 1837
- Monarch: Otto
- Preceded by: Josef Ludwig von Armansperg
- Succeeded by: Direct Rule by Otto

Personal details
- Born: 11 March 1790 Weismain, Prince-Bishopric of Bamberg
- Died: 11 May 1838 (aged 48) Trieste, Austrian Empire

Ignaz Ritter von Rudhart (Greek: Ιγνάτιος φον Ρούντχαρτ; 11 March 1790 – 11 May 1838) was a Bavarian scholar and public servant who was dispatched to Greece to serve as President of the Privy Council (Prime Minister) during the reign of King Otto.

Von Rudhart had received a doctorate of law from the Ludwig-Maximilians-Universität München, had authored two books, one of them a statistical survey of the Bavarian Kingdom, which he served as a member of the Council of State, prior to his appointment as Prime Minister of Greece.

When he arrived in Athens in February 1837, he was received suspiciously by the English legate Lyons (who had been a supporter of his predecessor, von Armansperg) and immediately found himself at odds with the king over the role of the prime minister. King Otto was committed to an absolute monarchy and was resistant to a powerful chief minister. Von Rudhart had a series of clashes with king, and being disliked by Queen Amalia, his resignation was accepted by King Otto 10 months after he arrived in Greece. Otto served as his own President of the Privy Council until a constitution was forced on him during the 3 September 1843 Revolution.

Political offices
Preceded by Josef Ludwig von Armansperg	Prime Minister of Greece; 2 February - 8 December 1837	Succeeded by Otto of Greece
