= Nicholas Macdonald Sarsfield Cod'd =

Nicholas Macdonald Sarsfield Cod'd (c. 1778 – ?) was an Irish pretender who claimed genealogical connections to medieval Irish royalty and to the Palaiologos dynasty, the last ruling dynasty of the Byzantine Empire. Through his invented Palaiologos descent, Sarsfield in 1830 attempted to push his claim on the throne of the recently established Kingdom of Greece. Though he wrote to prominent nobles in the United Kingdom, including King William IV, and might have contacted other monarchs, he did not manage to rally any support.

== Biography ==
Nicholas Macdonald Sarsfield Cod'd was born in Ireland c. 1778. (Note: One document describes Sarsfield as being 38 years old in 1816.) At some point prior to 1820, Sarsfield apparently lived in France. Per an 1816 description, Sarsfield had "chestnut hair and eyebrows, a middling forehead, blue eyes, regular nose, middling mouth, chestnut beard, round chin, oval visage, high complexion". On 18 May 1823, Sarsfield wrote to the British Home Office to request the return of "certain titles and dominions in Ireland" to him by the right of his lineage. The letter had no effect.

In 1830, while living on Duke Street in Wexford, Sarsfield petitioned Lords Aberdeen and Palmerston to press his "ancestral" claim to the recently established Kingdom of Greece, which had been offered to the young prince Leopold of Saxe-Coburg and Gotha. In his letter, Sarsfield referred to himself as "the Comte de Sarsfield of the Order of Lidelity, Heir and Representative to his Royal Ancestors Constantines the last Reigning Emperors of Greece subdued in Constantinople by the Turks" and he included a large genealogical tree which traced his descent both from the Palaiologos dynasty (the last reigning dynasty of the Byzantine Empire) and from the medieval Irish king Diarmaid mac Murchadha. The claimed Palaiologos descent was through the female line, though Sarsfield considered himself the legitimate senior heir.

Sarsfield's attempt to claim the Greek throne is noteworthy since multiple European nobles who were offered the throne, including Leopold of Saxe-Coburg and Gotha (who later instead became the king of Belgium as Leopold I), declined the Greek throne due to the dangers posed of becoming the sovereign of such a new and potentially turbulent country, exhausted after ten years of fighting for independence from the Ottoman Empire. Sarsfield sent his letter to Lord Aberdeen on 29 May, and his letter to Lord Palmerston on 24 December. Both letters included slightly random capitalisation and very sparse punctuation. In his letters, he wrote that he hoped the lords would forward his letter to the Greek government for the consideration of the Greek people. His letter to Lord Palmerston also included a collection of testimonials and recommendations by people he knew, including several priests.

Annoyed that the lords did not acknowledge his petition, Sarsfield wrote to the king, William IV, but received no response, and also proposed to write to Charles X of France, Nicholas I of Russia, Frederick William III of Prussia and Pope Pius VIII, though it is unknown if any letters were ever sent to them. In his letter to William IV, Sarsfield wrote that the monarchies of Europe had acted improperly in attempting to force a usurper (Leopold of Saxe-Coburg and Gotha) on the Greek people, "to the exclusion of the petitioner", but that Leopold had acted appropriately in resigning the throne. Sarsfield was not destined to become "Nicholas I of Greece"; no reply was ever sent by William IV, nor by any other potential monarch contacted.

Sarsfield's petitions to Lords Aberdeen and Palmerston were rediscovered in 1931 and published by the historian Arthur Charles Frederick Beales, who thought it tragic that Sarsfield would now again be regarded in the same way he was probably regarded by his contemporaries, "a huge joke".
